= List of Australia Schoolboy rugby league team players =

This article lists all the rugby league footballers who have been selected for the Australian Schoolboys, since its inception in 1972. Each year the best high school players in Australia are chosen to either represent the Schoolboys on an overseas tour or host a touring country in Australia. In 1978, 1983 and 1987, merit teams were selected who did not play anybody. The players selected in those years are still considered Australian Schoolboys. The 1990 side was originally a merit team, but they later played a one-off match.

Players are listed in alphabetical order by the year they were first selected.

== List of players ==
Name	School	Year(s)
Royce Ayliffe	Keira High, Wollongong	1972
Chris Barugh	Balcatta High, Perth	1972
Trevor Binskin	Gosford High	1972
Les Boyd	Nyngan High	1972
Ian Bridge	Wyong High	1972
John Cook	Maitland Boys High	1972
Warwick Dean	Cowra High	1972
Robert Finch	Maitland Boys High	1972
Stephen Fishenden	Tamworth High	1972
Anthony Graham	Cronulla High	1972
Brian Hetherington	Figtree High	1972
Gary Hollis	Tamworth High	1972
Jack Jeffries	Keira High, Wollongong	1972
Rodney Jones	Kogarah High	1972
Dennis Kelly	Daramalan High	1972
Michael Lott	Gundagai High	1972
Barrie Maher	Henry Kendall High	1972
Malcolm Mercer	Gunnedah High	1972
David Mooney	Condell Park High	1972
Rod Patison	Bulli High	1972
Peter Priddle	Bomaderry High	1972
Graeme Prior	Berkeley High	1972
Herb Rauter	Queanbeyan High	1972
Keith Rugg	Dapto High	1972
Ian Schubert	Wauchope High	1972
David Tassell	Kempsey High	1972
Barry Taylor	Bass High	1972
Warwick Tidbury	Cessnock High	1972
Michael Turner	Condobolin High	1972
Geoff Williams	Condobolin High	1972
Craig Young	Corrimal High	1972
Brian Battese	Richmond River High NSWCHS	1978
Craig Beadows	Southport State High QSSRL	1978
Steven Beresford	Glen Innes High NSWCHS	1978
Mark Cannon	Ballina High NSWCHS	1978, 1979
Robert Clarke	Coffs Harbour High NSWCHS	1978
Malcolm Cochrane	Taree High NSWCHS	1978, 1979
Rod Edmonds	Endeavour Sports High NSWCHS	1978
Mark Glass	Kirrawee High NSWCHS	1978
Stephen Hardy	Kirrawee High NSWCHS	1978, 1979
Dean Herbert	Forbes High NSWCHS	1978
Neil Hunt	Pendle Hill High NSWCHS	1978, 1979
Craig McAlpine	Aspley State High QSSRL	1978, 1979
Mark Ross	Evans High NSWCHS	1978, 1979
Tony Ryan	Warwick State High QSSRL	1978
Jim See	Dubbo South High NSWCHS	1978
Robert Simpkins	Glen Innes High NSWCHS	1978
John Tapp	The Gap State High QSSRL	1978
Ian Barkley	Merewether High NSWCHS	1979
David Brooks	Tamworth High NSWCHS	1979
Jeff Case	Kooringal High NSWCHS	1979
Ken Clarke	Wellington High NSWCHS	1979
Scott Czislowski	Harristown State High QSSRL	1979
John Daly	Aquinas College Southport QSSRL	1979
Ben Elias	Holy Cross College, Ryde NSWCCC	1979, 1981
Andrew Farrar	Cowra High NSWCHS	1979
Brod Guymer	Harristown State High QSSRL	1979
Bill Kain	St Benedict's College, Auburn NSWCCC	1979
Peter Lamb	Kedron State High QSSRL	1979
Brett Le Man	Coorparoo State High QSSRL	1979
Glen Mortimer	Erina High NSWCHS	1979
Stephen Mullen	Taree High NSWCHS	1979
Billy Noke	Dubbo South High NSWCHS	1979
Gavin Payne	Townsville State High QSSRL	1979
Tony Rampling	Kempsey High NSWCHS	1979
Anthony Gray	Blackall Magpies QSSRL	1979
Terry Ryan	Marist College, Kogarah NSWCCC	1979
Martin Silarski	Warilla High NSWCHS	1979
John Sparks	Edmund Rice College, Wollongong NSWCCC	1979
James Bell	Yanco Agricultural High NSWCHS	1981
Phil Blake	Christian Brothers College, Manly NSWCCC	1981
Greg Carson	Mt. Gravatt State High QSSRL	1981
Steve Carter	Toowoomba State High QSSRL	1981, 1982
Steven Collins	Quirindi High NSWCHS	1981
Paul Diaz	St Mary's Cathedral High NSWCCC	1981
Mark Ellison	Marist College, Pagewood NSWCCC	1981
Gary French	Beaudesert State High QSSRL	1981
Brett Gale	Holy Cross College, Ryde NSWCCC	1981
Neil Herbert	Forbes High NSWCHS	1981
Mark Hohn	Pittsworth State High QSSRL	1981
Maurice Hulbert	Narrabri High NSWCHS	1981
Mark McDonald	Camp Hill State High QSSRL	1981
Wayne Morrow	Pendle Hill High NSWCHS	1981
Curtis Powell	Clontarf Beach State High QSSRL	1981
Derek Schaeffer	Yanco Agricultural High NSWCHS	1981
Ricky Walford	Walgett High NSWCHS	1981
Lance Wise	Dapto High NSWCHS	1981
Peter Cole	Benilde High NSWCCC	1982
Jeff Coutts	Pittsworth State High QSSRL	1982
Bronko Djura	Benilde High NSWCCC	1982
Robert Dunning	John Paul II College, Marayong NSWCCC	1982
Andrew Ettingshausen	De La Salle College, Cronulla NSWCCC	1982, 1983
Scott Gale	Holy Cross College, Ryde NSWCCC	1982
David Greene	St Gregory's College, Campbelltown NSWCCC	1982
Wayne Harvey	Lake Illawarra High NSWCHS	1982
Paul Langmack	Patrician Brothers, Fairfield NSWCCC	1982
Max Mannix	Patrician Brothers, Fairfield NSWCCC	1982
Trevor McCaffery	Parramatta Marist High NSWCCC	1982
John McNamara	St Augustine's College, Brookvale NSWCCC	1982
Keith Meskell	Coffs Harbour High NSWCHS	1982
Tommy Nicholls	Patrician Brothers, Fairfield NSWCCC	1982
Barry Reidy	Patrician Brothers, Fairfield NSWCCC	1982, 1983
Grant Rix	Warwick State High QSSRL	1982, 1983
Stephen Robinson	Kingswood High NSWCHS	1982, 1983
Mark Wheeler	Miami State High QSSRL	1982
Michael Woods	Holroyd High NSWCHS	1982
Jason Alchin	Cardiff High NSWCHS	1983, 1984
Greg Alexander	Patrician Brothers, Fairfield NSWCCC	1983
Luke Beasley	Woodlawn College, Lismore NSWCCC	1983
Max Beecher	Ryde High NSWCHS	1983
David Burns	Engadine High NSWCHS	1983
Tony Butterfield	Colyton High NSWCHS	1983
Adam Chapman	Clontarf Beach State High QSSRL	1983
Matthew Corkery	Copland College ACT	1983
Jeff Hardy	James Cook Boys High NSWCHS	1983
Ian Naden	Dubbo High NSWCHS	1983
Paul Shaw	Wellington High NSWCHS	1983
Paul Sironen	Holy Cross College, Ryde NSWCCC	1983
John Willcocks	Plumpton High NSWCHS	1983, 1984
Theo Anast	Armidale High NSWCHS	1984
David Boyd	Chatham High NSWCHS	1984
Sandy Campbell	Toowoomba State High QSSRL	1984
Danny Crnkovich	Granville Boys High School NSWCHS	1984, 1985
Jim Donnelly	Christian Brothers, Toowoomba QSSRL	1984
Greg Gibson	Northmead High NSWCHS	1984
Marc Glanville	Marist Brothers, Wagga Wagga NSWCCC	1984
Brendan Hall	Dickson College ACT	1984
Richard Harmon	Whitebridge High NSWCHS	1984
Ray Herring	Oakey State High QSSRL	1984
Greg Manthey	Christian Brothers, Toowoomba QSSRL	1984
Paul Martin	Stirling College ACT	1984, 1985
Paul Osborne	Christian Brothers, Lewisham NSWCCC	1984
Darren Riley	Balmain High NSWCHS	1984
David Ronson	The Forest High NSWCHS	1984
Graham Beale	Copland College ACT	1985
Paul Beath	Cootamundra High NSWCHS	1985
Jim Bell	Ashcroft High NSWCHS	1985
Tony Cosatto	Ashcroft High NSWCHS	1985
Terry Dardengo	Trinity Catholic College, Lismore NSWCCC	1985
Terry Dolling	Glendale Technology High NSWCHS	1985, 1986
Bill Dunn	Tweed River High NSWCHS	1985
Mounir Elsamad	Granville Boys High School NSWCHS	1985
Warwick Giddey	Keira High, Wollongong NSWCHS	1985
Darren Girard	St Gregory's College, Campbelltown NSWCCC	1985
Rhoderick Holmes	Pittsworth State High QSSRL	1985
Gordon Langton	Murgon State High QSSRL	1985
Darren McGrath	Oakey State High QSSRL	1985
Gary Roper	Dickson College ACT	1985
David Rowles	Ashcroft High NSWCHS	1985
Craig Sloane	St Gregory's College, Campbelltown NSWCCC	1985
Darren Stewart	Parramatta Marist High School NSWCCC	1985
Grant Butterfield	Colyton High NSWCHS	1986
John Cartwright	St Patrick's College, Gympie QSSRL	1986
Bradley Clyde	Hawker College ACT	1986, 1987
Michael Erickson	Taree High NSWCHS	1986
Andrew Gee	Beaudesert State High QSSRL	1986
Ben Gillies	Yanco Agricultural High NSWCHS	1986
Darryl Harrison	Murgon State High QSSRL	1986
Tony Hearn	Keebra Park State High QSSRL	1986, 1987
Damian Keniff	St Gregory's College, Campbelltown NSWCCC	1986
Glen Liddiard	Cambridge Park High NSWCHS	1986
Mark McPherson	Patrician Brothers, Fairfield NSWCCC	1986
Andy Patmore	East Hills Boys High NSWCHS	1986
Tim Perrin	St Gregory's College, Campbelltown NSWCCC	1986, 1987
Doug Pitt	Mackay North State High QSSRL	1986
Henry Raymond	St Augustine's College, Cairns QSSRL	1986
Roger Roberts	Ballina High NSWCHS	1986
Scott Rofe	Keebra Park State High QSSRL	1986
Steve Sheehy	McCarthy Senior High NSWCCC	1986
Mark Soden	Dubbo South High NSWCHS	1986
Craig Teevan	Oakey State High QSSRL	1986
Scott Wilson	South Sydney High NSWCHS	1986
Stephen Burns	John Paul II College, Marayong NSWCCC	1987, 1988
Allan Cann	Beenleigh State High QSSRL	1987
Steve Carter	Jamison High NSWCHS	1987
David Danes	Patrician Brothers, Fairfield NSWCCC	1987
Matthew Fuller	St Gregory's College, Campbelltown NSWCCC	1987, 1988
Jason Gregory	Hawker College ACT	1987
Scott Mahon	Pendle Hill High NSWCHS	1987
Shane Morrissey	Tweed River High NSWCHS	1987
Mark Mulligan	Grafton High NSWCHS	1987
Terry Pastormoglou	Canterbury Boys High NSWCHS	1987
Michael Pengally	Gladstone State High QSSRL	1987
Andrew Richards	St Mary's College, Toowoomba QSSRL	1987
Kyle White	Patrician Brothers, Fairfield NSWCCC	1987
Craig Wilson	De La Salle College, Cronulla NSWCCC	1987
Jason Bartlette	Keebra Park State High QSSRL	1988
Lewis Beale	Karabar High NSWCHS	1988
Tim Brasher	Grantham High NSWCHS	1988
Grant Cleal	Pine Rivers State High QSSRL	1988
Dan Collins	John Paul II College, Marayong NSWCCC	1988
Scott Duffy	Erina High NSWCHS	1988
David Fairleigh	Gosford High NSWCHS	1988
Brad Fittler	McCarthy Senior High NSWCCC	1988, 1989
Ian Herron	James Cook Boys High NSWCHS	1988
Brett Horsnell	Keebra Park State High QSSRL	1988
Greg Keenan	St Gregory's College, Campbelltown NSWCCC	1988
Kurt Landers	James Cook Boys High NSWCHS	1988
Jason Martin	Raymond Terrace High NSWCHS	1988
David Mullane	Toormina High NSWCHS	1988
Matthew Munro	St Gregory's College, Campbelltown NSWCCC	1988
David Percival	Canowindra High NSWCHS	1988
David Simpson	Caboolture State High QSSRL	1988
Ken Whitton	St Patrick's College, Sutherland NSWCCC	1988
Jamie Ainscough	Elderslie High NSWCHS	1989
Jason Croker	Batemans Bay High NSWCHS	1989
Jason Death	Lake Ginninderra College ACT	1989, 1990
Jason Ford	Brewarrina Central NSWCHS	1989
Duncan Gillies	Yass High ACT	1989, 1990
Shane Mackley	Warners Bay High NSWCHS	1989
Jamie Mathiou	Kingscliff High NSWCHS	1989
Julian O'Neill	St Brendan's College, Yeppoon QSSRL	1989
Jeff Orford	Marcellin College, Randwick NSWCCC	1989
Ryan Schofield	Holsworthy High NSWCHS	1989
Scott Sims	Tweed River High NSWCHS	1989
Jason Stewart	Holy Cross College, Ryde NSWCCC	1989
Stephen Storrie	Kotara High NSWCHS	1989
Jason Taylor	St Gregory's College, Campbelltown NSWCCC	1989
Jason Twist	Everton Park State High QSSRL	1989
Robert Walsh	Corrimal High NSWCHS	1989
Peter Denham	Bellingen High NSWCHS	1990
Jason Evans	Stirling College ACT	1990
Glenn Grief	Patrician Brothers, Fairfield NSWCCC	1990
Russell Hill	Forbes High NSWCHS	1990
Tim Horan	St Gregory's College, Campbelltown NSWCCC	1990, 1991
Rodney Howe	St Francis Xavier College, Newcastle NSWCCC	1990
Jason Martin	Temora High NSWCHS	1990
Paul Quinn	St Gregory's College, Campbelltown NSWCCC	1990
Abby Roberts	Trinity Catholic College, Lismore NSWCCC	1990
Dean Scott	Keebra Park State High QSSRL	1990
James Shepherd	Holy Cross College, Ryde NSWCCC	1990
James Smith	St John's College, Dubbo NSWCCC	1990
Josh Stuart	St Paul's High, Manly NSWCCC	1990, 1991
Paul Tilden	Mt. Austin High NSWCHS	1990
Shane Vincent	McCarthy Senior High NSWCCC	1990
Glen Air	Bulli High NSWCHS	1991
Roger Best	Bremer State High QSSRL	1991
Shane Buckman	Miller Technology High NSWCHS	1991
Michael Buettner	Westfields Sports High NSWCHS	1991
Damien Chapman	St Gregory's College, Campbelltown NSWCCC	1991
Stuart Collins	Jesmond High NSWCHS	1991
Sid Domic	North Rockhampton State High QSSRL	1991, 1992
Barry Elsegood	Pittwater High NSWCHS	1991
Scott England	Kiama High NSWCHS	1991
Brett Grogan	Cairns State High QSSRL	1991
Andrew Harding	Yanco Agricultural High NSWCHS	1991
Andrew McIlwaine	Patrician Brothers, Fairfield NSWCCC	1991
Matthew McKee	Catherine McCauley College NSWCCC	1991
Craig Makepeace	Woy Woy High NSWCHS	1991
Ken Nagas	Lake Ginninderra College ACT	1991
Clinton O'Brien	Frawley College, Redcliffe QSSRL	1991
Jamie Olejnik	Cambridge Park High NSWCHS	1991
Tim Patterson	Cardiff High NSWCHS	1991
Anthony Pauling	Whitebridge High NSWCHS	1991
Sean Ryan	St Patrick's College, Sutherland NSWCCC	1991
Chris Sheldrick	Yanco Agricultural High NSWCHS	1991
Craig Simon	Dapto High NSWCHS	1991
Craig Weston	Palm Beach Currumbin State High QSSRL	1991
Danny Williams	Umina High NSWCHS	1991
Nathan Barnes	Richmond High NSWCHS	1992
Robbie Beazley	Dubbo South High NSWCHS	1992
Michael Bird	Murgon State High QSSRL	1992
Damien Borrow	Rutherford High NSWCHS	1992
Todd Brown	Bremer State High QSSRL	1992
Garen Casey	Patrician Brothers, Fairfield NSWCCC	1992
John Driscoll	Emmaus College, Rockhampton QSSRL	1992
Peter Driscoll	St Gregory's College, Campbelltown NSWCCC	1992, 1993
Anthony Fowler	Palm Beach Currumbin State High QSSRL	1992
Michael Francis	St Gregory's College, Campbelltown NSWCCC	1992
Nick Graham	De La Salle College, Cronulla NSWCCC	1992
Shane Grainer	Mareeba State High QSSRL	1992
Paul Heffernan	Trinity Senior High, Wagga Wagga NSWCCC	1992
Andrew Hill	Patrician Brothers, Fairfield NSWCCC	1992
Jamie Kennedy	Daramalan College ACT	1992
Brent Lambert	Palm Beach Currumbin State High QSSRL	1992
Cameron Lewis	Farrer Agricultural High NSWCHS	1992
Robert Mears	St Gregory's College, Campbelltown NSWCCC	1992
Steven Menzies	Narrabeen High NSWCHS	1992
Mark Mom	St John's College, Woodlawn NSWCCC	1992
Robbie Ross	Swansea High NSWCHS	1992
Matt Seers	St Gregory's College, Campbelltown NSWCCC	1992
James Thibault	St Mary's College, Gunnedah NSWCCC	1992
Craig Carrington	Holy Cross College, Ryde NSWCCC	1993
Tonie Carroll	Beenleigh State High QSSRL	1993
Jason Donegan	Cambridge Park High NSWCHS	1993
Wayne Evans	St Gregory's College, Campbelltown NSWCCC	1993
Solomon Haumono	Christian Brothers, Lewisham NSWCCC	1993
Jason Holland	Quirindi High NSWCHS	1993
Phillip Howlett	John Paul II College, Marayong NSWCCC	1993
Byron Hutton	Leumeah High NSWCHS	1993
Chris Morcombe	De La Salle College, Ashfield NSWCCC	1993
Anthony Mundine	Kingsgrove High NSWCHS	1993
Colin Murphy	Windsor High NSWCHS	1993
Mick O'Neill	Lake Ginninderra College ACT	1993
Brendon Reeves	Yanco Agricultural High NSWCHS	1993, 1994
Adam Ritson	De La Salle College, Cronulla NSWCCC	1993
Dean Saddler	Erindale College ACT	1993
Jeremy Smith	Palm Beach Currumbin State High QSSRL	1993
Ben Walker	St Mary's College, Toowoomba QSSRL	1993
Jed Abad	John Paul II College, Marayong NSWCCC	1994
Owen Craigie	St Francis Xavier College, Newcastle NSWCCC	1994, 1995, 1996
Jason Ferris	Erindale College ACT	1994
Ben Ikin	Palm Beach Currumbin State High QSSRL	1994
Aaron Ketchell	Tully State High QSSRL	1994
Brett Kimmorley	Belmont High NSWCHS	1994
Peter Marrapodi	Erindale College ACT	1994
David Pearce	Erindale College ACT	1994, 1995
Troy Perkins	Holy Cross College, Ryde NSWCCC	1994
Luke Priddis	St Edmund's College ACT	1994
Dean Raper	Kingsgrove High NSWCHS	1994
Russell Richardson	St Gregory's College, Campbelltown NSWCCC	1994
Nick Stanton	Erindale College ACT	1994
Scott Tyson	John Paul II College, Marayong NSWCCC	1994
Ben Warwick	Erindale College ACT	1994
Bart Williams	Kingsgrove High NSWCHS	1994
Michael Withers	John Paul II College, Marayong NSWCCC	1994
David Atkins	Erindale College ACT	1995
Trent Barrett	St Gregory's College, Campbelltown NSWCCC	1995
Danny Buderus	St Francis Xavier College, Newcastle NSWCCC	1995
Nathan Cayless	Parramatta Marist High NSWCCC	1995, 1996
Kim Corbett	Sarah Redfern High NSWCHS	1995
Steven Crouch	Parramatta Marist High NSWCCC	1995
Ronald Davis	Erindale College ACT	1995
Matthew Gidley	Glendale Technology High NSWCHS	1995
Keiron Herring	Patrician Brothers, Fairfield NSWCCC	1995
Dallas Hood	Keebra Park State High QSSRL	1995
Ata Isarabhakdi	Hawker College ACT	1995
Ronald Jones	Sarah Redfern High NSWCHS	1995
Brian Leauma	Lithgow High NSWCHS	1995, 1996
Royston Lightning	Erindale College ACT	1995, 1996
Andrew McFadden	Hawker College ACT	1995
Duncan McGillivray	Richmond High NSWCHS	1995
Kevin McGuinness	Sarah Redfern High NSWCHS	1995
Leigh McWilliams	Singleton High NSWCHS	1995
Dennis Moran	Duval High NSWCHS	1995
Jarrod O'Doherty	St Francis Xavier College, Newcastle NSWCCC	1995
Daniel Quinn	All Saints College, Maitland NSWCCC	1995
Ted Simpson	Erindale College ACT	1995, 1996
Bradley Thompson	St Mary's College, Toowoomba QSSRL	1995
Shane Walker	St Mary's College, Toowoomba QSSRL	1995
Trent Burns	Bomaderry High NSWCHS	1996
Ben Galea	John Paul II College, Marayong NSWCCC	1996
David Hicks	Marist Catholic College, North Shore NSWCCC	1996
Ray Hunter	John Paul II College, Marayong NSWCCC	1996
Mark McLinden	Hawker College ACT	1996, 1997
Todd Payten	Erindale College ACT	1996
Adam Perry	Junee High NSWCHS	1996
Frank Puletua	John Paul II College, Marayong NSWCCC	1996
Tony Puletua	John Paul II College, Marayong NSWCCC	1996
Ben Rauter	Erindale College ACT	1996
Trent Runciman	Wellington High NSWCHS	1996
Chris Smith	John Paul II College, Marayong NSWCCC	1996
Terence Vaitusi	John Paul II College, Marayong NSWCCC	1996
Chris Walker	St Mary's College, Toowoomba QSSRL	1996
Rhys Wesser	Emmaus College, Rockhampton QSSRL	1996
Luke Bailey	Warilla High NSWCHS	1997
Lenny Beckett	Westfields Sports High NSWCHS	1997, 1998
Dane Carlaw	Padua College QSSRL	1997
Paul Dal Santo	Dapto High NSWCHS	1997
Barry Davis	Patrician Brothers, Fairfield NSWCCC	1997
Craig Frawley	Southern Cross College QSSRL	1997
Daniel Heckenberg	St Gregory's College, Campbelltown NSWCCC	1997
Michael Hodgson	St Francis Xavier College, Newcastle NSWCCC	1997
Casey McGuire	Caloundra State High QSSRL	1997
Brad Meyers	Villanova College QSSRL	1997
Luke Patten	Keira High, Wollongong NSWCHS	1997
Joel Penny	Kincumber High NSWCHS	1997
Blake Revell	St Gregory's College, Campbelltown NSWCCC	1997
Chad Robinson	Parramatta Marist High NSWCCC	1997
Robert Stolk	Westfields Sports High NSWCHS	1997
Troy Thompson	Dickson College ACT	1997
Luke Branighan	Marcellin College, Randwick NSWCCC	1998, 1999
Mark Bryant	Cootamundra High NSWCHS	1998
Luke Burt	Whitebridge High NSWCHS	1998
Trent Estatheo	All Saints College, Maitland NSWCCC	1998
Brett Finch	Erindale College ACT	1998
Mark Gasnier	Peakhurst High NSWCHS	1998, 1999
Ashley Harrison	Wavell State High QSSRL	1998
Justin Hodges	Cairns State High QSSRL	1998, 1999
Ben Jeffries	Forster High NSWCHS	1998
Brent Kite	Erindale College ACT	1998
Michael Korkidas	Marist College, Kogarah NSWCCC	1998
Terry Martin	Erindale College ACT	1998
Chris Muckert	Townsville Grammar QSSRL	1998
Mark Riddell	Holy Cross College, Ryde NSWCCC	1998
John Rowbotham	Kirwan State High QSSRL	1998, 1999
Jamie Russo	Marcellin College, Randwick NSWCCC	1998
Michael Ryan	St Edmund's College, Ipswich QSSRL	1998
John Shillington	Padua College QSSRL	1998
Alan Tongue	Farrer Agricultural High NSWCHS	1998
Warren Aiken	St Edmund's College ACT	1999
Braith Anasta	Marcellin College, Randwick NSWCCC	1999
Greg Boulos	Westfields Sports High NSWCHS	1999
Trent Clayton	Tullawong State High QSSRL	1999
Blake Henzell	Palm Beach Currumbin State High QSSRL	1999
Daniel Irvine	Parramatta Marist High NSWCCC	1999
Nathan Jordan	Palm Beach Currumbin State High QSSRL	1999
Junior Langi	Trinity Catholic College, Auburn NSWCCC	1999
Arthur Little	Erindale College ACT	1999
Micheal Luck	Kirwan State High QSSRL	1999
Jamie Lyon	Parramatta Marist High NSWCCC	1999
Mark Minichiello	Westfields Sports High NSWCHS	1999
Daniel Ninness	St Joseph's College, Port Macquarie NSWCCC	1999
Christian Orsini	Terra Sancta College NSWCCC	1999
Corey Parker	Beaudesert State High QSSRL	1999
Anthony Quinn	St Francis Xavier College, Newcastle NSWCCC	1999, 2000
Brett Sargent	Parramatta Marist High NSWCCC	1999
Danny Sullivan	Westfields Sports High NSWCHS	1999
Albert Talipeau	De La Salle College, Cronulla NSWCCC	1999
Brent Tate	Clontarf Beach State High QSSRL	1999
Shane Tronc	Wavell State High QSSRL	1999
Adam Woolnough	Taree High NSWCHS	1999
Manu Asoava	Terra Sancta College NSWCCC	2000
Allan Brookman	Erindale College ACT	2000
Joven Clarke	Westfields Sports High NSWCHS	2000
Ben Czislowski	Runcorn High QSSRL	2000
Brian Dangerfield	Palm Beach Currumbin State High QSSRL	2000
Brad Davis	Palm Beach Currumbin State High QSSRL	2000
Luke Dorn	All Saints College, Maitland NSWCCC	2000
Brett Finn	Bede Polding College, Windsor NSWCCC	2000
Brett Firman	St Joseph's College, Port Macquarie NSWCCC	2000
Eddie Harrison	Palm Beach Currumbin State High QSSRL	2000
Kai Holland	St Edward's College, Gosford NSWCCC	2000
Steve Irwin	St Luke's Anglican, Bundaberg QSSRL	2000
Pearce Kelly	Dickson College ACT	2000
Joel Monaghan	Erindale College ACT	2000
Junior Paulo	Patrician Brothers, Blacktown NSWCCC	2000
Andrew Price	Erindale College ACT	2000
Ashley Alberts	Kirwan State High QSSRL	2001
Greg Bird	Rutherford High NSWCHS	2001
Trevor Bowman	Kirwan State High QSSRL	2001
Stephen Goodhew	Kirwan State High QSSRL	2001, 2002
Luke Harlen	Kirwan State High QSSRL	2001
Nick Kouparitsas	Daramalan College ACT	2001
Josh McCartney	St Clare's Catholic High NSWCCC	2001
Bryan Norrie	Yanco Agricultural High NSWCHS	2001
Nick Parfitt	Maryborough State High QSSRL	2001
Darren Peachey	Terra Sancta College NSWCCC	2001
Stephen Ross	Kiama High NSWCHS	2001, 2002
Wade Russell	Patrician Brothers, Fairfield NSWCCC	2001
Michael Russo	Nudgee College QSSRL	2001
Brett Seymour	St Patrick's College, Mackay QSSRL	2001
Trevor Thurling	Dickson College ACT	2001
Michael Weyman	Erindale College ACT	2001, 2002
Joe Williams	Marcellin College, Randwick NSWCCC	2001
Russell Aitken	Cronulla High NSWCHS	2002
Jermaine Ale	Lambton High NSWCHS	2002
Jess Caine	Woolooware High NSWCHS	2002
Ryan Carmichael	Dickson College ACT	2002
Drew Donovan	Kirwan State High QSSRL	2002
Ben Farrell	St Mary's College, Toowoomba QSSRL	2002
Nick Fredericks	Daramalan College ACT	2002
Liam Fulton	Westfields Sports High NSWCHS	2002
Keith Galloway	Marist College, Kogarah NSWCCC	2002
Ben Green	Cavendish Road State High QSSRL	2002
Ben Hannant	Palm Beach Currumbin State High QSSRL	2002
Ryan Hoffman	St Gregory's College, Campbelltown NSWCCC	2002
Brenton Lawrence	Erindale College ACT	2002
Tom Learoyd-Lahrs	Farrer Agricultural High NSWCHS	2002, 2003
Heath L'Estrange	Terra Sancta College NSWCCC	2002, 2003
Jacob Lillyman	Kirwan State High QSSRL	2002
Luke Mercer	Hunter Sports High NSWCHS	2002
Dimitri Pelo	Palm Beach Currumbin State High QSSRL	2002
Justin Poore	Endeavour Sports High NSWCHS	2002
Scott Russell	St Dominic's College, Penrith NSWCCC	2002, 2003
Ashton Sims	Kiama High NSWCHS	2002
Tim Smith	Coombabah State High QSSRL	2002
Brad Wallace	All Saints College, Maitland NSWCCC	2002
James Andersen	Ignatius Park College QSSRL	2003
Brett Anderson	Innisfail State High QSSRL	2003
James Aubusson	St John's College, Woodlawn NSWCCC	2003
Daniel Backo	Palm Beach Currumbin State High QSSRL	2003, 2004
Dean Collis	Patrician Brothers, Fairfield NSWCCC	2003
Michael Dobson	Erindale College ACT	2003, 2004
Shane Eastwood	Keebra Park State High QSSRL	2003
Michael Greenfield	Westfields Sports High NSWCHS	2003
Karmichael Hunt	Anglican Church Grammar QSSRL	2003
Benji Marshall	Keebra Park State High QSSRL	2003
Feleti Mateo	Terra Sancta College NSWCCC	2003
Steve Meredith	Terra Sancta College NSWCCC	2003
Martin Mitchell	Palm Beach Currumbin State High QSSRL	2003
Brendan Oake	St Gregory's College, Campbelltown NSWCCC	2003
Sam Perrett	Palm Beach Currumbin State High QSSRL	2003
Ben Roberts	Patrician Brothers, Fairfield NSWCCC	2003
McConkie Tauasa	St Dominic's College, Penrith NSWCCC	2003
Nathan Armit	Westfields Sports High NSWCHS	2004
Michael Bond	Wavell State High QSSRL	2004
Blake Green	Westfields Sports High NSWCHS	2004
Greg Inglis	Wavell State High QSSRL	2004
Luke Jay	Erindale College ACT	2004
Cy Lasscock	Dickson College ACT	2004
Michael Lett	Sarah Redfern High NSWCHS	2004
Rhys Lovegrove	Endeavour Sports High NSWCHS	2004
Steven McLean	Erindale College ACT	2004
Steve Michaels	Palm Beach Currumbin State High QSSRL	2004
Peewee Moke	Endeavour Sports High NSWCHS	2004
Junior Moors	Patrician Brothers, Blacktown NSWCCC	2004
Jarrod Mullen	St Francis Xavier College, Newcastle NSWCCC	2004, 2005
Joel Rapana	Palm Beach Currumbin State High QSSRL	2004
Kade Snowden	Hunter Sports High NSWCHS	2004
Frank Winterstein	Endeavour Sports High NSWCHS	2004
Mitchell Aubusson	Xavier Catholic College, Ballina NSWCCC	2005
Benjamin Collins	Condell Park High, NSWCHS	2005
Darius Boyd	Palm Beach Currumbin State High QSSRL	2005
Mitch Brown	Endeavour Sports High NSWCHS	2005
Matt Cooper	St Francis Xavier College, Newcastle NSWCCC	2005
Daniel Isaac	Shailer Park State High QSSRL	2005
Michael Jennings	St Dominic's College, Penrith NSWCCC	2005
Kris Keating	Westfields Sports High NSWCHS	2005
Martin Lewis	Farrer Agricultural High NSWCHS	2005
Joel Moon	Morayfield State High QSSRL	2005
Ray Nasso	Terra Sancta College NSWCCC	2005
Cory Paterson	St Francis Xavier College, Newcastle NSWCCC	2005
Mitchell Pearce	Marist Catholic College, North Shore NSWCCC	2005, 2006
Eddy Pettybourne	Marcellin College, Randwick NSWCCC	2005
David Taylor	St Brendan's College, Yeppoon QSSRL	2005
Akuila Uate	Brisbane Water Secondary College NSWCHS	2005
Josh White	Daramalan College ACT	2005
Jay Aston	Brisbane State High QSSRL	2006
Joel Brown	St Philip's Christian College, Newcastle NSWCIS	2006
Luke Capewell	Redcliffe State High QSSRL	2006
Israel Folau	Marsden State High QSSRL	2006
Liam Foran	Marist Catholic College, North Shore NSWCCC	2006
Obadiah Geia	Kirwan State High QSSRL	2006
David Hala	Southern Cross College QSSRL	2006
Chris Lawrence	St Gregory's College, Campbelltown NSWCCC	2006
Tim Mannah	Christian Community High NSWCIS	2006
Willie Mataka	St Gregory's College, Campbelltown NSWCCC	2006
Will Matthews	Palm Beach Currumbin State High QSSRL	2006
Luke Muttdon	Kiama High NSWCHS	2006
Joseph Paulo	Patrician Brothers, Blacktown NSWCCC	2006
Kevin Proctor	Palm Beach Currumbin State High QSSRL	2006, 2007
Tim Robinson	Patrician Brothers, Blacktown NSWCCC	2006
Chris Sandow	Marsden State High QSSRL	2006
Nathan Strudwick	John Paul College QSSRL	2006
Peni Tagive	St Gregory's College, Campbelltown NSWCCC	2006
Joel Thompson	Red Bend Catholic College, Forbes NSWCCC	2006
Aiden Tolman	St Paul's College, Kempsey NSWCCC	2006
Shannon Walker	Palm Beach Currumbin State High QSSRL	2006
Jeremiah Walters	Marsden State High QSSRL	2006
Cameron White	Oxley High NSWCHS	2006
Jason Baitieri	Oakhill College, Castle Hill NSWCIS	2007
Lachlan Coote	Windsor High NSWCHS	2007
Jarrod Croker	Mulwaree High, NSWCHS	2007
Kieran Foran	Marist Catholic College, North Shore NSWCCC	2007
Jake Friend	Noosa District State High QSSRL	2007
Ryan Hansen	Brisbane State High QSSRL	2007
Brad Hudson	Vincentia High NSWCHS	2007
Ben Hunt	St Brendan's College, Yeppoon QSSRL	2007
Martin Kennedy	Matraville Sports High NSWCHS	2007
Andrew McCullough	Brisbane State High QSSRL	2007
Jon Mannah	Christian Community High NSWCIS	2007
Daniel Mortimer	James Sheahan Catholic High, Orange NSWCCC	2007
Jeremy Papamau	Hunter Sports High NSWCHS	2007
Ben Ridge	St Brendan's College, Yeppoon QSSRL	2007
Ryan Stig	St Philip's Christian College, Newcastle NSWCIS	2007
Wes Suckley	Coonabarabran High NSWCHS	2007
Greg Waddell	St Dominic's College, Penrith NSWCCC	2007
Troyden Watene-Edwards	Wavell State High QSSRL	2007
Ryan Williamson	St Patrick's College, Mackay QSSRL	2007
Ronnie Alovili	Palm Beach Currumbin State High QSSRL	2008
Tim Auremi	St Paul's Catholic College, Greystanes NSWCCC	2008
Kurt Baptiste	Wavell State High QSSRL	2008
Ethan Cook	Hunter Sports High NSWCHS	2008
Jacob Denford	Engadine High NSWCHS	2008
Daniel Galati	Westfields Sports High NSWCHS	2008
William Hopoate	Cromer Campus NSWCHS	2008
Jamal Idris	LaSalle Catholic College, Bankstown NSWCCC	2008
Ryan James	Palm Beach Currumbin State High QSSRL	2008, 2009
Albert Kelly	Patrician Brothers, Blacktown NSWCCC	2008
Peter Mata'utia	Hunter Sports High NSWCHS	2008
Jordan Rankin	Palm Beach Currumbin State High QSSRL	2008, 2009
Junior Roqica	Holy Cross College, Ryde NSWCCC	2008
Neenan Simpson	La Salle College, Bankstown NSWCCC	2008
Martin Taupau	Endeavour Sports High NSWCHS	2008
Jarrod Thompson	St Gregory's College, Campbelltown NSWCCC	2008
Dominic Walsh	Matraville Sports High NSWCHS	2008
Aaron Woods	Holy Cross College, Ryde NSWCCC	2008
Matthew Wright	Patrician Brothers, Blacktown NSWCCC	2008
Daniel Ahsin	Endeavour Sports High NSWCHS	2009
PJ Asiata	Patrician Brothers, Blacktown NSWCCC	2009
Blake Austin	St Dominic's College, Penrith NSWCCC	2009
Cheyse Blair	Tweed River High NSWCHS	2009
Faleula Fimau	Matraville Sports High NSWCHS	2009
Jake Finn	Hunter Sports High NSWCHS	2009
Matt Groat	St Gregory's College, Campbelltown NSWCCC	2009, 2010
Haydon Hodge	Erindale College ACT	2009
Cameron King	Endeavour Sports High NSWCHS	2009
Joseph Leilua	Endeavour Sports High NSWCHS	2009
Jacob Miller	Matraville Sports High NSWCHS	2009
Michael Morgan	Ignatius Park College QSSRL	2009
Maipele Morseau	St Brendan's College, Yeppoon QSSRL	2009
Sam Saville	Palm Beach Currumbin State High QSSRL	2009
Jack Stockwell	St Gregory's College, Campbelltown NSWCCC	2009
Jason Taumalolo	Kirwan State High QSSRL	2009
Aaron Whitchurch	Wavell State High QSSRL	2009
Lachlan Burr	Picnic Point High NSWCHS	2010
Paul Carter	Homebush Boys High NSWCHS	2010
Michael Chee-Kam	Erindale College ACT	2010
Cameron Cullen	Palm Beach Currumbin State High QSSRL	2010
Matthew Eisenhuth	St Paul's Catholic College, Greystanes NSWCCC	2010
Anthony Gadd	Wavell State High QSSRL	2010
Jacob Gagan	Westfields Sports High NSWCHS	2010
Chris Grevsmuhl	Ignatius Park College QSSRL	2010
Sam Irwin	Palm Beach Currumbin State High QSSRL	2010
Trent Jennings	Westfields Sports High NSWCHS	2010
David Klemmer	Westfields Sports High NSWCHS	2010, 2011
Gerard McCallum	The Hills Sports High NSWCHS	2010
Tautau Moga	St Peter Claver College, Ipswich QSSRL	2010
David Nofoaluma	John Therry Catholic College, Rosemeadow NSWCCC	2010
Luke Pickerd	St Patrick's College, Sutherland NSWCCC	2010
Chad Redman	Hunter Sports High NSWCHS	2010
Iain Riccardi	Wavell State High QSSRL	2010
Harry Siejka	Patrician Brothers, Blacktown NSWCCC	2010
James Tedesco	St Gregory's College, Campbelltown NSWCCC	2010
Vaipuna Tia Kilifi	St Dominic's College, Penrith NSWCCC	2010
Francis Veukiso	Kirwan State High QSSRL	2010
Henare Wells	Keebra Park State High QSSRL	2010
Jack Wighton	Erindale College ACT	2010
Kane Elgey	Palm Beach Currumbin State High QSSRL	2011
Adam Elliott	St Gregory's College, Campbelltown NSWCCC	2011, 2012
Jamal Fogarty	Palm Beach Currumbin State High QSSRL	2011
Matiu Fukofuka	Bass High NSWCHS	2011
Sam Harrold	Palm Beach Currumbin State High QSSRL	2011
George Jennings	Patrician Brothers, Blacktown NSWCCC	2011
Richard Kennar	Craigieburn Secondary College CAS	2011
Samisoni Langi	Trinity Catholic College, Auburn NSWCCC	2011
Nene MacDonald	Kirwan State High QSSRL	2011
Pat Mata'utia	Hunter Sports High NSWCHS	2011
Junior Paulo	Ashcroft High NSWCHS	2011
Lloyd Perrett	Palm Beach Currumbin State High QSSRL	2011
Kurtis Rowe	Keebra Park State High QSSRL	2011
Brenden Santi	Bass High NSWCHS	2011
Curtis Sironen	Holy Cross College, Ryde NSWCCC	2011
Jake Trbojevic	Pittwater High NSWCHS	2011
Andrew Vela	Keebra Park State High QSSRL	2011
Luke Vescio	St Augustine's College, Brookvale NSWCIS	2011
Jai Arrow	Keebra Park State High QSSRL	2012
Luke Brooks	Holy Cross College, Ryde NSWCCC	2012
Jeremy Cropper	St Francis Xavier College ACT	2012
Brad Deitz	Holy Cross College, Ryde NSWCCC	2012
Jack Goodsell	Keebra Park State High QSSRL	2012
Clint Gutherson	Freshwater High School NSWCHS	2012
Alex Johnston	Endeavour Sports High NSWCHS	2012
Matthew Lodge	Terra Sancta College NSWCCC	2012
Chad McGill	Patrician Brothers, Blacktown NSWCCC	2012
Willis Meehan	Matraville Sports High NSWCHS	2012
Mitchell Moses	Holy Cross College, Ryde NSWCCC	2012
Pauli Pauli	Patrician Brothers, Blacktown NSWCCC	2012
Paul Simona	Patrician Brothers, Blacktown NSWCCC	2012
Chris Smith	Patrician Brothers, Blacktown NSWCCC	2012
Kelepi Tanginoa	Westfields Sports High NSWCHS	2012
Dylan Walker	Matraville Sports High NSWCHS	2012
Elijah Alick	Cavendish Road State High QSSRL	2013
Michael Barclay	Kirwan State High QSSRL	2013
Nathan Davis	James Busby High NSWCHS	2013
George Fai	Marsden State High QSSRL	2013
Tom Freebairn	Illawarra Sports High NSWCHS	2013
Tyrell Fuimaono	Patrician Brothers, Blacktown NSWCCC	2013, 2014
Jackson Hastings	Illawarra Sports High NSWCHS	2013
Royce Hunt	Bass High NSWCHS	2013
Vincent Leuluai	Sarah Redfern High NSWCHS	2013
Joey Lussick	Newington College NSWCIS	2013
Lamar Liolevave	Keebra Park State High QSSRL	2013
Sione Mata'utia	Hunter Sports High NSWCHS	2013
Jayden Nikorima	Wavell State High QSSRL	2013
Marion Seve	Keebra Park State High QSSRL	2013
Charlie Taylor	St Augustine's College, Brookvale NSWCIS	2013
Jenan Wedderburn-Parrish	Australian Industry Trade College, Robina QSSRL	2013
Cheyne Whitelaw	Marcellin College, Randwick NSWCCC	2013
Tom Amone	The Hills Sports High NSWCHS	2014
Jayden Brailey	Aquinas College, Menai NSWCCC	2014
Nat Butcher	Marcellin College, Randwick NSWCCC	2014
Oliver Clark	Terra Sancta College NSWCCC	2014
Jack Cogger	Mackillop Catholic College, Warnervale NSWCCC	2014
Tevita Cottrell	Patrician Brothers, Blacktown NSWCCC	2014
Connor Cox	Morayfield State High QSSRL	2014
Troy Dargan	Knox Grammar School, Wahroonga NSWCIS	2014
Gideon Gela-Mosby	Kirwan State High QSSRL	2014
Keegan Hipgrave	Palm Beach Currumbin State High QSSRL	2014
Jacob Host	De La Salle College, Cronulla NSWCCC	2014
Brock Lamb	All Saints College, Maitland NSWCCC	2014
Luciano Leilua	Endeavour Sports High NSWCHS	2014
Jacob Liddle	Wadalba High NSWCHS	2014
Latrell Mitchell	Champagnat Catholic College Pagewood NSWCCC	2014
Ashleigh Nisbet	St Gregory's College, Campbelltown NSWCCC	2014
John Olive	Endeavour Sports High NSWCHS	2014
Braden Robson	St Francis Xavier College, Newcastle NSWCCC	2014
Darryn Schonig	Kirwan State High QSSRL	2014
Hame Sele	Kingsgrove High NSWCHS	2014
Ray Stone	Wollondilly Anglican College NSWCIS	2014
Connor Tracey	Woolooware High NSWCHS	2014
Keenan Yorston	Wavell State High QSSRL	2014
Blayke Brailey	Aquinas College, Menai NSWCCC	2015, 2016
Jayden Butterfield	All Saints College, Maitland NSWCCC	2015
Jye Challenor	Westfields Sports High NSWCHS	2015
Nathan Cleary	St Dominic's College, Penrith NSWCCC	2015
Reuben Cotter	Sarina State High QSSRL	2015
Scott Drinkwater	Terrigal High School NSWCHS	2015
David Fauid	Wavell State High QSSRL	2015
Reuben Garrick	Kiama High NSWCHS	2015
Adam Keighran	Endeavour Sports High NSWCHS	2015
Kye Madden	Wollondilly Anglican College NSWCIS	2015
Thomas Mikaele	Keebra Park State High QSSRL	2015, 2016
Cameron Murray	Newington College NSWCIS	2015
Ryan Papenhuyzen	Oakhill College NSWCIS	2015
Tyronne Roberts-Davis	Keebra Park State High QSSRL	2015
Curtis Scott	Endeavour Sports High NSWCHS	2015
Daniel Vasquez	St Patrick's College, Sutherland NSWCCC	2015
Tre Williams	Karabar High NSWCHS	2015
Tui Afualo	Westfields Sports High NSWCHS	2016
Dean Blore	The Hills Sports High NSWCHS	2016
Billy Burns	McCarthy Catholic College, Emu Plains, NSWCCC	2016
Nick Cotric	Erindale College ACT	2016
Josh Curran	Patrician Brothers, Blacktown NSWCCC	2016
Campbell Graham	Marcellin College, Randwick NSWCCC	2016, 2017
Payne Haas	Keebra Park State High QSSRL	2016
Mawene Hiroti	Matraville Sports High NSWCHS	2016
Daniel Keir	Erindale College ACT	2016
Sean Keppie	Westfields Sports High NSWCHS	2016
Lachlan Lam	Marcellin College, Randwick NSWCCC	2016
Zac Lomax	Figtree High NSWCHS	2016, 2017
Sean O'Sullivan	Patrician Brothers, Blacktown NSWCCC	2016
Reece Robson	Endeavour Sports High NSWCHS	2016
Pasami Saulo	Hunter Sports High NSWCHS	2016
Michael Tupou	Patrician Brothers, Blacktown NSWCCC	2016
Shawn Blore	The Hills Sports High NSWCHS	2017
Tanah Boyd	Keebra Park State High QSSRL	2017
Jesse Cronin	The Hills Sports High NSWCHS	2017
Haze Dunster	The Hills Sports High NSWCHS	2017
David Fifita	Keebra Park State High QSSRL	2017
Luke Huth	Hunter Sports High NSWCHS	2017
Spencer Leniu	Patrician Brothers, Blacktown NSWCCC	2017
Ethan Parry	St Gregory's College, Campbelltown NSWCCC	2017
Ky Rodwell	Matraville Sports High NSWCHS	2017
James Roumanos	Aquinas College, Menai NSWCCC	2017
Kyle Schneider	The Hills Sports High NSWCHS	2017
Dylan Smith	Endeavour Sports High NSWCHS	2017
Lindsay Smith	Westfields Sports High NSWCHS	2017
Teig Wilton	Endeavour Sports High NSWCHS	2017
Bronson Xerri	Endeavour Sports High NSWCHS	2017
Timanu Alexander	All Saints College, Maitland NSWCCC	2018
Max Altus	Farrer Agricultural High NSWCHS	2018
Jalal Bazzaz	Illawarra Sports High NSWCHS	2018
Bradman Best	Brisbane Water Secondary College NSWCHS	2018
Zac Cini	St Dominic's College, Penrith NSWCCC	2018
Juwan Compain	Palm Beach Currumbin State High QSSRL	2018
Stephen Crichton	Patrician Brothers, Blacktown NSWCCC	2018
Harry Croker	Taree High NSWCHS	2018
Thomas Dearden	Palm Beach Currumbin State High QSSRL	2018
Matthew Doorey	Westfields Sports High NSWCHS	2018
Matthew Dragisic	Marist College Canberra ACT	2018
Ryan Gray	De La Salle College, Revesby Heights NSWCCC	2018
Jock Madden	All Saints College, Maitland NSWCCC	2018
Ratu Nanovo	Cambridge Park High NSWCHS	2018
Fanitesi Niu	Marsden State High QSSRL	2018
Franklin Pele	Endeavour Sports High NSWCHS	2018
Jason Saab	Westfields Sports High NSWCHS	2018
Tommy Talau	Westfields Sports High NSWCHS	2018
Jayden Tanner	Patrician Brothers, Blacktown NSWCCC	2018
Penisimani Teaupa	Holy Cross College, Ryde NSWCCC	2018
Starford To'a	Newcastle High School NSWCHS	2018
Sean Vaivelata	St Augustine's College, Brookvale NSWCIS	2018
Mitchell Black	St Mary's Catholic College, Gateshead NSWCCC	2019
Jayden Clarkson	Wavell State High QSSRL	2019
Mat Feagai	Illawarra Sports High NSWCHS	2019
Max Feagai	Illawarra Sports High NSWCHS	2019
Tyler Field	Patrician Brothers, Blacktown NSWCCC	2019
Lachlan Gale	Marcellin College, Randwick NSWCCC	2019
Thomas Giles	Marcellin College, Randwick NSWCCC	2019
Jack Howarth	Brisbane Boys' College QSSRL	2019
Samuel Loizou	Patrician Brothers, Blacktown NSWCCC	2019
Trey Mooney	Westfields Sports High NSWCHS	2019
Brendan Piakura	Palm Beach Currumbin State High QSSRL	2019
Toby Sexton	Palm Beach Currumbin State High QSSRL	2019
Hamiso Tabuai-Fidow	Kirwan State High QSSRL	2019
Cooper Talau	Westfields Sports High NSWCHS	2019
Jackson Topine	East Hills Boys High NSWCHS	2019
Sam Walker	Ipswich Grammar School QSSRL	2019
Reece Walsh	Keebra Park State High QSSRL	2019
Michael Asomua	Erindale College ACT	2021
Lachlan Blackburn	St Dominic's College, Penrith NSWCCC	2021
Jock Brazel	Parramatta Marist High NSWCCC	2021
Ryan Couchman	Bulli High School NSWCHS	2021
Jack Cullen	Palm Beach Currumbin State High QSSRL	2021
Dudley Dotoi	Kirwan State High QSSRL	2021
Tom Duffy	Ignatius Park College QSSRL	2021
Ryan Foran	Palm Beach Currumbin State High QSSRL	2021
Luke Jack	Ignatius Park College QSSRL	2021
Deine Mariner	Palm Beach Currumbin State High QSSRL	2021
Brad Morkos	Figtree High NSWCHS	2021
Blake Mozer	Keebra Park State High QSSRL	2021
Jaxson Rahme	Holy Cross College, Ryde NSWCCC	2021
John Sagaga	Patrician Brothers, Blacktown NSWCCC	2021
Ryley Smith	St Dominic's College, Penrith NSWCCC	2021
Ragarive Wavik	Kirwan State High QSSRL	2021
Tom Weaver	Palm Beach Currumbin State High QSSRL	2021
Chris Faagutu	Marsden State High QSSRL	2022
Ethan Ferguson	Lambton High NSWCHS	2022
Thomas Fletcher	St Gregory's College, Campbelltown NSWCCC	2022
Henry Hassett	The Hills Sports High NSWCHS	2022
Arama Hau	Keebra Park State High QSSRL	2022
Isaiya Katoa	Barker College NSWCIS	2022
Keano Kini	Palm Beach Currumbin State High QSSRL	2022
Liam Le Blanc	Nudgee College QSSRL	2022
Jesse McLean	Newington College NSWCIS	2022
Karl Oloapu	Wavell State High QSSRL	2022
Josiah Pahulu	Ipswich State High QSSRL	2022
Joash Papali'i	Holy Spirit College, Lakemba NSWCCC	2022
Michael Roberts	Palm Beach Currumbin State High QSSRL	2022
Gabriel Satrick	Ipswich State High QSSRL	2022
Chevy Stewart	Endeavour Sports High NSWCHS	2022
Blaize Talagi	Westfields Sports High NSWCHS	2022
Sam Tuivaiti	Westfields Sports High School NSWCHS	2022
Jordan Miller	Patrician Brothers' College, Fairfield NSWCCC	2022
Logan Aoake	St Francis Xavier College, Newcastle NSWCCC	2023
Mutua Brown	The Cathedral College, Rockhampton QSSRL	2023
Hayden Buchanan	Kiama High NSWCHS	2023
Xavier Caccitotti	Erindale College ACT	2023
Wilson De Courcey	Patrician Brothers, Blacktown NSWCCC	2023
Jaxen Edgar	St Dominic's College, Penrith NSWCCC	2023
Jezaiah Funa-Iuta	Patrician Brothers, Fairfield NSWCCC	2023
Lachlan Galvin	Westfields Sports High NSWCHS	2023
Jacob Halangahu	Patrician Brothers, Blacktown NSWCCC	2023, 2024
Cody Hopwood	All Saints College, Maitland NSWCCC	2023, 2024
Kaiden Lahrs	Kirwan State High QSSRL	2023
Finau Latu	Patrician Brothers, Blacktown NSWCCC	2023
Casey McLean	Newington College NSWCIS	2023
Loko Pasifiki Tonga	Endeavour Sports High NSWCHS	2023
Riley Pollard	St Dominic's College, Penrith NSWCCC	2023
Logan Spinks	Farrer Agricultural High NSWCHS	2023
De La Salle Va'a	Marcellin College, Randwick NSWCCC	2023
Nikora Williams	Endeavour Sports High NSWCHS	2023, 2024
Jack Attard	St Dominic's College, Penrith NSWCCC	2024
Luke Tuialii	Erindale College ACT	2024
Sam Stephenson	Palm Beach Currumbin State High School QRSS	2024
Mason Barber	Keebra Park State High School QRSS	2024
Mitchell Woods	St Patrick's College Strathfield NSWCIS	2024
Toby Rodwell	Newington College NSWCIS	2024
Alex Challenor	De La Salle College Caringbah NSWCCC	2024
Lachlan Coinakis	Patrician Brothers, Blacktown NSWCCC	2024
Zac Garton	Caloundra State High School QRSS	2024
Thomas Dellow	Endeavour Sports High NSWCHS	2024, 2025
Jared Haywood	Patrician Brothers, Blacktown NSWCCC	2024
Simione Laiaf	Bass High School NSWCHS	2024
Ryda Talagi	Westfields Sports High NSWCHS	2024
Tyson Sangalang	Patrician Brothers, Blacktown NSWCCC	2024
Lincoln Fletcher	The Hills Sports High NSWCHS	2024
Cameron Bamblett	Patrician Brothers' College, Blacktown NSWCCC	2025
Filipe Fakauho	Matraville Sports High School NSWCHS	2025
Toby Winter	Hunter Sports High School NSWCHS	2025
Dayne Jennings	Central Coast Sports College NSWCIS	2025
Antonio Verhoeven	Palm Beach Currumbin State High School QRSS	2025
Callum Grantham	Newington College NSWCIS	2025
Toby Batten	Nambucca Heads High School NSWCHS	2025
Jackson Koina	Mountain Creek State High School QRSS	2025
Liam Bell	Hills Sports High School NSWCHS	2025
Jake White	Endeavour Sports High School NSWCHS	2025
Pheonix Godinet	Bass High School NSWCHS	2025
Darcy Smith	Kincumber High School NSWCHS	2025
Hayden Watson	Marsden State High School QRSS	2025
Roman Tuaimau	Patrician Brothers' College, Blacktown NSWCCC	2025
Xzavier Timoteo	Ipswich State High School QRSS	2025
Christopher Petrus	Patrician Brothers' College, Blacktown NSWCCC	2025
David Bryenton	Keebra Park State High School QRSS	2025
Liam Martin	Westfields Sports High NSWCHS	2026
Cyrus Bloomfield	Oakhill College, Castle Hill NSWCIS	2026
William Manning	Hunter Sports High NSWCHS	2026
Callum Elsley	Kuri Kuri High School NSWCHS	2026
Cornelius Pupualii	Patrician Brothers' College, Blacktown NSWCCC	2026
Chase Butler	All Saints College, Maitland NSWCCC	2026
Liam Challenor	Endeavour Sports High School NSWCHS	2026
Steven Nunn	Patrician Brothers' College, Blacktown NSWCCC	2026
Jai Bilish	Palm Beach Currumbin State High School QRSS	2026
Jamie Curran	Endeavour Sports High School NSWCHS	2026
Curtis Mulherin	Hunter Sports High NSWCHS	2026
Kalani Patu	Keebra Park State High School QRSS	2026
Charlie Xuereb	Patrician Brothers' College, Blacktown NSWCCC	2026
Jireh-Trey Stewart	Bass High School NSWCHS	2026
Cooper Townsend	Hunter Sports High NSWCHS	2026
Cordell Arama	Patrician Brothers' College, Blacktown NSWCCC	2026
Hayden Bell	Westfields Sports High NSWCHS	2026
Riley Rostron	All Saints College, Maitland NSWCCC	2026
