= East Hills Boys High School =

Location
- Panania, New South Wales; Australia; 33.9572°S 150.9941°E

Information
- Former name: East Hills Boys Technology High School
- School type: Public, comprehensive, single-sex, secondary school
- Motto: Latin: Servio (I Serve)
- Established: January 1955
- Sister school: East Hills Girls Technology High School
- Principal: Paul Abboud
- Grades: 7–12
- Enrolment: ~900+ (2013)
- Campus: Lucas Road
- Colours: Blue, black and white
- Website: easthillsb-h.schools.nsw.gov.au

East Hills Boys High School (abbreviated as EHBHS) known until 2011 as East Hills Boys Technology High School, is a boys school in Panania, a suburb in south-western Sydney, New South Wales, Australia, on Lucas Road. It is a single-sex boys' high school operated by the New South Wales Department of Education with students from years 7 to 12. The school was established in 1955.

== School history ==
The school was established in 1955 and was officially opened on 26 May 1956 by the Minister for Education, Bob Heffron. The first headmaster from 1955 to his retirement in 1963 was Michael Stephen Cannon. Heffron also officially opened the new assembly hall on 6 August 1959, with the hall subsequently named the "R. J. Heffron Hall" in his honour.

=== Principals ===
Years	Name
1955–1963	Michael Stephen Cannon, B.A.
1963–1965	L. E. Jones
1966–1978	T. C. Wallis
1979–1983	G. C. Franks
1984–1986	B. S. Byrnes
1987–1987	S. R. Jacob
1988–1996	R. K. Morris
1997–1999	C. J. South
1999–2000	C. Preece
2000–2000	P. McSeveny
2001–2012	Roderick Brooks
2013–2018	Kevin Elgood
2018–2019	Karen Savins
2019–present	Paul Abboud

== Notable alumni ==
- Glenn Brookes – politician; Liberal Member for East Hills, 2011 to 2019
- John Dale AO – former president of the Australian Dental Association
- Lyall Gorman – CEO of the Cronulla-Sutherland Sharks and former A-League executive
- Wayne Holdsworth – former member of the New South Wales Cricket Team
- Andy Patmore – former rugby league player
- Corey Richards – former member of the New South Wales Cricket Team
- Tanveer Sangha – T20 Cricketer in the BBL
- Ian Thorpe OAM – swimmer; five time Olympic champion, eleven time World Champion, four times World Swimmer of the Year, 2000 Young Australian of the Year
- Jackson Topine – rugby league player
- Scott McKenzie – 2011/12 Late Model Racing Queensland (LMRQ) Rookie of the Year.
- Mark Waugh AM – former cricketer who held the world record for most catches in Test matches from 2001 until 2009 (181)
- Steve Waugh AO – former captain of Australian cricket team, the most capped Test player and most prolific winning captain in history
- Graham Windeatt – silver medallist in 1500m freestyle at 1972 Summer Olympics

=== Notable former staff ===
- Bill Collins OAM – former English teacher; film critic and historian, radio and television presenter
- John Dyson – former computing and IT teacher – Australian one day and test cricketer, and current West Indian team coach
- Peter Hadfield – former sportsmaster – Australian Olympic and Commonwealth decathlon athlete
- Tracey Menzies – former art and physical education teacher – swimming coach, most known for coaching Ian Thorpe, and at the Australian Institute of Sport

== See also ==
- List of government schools in New South Wales (D-F)
- East Hills Girls High School
- Education in Australia
