= Susan Foley =

Australian historian

Susan Foley FAHA
- Born: Susan Kathleen Foley; 3 March 1949 (age 77); Sydney, Australia
- Education: Murdoch University
- Occupation: Historian
- Spouse(s): Peter Grogan (m. 1971) Charles Sowerwine (m. 2006)
- Writing career
- Pen name: Susan K. Grogan
- Language: English

Susan Kathleen Foley FAHA (born 3 March 1949) is an Australian historian who specialises in French history, particularly in relation to French gender history, feminism and socialism. From 1992 to 2000, she published under her married name of Susan K. Grogan.

== Early life and education ==
Foley was born in Sydney in 1949 to Lawrence Foley, a railway worker, and Josephine Gooley, a hospital bookkeeper. She was educated at St Mary's Dominican Convent in Maitland, and then studied teaching at Catholic Teachers' College in North Sydney and worked as a secondary school teacher.

In 1971, Foley moved to Karratha, Western Australia where she began studying for a Bachelor of Arts by correspondence at the University of Western Australia. She completed the degree with first class honours at Murdoch University, where she also completed a PhD in 1986.

== Academic career ==
Foley lectured for a year at Murdoch, then moved to New Zealand to take a role lecturing in history at the Victoria University of Wellington in 1987. She was promoted to senior lecturer in 1993, and was head of the university's history department twice. In 2002, she became an associate professor in history. In 2006, she returned to Australia where she joined the University of Melbourne as Principal Fellow in History. She was elected a Fellow of the Australian Academy of the Humanities in 2007.

== Works ==
- Grogan, Susan K (27 February 1992), French socialism and sexual difference : women and the new society, 1803-44, Macmillan (published 1992), ISBN 978-0-333-52530-2
- Grogan, Susan K (1998), Flora Tristan : life stories, Routledge, ISBN 978-0-203-40857-5
- Foley, Susan K (2004), Women in France since 1789 : the meanings of difference, Palgrave Macmillan, ISBN 978-0-333-61993-3
- Foley, Susan K; Sowerwine, Charles, 1943- (20 March 2012), A political romance : Léon Gambetta, Léonie Léon and the making of the French Republic, 1872-82, Palgrave Macmillan (published 2012), ISBN 978-0-230-20686-1
