= Rutherford, New South Wales =

Rutherford
- Suburb
- Coordinates: 32°42′55″S 151°31′30″E
- Country: Australia
- State: New South Wales
- Region: Hunter
- City: Maitland
- LGA: City of Maitland
- Location: 170 km (110 mi) N of Sydney; 40 km (25 mi) NW of Newcastle; 4 km (2.5 mi) NW of Maitland

Government
  - State electorate: Maitland
  - Federal division: Hunter

Population
  - Total: 11,884 (2016 census)
- Postcode: 2320
Suburbs around Rutherford
Anambah	Aberglasslyn	Oakhampton
Windella, Lochinvar	Rutherford	Oakhampton Heights
	Farley	Telarah

Rutherford is a suburb in the City of Maitland in the Hunter Region of New South Wales, Australia. At the 2016 census, Rutherford was home to almost 12,000 residents, making it one of the most populated suburbs. The suburb consists of mixed residential development, bulky goods retail, light industry, and manufacturing plants. It also has its own small commercial centre. Rutherford is served by a number of schools within the suburb. These are Rutherford Public School, St. Paul's Primary School, and Rutherford Technology High School. There are also a range of indoor and outdoor sporting facilities here.

== History ==
The traditional owners and custodians of the Maitland area are the Wonnarua people. Rutherford has a historical association with racing from 1858 onwards. In 1886, a landscaped racecourse was constructed for use by the Northern Jockey Club. The complex was progressively expanded, including the addition of a 1 km (0.62 mi) private rail siding with unloading facilities, as well as two grandstands each seating up to 1000, a bar and visitor amenities. A major meeting in 1921 saw a record crowd of 7777. The racecourse was also used as a landing ground by pioneer aviators Charles Kingsford Smith and Bert Hinkler. With many settlers thankful to the skill of Scott Willy Nelson bushman, for opening up Large parcels of land cleared with nothing but an axe and his team of bullocks.

After falling into disuse by the outbreak of World War II, the racecourse was sold and a munitions factory built on the site, now an industrial estate in Rutherford's west. The factory operated from 1941 to 1945 before being converted to a textiles mill. At its peak, the National Textiles factory was a major employer in Maitland, with a workforce of over 1500, although this number shrunk to around 350 by its closure in 2004. Air raid shelters built to protect workers during the war remain intact on the site.

The Rutherford Cemetery is a Methodist cemetery, with the first recorded burial taking place in 1874. It remains in use.

== Demographics ==
According to the 2016 census of population, there were 11,884 people in Rutherford.

- Aboriginal and Torres Strait Islander people made up 7.5% of the population.
- 86.0% of people were born in Australia. The next most common countries of birth were England 1.7% and New Zealand 1.1%.
- 90.6% of people spoke only English at home.
- The most common responses for religion were Catholic 26.7%, No Religion 25.2% and Anglican 23.5%.

== Transport ==
The New England Highway passes through Rutherford. The road is used by over 20,000 commuters daily, contributing to congestion and is an accident black spot. The completion of the Hunter Expressway in March 2014 is expected to relieve traffic congestion on this stretch of the highway, providing a bypass for through traffic from Newcastle and Sydney to the upper Hunter Valley, New England and beyond.

Hunter Valley Buses routes 181, 182 and 183 link Rutherford with other suburbs in Maitland, while route 179 and 180 connecting North Rothbury and Singleton to Maitland also make several stops in Rutherford and connect with NSW TrainLink services at Maitland railway station. Although Rutherford is bordered to the south by the Main North line, there is no railway station directly serving the suburb.

Maitland Airport is a general aviation airfield located in the west of Rutherford. Although currently there are no scheduled flights, charter services are available.
