= Trevor Thurling =

Australian rugby league footballer

Personal information
- Full name: Trevor Thurling
- Born: 26 April 1984 (age 42) Queanbeyan, New South Wales, Australia

Playing information
- Height: 183 cm (6 ft 0 in)
- Weight: 102 kg (16 st 1 lb)
- Position: Second-row, Prop
Club
Years	Team	Pld	T	G	FG	P
2004–05	Canterbury Bulldogs	1	0	0	0	0
2006–12	Canberra Raiders	99	13	0	0	52
	Total	100	13	0	0	52

Trevor Thurling (born 26 April 1984) is an Australian former professional rugby league footballer who played in the 2000s and 2010s. He played as a second-row and prop for the Canberra Raiders and Canterbury Bankstown in the NRL.

== Playing career ==
Thurling was born in Queanbeyan, New South Wales and played his junior football with the Queanbeyan United Blues. While attending Dickson College in the Australian Capital Territory in 2001, Thurling was selected to play for the Australian Schoolboys team.

As 2004 NRL premiers, Canterbury faced Super League IX champions, Leeds in the 2005 World Club Challenge. Thurling played from the interchange bench in the Canterbury's 32–39 loss. In 2006, Thurling joined his boyhood club Canberra. He went on to play 99 first grade games for the club. In round 22 of the 2008 NRL season, he scored a hat-trick from the interchange bench as Canberra defeated Penrith 74-12.
