= Illawarra Sports High School =

Location
- Berkeley, New South Wales; Australia; 34°28′49″S 150°51′13″E

Information
- Former name: Berkeley High School (1956-1998)
- Type: Government-funded co-educational comprehensive and specialist secondary day school
- Motto: Latin: Integer vitae (Blameless in Life)
- Established: 1956; 70 years ago (as Berkeley High School)
- School district: Illawarra North; Regional South
- Educational authority: New South Wales Department of Education
- Specialist: Sports school
- Principal: Kerrie Powell
- Teaching staff: 64.3 FTE (2018)
- Years: 7–12
- Enrolment: 737 (2018)
- Campus type: Suburban
- Colours: Navy, light blue, white
- Affiliation: NSW Sport High School Association
- Website: illawaspor-h.schools.nsw.gov.au

Illawarra Sports High School is a government-funded co-educational comprehensive and specialist secondary day school, with speciality in sports, located in Berkeley, a southern suburb of Wollongong, in the Illawarra region of New South Wales, Australia.

Established in 1956 as the Berkeley High School, the school changed its name in 1998 in line with becoming a sports-oriented school. The Illawarra Sports High School caters for approximately 740 students in 2018, from Year 7 to Year 12, of whom 13 percent identified as Indigenous Australians and 27 percent were from a language background other than English. The school draws the majority of its students from the southern Wollongong area; with an increasing number of students from the larger Illawarra area who access its specialist sports programs. The school is operated by the New South Wales Department of Education; the principal is Kerrie Powell.

Illawarra Sports High School is a member of the NSW Sports High Schools Association.

== Sports offered ==
The Illawarra Sports High School operates a talented sports development program across the following sports: basketball, boxing, hockey, netball, rugby league, rugby union, soccer (affiliated with the Sydney FC), surfing, touch football, and wrestling.

== Notable alumni ==
- Junior Amone – former Rugby league player for the St. George Illawarra Dragons
- Jalal Bazzaz – represented Lebanon national rugby league team
- Jack Bird – rugby league player for the Wests Tigers, Brisbane Broncos, St. George Illawarra Dragons and Cronulla-Sutherland Sharks
- Mat Feagai – rugby league player for the St. George Illawarra Dragons
- Max Feagai – rugby league player for the St. George Illawarra Dragons and Dolphins (NRL)
- Caitlin Foord – soccer player, played with the Matildas, Arsenal and Sydney FC
- Tom Freebairn – former Rugby league player for the Wests Tigers
- Tyson Frizell – rugby league footballer; played with the Cronulla-Sutherland Sharks, St. George Illawarra Dragons, Newcastle Knights, Wales, and Australian Schoolboys in rugby union
- Ryan Gregson – middle-distance runner; represented Australia at the 2012 Olympics
- Jackson Hastings – Rugby league player for the Wests Tigers, Newcastle Knights and Sydney Roosters
- Keith Lulia – rugby league footballer; played with the St. George Illawarra Dragons, Newcastle Knights, Bradford Bulls, and Wests Tigers
- Trent Merrin – rugby league footballer; played with the St George Illawarra Dragons and New South Wales State of Origin
- Les Murray AM – former broadcaster, sports journalist and analyst
- Brett Stewart – rugby league footballer; played with the Manly Sea Eagles, New South Wales State of Origin, and Kangaroos
- Glenn Stewart – rugby league footballer; played with the Manly Sea Eagles, New South Wales State of Origin, and Kangaroos
- Jayden Sullivan – rugby league footballer; plays for St George Illawarra Dragons
- Maddison Weatherall – women's rugby league footballer; plays for St George Illawarra Dragons

== See also ==
- List of government schools in New South Wales
- List of schools in Illawarra and the South East
- Selective school (New South Wales)
- Education in Australia
