= Jackson Topine =

New Zealand international rugby league former professional player

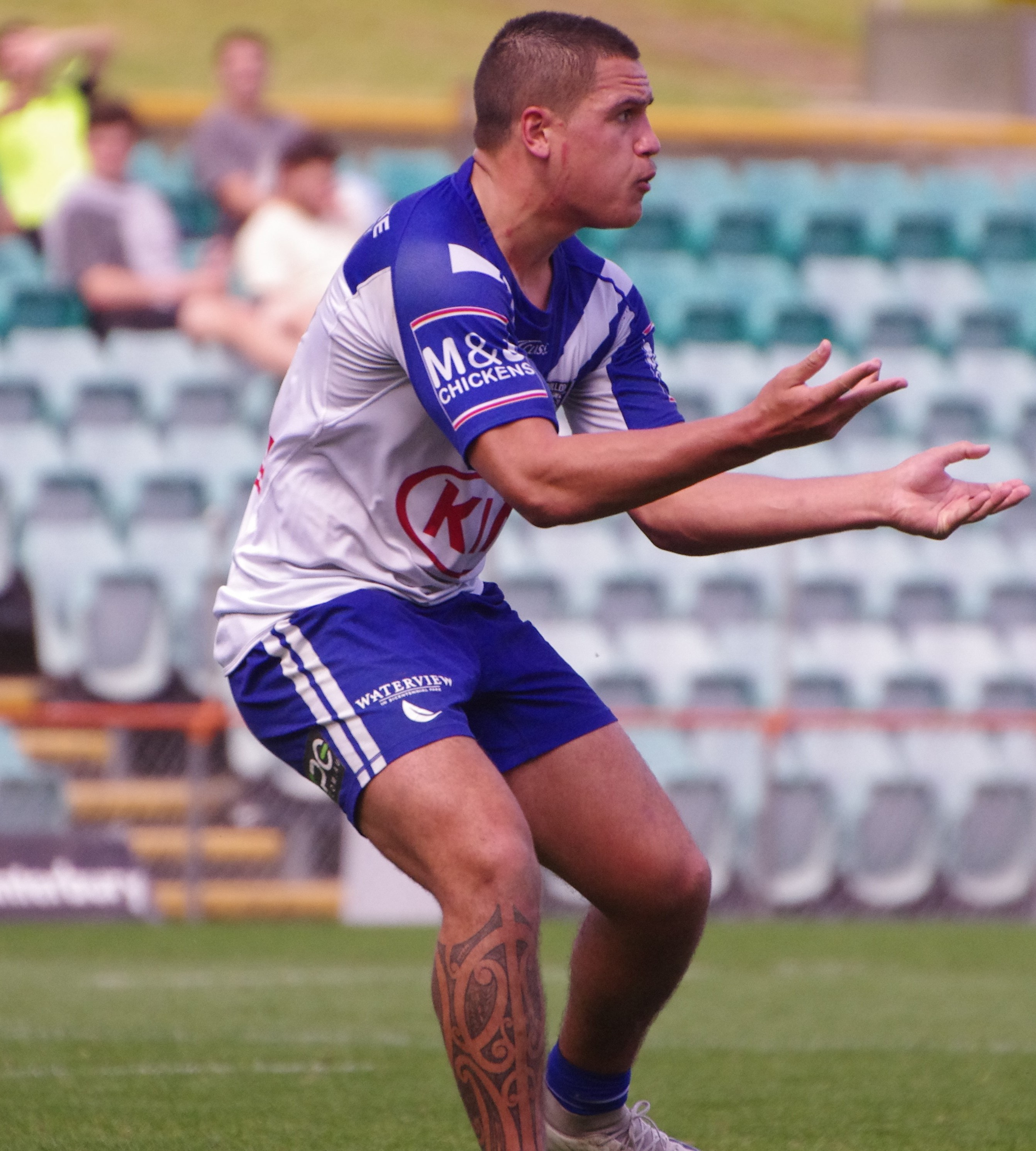

Personal information
- Born: 22 August 2001 (age 25) Auckland, New Zealand
- Height: 181 cm (5 ft 11 in)
- Weight: 95 kg (14 st 13 lb)

Playing information
- Position: Second-row, Hooker
Club
Years	Team	Pld	T	G	FG	P
2021–23	Canterbury Bulldogs	16	1	0	0	4
Representative
Years	Team	Pld	T	G	FG	P
2021	Māori All Stars	1	0	0	0	0
- Source: As of 15 July 2023

Jackson Topine pronounced (/toʊpineɪ/; TOE-pin-ay) (born 22 August 2001) is a New Zealand former professional rugby league footballer who last played as a second-row forward for the Canterbury-Bankstown Bulldogs in the National Rugby League (NRL) and the New Zealand Māori at international level.

== Background ==
Topine was born in Auckland, New Zealand and is of Maori-Cook Island and English descent. He grew up in Perth, Western Australia.

He commenced his junior rugby league for the North Beach Sea Eagles and then the Ellenbrook Rabbitohs in the Perth Rugby League. Topine was then later selected for the West Coast Pirates SG Ball team, while being educated at Ellenbrook Community College.

In 2018, Topine was then moved to the Canterbury Bulldogs and moved to Sydney, Australia and continued to play junior rugby league for St. George Dragons JRLFC. Topine was on scholarship at East Hills Boys High School and was selected in the 2019 Australian Schoolboys.

== Career ==
=== 2021 ===
Topine played for the Māori All Stars in the 2021 All Stars match which ended in a 10–10 draw with the Australian Indigenous All Stars.

Topine made his first grade debut in round 4 of the 2021 NRL season for Canterbury-Bankstown against the South Sydney Rabbitohs at Stadium Australia.

Topine made a total of eight appearances for Canterbury in the 2021 NRL season as the club finished last and claimed the Wooden Spoon.

=== 2022 ===
Topine played three games for Canterbury in the 2022 NRL season. On 25 September, Topine played for Canterbury's NSW Cup team in their grand final loss to Penrith at the Western Sydney Stadium.

=== 2023 ===
Topine was limited to only five matches for Canterbury in the 2023 NRL season as the club finished 15th on the table.

== 2024 legal case against the Bulldogs ==
On 26 April 2024, it was announced that Topine had not returned to Bulldogs training as he had launched legal action against his former team Canterbury after it was alleged he arrived late to training and was forced to endure a wrestling session of the entire teams top 30 squad by the team trainer. Topine in his claims said he was subjected to "unlawful corporal punishment", assault, humiliation, anxiety, fear and deprivation of liberty amongst other claims. Topine said arriving late to training was simply a misunderstanding, as he believed that he had to get strapping done before the morning training session. It was claimed that Topine wanted $4 million as compensation. Topine has since not played in the NRL due to psychological damage.

On 16 July 2025, it was announced that the case would go to court in March 2026. In February 2026, the case had been dismissed and the matter resolved.
