= Figtree High School =

Location
- Figtree, New South Wales; Australia; 34°26′22″S 150°51′16″E

Information
- Type: Government-funded co-educational comprehensive secondary day school
- Motto: Latin: Crescere Fidere Statuere (To Grow. To have faith. To stand firm)
- Established: 1969; 57 years ago
- School district: Regional South
- Educational authority: New South Wales Department of Education
- Principal: Daniel Ovens
- Teaching staff: 74.3 FTE (2018)
- Years: 7–12
- Enrolment: 938 (2018)
- Campus: Suburban
- Colours: Navy blue and white
- Website: figtree-h.schools.nsw.gov.au

Figtree High School is a government-funded co-educational comprehensive secondary day school, located on Gibsons Road in Figtree, a suburb of Wollongong, in the Illawarra region of New South Wales, Australia.

Established in 1969, the school enrolled approximately 900 students in 2018, from Year 7 to Year 12, of whom five percent identified as Indigenous Australians and 26 percent were from a language background other than English. The school is operated by the New South Wales Department of Education.

== History ==
Figtree High School was established in 1969, with 242 First Form students enrolling as the first students to attend. The first principal of the school was Ken Brokenshire, with Robert Everitt, the Deputy Principal and nine assistant teachers. Because construction of the school was not finished at the time, students and teachers borrowed furniture from Dapto High School and attended classes in seven portable buildings in the grounds of Dapto High School. Construction finally finished in July 1969, being announced "Australia's most modern high school" by the local newspaper, and students re-located back to their new building in Gibsons Road. Of the original 242 students enrolled in 1969, 87 elected to enter the Senior School and completed their Higher School Certificate in 1974.

The school was built in close proximity to the famous, historic fig tree that the suburb was named after, and this tree was adopted as the school emblem. But in 1987, after a significant storm, the tree was terminally damaged and was removed as a safety precaution. Students referred to the school as "Figstump High" for this time. After much discussion, a new fig tree was planted on the site of the original tree in 1997.

== Staff ==
The current principal of Figtree High School is Daniel Ovens. There are 52 classroom teachers and a total of approximately 100 staff members including behaviour teachers, physical disability teachers and school assistants.

=== Music, dance and drama ===
Figtree High School has put on a number of musical productions including the 2008 production of "The Course of True Love", written by a teacher at the school and the 2010 production of "Grease: The Musical".

== Notable alumni ==
- Jan Barham – Greens politician; former MLC
- Trent D'Antonio – former baseball professional player
- Brian Hetherington – former rugby league footballer, Blue
- Garry Jack – former rugby league footballer, Blue
- Zac Lomax – rugby league footballer, Kangaroo, Blue

== See also ==
- List of government schools in New South Wales: A–F
- List of schools in Illawarra and the South East
- Education in Australia
