= Jordan Holmes =

Australian soccer player

Personal information
- Full name: Jordan Thomas Holmes
- Date of birth: 8 May 1997 (age 29)
- Place of birth: Sydney, New South Wales, Australia
- Height: 1.90 m (6 ft 3 in)
- Position: Goalkeeper

Team information
- Current team: Western Sydney Wanderers
- Number: 23

Youth career
- Rockdale City
- Sydney United
- 2013–2015: Bournemouth

Senior career*
Years	Team	Apps	(Gls)
2015–2019	Bournemouth	0	(0)
2015–2016	→ Weymouth (loan)	4	(0)
2017	→ Eastbourne Borough (loan)	17	(0)
2019	→ St Mirren (loan)	0	(0)
2019–2021	Ebbsfleet United	35	(0)
2021–2023	Brisbane Roar	37	(0)
2023–2024	Rochedale Rovers	18	(0)
2024–	Western Sydney Wanderers	3	(0)

International career^{‡}
2015–2017	Australia U-20	7	(0)
2019–2021	Australia U-23	5	(0)
Medal record
Men's football
Representing Australia
AFC U-23 Asian Cup
Third place	2020 Thailand	U-23 Team
- * Club domestic league appearances and goals as of 28 April 2026 ‡ National team caps and goals as of 2 August 2021

Jordan Thomas Holmes (/hoʊmz/ HOEMZ; born 8 May 1997) is an Australian footballer who plays as a goalkeeper for Western Sydney Wanderers. Holmes has represented Australia at national level for the U20's, U23's and Australia at the 2020 Tokyo Olympics.

== Early life ==
Born in Sydney, Holmes attended Aquinas College in Menai. In 2012–13 he played for Rockdale City Suns and Sydney United 58 in the New South Wales Youth Premier League. He was also selected and played for the New South Wales Institute of Sport and attended the Australian Institute of Sport (AIS). He represented Cronulla Sutherland, Sydney and New South Wales in Baseball as a pitcher and batsman and specialist shortstop. In 2013, Holmes moved to England to join Bournemouth.

== Club career ==
=== Bournemouth ===
In 2017–18, Holmes continued to be part of the first team squad, playing 18 times for the U23s. Holmes signed a one-year contract extension in May 2018. In January 2019, Holmes joined Scottish Premiership side St Mirren on loan until the end of the season. He was released by Bournemouth at the end of the season.

=== Ebbsfleet United ===
Holmes joined Ebbsfleet United in August 2019, making his debut in a 2–2 against Notts County. A week later, Holmes saved a second half penalty against Aldershot Town. He saved another penalty in a match against Wrexham, although it could not prevent a 1–0 loss.

=== Brisbane Roar ===
In August 2021, it was announced that Holmes would be leaving Ebbsfleet for an opportunity in his home country of Australia with A-League Men team Brisbane Roar. Holmes made 37 league appearances over two seasons with the club and left the club at the conclusion of the 2022-23 season.

=== Rochedale Rovers ===
In July 2023, it was announced that Holmes had signed for NPL Queensland club Rochedale Rovers. Holmes departed the club in August 2024 having made 18 league appearances.

=== Western Sydney Wanderers ===
On 23 August 2024, it was revealed that Holmes had made a return to professional football, having signed a 1–year contract with Western Sydney Wanderers.

== International career ==
Holmes has represented Australia at national level for the U19s and U20s in the Asian Championship and U20's World Cup qualifiers. In May 2015 Holmes was selected to play against Brazil for Australia's U20s at Win Stadium Wollongong. Although Australia were defeated 1–0, Holmes produced a man of the match performance pulling out a string of outstanding saves from Gabriel Jesus (Manchester City) and Andrea Pereira (Manchester United). Holmes is currently vice captain of the U23 Australian Olyroos.

Holmes qualified for the Tokyo 2020 Olympics. He was part of the Olyroos Olympic squad. The team beat Argentina in their first group match but were unable to win another match. They were therefore not in medal contention.

== Honours ==
Australia U-23

- AFC U-23 Asian Cup: 3rd place 2020
