= Tony Cosatto =

Australian rugby league footballer

Personal information
- Full name: Tony Cosatto
- Born: 15 February 1968 (age 58) Sydney, New South Wales, Australia

Playing information
- Position: Wing, Centre, Second-row
Club
Years	Team	Pld	T	G	FG	P
1986–89	Parramatta Eels	20	1	4	0	12
1990–91	Western Suburbs	43	11	0	0	44
1992–93	Eastern Suburbs	18	1	0	1	5
	Total	81	13	4	1	61

Tony Cosatto (/ˈkəsætoʊ/) (born 15 February 1968) is an Australian former professional rugby league footballer who played in the 1980s and 1990s. He played for Parramatta, Western Suburbs, and Eastern Suburbs. He mostly played at wing or centre, but later shifted to second-row.

== Playing career ==
While attending Ashcroft High School in Sydney, Cosatto played for the Australian Schoolboys team in 1985. In round 3 of the 1986 season, Parramatta Eels coach John Monie called up Cosatto, while still in high school, to make his first grade debut on the wing in his side's 16-12 win over the Balmain Tigers at Leichhardt Oval in round 3 of the 1986 season. Whilst the Eels went on to win the premiership in first grade, Cosatto played in the Eels' 1986 Reserve Grade grand final loss to the Eastern Suburbs Roosters. Cosatto's time with the Eels was plagued with injuries, in his four seasons with the Eels, he only managed to make 20 appearances with them. Cosatto's stint with the Eels ended at the conclusion of the 1989 season.

In 1990, Cosatto joined the Western Suburbs Magpies. Cosatto was more of a regular in the first grade team in his stint with Wests. In 1990, he spent most of the season playing centre with fellow 1990 newcomer Jamie Ainscough. Despite a poor season from the Magpies in which they finished in 13th position, Cosatto along fellow newcomers Jamie Ainscough, Jason Taylor, and Russell Wyer were described as "the best of the babies" in the NSWRL for the season.

Cosatto had his best season in 1991, when he played in 23 of his side's 24 games, and finished the season as the team's top try scorer with 8 tries. The 1991 season also saw the arrival of coach Warren Ryan and big-name players Andrew Farrar, David Gillespie, Paul Langmack, Joe Thomas, and Graeme Wynn at the Magpies. Ryan's appointment saw a reversal in the club's fortunes. They went from being easybeats (having not made a finals appearance since 1982) to title contenders. The Magpies made their first finals appearance in nine years after surviving a play-off for fifth spot 19-14 against the Canterbury Bulldogs at Parramatta Stadium. Their joy was short lived however as they were comprehensively defeated 22-8 by defending premiers the Canberra Raiders the following weekend in the qualifying final at the Sydney Football Stadium. Cosatto's stint with the Magpies ended at the conclusion of the 1991 season

In 1992, Cosatto joined the Eastern Suburbs Roosters. His final appearance in first grade came from the bench in his side's 24−10 victory over the Gold Coast Seagulls at Seagulls Stadium in round 22 of the 1993 season. He made 18 appearances at the Roosters before announcing his retirement at the conclusion of the 1993 season. In total, Cosatto played 81 games, scored 13 tries, and kicked 4 goals and 1 field goal.
