= Bass High School =

Location
- Bass Hill, New South Wales; Australia; 33°53′52″S 150°59′26″E

Information
- Type: Public coeducational high school
- Motto: Latin: Tibi Confidas
- Established: 1959; 67 years ago
- Principal: Martin Toaetolu
- Years: 7–12
- Campus type: Suburban
- Colours: Green, black and white
- Website: Bass High School

Bass High School is a comprehensive, co-educational government high school in Bass Hill, a south-western suburb of Sydney, New South Wales, Australia.

== Land history ==
The school was established in 1959 and accepts students from feeder primary schools in Villawood, Bass Hill and Georges Hall. Bass High School (usually abbreviated to "Bass High") caters for students in years 7 to 12.

It is named after George Bass, the explorer. The school is in the Bankstown District of the New South Wales Department of Education and Training.

== Notable faculty ==
- Jimmy Lisle – former dual code rugby international

== Notable alumni ==
- Kane Bradley – rugby league footballer
- Dale Finucane – rugby league footballer
- Royce Hunt – rugby league footballer
- Youngn Lipz – rapper
- Brenden Santi – rugby league footballer
- Jonathan Sua – rugby league footballer

== See also ==
- List of government schools in New South Wales
- Education in Australia
