= Brian Hetherington =

Australian rugby league footballer (b.1954)

Personal information
- Full name: Brian Hetherington
- Born: 14 January 1954 (age 71) Wollongong, New South Wales, Australia

Playing information
- Height: 185 cm (6 ft 1 in)
- Weight: 85 kg (13 st 5 lb)
- Position: Centre
Club
Years	Team	Pld	T	G	FG	P
1978–81	Newtown Jets	86	14	0	0	42
1982–88	Illawarra Steelers	142	25	0	0	98
1989–90	Halifax RLFC		3	0	0	12
	Total	228	42	0	0	152
Representative
Years	Team	Pld	T	G	FG	P
1977–84	NSW Country Firsts	2
1984–86	New South Wales	2	0	0	0	0
1986	NSW City Firsts	1

Brian Hetherington (born 14 January 1954) is an Australian former professional rugby league footballer who played in the 1970s and 1980s. He played in the New South Wales Rugby League (NSWRL) competition. He primarily played in the centres. Hetherington played for the Newtown Jets and the Illawarra Steelers.

While attending Figtree High School, Hetherington played for the Australian Schoolboys team in 1972.

Hetherington was selected to represent New South Wales in game I of the 1984 State of Origin series and game II of the 1986 series.

== Playing career ==
=== Regal Trophy Final appearances ===
Brian Hetherington played left-centre in Halifax's 12–24 defeat by Wigan in the 1989–90 Regal Trophy Final during the 1989–90 season at Headingley, Leeds on Saturday 13 January 1990.

=== Club career ===
1972 Australian Schoolboy representative had a long career as a centre in Dapto, representing Country and Illawarra against Great Britain in 1977 before joining Newtown Jets in the late 1970s. Hetherington played in the club's 1981 Grand Final loss to Parramatta Eels (scoring a try) but joined the newly formed Illawarra Steelers the following year. In 1984 he became the club's first State of Origin player when he was chosen as a reserve and was named Illawarra Steelers player of the year in that season. Hetherington played in one further match for New South Wales, in 1986, before his retirement at the end of the 1988 season.
