= David Atkins (rugby league) =

Australian rugby league footballer

Personal information
- Full name: David Atkins
- Born: 8 July 1978 (age 46)

Playing information
- Position: Second-row
Club
Years	Team	Pld	T	G	FG	P
1997–00	Canberra	30	1	0	0	4
2001–02	Huddersfield	31	4	0	0	16
	Total	61	5	0	0	20
- Source: As of 27 January 2023

David Atkins is an Australian former professional rugby league footballer who played in the 1990s and 2000s. He played for Canberra in the NRL and for Huddersfield in the Super League.

== Playing career ==
Atkins made his first grade debut for Canberra in round 9 of the 1997 Super League season against the Perth Reds at Bruce Stadium. Atkins was later recalled into the Canberra team for the 1997 finals series and played in two finals matches against Penrith and Cronulla. In the 1998 NRL season, Atkins played eight games for Canberra including their elimination final victory over Manly. Atkins last game for Canberra came in the 2000 NRL season where the club lost 38–10 against the Sydney Roosters in that years elimination final. In 2001, Atkins joined English side Huddersfield where he played a total of 31 matches over two seasons.
