= Jared Haywood =

Australian rugby league footballer (born 2006)

Personal information
- Born: 28 December 2006 (age 19) Penrith, New South Wales, Australia

Playing information
- Position: Hooker
Club
Years	Team	Pld	T	G	FG	P
2026–	Wests Tigers	3	0	0	0	0
- Source: RLP

Jared Haywood (born 28 December 2006) is an Australian rugby league footballer for the Wests Tigers in the National Rugby League (NRL).

== Early life ==
Born in Penrith, Haywood was educated at Patrician Brothers' College, Blacktown, and played as a five-eighth in their 2024 premiership-winning team, although he is primarily a hooker. He was a member of the 2024 Australian Schoolboys representative team.

== Career ==
Haywood, a St Marys junior, is a product of the Wests Tigers' pathways and during his time in the SG Ball Cup was captain of the Balmain Tigers.

In 2026, Haywood made nine appearances for the Western Suburbs Magpies in the NSW Cup and earned a first-grade debut late in the NRL season, coming on off the bench against the Warriors in round 19. The following round, Haywood got his first start as hooker against Canterbury-Bankstown. He is contracted by the Wests Tigers through to the end of the 2028 season.
