= Erina High School =

Location
- Erina, Central Coast, New South Wales; Australia; 33°26′24″S 151°22′48″E

Information
- Type: Government-funded co-educational comprehensive secondary day school
- Motto: Service Crowns Success
- Established: 1964; 62 years ago
- School district: Brisbane Water; Regional North
- Educational authority: New South Wales Department of Education
- Principal: Paul Broadbent
- Teaching staff: 52.4 FTE (2018)
- Enrolment: 720 (2018)
- Campus type: Suburban
- Colours: Green and yellow
- Website: erina-h.schools.nsw.gov.au

Erina High School is a government-funded co-educational comprehensive secondary day school, located in Erina, a suburb on the Central Coast of New South Wales, Australia.

Established in 1964, the school enrolled approximately 720 students in 2018, from Year 7 to Year 12, of whom eight percent identified as Indigenous Australians and eight percent were from a language background other than English. The school is operated by the New South Wales Department of Education.

== Notable alumni ==
- Matt Orford – former professional rugby league footballer
- Dan Sarooshi QC – a London-based barrister (Queen's Counsel) and Oxford professor of international law
- Jamie Mullarkey – lightweight mixed martial artist who competes for the Ultimate Fighting Championship.

== See also ==
- List of government schools in New South Wales (D-F)
- Education in Australia
