= Paul Quinn (rugby league, born 1972) =

Australian rugby league footballer

Personal information
- Born: 18 April 1972 (age 52)

Playing information
- Position: Lock, Second-row
Club
Years	Team	Pld	T	G	FG	P
1991–92	Parramatta	11	0	0	0	0
1993	Penrith	6	0	0	0	0
1994–97	South Sydney	46	4	0	0	16
	Total	63	4	0	0	16

Paul Quinn (born 18 April 1972) is an Australian former professional rugby league footballer who played for Parramatta, Penrith and South Sydney in the 1990s.

A St Gregory's College product, Quinn earned Australian schoolboys representative selection in 1990 and was signed by Parramatta in what was reported to be one of the most lucrative contracts ever offered to a schoolboy player.

Quinn, a back rower, was unable to establish himself in Parramatta's first-grade team, with most of his appearances coming off the bench, and crossed to Penrith for the 1993 NSWRL season.

In 1994 he joined South Sydney and was a member of the team which upset the Brisbane Broncos to win the Challenge Cup in the 1994 pre season. His 1994 season was ultimately cruelled by a knee injury, but he made regular appearances in 1995 as a second rower and again in 1996, mostly at lock.
