= Sandy Campbell (rugby league) =

Australian rugby league footballer

Personal information
- Full name: Sandy Campbell
- Born: 11 November 1966 (age 59) Toowoomba, Queensland, Australia

Playing information
- Position: Wing, Centre
Club
Years	Team	Pld	T	G	FG	P
1986–88	Canterbury-Bankstown	50	11	0	0	44
1989–90	Eastern Suburbs	24	3	0	0	12
1991	South Sydney	19	3	0	0	12
	Total	93	17	0	0	68

Sandy Campbell (born 11 November 1966) is an Australian former rugby league footballer who played in the 1980s and 1990s. He played for South Sydney, Canterbury-Bankstown and Eastern Suburbs in the New South Wales Rugby League (NSWRL) competition.

== Background ==
Campbell represented the Australian schoolboys before being graded by Canterbury-Bankstown in 1985.

== Playing career ==
Campbell made his first grade debut for Canterbury in round 2 1986 against Cronulla-Sutherland at Belmore Oval. In his debut year Campbell played in two of the club's finals matches, the 16-2 victory over South Sydney and the 16-0 semi final loss against the Parramatta Eels. Campbell was not selected to play in the 1986 grand final against Parramatta which Canterbury lost 4-2 at the Sydney Cricket Ground.

Over the next two seasons, Campbell spent time in the first grade side and with the reserve grade. In his final year at the club in 1988, he missed out on selection in Canterbury's grand final team which defeated Balmain in the decider. Campbell played 88 games for Canterbury across all grades.

In 1989, Campbell joined Eastern Suburbs and spent two years with them as they missed out on the finals series. Campbell then joined Easts arch rivals South Sydney in 1991. Campbell spent one year with Souths and made 19 appearances before being released.

== Personal life ==
In 2022, Campbell was reported to be battling throat cancer and living homeless on the beach at Coolangatta.
