= Trent Estatheo =

Australian rugby league footballer

Personal information
- Full name: Trent Estatheo
- Born: 10 May 1981 (age 44) Maitland, New South Wales, Australia

Playing information
Club
| Years | Team | Pld | T | G | FG | P |
|---|---|---|---|---|---|---|
| 2002 | Newcastle Knights | 3 | 0 | 0 | 0 | 0 |
- As of 15 Jul 2021

Trent Estatheo (born 10 May 1981 in Maitland, New South Wales) is an Australian former professional rugby league footballer who played in the 2000s. He played for the Newcastle Knights in 2002.
