= Jamie Russo =

Australian rugby league footballer

Personal information
- Full name: Jamie Russo
- Born: 16 April 1981 (age 45) Auburn, New South Wales, Australia

Playing information
- Position: Five-eighth, Halfback, Lock
Club
Years	Team	Pld	T	G	FG	P
2001	Sydney Roosters	4	0	0	0	0
2002	Parramatta Eels	2	0	0	0	0
2003–04	South Sydney	19	2	0	0	8
2009	Gateshead Thunder	1	0	0	0	0
2009	Oldham RLFC	5	3	0	0	12
	Total	31	5	0	0	20

Jamie Russo (born 16 April 1981) is an Australian former professional rugby league footballer of the 2000s. Russo had stints with the Sydney Roosters, Parramatta Eels, South Sydney Rabbitohs, Gateshead Thunder and Oldham RLFC (Heritage No.1250). He was primarily a Five-eighth.

== Background ==
Russo was born in Auburn, Sydney and raised on the Sunshine Coast in Queensland, Australia.

== Playing career ==
Russo made his first-grade debut for Eastern Suburbs in Round 10 of 2001 season against Melbourne which ended in a 23–22 victory for Easts. In 2002, Russo joined Parramatta and made two appearances for the club before being released. In 2003, Russo joined South Sydney and played there for two seasons before being released. In both years that Russo was at the club, Souths finished last on the table.

In 2005, Russo moved back to Queensland and signed with the Redcliffe Dolphins. Also in 2005, Russo was selected to play for the Queensland residents team to play against the NSW residents side. In 2006, Russo was set to join the Canberra Raiders, but the deal fell through due to salary cap restraints at the club. In 2009, Russo joined Gateshead in England dominating the English game and going on to signing a lucrative deal at the Oldham Roughyeds.
