= Craig Makepeace =

Australian rugby league footballer

Personal information
- Full name: Craig Makepeace

Playing information
- Position: Wing
Club
Years	Team	Pld	T	G	FG	P
1992–95	North Sydney Bears	22	8	17	0	66

Craig Makepeace is an Australian former professional rugby league footballer who played for the North Sydney Bears as a wing.

== Playing career ==
Makepeace made his debut for North Sydney in round 14 of the 1992 season against the Gold Coast Seagulls kicking three goals in a 19–6 victory.

In 1993, Makepeace had his most successful season managing to secure a spot on the wing. In round 13 1993, Makepeace scored a try and kicked the winning goal as Norths came from 17-0 down against Canterbury to win 18–17. Makepeace only managed to feature in three games over the next two seasons and was released by Norths at the end of 1995.

== Post playing ==
In retirement, Makepeace has become a successful travel blogger and has over 4.2 million followers on Instagram. He now resides in Raleigh, North Carolina.
