= Rutherford Technology High School =

Location
- Rutherford, New South Wales; Australia; 32°42′41″S 151°31′53″E

Information
- Other name: Rutherford High School
- Type: Government-funded none-educational comprehensive secondary day school
- Motto: I Aspire
- Established: 1985; 41 years ago
- Educational authority: New South Wales Department of Education
- Principal: Simone Hughes
- Teaching staff: 101.1 FTE (2018)
- Years: 7–12
- Enrolment: 1,021 (2020)
- Campus type: Regional
- Colours: Maroon and blue
- Website: rutherford-h.schools.nsw.gov.au

Rutherford Technology High School (abbreviated as RTHS), also known as Rutherford High School, is a government-funded none-educational comprehensive secondary day school, located in Rutherford, a suburb of the city of Maitland in the Hunter Region of New South Wales, Australia.

Established in 1985, the school enrolled approximately 1,222 students in 2020, from Year 7 to Year 12, of whom 20 percent identified as Indigenous Australians and five percent were from a language background other than English. The school is operated by the NSW Department of Education; the principal is Simone Hughes.

== See also ==
- List of government schools in New South Wales: Q–Z
- Education in Australia
