= Aquinas Catholic College, Menai =

Location
- Anzac Road; Menai, New South Wales, 2234; Australia; 34°1′9″S 151°1′16″E

Information
- Type: Private, systemic high school
- Motto: Enlivened by the Spirit
- Religious affiliation: Roman Catholic
- Established: 1993
- Oversight: Roman Catholic Archdiocese of Sydney
- Principal: James Clancy
- Teaching staff: 79
- Years offered: 7–12
- Gender: Co-educational
- Enrolment: 1,094 (2018)
- Houses: MacKillop; LaSalle; Nagle; Rice
- Website: aquinasmenai.syd.catholic.edu.au

Aquinas Catholic College, Menai is a private, Roman Catholic, co-educational, systemic high school in Menai, New South Wales, Australia. It was established in 1993 and is located in the Roman Catholic Archdiocese of Sydney.

== Extracurricular activities ==
The school offers a range of extracurricular activities including cricket, Australian rules football, rugby league, oz-tag, rugby union, football, debating, public speaking, music, drama, athletics, swimming, basketball, netball, cross country running, waterpolo, chess and volleyball.

=== House system ===
The school has a house system of four houses which are named after a Catholic historical figure and represented by a colour. Students are allocated to a house then placed into a vertically streamed pastoral class which is led by two elected year twelve senior house leaders. They compete for the House Cup in a variety of events.

The houses are:

- MacKillop — named after Mary MacKillop and represented by the colour blue
- LaSalle — named after Jean-Baptiste de La Salle and represented by the colour green
- Nagle — named after Nano Nagle and represented by the colour gold
- Rice — named after Edmund Ignatius Rice and represented by the colour red

== Notable alumni ==
- Blayke Brailey, rugby league footballer
- Jayden Brailey, rugby league footballer
- Kyle Flanagan, rugby league footballer
- Jordan Holmes, professional footballer
- James Roumanos, rugby league footballer

== See also ==
- List of Catholic schools in New South Wales
- Catholic education in Australia
