= Cambridge Park High School =

- Cambridge Park High School logo

Location
- Cambridge Park, New South Wales; Australia
- Coordinates: 33°45′9″S 150°43′58″E

Information
- School type: Public
- Motto: Together we Achieve
- Principal: Nic Webb
- Teaching staff: ~70
- Grades: 7-12
- Enrolment: ~700
- Campus type: Suburban
- Website: https://cambridge-h.schools.nsw.gov.au/

Cambridge Park High School is located in Western Sydney, at the base of the Blue Mountains. The school offers a comprehensive education to the approximately 600 students enrolled, who come primarily from the surrounding suburbs of Kingswood, Werrington, Werrington County, Cambridge Park and Cambridge Gardens.

This school is equipped with learning facilities, such as commercial-grade kitchens, fitness lab, three-story library and newly-renovated science labs. Cambridge Park High School also has three elevators for students with disabilities and/or additional needs.

== Subjects and electives ==
Year 7 students at Cambridge Park will learn French as part of their compulsory language class. Year 7 and 8 will be involved in TAS subjects, known as "Mandatory Technology," generally consisting of food technology, metalwork, woodwork, coding, and engineering. Year 7 and 8 students also learn music and art in the respective years.

The school offers a variety of elective courses, with students being able to select their desired courses from Year 9 onward.

== Alumni ==
- Tony Jones, Sports Journalist
- Jamie Olejnik, Rugby league player
- Matt Austin (Duck Man), sports journalist, commentator
- Shayne Mallard, politician and public servant
