= Brisbane Water Secondary College =

Location
- Central Coast, New South Wales; Australia: 33°30′25″S 151°18′34″E (Umina Campus); 33°29′34″S 151°19′29″E (Woy Woy Campus)

Information
- Former names: Umina High School; Woy Woy High School
- Type: Government-funded co-educational comprehensive secondary day school
- Motto: Strength Through Unity
- Established: 2001; 25 years ago
- Educational authority: New South Wales Department of Education
- Principal: Paul Gilmore
- Years: 7–12
- Enrolment: ~1,500 (2018)
- Campuses: Umina: Middle school; Woy Woy: Senior campus
- Campus type: Suburban
- Colours: Blue, white and yellow
- Website: umina-h.schools.nsw.gov.au; woywoy-h.schools.nsw.gov.au

Brisbane Water Secondary College is a dual-campus government-funded co-educational comprehensive secondary day school, located on the Central Coast of New South Wales, Australia. The college's Middle School campus is located in Umina Beach, catering for students from Year 7 to Year 9; and the college's Senior Campus is located in Woy Woy, catering from students from Year 10 to Year 12.

== History ==
Brisbane Water Secondary College is a public high school that was created in 2002 by the merging of Umina High School and Woy Woy High School. Both former high schools now constitute the two campuses of the Secondary College. The Umina Campus, located along Veron Road, Umina Beach, caters for Middle School students from Years 7 to 9 and the Woy Woy Campus, located along Edward Street, Woy Woy, caters for Senior School students from Years 10 to 12.

== Facilities ==
From 2011 the Umina Campus has established a dedicated selective Creative and Performing Arts class for years 7 and 8 as part of an ongoing rejuvenation of its CAPA program. The college has continued to enjoy triumphs in the Arts, and is frequently involved in such Arts programs as Central Vision, Schools Spectacular, Starstruck and the Kool Skools recording project, which the campus has won a record four times since its inception.

== See also ==
- List of government schools in New South Wales
- Education in Australia
