= St Patrick's College, Sutherland =

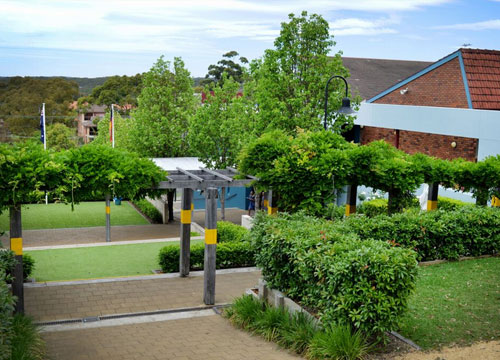
- Image of the Grounds at St. Patrick's College, Sutherland

Location
- 551 President Avenue, Sutherland, Southern Sydney, New South Wales; Australia; 34°02′00″S 151°03′40″E

Information
- Type: Independent co-educational secondary day school
- Motto: Seek Wisdom in Christ
- Religious affiliation: Christian Brothers [[the Sisters of the Presentation of the Blessed Virgin Mary]
- Denomination: Roman Catholicism
- Patron saint: Saint Patrick
- Established: 1956; 70 years ago (as Christian Brothers College); 1959; 67 years ago (as Mary Immaculate College)
- Founder: Congregation of Christian Brothers (CBC); Presentation Sisters (MIC)
- Educational authority: New South Wales Department of Education
- Principal: James Corcoran
- Years: 7–12
- Colours: Blue, white, and maroon
- Feeder schools: St Patrick's Primary School
- Website: www.stpatscoll.nsw.edu.au

St Patrick's College is an independent Roman Catholic co-educational secondary day school, located in Sutherland, Southern Sydney, New South Wales, Australia. The college provides a general and religious education for students from Year 7 to Year 12.

The school traces its founding to Christian Brothers College, established as an upper primary school in 1956 by the Congregation of Christian Brothers. In 1992, it merged with Mary Immaculate College, which had been founded in 1959 by the Presentation Sisters of Wagga Wagga. The school takes its name from St. Patrick's School, a primary parochial school, which had been founded in 1924 by the Sisters of Mercy of Cronulla, and of which Mary Immaculate College had been established as a secondary department.

St Patrick's College is connected to St Patrick's Catholic Parish Sutherland and St Patrick's Primary School.

== School hymn ==
The school hymn is sung to the tune of Gustav Theodore Holst's "Jupiter" theme from The Planets (also known as "I Vow to Thee, My Country").

== Extracurricular activities ==
This includes sporting events, band, debating, public speaking, the Duke of Edinburgh Award, Social Justice and Youth Ministry.

=== College sports ===
Many students participate in internal, grade and representative sport. Various internal and grade sport includes soccer, basketball, softball, AFL, water polo, cricket, surfing, tennis, swimming, life saving, rugby, hockey, oztag, golf and many more. Representative sport is a major part of college culture with the college competing in various prestigious sporting competitions such as the SCCC (Shire Combined Catholic Colleges), SSCCC (Southern Sydney Combined Catholic Colleges) and the NSWCCC (NSW Combined Catholic Colleges). Sports such as football, AFL, rugby league, rugby union, touch, hockey, waterpolo, netball, soccer, tennis, softball, baseball, basketball and cricket are representative sports the college competes in on a yearly basis.

=== College bands ===
The St. Patrick's College bands include the Marching Band, Junior and Senior Band, Stage Band, Guitar Ensemble and Drum Squad.

=== Debating and public speaking ===
The college encourages students to participate in Debating and Public Speaking. Junior and Senior teams participate regularly in the Catholic Schools Debating competition which provides students with the challenge of competing against students from a number of other Catholic Colleges.

In addition, teams have been involved in a Shire Debating competition organised by the Sutherland Rotary Club and a History Debating competition organised by the NSW Department of Education.

=== Duke of Edinburgh Award ===
The Duke of Edinburgh's Award program involves three progressive levels which, when successfully completed, lead to a Bronze, Silver or Gold Duke of Edinburgh's Award. There are four sections at Bronze and Silver level and five at Gold. With assistance from adult Leaders, participants select and set objectives in each of the following areas: Volunteering, Physical, Skills, Expedition and, at Gold level, Residential. Each section must be done for a minimum period of time. It must be monitored and then assessed by someone with knowledge of that particular activity to achieve an Award.

The Duke of Edinburgh's Award it has become a significant program to develop the skills of college students. Currently the college has of the largest programs on offer in NSW with an increasing demand for places each year. Students of the college may apply to commence the program in Year 9, with the opportunity to continue through to Year 12.

=== 2021 NSWCCC Tennis Team ===
In 2021, St. Patrick's College Sutherland put in their first ever team into the Combined Catholic Colleges Team Tennis Event. The Team consisted of Orlando Manciameli, Adam Glowacki, Cyrus Wong and Callum Stanger. They finished 3rd and lost in the semifinals coming short of the eventual champions St. Augustine's College. Wong became the youngest player to participate in the event at 11 years and 321 days. The previous youngest player was Adam McDermott at 12 years and 14 days. Additionally Wong qualified for the 2023 NSWCCC Tennis Team. He became the first tennis player from St. Patrick's College ever to do so since the induction of the school into the CCC system.

== Gallery ==
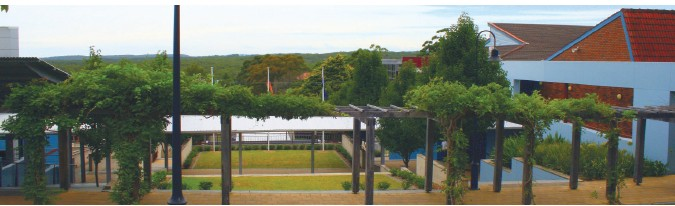
St. Patrick's College Campus

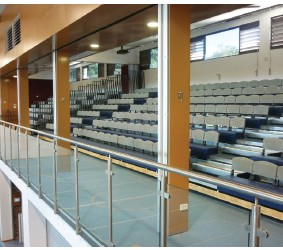
St. Patricks College hall foyer

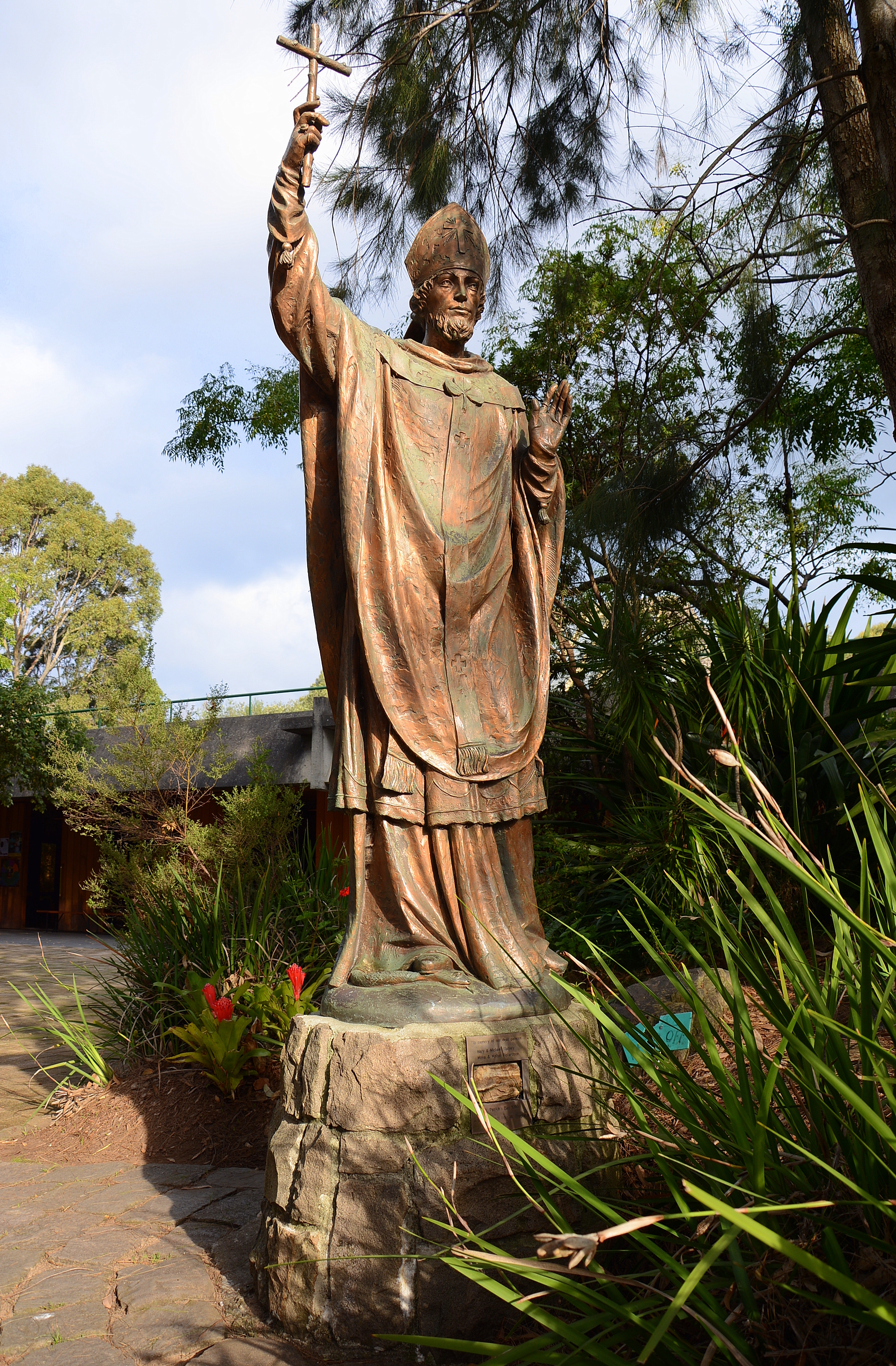
St. Patrick's Church Sutherland

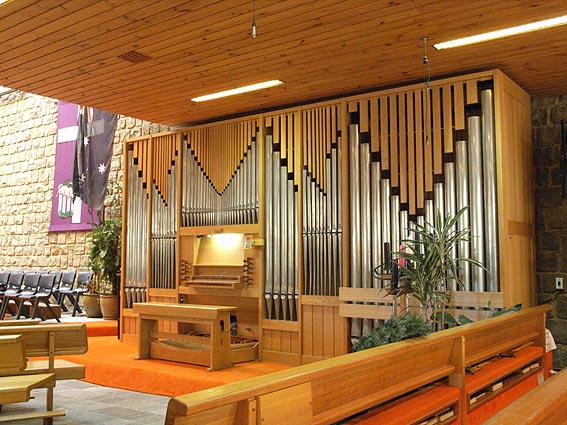
St. Patrick's Church Sutherland

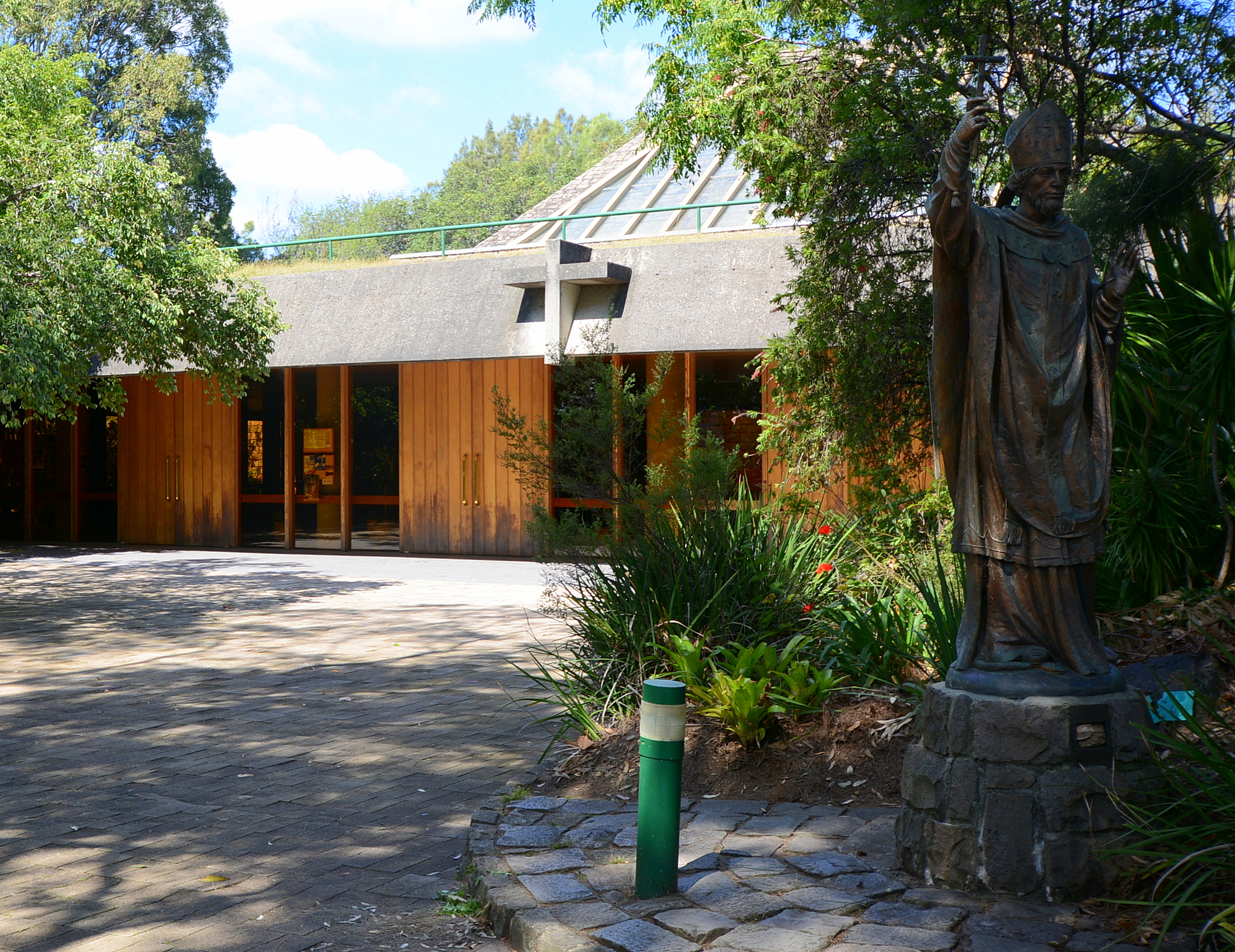
St. Patrick's Church Sutherland

== Notable alumni ==
- Chris Downy, NSW state politician – NSW Minister for Sport, Recreation and Racing 1993–1995, Liberal MP for Sutherland 1988–1997
- Alex Gersbach, professional footballer
- Kimberlee Green, netballer
- Michael Egan, NSW state politician, NSW Treasurer 1995–2005
- Ruby Fields, singer-songwriter and guitarist
- Maryanne Stuart, NSW State Politician, Labour MP for Heathcote 2023–present

== See also ==
- List of Catholic schools in New South Wales
- Catholic education in Australia
