= St. Philip's Christian College =

- High Street entrance, Waratah Campus

Location
- Central Coast and Hunter Region of New South Wales; Australia; 32°54′15″S 151°43′23″E

Information
- Type: Independent co-educational early learning, primary and secondary specialist and comprehensive day school
- Motto: The Way, The Truth, and The Life
- Denomination: Non-denominational Christian
- Patron saint: Saint Philip the Evangelist
- Established: 1982; 44 years ago
- Educational authority: NSW Department of Education
- Specialists: Assisted learning; Autism spectrum disorder; Young parents
- Principal: Jamie Fahey
- Executive Principal: Graham Irwin
- Staff: 150+
- Years: Early learning and K–12
- Campuses: Cessnock (Early learning; K–12); Gosford (Early learning; K–12); Port Stephens (Early learning; K–12); Newcastle (Early learning; K–12); Waratah (Dynamic Alternative Learning Environment; Young Parents); Wyong (Young Parents)
- Houses: Macquarie; Hunter; Paterson; Williams
- Website: www.spcc.nsw.edu.au

St Philip's Christian College is a multi-campus independent non-denominational Christian co-educational early learning, primary and secondary day school, located in the Central Coast and Hunter regions of New South Wales, Australia.

There are 4,000 students across all campuses that are located in Cessnock, Gosford, Newcastle, Port Stephens, plus a campus in Waratah which houses the DALE (Dynamic Alternative Learning Environment) program for students with an autism spectrum disorder, or who struggle with their schooling (students are also able to access this program at the Waratah, Cessnock and Gosford campuses). A Young Parents program is delivered from campuses in Waratah and Wyong.

== History ==
The school was founded in 1982 by St Philip's Anglican Church Waratah. In 1984, the school purchased the Wesley Haven nursing home in High Street, Waratah.

St Philip's (Waratah campus) has a 500-seat theatre on site and purchased the old St Philip's Anglican church site. This site has been refurbished to be the Centre of Sports Education.

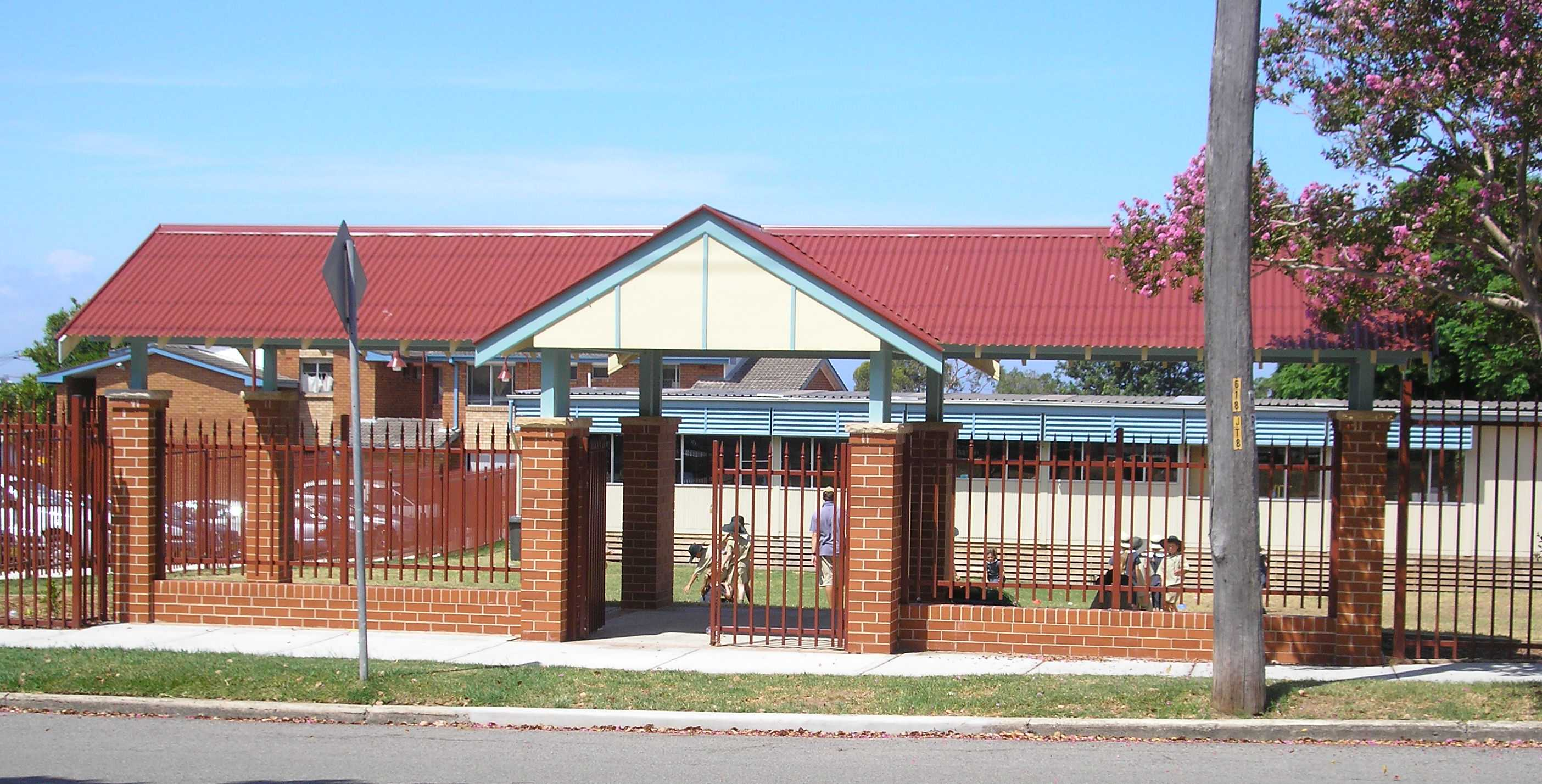
Bridge Street entrance, Waratah Campus

St Philip's Christian College Port Stephens was established in 1995. In 1997, an alternative school for students at risk or autism spectrum disorder (Years 7–10) named DALE (Dynamic Alternate Learning Environment) was established.

In October 1997 the college acquired Narnia Preschool. There are now six Narnia Christian Preschool and Early Childhood centres, most catering for children from 0 to 5 years.

In 1997 DALE (Dynamic Alternative Learning Environment) School began with the Young Mothers Program being established in 2000.

In 2001, the Waratah campus was restructured into a Junior School (K-4), Middle School (5–8) and Senior School (9–12).

In 2005, the college acquired Cessnock Christian School which was renamed to St Philip's Christian College Cessnock. The Cessnock school is situated on a 100-acre site at Nulkaba near the Earnest Hill Vineyards.

In 2007 Gosford Christian College on the Central Coast suburb of Narara was acquired. Renamed St Philip's Christian College Gosford as the fifth St Philip's School.

St Philip's Christian College students regularly participate in competitions such as The Da Vinci Decathlon, the NSW Combined Independent School Sports events and the APSMO Mathematics Games. Students also participate in community service projects. Students have annual camps which generally focus on outdoor education and team building exercises.

The 2017 Newcastle St Philip's Christian College staging of the musical Mary Poppins, collected five CONDA awards, among them Best Musical Production, Director (Musical), and Best Ensemble Acting. The show, staged in Newcastle Civic Theatre, was praised by the judges as "boundlessly colourful and exceptionally realised", with "spirited performances" and "impressive production details".

The St Philip's group of schools is governed by St Philip's Christian Education Foundation in Newcastle, NSW, Australia.

== See also ==
- List of non-government schools in New South Wales
