= East Hills Girls High School =

Coordinates: 33.95674°S 150.99189°E

East Hills Girls Technology High School
- Educating Girls for a Technological Future

Location
- Lucas Road; Lucas Road, Panania, NSW, 2212; Panania; New South Wales; Australia

Information
- Type: Girls Technology Secondary School
- Motto: Honor Ante Honores
- Established: 1953
- School district: East Hills
- Principal: Ms Lucy Andre
- Staff: 76
- Grades: 7–12
- Enrollment: Approximately 750 students
- Colours: Bottle green, grey and white
- Website: easthillsg-h.schools.nsw.gov.au

East Hills Girls Technology High School is a public comprehensive secondary school for girls in Panania, a suburb in South West Sydney.
