= Granville Boys High School =

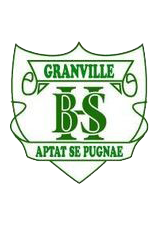

Location
- Mary Street, Granville, New South Wales; Australia; 33°50′03″S 151°0′34″E

Information
- Type: Government-funded partially selective comprehensive secondary day school
- Motto: Aptat Se Pugnae (Prepare for the challenge)
- Established: December 1926
- School district: Parramatta; Metropolitan West
- Educational authority: New South Wales Department of Education
- Principal: Noel Dixon
- Teaching staff: 51.1 FTE (2019)
- Grades: year 7–12
- Enrolment: 509 (2019)
- Colours: Green and white
- Website: granvilleb-h.schools.nsw.gov.au

Granville Boys High School is a government-funded single-sex secondary day school, located at Granville a suburb in western Sydney, in the state of New South Wales, Australia.

Granville Boys High School (abbreviated as GBHS) is an academically selective and comprehensive senior secondary day school for 530 boys, 99% of whom are from non-English speaking backgrounds.

== History ==
The school site before 1923 was owned by the Bergan family, who owned the local Woollen Mill. The only building on the block bounded by Mary, Lumley, Maud and Hutchinson streets was the weatherboard family house of James and John Bergan and their three sisters. The block at the time was fenced partly by a three-rail and partly by a picket fence. Shrubs and bamboos grew at the back of the house and along the fence bordering on Maud Street. Many huge trees were also on the property, and these were where surrounding buildings were erected.

In spite of opposition from the Granville War Memorial committee, who wanted the site for a hospital, the block was resumed in 1923 for the purpose of building a Junior Technical School. In October 1924, a tender for its construction was accepted. The foundation stone was laid by the then Minister for Education, Mr. Albert Bruntnell, before an interested gathering on 7 February 1925.

Granville Boys High School was officially open on 10 October 1925 as Granville Central Technical High School. Subjects taught were English, Mathematics, Geometry, Prose, Science and Technical Drawing. The first school buildings came into use in September, as an adjunct to Auburn public school, which at that time took pupils to second form. The first Principal, Mr. William Steinbeck, was appointed as Headmaster in December 1925, and commenced duty at the beginning of the school year in 1926.

During the 1950s, new buildings were constructed and the school was renamed Granville Secondary Technical College. The curriculum extended to include Music, Printing, Model Aircraft Flying and Choir. 70 students were also able to attend pre-apprenticeship classes in Electrical, Fitting and Machining, Automotive and Carpentry.

By 1966 the school had undergone many changes and had officially been renamed Granville Boys High school. Throughout the 1970s and 1980s many new programs and classes were introduced. The school became part of the Disadvantaged Schools Program. Sports and Leisure programs were introduced along with Drama and Computing Studies.

The school motto, shown on the school's crest is "Aptat Se Pugnae". This is a Latin phrase and means "prepare for the challenge". Granville Boys High School strives to prepare all of its students for life's challenges.

Granville Boys High School enrolments have grown from 490 to 710 in the past five years. It offers programs such as robotics, barbershop, and bagpipe band.

== Scholarship and awards ==
Granville Boys High School students can take advantage of several scholarship and award opportunities including.

- NSW School Nanga Mai Awards
- Premier's Spelling Bee
- Premier's Reading Challenge
- Premier's Debating Challenge
- Public speaking competitions
- Premier's Anzac Memorial Scholarships
- Duke of Edinburgh

== Notable alumni ==
- Frank Clark – Olympic race walker
- Talal Yassine – Entrepreneur, lawyer, and philanthropist
- Tarek Elrich – Australian soccer player
- Alfie Mafi – Australian professional rugby union football player

== See also ==
- List of government schools in New South Wales: A–F
- Education in Australia
