= Kiama High School =

Location
- Kiama, New South Wales; Australia; 34°40′53″S 150°50′46″E

Information
- Type: Government-funded co-educational comprehensive secondary day school
- Motto: Latin: Ad Altiora (Towards higher things)
- Established: 1954; 72 years ago
- Educational authority: New South Wales Department of Education
- Principal: Catherine Glover
- Teaching staff: 74.5 FTE (2018)
- Years: 7–12
- Enrolment: 1,041 (2018)
- Campus type: Regional
- Colours: Blue, white and gold
- Website: kiama-h.schools.nsw.gov.au

Kiama High School (abbreviated as KHS) is a government-funded co-educational comprehensive secondary day school, located in the town of Kiama, in the Illawarra region of New South Wales, Australia.

Established in 1954, the school enrolled about 1,040 students in 2018, from Year 7 to Year 12, of whom four percent identified as Indigenous Australians and eight percent were from a language background other than English. The school is operated by the New South Wales Department of Education.

== Notable Alummi ==
- Matt Brown – politician; former NSW Labor member for Kiama
- Sally Fitzgibbons – surfer; U18 Girls Junior World Surfing Champion
- Peter Knott – politician; former Labor member for Gilmore
- Robbie Maddison – world record for the longest motorcycle ramp jump at 322 feet 7 1/2 inches (98.336 m)
- Brett Morris – rugby league player; played with the Canterbury Bulldogs
- Josh Morris – rugby league player; played with the Canterbury Bulldogs
- Ashton Sims – rugby league player
- Korbin Sims – rugby league player
- Tariq Sims – rugby league player
- Grace Stewart – hockey player; played with the Australia women's national field hockey team
- Rod Wishart – rugby league player; represented New South Wales and Kangaroos

== See also ==
- List of government schools in New South Wales: G–P
- List of schools in Illawarra and the South East
- Education in Australia
