= Glendale Technology High School =

Location
- 2A Oakland Street Glendale, New South Wales; Australia; 32°55′38″S 151°38′28″E

Information
- Former name: Glendale High School
- Type: Government-funded co-educational comprehensive secondary day school
- Established: 1970; 56 years ago (as Glendale High School)
- Educational authority: New South Wales Department of Education
- Principal: Anthony Angel
- Teaching staff: 70.4FTE (2025)
- Years: 7–12
- Enrolment: 802 (2025)
- Campus type: Suburban
- Website: glendale-h.schools.nsw.gov.au

Glendale Technology High School is a government-funded co-educational comprehensive secondary day school in Glendale, New South Wales, Australia.

Established in 1970 as Glendale High School, the school enrolled approximately 802 students in 2025, from Year 7 to Year 12, of whom 17 percent identified as Indigenous Australians and nine percent were from a language background other than English. The school is operated by the NSW Department of Education; the principal is Anthony Angel.

== Overview ==
Glendale High School became a Technology High School in 1990. The Glendale Industry Academy, training students in skills shortage areas, is delivered at the school in partnership with TAFE NSW and local industries.

Broadcaster, comedian and writer John Doyle taught at the school in the 1980s.

== See also ==
- List of government schools in New South Wales: G–P
- Education in Australia
