= Andy Patmore =

Australian rugby league footballer

Personal information
- Full name: Andrew Patmore
- Born: 23 May 1968 (age 58) Kempsey, New South Wales, Australia
- Height: 191 cm (6 ft 3 in)
- Weight: 95 kg (14 st 13 lb)

Playing information
- Position: Centre
Club
Years	Team	Pld	T	G	FG	P
1990–93	Canterbury Bulldogs	51	19	0	0	76
1994	Parramatta Eels	2	0	0	0	0
1995	South Sydney Rabbitohs	2	0	0	0	0
1996	Oldham Bears	13	3	0	0	12
	Total	68	22	0	0	88

Coaching information
Representative
Years	Team	Gms	W	D	L	W%
2019–20	New South Wales Women	2	1	0	1	50
- Source: As of 4 October 2026

Andy Patmore (born 23 May 1968) is an Australian former professional rugby league player who played in the 1990s. He played most of his career at the Canterbury Bulldogs, but he also played for the Parramatta Eels, South Sydney Rabbitohs, and the Oldham Bears. His position of choice was centre.

== Playing career ==
Patmore was a Bankstown Sports Junior and Australian Schoolboys representative in 1986. In 1987, he was graded by the Canterbury Bulldogs. In 1988, Patmore was a regular member of the Under 21 team and in 1989, Patmore moved to lock where his season was interrupted by injury. In 1990, Patmore started the season late in reserve grade and received the opportunity to play first grade from new Bulldogs coach Chris Anderson following an injury to long serving centre Andrew Farrar. He made his first grade debut in his side's 9−8 loss to the St. George Dragons at the Jubilee Oval in round 17 of the 1990 season.

In 1991, Patmore became a regular member of the first grade side but was relegated near the end of the season for Jarrod McCracken. In 1992, Patmore started the season in reserve grade and was promoted to first grade for Jason McGrady to become a regular member of the team for the rest of the season. Patmore's stint with the Bulldogs ended at the conclusion of the 1993 season.

In 1994, Patmore joined the Parramatta Eels. He played only 2 games for the Eels, before leaving the club at season's end. In 1995, Patmore joined the South Sydney Rabbitohs where he would once again only play 2 first grade games. Patmore's stint with the Rabbitohs and in Australia ended at the conclusion of the 1995 season. In 1996, Patmore played one final season of rugby league with English side Oldham Bears.

== Coaching career ==
From 2008 to 2014, Patmore was coach of the Canterbury Bulldogs in the National Youth Competition. In 2019, Patmore was named as Ben Cross's replacement as head coach of the New South Wales Rugby League Women's side.
