= Dickson College =

College/secondary school in Dickson, ACT, Australia

Coordinates: 35.249°S 149.153°E

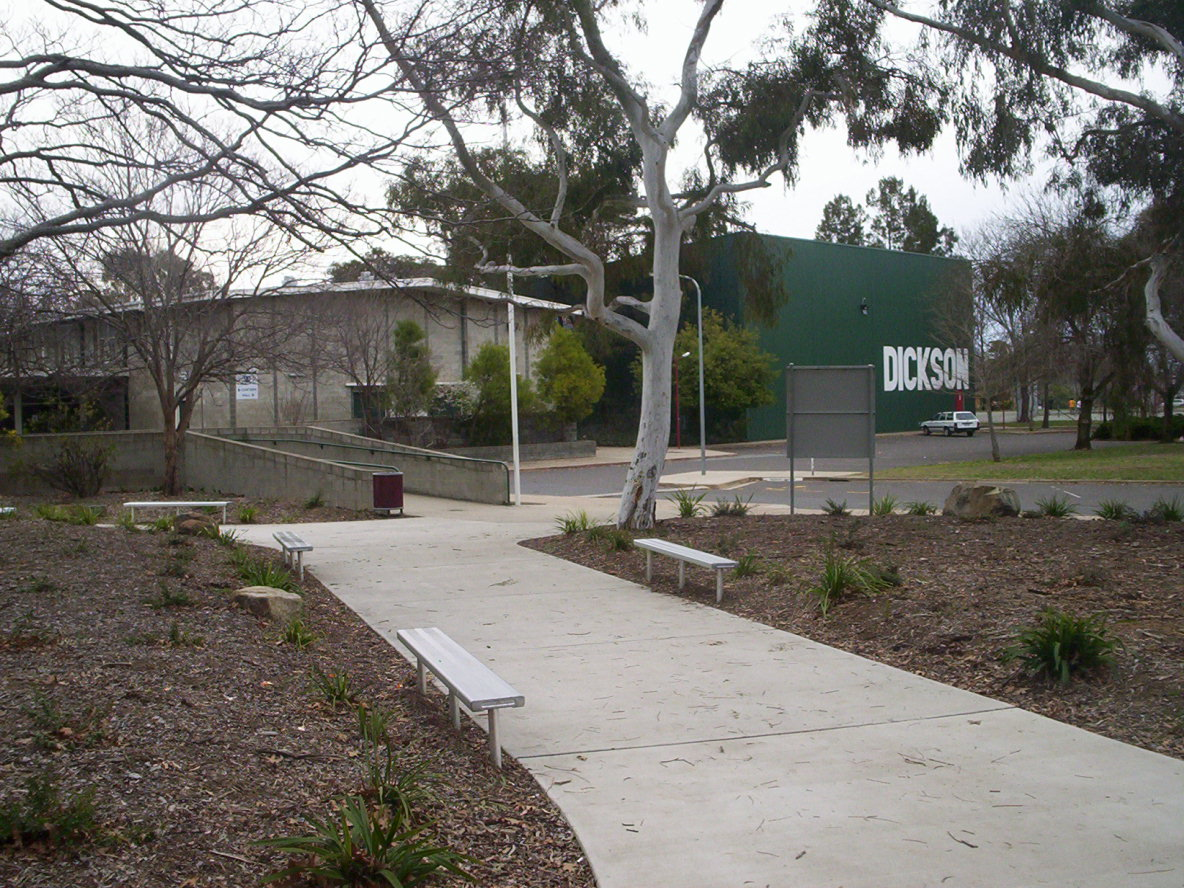

Location
- Phillip Avenue; Dickson, ACT, 2602; Australia

Information
- Type: High school
- Established: 1976
- Principal: Caitlin Horan
- Enrollment: 790
- Campus: Urban
- Website: http://www.dicksonc.act.edu.au/

Dickson College is a public two-year secondary college located in the Canberra suburb of Dickson, Australian Capital Territory. It was established in 1976 on the former Dickson High School campus when it closed. This was the beginning of the Australian Capital Territory's senior high school system.

It was set to close after being announced as the sole college in Canberra to be eliminated for the Towards 2020 plan, but was spared when the final decision was made.

The college draws its students from Canberra's inner north, principally taking students from Campbell and Lyneham High Schools.

== Enrolment ==
Currently there are just under 1000 students enrolled at Dickson College. The feeder schools are Lyneham High School, Campbell High School, and Emmaus High School.

== Curriculum ==
Students are prepared for the ACT Year 12 Certificate, as mandated by the Department of Education and Board of Senior Secondary Studies.

More than half of Dickson College students who graduate with a Year 12 Certificate also obtain an ATAR and go on to study at university. In 2007 of the 215 students awarded a Year 12 certificate, 61% were awarded Tertiary Education Statements. In 2007, the median UAI gained by students of Dickson College was 78 compared with the average of students from all across ACT colleges of 79. Over 78% of students from the college who were awarded Tertiary Education Statements in 2007 scored over 65 for their UAI compared with 70% of all ACT students. 68 students were awarded a vocational certificate in 2007 and 131 students were awarded a vocational statement of attainment.

== See also ==
- List of schools in the Australian Capital Territory

== Notable alumni ==
- Genevieve Bell, Australian academic
- David Branson, artist, theatre director, actor and musician
- Jackie Chan, actor, filmmaker and martial artist (attended Dickson College in 1971)
- Stephen Larkham, Australian rugby union representative.
- Sussan Ley, former leader of the Liberal Party
- Garth Nix, author of young adult fantasy novels
- Emily Banks, Epidemiologist
- Paul McDermott, Comedian
