= Dapto High School =

Location
- Dapto, Illawarra region, New South Wales; Australia; 34°29′59″S 150°47′8″E

Information
- Type: Government-funded co-educational comprehensive secondary day school
- Motto: Strive for Higher Things
- Established: 1958; 68 years ago
- School district: Lake Illawarra South; Regional South
- Educational authority: New South Wales Department of Education
- Principal: Joel Burnett
- Deputy Principals: Daniel Inness; Darcy Moore
- Teaching staff: 70.5 FTE (2018)
- Enrolment: 917 (2018)
- Campus: Outer suburban / Regional
- Colours: Yellow, maroon, and white
- Website: dapto-h.schools.nsw.gov.au

Dapto High School is a government-funded co-educational comprehensive secondary day school, located in Dapto, a suburb of Wollongong in the Illawarra region of New South Wales, Australia.

Established in 1958, the school enrolled approximately 900 students in 2018, from Year 7 to Year 12, of whom six percent identified as Indigenous Australians and nine percent were from a language background other than English. The school is operated by the New South Wales Department of Education; the principal is Joel Burnett.

== School-to-work program ==
In 2002, Dapto was the subject of a case study for its school-to-work program, which chronicled how the school innovated a centralized reporting program via school reports, which turned around an otherwise unsuccessful program and made the program a "whole new approach" which was recommended for other schools. As a result of this program the school's careers advisor, Steve Heinecke, was awarded the title of top careers advisor in New South Wales in 2005.

== Notable alumni ==
- Mathew Head – rugby league player
- Paul McGregor – rugby league player
- Corey Tutt – STEM champion, 2020 NSW Young Australian of the Year, and founder of DeadlyScience
- Dean Young – rugby league player

== See also ==
- List of government schools in New South Wales
- List of schools in Illawarra and the South East
- Education in Australia
