= All Saints College, Maitland =

All Saints College (ASC)

Location
- Maitland, Hunter Valley, New South Wales; Australia; 32°44′15″S 151°33′33″E

Information
- Type: Independent co-educational secondary day school
- Motto: Integrity
- Denomination: Roman Catholic
- Established: 2018; 8 years ago
- Educational authority: New South Wales Department of Education
- Oversight: Catholic Schools Office, Diocese of Maitland-Newcastle
- College Principal: Tony McCudden.
- Enrolment: 586 (St Mary's); 881 (St Peter's)
- Slogan: christius inspiratus

All Saints College is a dual-campus independent Roman Catholic co-educational secondary day school, located in the Hunter Valley region of New South Wales, Australia. The college is administered by the Catholic Schools Office of the Roman Catholic Diocese of Maitland-Newcastle.

The college's has two campuses, both located in Maitland. The Senior Campus caters for students in Year 11 and Year 12. The Junior Campus caters for students in Year 7 to Year 10.

== History ==
The forebears of All Saints College are St John's Boys School, a primary school established in 1838, St Mary's Dominican Convent School, established in 1867, and the Marist Brothers High School, Maitland (later known as St Peter's High School).

In September 1990 Bishop Leo Clarke (the Bishop of the Diocese of Maitland Newcastle) announced that the three local single-sex Catholic high schools would become co-educational, and united under the banner of All Saints College. St Joseph's College, in the rural village of Lochinvar, and St Peter's were to be Years 7–10 and St Mary's, Years 11–12. The three schools began to operate in their current co-educational format in 1992. The St Mary's and St Peter's campuses are situated in the heart of Maitland and the St Joseph's campus is situated eleven kilometres (seven miles) west of Maitland.

Following a Study into the Provision of Catholic Education in the Diocese of Maitland-Newcastle, in 2018 St Joseph's College, Lochinvar terminated its membership of All Saints College and became a stand-alone Years 7–12 school. In 2016, it was announced that St Peter's Campus, Maitland principal Michael Blake had secured the position of principal at Champagnat College, Pagewood and concluded his role at St Peter's at the end of Term 2. All Saints College was going to convert the school to one campus being St Peters. However, a successful community campaign titled "Save St Mary's" resulted in a reversal of the decision, with St Mary's to remain open as the senior campus.

In 2024 it was reported that a teacher at the school was charged with having sex with a 17-year-old student following a police investigation. The teacher was placed on “administrative leave” after being accused of serious misconduct. Police have confirmed the 39-year-old man has been charged with nine counts of sexual intercourse with a person under his care aged between 17 and 18. In 2025, College Principal Brian Lacey officially retired from being Principal at All Saints College, his replacement has been announced as Mr Tony McCudden.

== Notable alumni ==
- Andrew Johns, rugby league player
- Mark Hughes, rugby league player
- Max King, rugby league player
- Hudson Young, rugby league player

== See also ==
- List of non-government schools in New South Wales
- Catholic education in Australia
