= Tom Freebairn =

Australian rugby league footballer

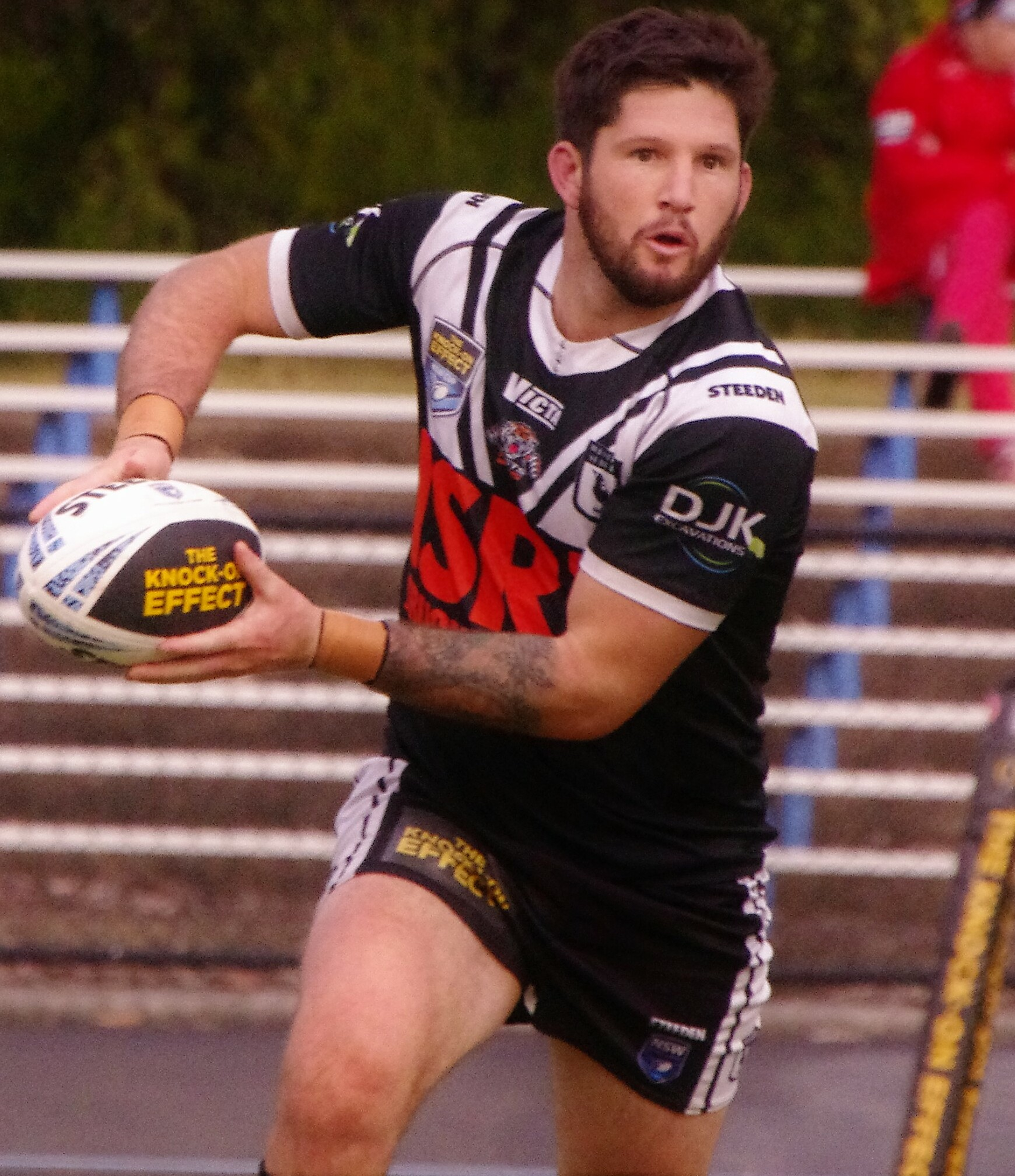

Personal information
- Full name: Thomas Freebairn
- Born: 6 November 1995 (age 29); Ipswich, Queensland, Australia
- Height: 6 ft 1 in (186 cm)
- Weight: 15 st 4 lb (97 kg)

Playing information
- Position: Lock, Hooker, Second-row
Club
Years	Team	Pld	T	G	FG	P
2022	Wests Tigers	5	2	0	0	8
- Source: As of 28 August 2022

Tom Freebairn (born 6 November 1995) is an Australian professional rugby league footballer who plays as a lock and second-row forward.

He previously played for the Wests Tigers in the National Rugby League (NRL).

== Background ==
Freebairn was born in Ipswich and previously played for and captained the North Sydney Bears in the NSW Cup. Freebairn also made appearances for the Sydney Roosters in the 2020 NRL Nines.

== Career ==
=== 2022 ===
Freebairn made his debut in Round 21 of the 2022 NRL season for the Tigers against the Newcastle Knights. In round 24, Freebairn scored two tries for the Wests Tigers in a 24-22 loss against St. George Illawarra. In October, Freebairn was named as Western Suburbs NSW Cup player of the season.
