= Sydney Secondary College Leichhardt Campus =

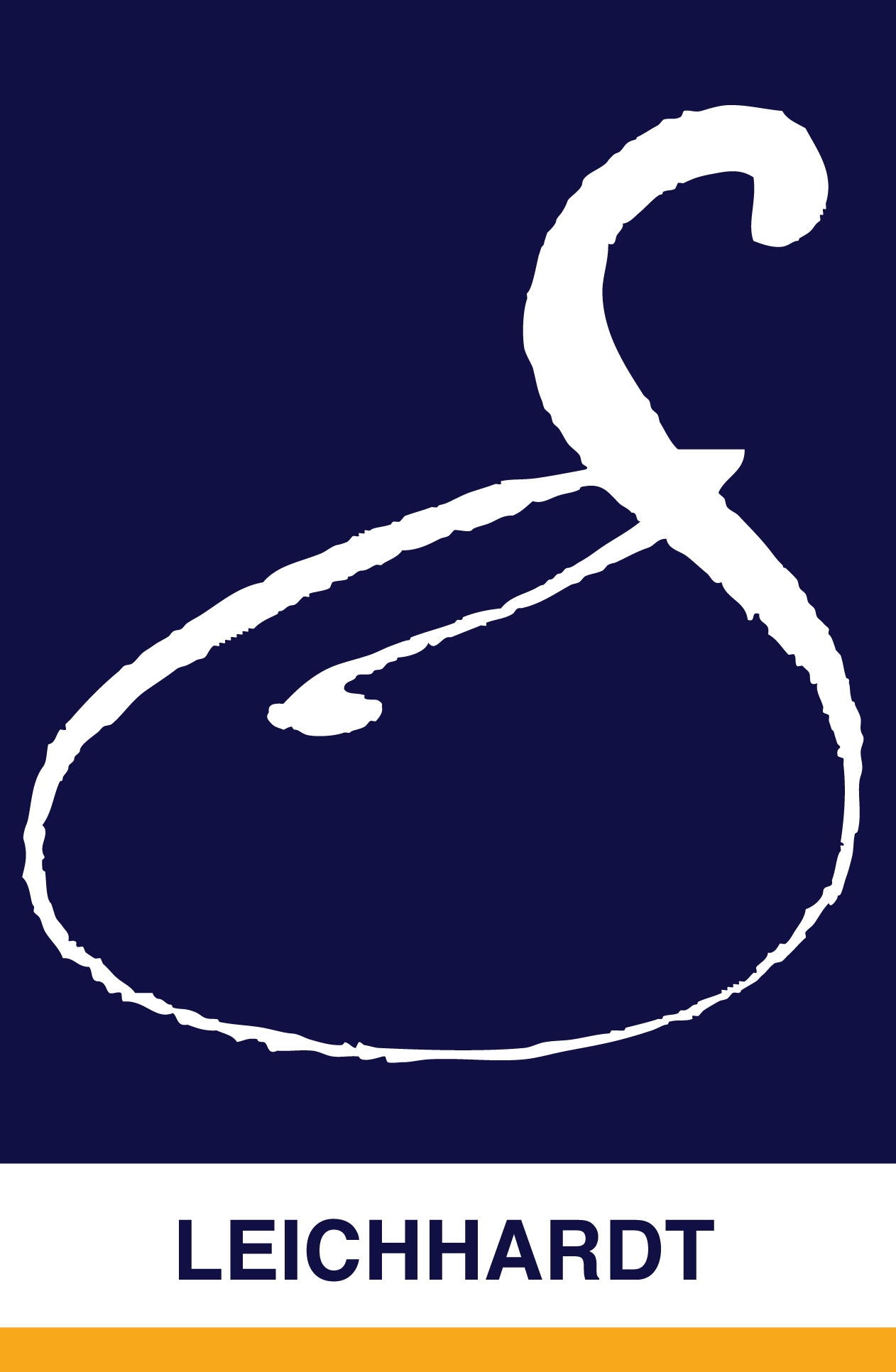

Location
- Leichhardt, Inner Western Sydney, New South Wales; Australia; 33°52′45″S 151°9′33″E

Information
- Former name: Leichhardt High School
- Type: Government-funded, co-educational, dual modality, partially academically selective and comprehensive junior secondary day school
- Motto: Quality, Opportunity, Diversity
- Established: 2002; 24 years ago
- School district: Iron Cove; Metropolitan South
- Educational authority: New South Wales Department of Education
- Principal: Craig Marland
- Years: 7–10
- Enrolment: ~818 (2024)
- Colours: Dark blue and gold
- Website: leichhardt-h.schools.nsw.gov.au

The Leichhardt Campus of the Sydney Secondary College is a government-funded, co-educational, dual modality, partially academically selective and comprehensive junior secondary day school, located in the inner-western Sydney suburb of Leichhardt, New South Wales, Australia. Together with the senior school at the Blackwattle Bay Campus and the other junior school at Balmain Campus, the school is a part of the Sydney Secondary College.

Established in 2002, the campus caters for approximately 1000 students from Year 7 to Year 10.

== History ==
Prior to 2002, the school was known as Leichhardt High School which was originally founded as a co-educational and comprehensive school in 1972. Established in an area with a large number of migrant families, particularly from Mediterranean backgrounds, the school has long been known for its diversity of cultural backgrounds. This led to focused funding and pedagogical approaches towards students of non English-speaking backgrounds.

Declining enrolments at the school, together with a push towards multi-campus colleges (i.e., also including the later established Northern Beaches Secondary College and Georges River College among others) led to the amalgamation of former high schools, Leichhardt High School, Balmain High School and Glebe High School into Sydney Secondary College in 2002. In the first year after establishment, the college had a combined enrolment of 1,800, up from 1,250 in 2003.

In 2003, Sydney Secondary College was one of 36 public schools to receive an Excellence Award from the former NSW Department of Education's director-general, Jan McClelland, for its "promotion of public education".

== Sport ==
At Sydney Secondary College, sport is a strong focus of all three campuses. There are three annual combined college carnivals: Swimming, Cross Country and Athletics. After each College sporting event, the top two male and female participants for each age group and every event are invited to compete at the Bligh Zone carnivals against other schools in the local sporting zone.

The college has four respective sporting colour houses named after local sporting identities:

- Stewart (Geoff Stewart)
- Pearce (Wayne Pearce)
- Woods (Taryn Woods)
- Sauvage (Louise Sauvage)

Students are also given the opportunity to participate in a variety of competitive team sports against other schools such as soccer, netball, basketball, volleyball, European handball, touch football, cricket and softball as well as recreational and social sports such as cycling, dance/yoga, badminton, golf, table tennis, fitness walking, handball, martial arts and tennis.

== Notable alumni ==
- Wayne Pearce – rugby league player (attended as Leichhardt High School)
- Naomi Sequeira – actress and singer
- Renuga Veeran – badminton player; represented Australia at the 2012 Olympics

== See also ==
- List of government schools in New South Wales
- List of selective high schools in New South Wales
