= Sydney Secondary College Blackwattle Bay Campus =

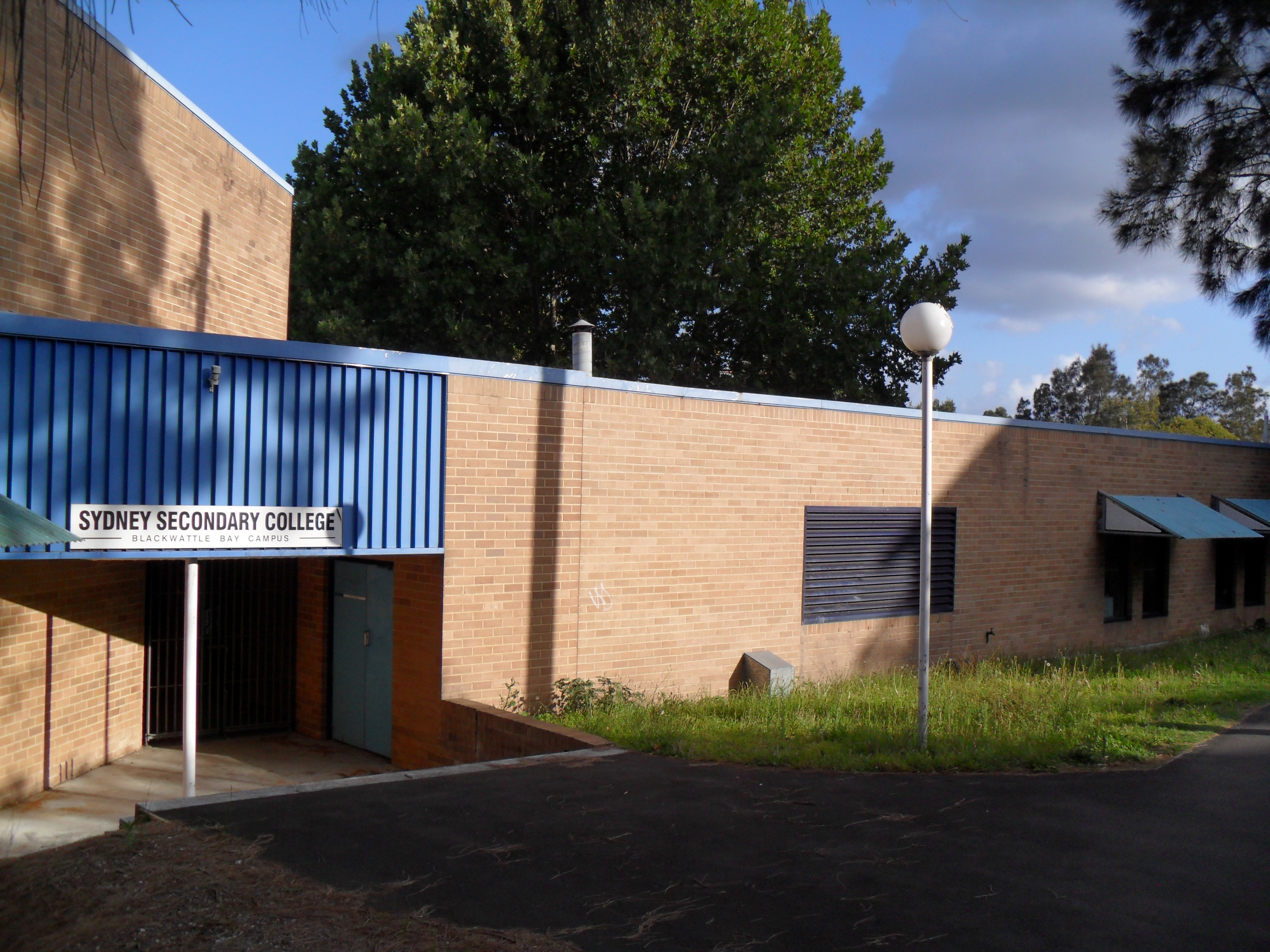

Location
- Glebe, Sydney, New South Wales; Australia; 33°52′31″S 151°11′16″E

Information
- Former name: Glebe High School
- Type: Government-funded co-educational dual modality partially academically selective and comprehensive senior secondary day school
- Motto: Quality, Opportunity, Diversity
- Established: 1979; 47 years ago (as Glebe High School)
- School district: Iron Cove
- Educational authority: New South Wales Department of Education
- Principal: Leiza Lewis
- Years: 11–12
- Enrolment: ~800 (2021)
- Campus type: Urban
- Colours: Navy blue and white
- Website: sscbwattle-h.schools.nsw.gov.au

The Blackwattle Bay Campus of the Sydney Secondary College is a government-funded co-educational dual modality comprehensive senior secondary day school, located in the Inner West Sydney suburb of Glebe, Australia.

Established in 1979 as Glebe High School, the campus caters for approximately 750 students in Year 11 and Year 12. Since 2005, the campus has served exclusively as the senior school of the Sydney Secondary College and its two junior campuses are Balmain and Leichhardt campuses.

== History ==
=== Establishment of Glebe High School ===
Discussions of creating a new high school in Glebe started around late 1977 with many local teachers rising concerns over the lack of accommodation for an increasingly large number of local students. Hearing these concerns, the NSW Department of Education agreed to investigate the demography and needs of the local area. As an outcome of this study, the Department of Education arranged to create a new high school in Glebe as a part of a new scheme and accommodate for the overflow of students from other schools in the local district.

After deciding to create a school in Glebe, the NSW Department of Education was searching for a suitable location. A local lumber yard owned by George Hudson and called Hudson Timber Yard went on the market in 1979 and the Department of Education purchased the waterfront property for $1.86 million (equivalent to $9.9 million in 2025) with the sale being seen as a "bargain".

Glebe High School was established in 1979, starting with 110 students and 17 staff members and exclusively catering for Year 7 during its first year.

Located upon the newly-purchased land, students and staff were all housed in demountable classrooms, with permanent buildings being included in the initial plan for the school.

=== Construction of Permanent Buildings ===
During a public meeting in July 1980, at Glebe's town hall, Glebe High School's student enrolment numbers were reported to be 1600 lower than expected, leading the NSW Department of Education to reconsider the creation of an originally planned permanent building. Following this discovery, Minister Paul Landa decided to defer the creation of permanent buildings until a more detailed report of Glebe High School was completed. An investigative report of the school was created by a working party consisting of two departmental officers, two local teachers elected by the Inner West Teachers Association and two members of the Glebe P&C.

Construction of the school's permanent buildings began in December 1980, with the students and staff continuing to use demountable classrooms whilst the new buildings were being constructed. Permanent buildings were completed in the early 1980s.

=== Joining Sydney Secondary College ===
In 2002, the school became part of Sydney Secondary College and was renamed Blackwattle Bay Campus. Since 2005, it is exclusively a senior campus catering for Years 11 and 12. This enables the school to offer one of the largest range of Higher School Certificate courses in Sydney. Student enrolments increased significantly when the school was transformed into a senior campus.

=== Recent ===
The campus has a sister-school relationship with Malibaca Yamato High School in East Timor, and a volunteer project in community work.

== Achievements ==
In 2005, Fawad Qaiser became the first student to sit for a Higher School Certificate (HSC) examination using Auslan, the Australian sign language. In 2011, Chinese language teacher, Chorng Leu, was awarded a Premier’s Teacher Scholarship to undertake an international study tour. In 2012, local resident Robert Brand, his son Jason Brand, together with students from Leichhardt Public School and the senior students at the Blackwattle Bay Campus, launched and tracked a balloon into near space as a science project. The balloon reached approximately 25 kilometres (16 mi) before it burst.

=== First in Course ===
A number of Blackwattle Bay students have been awarded first place in the state in various HSC courses:

| Year | Name | Course | Reference |
|---|---|---|---|
| 2024 | Travis King | Design and Technology | |
| 2023 | Ema Jazbec | Human Services Examination | |
| 2019 | Antonia Hendriks | Dutch Continuers | |
| 2019 | Vita Purwanto | Indonesian and Literature | |
| 2019 | Simon Peyrachon | Spanish Continuers | |
| 2018 | Elliot Malyon | Design and Technology | |
| 2017 | Cattleya U-Thaipat | Travel and Events Examination | |
| 2016 | Khrystyna Matiiuk | Ukrainian Continuers | |
| 2010 | Damian Spinks | Chinese Beginners | |
| 2008 | Shifra Waks | Chinese Beginners; French Beginners | |
| 2006 | Lily Ng | Japanese Beginners | |
| 2005 | Yi Wen Zhang | Chinese Background Speakers | |
| 2004 | Chrissie Lukas | Chinese Beginners | |
| 2002 | Andrew Hammett | Information Technology | |
| 2001 | Natalia Wiguno | Chinese Beginners | |

== Sports ==
The school offers various sports which are not compulsory for all Year 11 students, including rowing which can be done in the morning or afternoon. Blackwattle Bay is on the waterfront, and accordingly offers both rowing and kayaking as sporting options, a unique feature of the sporting curriculum that sets it apart from other urban Sydney high schools. A wide range of sports are available at Blackwattle Bay Campus. A student has the choice to participate in badminton, soccer, basketball, netball, baseball, football, table tennis, fitness walking, tennis, rockclimbing, boxing, swimming or softball.

Students with disabilities participate in an annual state athletics carnival that can lead to selection in the Australian team for the Paralympic Games.

== See also ==
- List of government schools in New South Wales
- List of selective high schools in New South Wales
