= Sydney Secondary College Balmain Campus =

Location
- Rozelle, Sydney, New South Wales; Australia; 33°51′32″S 151°10′15″E

Information
- Former name: Balmain High School
- Type: Government-funded co-educational dual modality partially academically selective and comprehensive junior secondary day school
- Motto: Quality, Opportunity, Diversity
- Established: 1975; 51 years ago (as Balmain High School); 2002; 24 years ago (as Sydney Secondary College Balmain Campus)
- School district: Iron Cove; Metropolitan South
- Educational authority: New South Wales Department of Education
- Principal: Mark Corbett
- Enrolment: ~758 (2018)
- Campus: Urban
- Colours: Black and white
- Website: balmain-h.schools.nsw.gov.au

The Balmain Campus of Sydney Secondary College is a government-funded co-educational dual modality partially academically selective and comprehensive junior secondary day school, located in the Inner West Sydney suburb of Rozelle, New South Wales, Australia.

Established in 1975 at the Balmain High School, the campus caters for approximately 750 students from Year 7 to Year 10. The school is operated by the New South Wales Department of Education; the current principal is Mark Corbett.

== History ==
Established in 1975 as Balmain High School, the school has since taken part in several changes, most notably in a coalition with neighbouring inner-western schools. Since 2002, together with the senior school at the Blackwattle Bay Campus and the other junior school at Leichhardt Campus, the school is part of the Sydney Secondary College. Throughout the school's history, it has remained a public school operated by the New South Wales Department of Education.

The Balmain Campus was also the birthplace of the film festival, Flickerfest.

== Support and Inclusive Education Unit ==
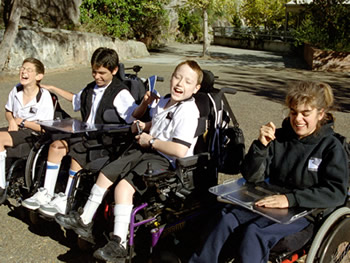
Students from the Support and Inclusive Education Unit

Balmain Campus is acclaimed among the Sydney Secondary College for its Support and Inclusive Education Unit for various disabilities. Balmain campus was the only high school in South-East Sydney to have a Satellite class with ASPECT, but it was shut down in 2009. The school underwent renovations during the 1980s to enable the entire school to be completely facilitated for wheelchair access, and other various needs of the disabled students. One of the major renovations included a central private lift for disabled students which provides access to the four main floors in the school.

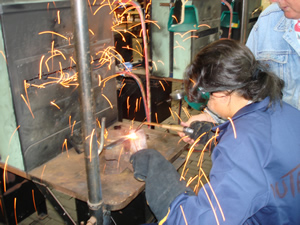
Student operating a welder during a design and technology class

== Facilities ==
The Campus is divided sequentially into six blocks:

- A, B and C Block: Support Unit classrooms and facilities.
- G Block: English on ground floor; Social Science on first floor; and Mathematics on second floor.
- J Block: Science and Information Technology on ground and first floor; second floor holds the school office.
- D Block: Design and Technology on ground floor, Visual Arts first floor; Mathematics and Science staff rooms on second floor; Physical Education theoretical classrooms on third floor.
- E Block: Design and Technology workshops on ground floor, Performing Arts and Visual arts on first floor; Textiles laboratories and Hospitality kitchens on second floor.
- F Block: Assembly Hall and Canteen on upper floor; Physical Education student changerooms/showers, and staff room on lower floor.

Throughout the campus, student bathrooms and bubblers have been installed as well as outdoor furniture (lunch benches, seats). The campus also, as previously mentioned, is facilitated with ramps, stairlifts, and a central lift to assist physically disabled student's access to the school grounds.

Other school facilities also include a library, basketball courts, netball courts, two football fields, cricket nets and a gymnasium.

A waterfront pontoon for launching light watercraft and other vessels has been scheduled for development in 2008. Following construction, the pontoon was refurbished ahead of the 2026 school year

== Notable alumni ==
- Alex Lloyd – singer-songwriter
- C.W. Stoneking – blues artist

== See also ==
- List of government schools in New South Wales
- List of selective high schools in New South Wales
