= Glebe High School =

Glebe High School may refer to:

- Glebe Collegiate Institute, Ottawa, Canada
- A former name for a school which was merged to become the Blackwattle Bay Campus of Sydney Secondary College, Sydney, Australia
