= Wayne Pearce =

Australia international rugby league footballer

Wayne Pearce OAM
Personal information
- Full name: Wayne John Pearce
- Born: 29 March 1960 (age 66) Balmain, New South Wales, Australia

Playing information
- Height: 180 cm (5 ft 11 in)
- Weight: 89 kg (14 st 0 lb)
- Position: Lock, Second-row
Club
Years	Team	Pld	T	G	FG	P
1980–90	Balmain Tigers	193	33	0	0	123
Representative
Years	Team	Pld	T	G	FG	P
1983–88	New South Wales	16	3	0	0	12
1982–88	Australia	19	6	0	0	21
1983–88	NSW City	6	1	0	0	4

Coaching information
Club
Years	Team	Gms	W	D	L	W%
1994–99	Balmain Tigers	158	55	1	101	35
2000	Wests Tigers	26	11	2	13	42
	Total	184	66	3	114	36
Representative
Years	Team	Gms	W	D	L	W%
1999–01	New South Wales	9	5	1	3	56
- Relatives: Mitchell Pearce (son)

Wayne John Pearce OAM (born 29 March 1960 in Balmain, New South Wales) is an Australian former professional rugby league footballer and coach. A lock for the Balmain Tigers, he was known as Junior. Pearce represented New South Wales in the State of Origin Series as well as the Australian national rugby league team. Pearce also made an appearance the 1988 Australian television movie The First Kangaroos, which depicted the 1908–09 Kangaroo tour of Great Britain.

== Coaching career ==
Pearce took over as Balmain coach in 1994, and coached Balmain for six seasons before they merged with the Western Suburbs Magpies. In 2000, Pearce became the inaugural coach of the Wests Tigers but stepped down after one season. Pearce also coached New South Wales for three seasons and in 2000 led New South Wales to a clean sweep winning the series 3–0. In 2001, Pearce coached NSW in what would prove to be his last series. His last game in charge resulted in a 40–14 defeat by Queensland.

== Accolades ==
In February 2008, Pearce was named in the list of Australia's 100 Greatest Players (1908–2007), which was commissioned by the NRL and ARL to celebrate the code's centenary year in Australia.

== Personal life ==
Pearce attended Ibrox Park Boys' High School (later renamed Leichhardt High School), now Sydney Secondary College Leichhardt Campus.

His son Mitchell Pearce is a former rugby league player.
