= Ku-ring-gai High School =

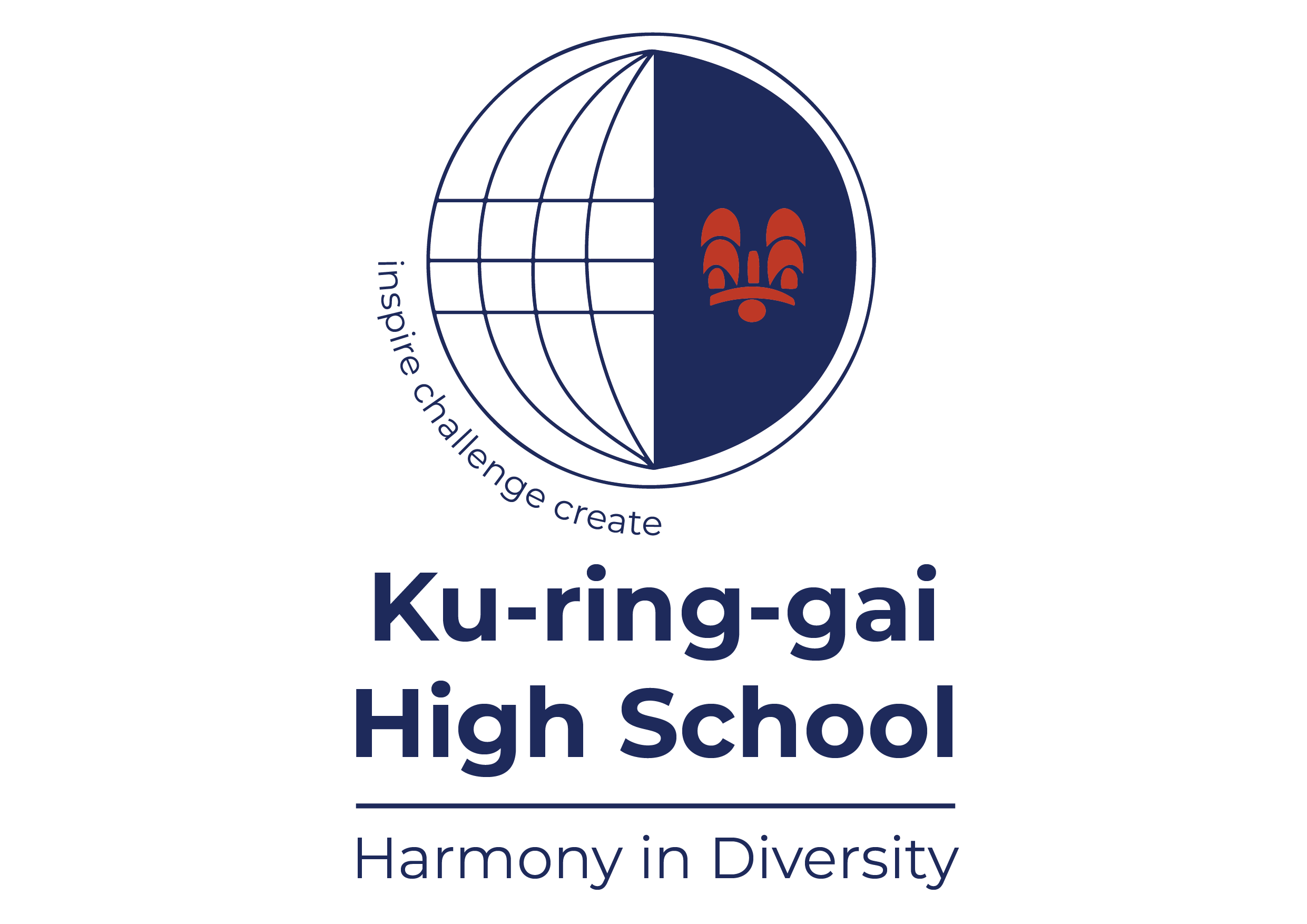

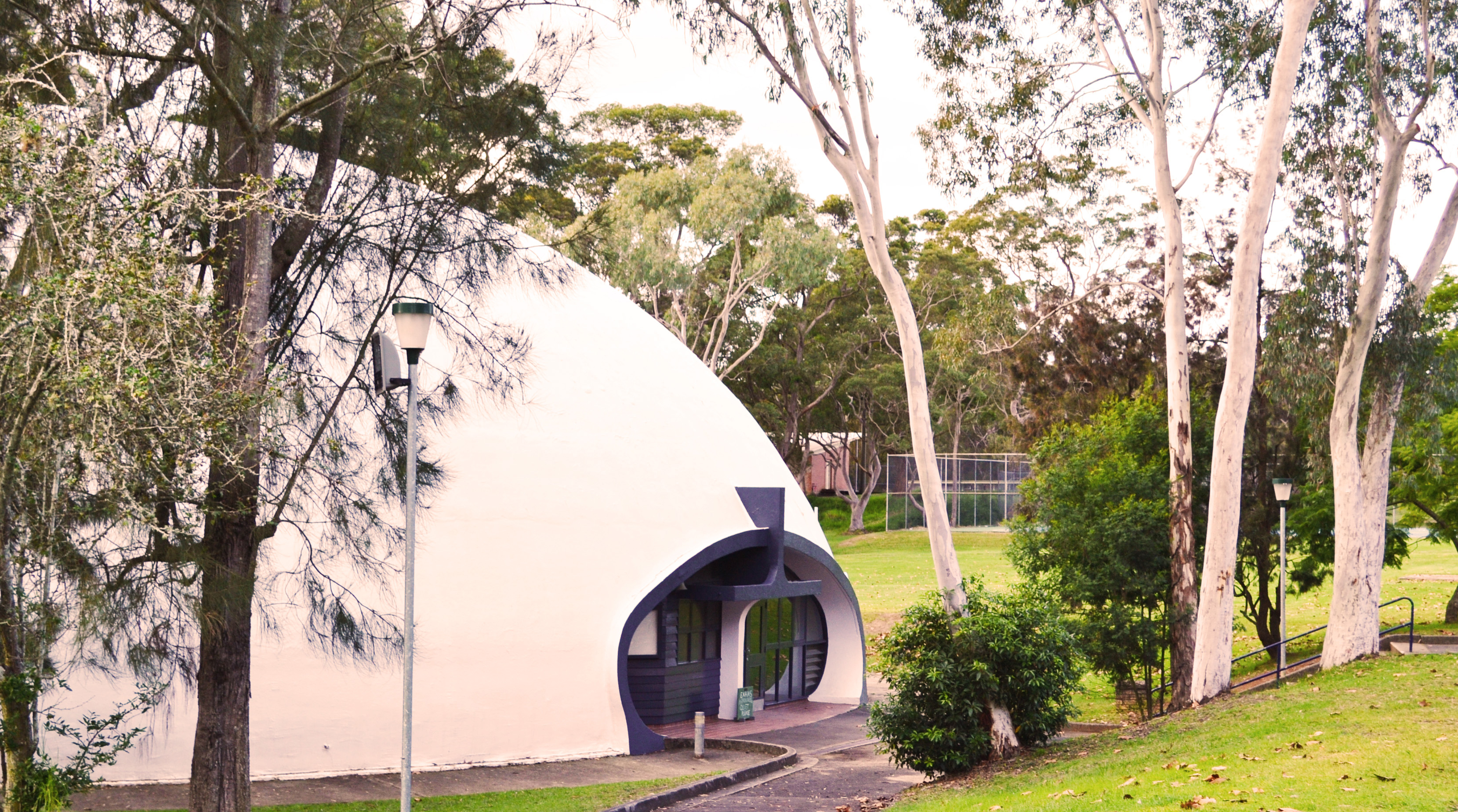
- Margaret Preston Hall

Location
- Bobbin Head Road, North Turramurra, Upper North Shore of Sydney, New South Wales; Australia; 33°41′31″S 151°09′11″E

Information
- Former name: Ku-ring-gai Creative Arts High School (1996–2016)
- Type: Government-funded co-educational comprehensive and specialist secondary day school
- Motto: Harmony in Diversity
- Established: February 1965; 61 years ago
- Founder: Bill Eason
- School district: Metropolitan North: Gordon
- Educational authority: New South Wales Department of Education
- Specialist: Performing arts
- Principal: Stephen Plummer
- Years: 7–12
- Enrolment: c. 600
- Area: 10 hectares (25 acres)
- Campus type: Suburban
- Houses: Churchill, Lincoln, Curie, Tagore
- Colours: Maroon, navy and green
- Website: kuringgai-h.schools.nsw.gov.au

Ku-ring-gai High School (abbreviated as KHS), formerly Ku-ring-gai Creative Arts High School (1996–2016), is a government-funded co-educational comprehensive and specialist secondary day school with a speciality in creative and performing arts. The school is located in North Turramurra, on the Upper North Shore of Sydney, New South Wales, Australia. The school is set on 10 hectares (25 acres) and located adjacent to the Ku-ring-gai Chase National Park.

== School catchment area and student selection ==
As a New South Wales Department of Education public high school, KHS accepts all students in Year 7 to Year 12 living in its catchment area. The catchment covers locations in Ku-ring-gai and Hornsby councils, including Dangar Island.

The school also accepts, if there's space, those who "demonstrate outstanding ability and commitment in the creative arts in either dance, music, drama and/or visual arts ". Students who apply for enrolment under this criterion are required to provide a portfolio demonstrating this ability. The school also takes international and exchange students and is part of the International Students Program of the NSW Department of Education.

== Campus and facilities ==
The school features one of the last remaining Binishells (dome-shaped hall) called the "Margaret Preston Hall" and is one of the few public schools in New South Wales with a full sized hockey field.

In July 2020, refurbishment was completed with the construction of new facilities. This included a new multipurpose hall, and the refurbishment of 15 existing learning spaces.

== History ==
The school opened in February 1965 with its first group of Year 7 students. Ku-ring-gai was the first of a second wave of new co-educational high schools built in the Sydney suburbs.

The school's first headmaster was Bill Eason, who later went on to found the Australian Independent School at North Ryde.

The four houses, which are still part of the school today, and the names of the four original classroom buildings were set in 1965 - Churchill, Curie, Tagore, and Lincoln. The Churchill House is represented by the colour red; Curie House yellow; Tagore House green and Lincoln House blue. The school colours were originally brown and gold. The Lincoln block was added after 1970. At that time, the grounds included an obstacle course (later dismantled for safety reasons) and three free-standing cottages for creative arts, music and one for senior students.

Ku-ring-gai was a local high school until 1996 when Mrs. B. Peatie became the headmistress and requested permission from the Department of Education to become selective in creative arts. Since then, there have been up to 900 students registered each year. In 2015, it celebrated its 50th year and in 2016 reverted to the name "Ku-ring-gai High School".

== Creative arts ==
The school was formerly creative arts-based.

Members of the school choir as well as a large number of dancers are selected to perform at the NSW Schools Spectacular each year.

== Notable alumni ==
- Catherine Jinks, author
- Brad Allan, part of the 1977–78 Australian Schoolboys Rugby Team.
- Geraldine Hakewill, actress

== See also ==
- List of government schools in New South Wales
- List of creative and performing arts high schools in New South Wales
- List of selective high schools in New South Wales
