= Obi Kyei =

Australian-British basketball player

Sydney Comets
- Position: Center
- League: NBL1 East

Personal information
- Born: 3 December 1994 (age 31) Sydney, New South Wales, Australia
- Listed height: 206 cm (6 ft 9 in)
- Listed weight: 90 kg (198 lb)

Career information
- High school: Sydney Secondary (Sydney, New South Wales)
- College: Metro State (2013–2015); Eckerd (2015–2017)
- NBA draft: 2017: undrafted
- Playing career: 2012–present

Career history
- 2012–2013: Sydney Comets
- 2017: Albury Wodonga Bandits
- 2017: Cuxhaven BasCats
- 2017: Leeds Force
- 2018: Logan Thunder
- 2018–2019: Força Lleida CE
- 2019–2020: Adelaide 36ers
- 2021–2022: Logan Thunder
- 2024–present: Sydney Comets

Obiri Yeboah Kyei (born 3 December 1994) is an Australian-British professional basketball player for the Sydney Comets of NBL1 East. He played college basketball for NCAA Division II schools Metro State and Eckerd College.

== Early life ==
Kyei was born in Sydney, New South Wales, to a Ghanaian father. He attended Sydney Secondary College and played in the Waratah League in 2012 and 2013 for the Sydney Comets.

== College career ==
Kyei played college basketball for Metro State (2013–2015) and Eckerd College (2015–2017).

== Professional career ==
In July 2017, Kyei had a one-game stint for the Albury Wodonga Bandits in the South East Australian Basketball League (SEABL).

Kyei joined Cuxhaven BasCats of the German ProB for the 2017–18 season. He played 10 games between 23 September and 18 November. He subsequently joined the Leeds Force of the British Basketball League, where he played two games between 26 November and 1 December.

Kyei joined the Logan Thunder of the Queensland Basketball League (QBL) for the 2018 season.

In August 2018, Kyei signed with Força Lleida CE of the Spanish LEB Gold.

On 21 May 2019, Kyei signed a two-year deal with the Adelaide 36ers of the Australian National Basketball League (NBL). He averaged 3.3 points and 4.2 rebounds in 28 games played for the team. On 29 September 2020, he was granted a release by the 36ers to pursue business interests.

On 21 June 2021, Kyei joined the Logan Thunder of the NBL1 North for the remainder of the 2021 season. He averaged 11.2 points and 10.2 rebounds per game in five games played. He returned to the Thunder for the 2022 season and averaged 10.1 points and 11.4 rebounds in 11 games.

Kyei joined the Sydney Comets of NBL1 East for the 2024 season.

== Fashion career ==
Kyei creates sustainable fashion for his label Obiri using vintage clothes and deadstock fabrics to produce new clothing. He fronted the campaign for Champion Australia's sustainable Re:Bound collection in 2021.

== Personal life ==
Kyei holds Australian and British dual citizenship.
