= Sydney Secondary College =

Location
- Leichhardt, Rozelle and Glebe, Sydney, New South Wales; Australia: 33°52′30″S 151°11′17″E (Blackwattle); 33°52′45″S 151°9′33″E (Leichhardt); 33°51′32″S 151°10′15″E (Balmain)

Information
- Type: Government-funded, co-educational, dual modality, partially academically selective and comprehensive secondary day school
- Motto: Quality, Opportunity, Diversity
- Established: 2002; 24 years ago
- School district: Iron Cove
- Educational authority: New South Wales Department of Education
- Years: 7–10: Leichhardt & Balmain; 11–12: Blackwattle
- Enrolment: ~2,000
- Campuses: Leichhardt; Balmain; Blackwattle
- Campus type: Urban
- Colours: Leichhardt: Light blue and grey Balmain: White and black Blackwattle Bay: White and navy
- Website: leichhardt-h.schools.nsw.gov.au; sscbwattle-h.schools.nsw.gov.au; balmain-h.schools.nsw.gov.au

Sydney Secondary College is a multi-campus urban government-funded, co-educational, dual modality, partially academically selective and comprehensive secondary day school, located in the Inner West region of Sydney, New South Wales, Australia.

Established in 2002, the college's three campuses are located in the Sydney suburbs of Leichhardt, Rozelle and Glebe and cater for approximately 2,000 students from Year 7 to Year 12.

== Campuses ==
The three campuses that make up Sydney Secondary College are:

- Leichhardt Campus: caters for students in years 7–10 only
- Balmain Campus: caters for students in years 7–10 only
- Blackwattle Bay Campus: caters for students in years 11–12 only

Students who enrol at either of the Balmain or Leichhardt Campuses usually continue to senior secondary school at the Blackwattle Bay Campus.

== History ==
The college was formed in 2002, after a plan for revitalisation of public education in the inner-city was introduced. The three pre-existing independent high schools were linked to form Sydney Secondary College. Facilities across the three campuses were renovated.

Starting from 2005, Leichhardt and Balmain became junior campuses (years 7–10), with an emphasis on middle schooling. Blackwattle Bay, formerly Glebe High School, became the specialist senior campus (11–12), being able to offer one of the widest curriculum choices in Sydney.

Leichhardt, while formerly the smallest school in NSW (in terms of area) has now expanded with a sporting oval, at the cost of A$6 million.

The founding College Principal was Mark Anderson AM who developed the college focus of 'quality, opportunity and diversity'.

== Sport ==
Sport is compulsory for students in year 7–10 and on Tuesday afternoons. The junior Campuses have a strong sporting tradition and a friendly rivalry. If a student in year 7–10 decides not to participate in a grade sport, they can choose recreational sport, which consists of a mix of all sports. Various all-college events are held throughout the year, including the Swimming, Cross Country and Athletics Carnivals, and Gala Days. Blackwattle is on the waterfront, which allows students the opportunity to undertake rowing, dragonboat racing and kayaking as extracurricular activities.

== Notable alumni ==
- Jake Gordon – rugby union player; plays for the Australia national rugby union team, and the NSW Waratahs in Super Rugby Pacific
- Obi Kyei – basketball player
- Renuga Veeran – badminton player; represented Australia at the 2012 Olympics

== See also ==
- List of government schools in New South Wales
- List of selective high schools in New South Wales
