= List of selective high schools in New South Wales =

Below is a list of selective and agricultural high schools run by the NSW Department of Education. Entry to these schools is managed by the department's Selective High School and Opportunity Class Placement Unit. In years before, prospective students sit the Selective High School Test during May when students are in Year 6 (in former years March) and are allocated places at selective schools according to their profile mark, which is out of 300, which comprises both exam and school marks, however there is no more marks being provided to applicants. Students may list up to three preferred selective or agricultural high schools they wish to enter.

A number of other government and non-government high schools also select their students based on merit; these include, for example, creative and performing arts schools, and also some private schools.

== Schools ==
School	Location	Years	Selective status
Alexandria Park Community School	Alexandria	7–12	Partially
Auburn Girls High School	Auburn	7–12	Partially
Baulkham Hills High School	Baulkham Hills	7–12	Fully
Blacktown Boys High School	Blacktown	7–12	Partially
Blacktown Girls High School	Blacktown	7–12	Partially
Bonnyrigg High School	Bonnyrigg	7–12	Partially
Caringbah High School	Caringbah	7–12	Fully
Chatswood High School	Chatswood	7–12	Partially
Conservatorium High School	Sydney central business district	7–12	Fully
Farrer Memorial Agricultural High School	Calala	7–12	Partial- Agricultural
Fort Street High School	Petersham	7–12	Fully
Girraween High School	Girraween	7–12	Fully
Gorokan High School	Gorokan	7–12	Partially
Gosford High School	Gosford	7–12	Fully
Grafton High School	Grafton	7–12	Partially
Granville Boys High School	Granville	7–12	Partially
Hornsby Girls' High School	Hornsby	7–12	Fully
Hurlstone Agricultural High School	Glenfield	7–12	Fully- Agricultural
James Ruse Agricultural High School	Carlingford	7–12	Fully- Agricultural
Karabar High School	Queanbeyan	7–12	Partially
Kooringal High School	Kooringal	7–12	Partially
Macquarie Fields High School	Macquarie Fields	7–12	Partially
Merewether High School	Broadmeadow	7–12	Fully
Moorebank High School	Moorebank	7–12	Partially
Normanhurst Boys High School	Normanhurst	7–12	Fully
North Sydney Boys High School	Crows Nest	7–12	Fully
North Sydney Girls High School	Crows Nest	7–12	Fully
Northern Beaches Secondary College, Manly Selective Campus	North Curl Curl	7–12	Fully
Parramatta High School	Parramatta	7–12	Partially
Peel High School	Tamworth	7–12	Partially
Penrith Selective High School	Penrith	7–12	Fully
Prairiewood High School	Wetherill Park	7–12	Partially
Rose Bay Secondary College	Dover Heights	7–10	Partially
Ryde Secondary College	Ryde	7–12	Partially
Sefton High School	Sefton	7–12	Partially
Smith's Hill High School	Wollongong	7–12	Fully
St George Girls High School	Kogarah	7–12	Fully
Sydney Boys High School	Moore Park	7–12	Fully
Sydney Girls High School	Moore Park	7–12	Fully
Sydney Secondary College Balmain Campus	Rozelle	7–10	Partially
Sydney Secondary College Blackwattle Bay Campus	Glebe	11–12	Partially
Sydney Secondary College Leichhardt Campus	Leichhardt	7–10	Partially
Sydney Technical High School	Bexley	7–12	Fully
Tempe High School	Tempe	7–12	Partially
Aurora College	Western New South Wales	5–12	Fully
Yanco Agricultural High School	Yanco	7–12	Partial- Agricultural

^{1} Previously known as Manly Boys High School (1954–1983) and Manly High School (1983–2002).
^{2} Year of amalgamation of Dover Heights High School and Vaucluse High School.
^{3} Previously known as Malvina High School (1965–2001) and foundation year for selective stream.

== Creative and performing arts high schools ==
The New South Wales Department of Education operates creative and performing arts high schools in communities throughout the state for students who wish to work with creative arts when they grow up. These schools aim to foster excellence in creative arts fields while teaching the same core syllabus as other state-run high schools and are accorded a high degree of autonomy by the department in selecting students and teaching staff. The schools boast specialised facilities and equipment and competition for places is acute.

School	Location	Years
Campbelltown Performing Arts High School	Campbelltown	7–12
Conservatorium High School	Sydney central business district	7–12
Dulwich High School of Visual Arts and Design	Dulwich Hill	7–12
Granville South Creative and Performing Arts High School	Guildford	7–12
Hunter School of the Performing Arts	Broadmeadow	3–12
Northmead Creative and Performing Arts High School	Northmead	7–12
Ku-ring-gai High School	North Turramurra	7–12
Nepean Creative and Performing Arts High School	Penrith	7–12
Newtown High School of the Performing Arts	Newtown	7–12
Wollongong High School of the Performing Arts	Fairy Meadow	7–12

== Sports high schools ==
The New South Wales Department of Education operates seven specialist sports high schools in local communities across New South Wales. Each of the schools deliver a comprehensive education to local students and, by application and, based on merit and talent, students are selected to participate in each school's talented sports program.

School	Location	Years
Endeavour Sports High School	Caringbah	7–12
Hills Sports High School	Seven Hills	7–12
Hunter Sports High School	Gateshead	7–12
Illawarra Sports High School	Berkeley	7–12
Matraville Sports High School	Chifley	7–12
Narrabeen Sports High School	North Narrabeen	7–12
Westfields Sports High School	Fairfield	7–12

== See also ==
- Selective school (New South Wales)
- List of schools in New South Wales
