= Inner West =

Region of Sydney, Australia

Inner West Sydney
- Region
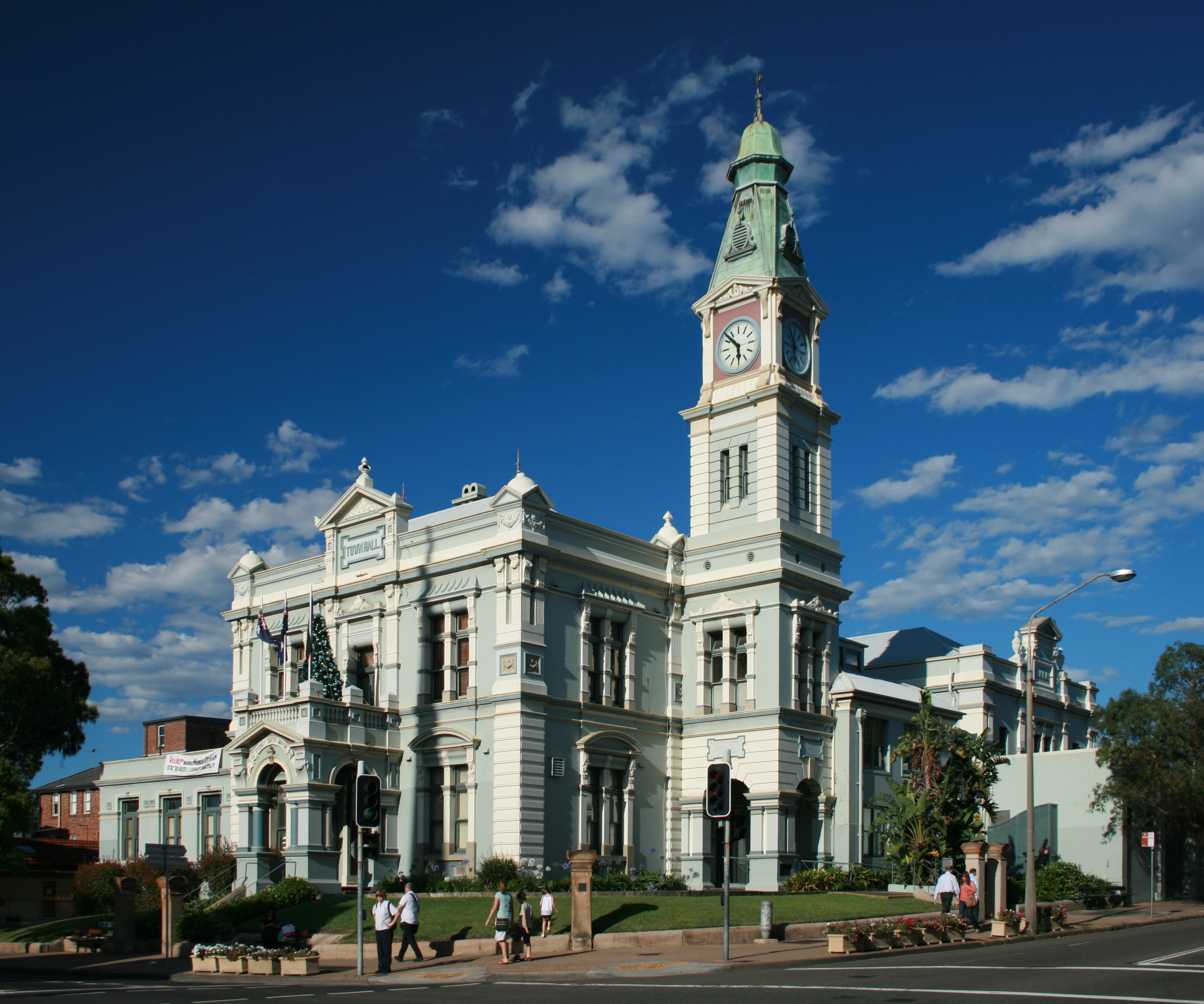
- Leichhardt Town Hall, Leichhardt
- Country: Australia
- State: New South Wales
- City: Sydney
- LGA: Burwood; Canada Bay; Canterbury Bankstown; Inner West Council; Strathfield; Sydney

Government
  - State electorate: Balmain; Canterbury; Drummoyne; Newtown; Strathfield; Summer Hill
  - Federal division: Barton; Grayndler; Reid; Sydney; Watson

Population
  - Total: 304,771 (2021 census)
Regions around Inner West Sydney
Northern Sydney	Northern Sydney (Parramatta River)	North Shore (Sydney Harbour)
Greater Western Sydney	Inner West Sydney	Sydney CBD
South Western Sydney	(Cooks River); Canterbury Bankstown	Sydney Airport

The Inner West of Sydney is an area directly west of the Sydney central business district, New South Wales, Australia. The suburbs that make up the Inner West are predominantly located along the southern shore of Port Jackson (Parramatta River), stretching south to the shores of the Cooks River. The western boundary of the Inner West is approximately the A3 arterial road (Homebush Bay Drive / Centenary Drive), which divides the Inner West from the Greater Western Sydney region. The Inner West is much larger than the Inner West Council local government area. The Inner West roughly corresponds with the Parish of Petersham and Parish of Concord, two cadastral divisions used for land titles.

== Suburbs ==
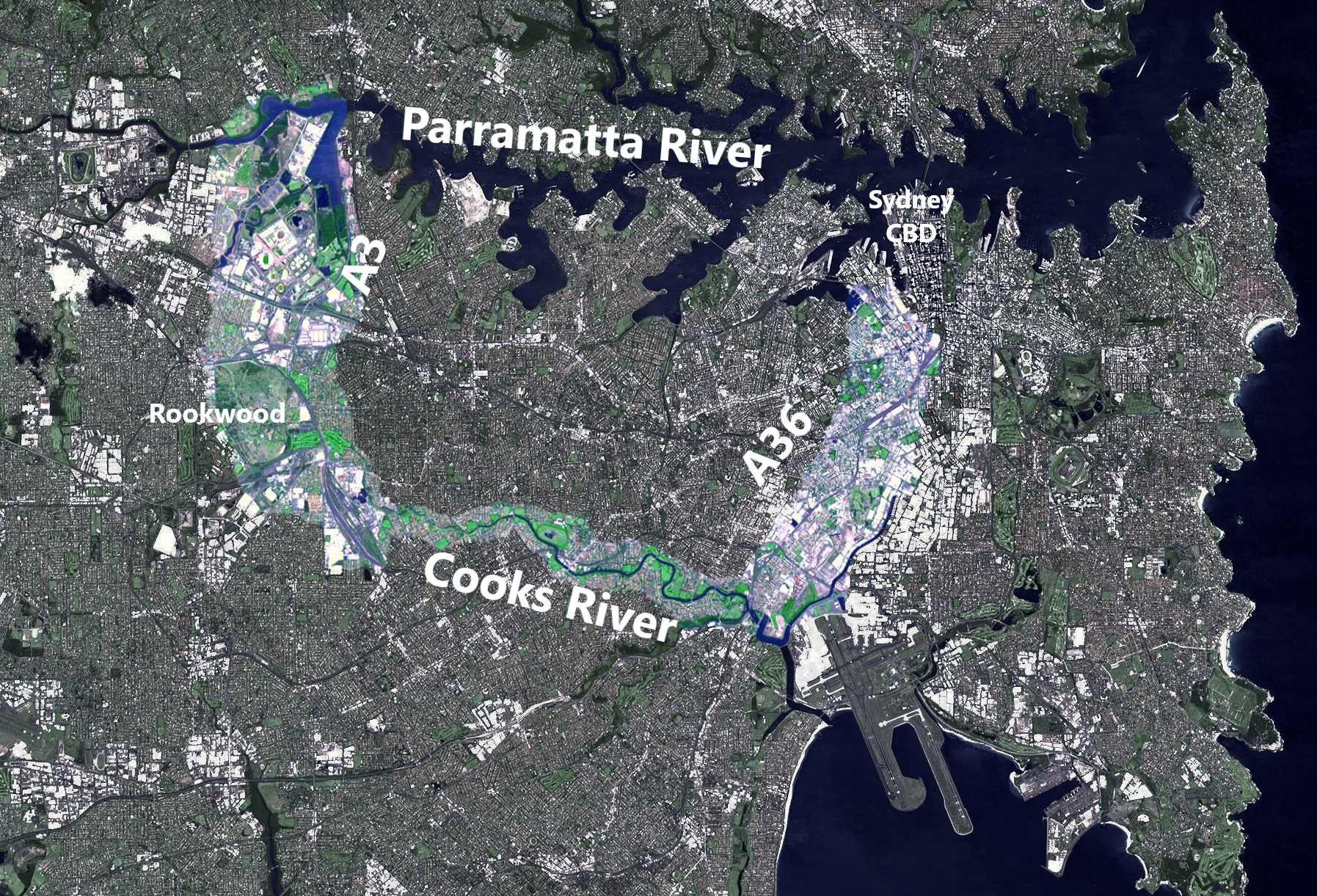
The customary boundary areas of the region mentioned in this section are highlighted in this NASA satellite image of Sydney.

The boundaries of the Inner West region are customary, not administrative or legal, and as such are defined differently in different contexts. The northern and southern boundaries are natural and thus generally well defined: they are the Parramatta River and the Cooks River respectively.

In the west, the upper reaches of the Cooks River flow close to, but do not meet, the Parramatta River, and the western boundary is thus ill-defined. Near the source of the Cooks River and at the point at which the two rivers run closest to each other, a large, uninhabited area stretches between the two rivers, occupied by the Enfield rail yards (now the Enfield Intermodel Logistics Centre), the Chullora rail yards, Rookwood Cemetery, Flemington Maintenance Depot, and former industrial land stretching north to the shores of Homebush Bay, which is now Sydney Olympic Park. This geographical dividing strip has long coincided with council boundaries: the former municipalities of Concord, Homebush and Strathfield lay to its east, while the former municipalities of Rookwood and Bankstown lay to its west. The creek marking the former boundary between Homebush and Rookwood is named "Boundary Creek". Since the new A3 arterial road (Homebush Bay Drive / Centenary Drive) was built along this strip at the end of the 20th century, that road is now often regarded as the more precise boundary line between the Inner West and Greater Western Sydney. Today, council boundaries still largely, though not precisely, follow this line: with small exceptions, the City of Canada Bay and the Municipality of Strathfield lie to its east, while the City of Parramatta, Cumberland Council and the City of Canterbury-Bankstown lies to its west.

The eastern boundary is less well defined, as many suburbs immediately to the west of the Sydney city centre are alternatively regarded as part of the Inner West or as part of the city or "inner city" region. Customarily, either the A36 arterial road (Princes Highway/King Street/City Road) or the local arterial route formed by Sydney Park Road, Mitchell Road, Gibbon Street/Botany Road and Regent Street is often seen as the boundary between the Inner West and the inner city/Eastern Suburbs/inner south region.

The Inner West is alternatively defined as corresponding to the Parish of Petersham and Parish of Concord, two cadastral divisions used for land titles. This largely agrees with the customary definition above, except for some suburbs immediately to the east or west of the cadastral boundaries. For example, the western boundary of the Parish of Concord largely follows the course of Saleyards Creek, which approximates the boundary between Homebush and Flemington. The parish therefore excludes Flemington even though that suburbs lies mostly east of the A3 road. Conversely, the suburb of Rhodes is mostly west of the A3 road but in the Parish of Concord. On the eastern side, Erskineville and Macdonaldtown and Darlington are within the Parish of Petersham, but most of neighbouring Redfern and Alexandria are not.

The Australian Bureau of Statistics also defines a statistical region (Statistical Area Level 4) called "Inner West". This region comprises most of the Municipality of Strathfield, Municipality of Burwood and the City of Canada Bay, as well as the former Municipality of Ashfield and Municipality of Leichhardt (both now part of Inner West Council). This region is mostly a subset of the regions in the two definitions outlined above, excluding the inner western and inner southwestern suburbs such as Glebe, Enmore, Petersham and Marrickville, which are instead in the region called "City and Inner South". As it is based on suburb boundaries, it also includes some small areas that fall outside the definitions outlined above, such as the part of the suburb of Strathfield South that lies south of the Cooks River and the parts of several suburbs that lie west of the A3 road.

Another customary definition of the Inner West is by local government areas. In this customary definition, the Inner West Council, City of Canada Bay, the Municipality of Strathfield and the Municipality of Burwood make up the Inner West. This definition is sometimes used in local government administrative contexts. This definition excludes the innermost suburbs that are within the City of Sydney council area and southern suburbs that are within the City of Canterbury-Bankstown, but includes some suburbs that lie outside the above definitions but are within the Municipality of Strathfield.

Commercial sources, especially in the real estate context, sometimes refer to suburbs that are not in any of the definitions above as being in the Inner West. For example, Beaconsfield is variously considered part of inner city, Eastern Suburbs or inner south Sydney, but is also sometimes referred as part of the Inner West. Likewise, Wentworth Point is part of Greater Western Sydney by any of the above definitions, separated from the Inner West by Sydney Olympic Park and the waters of Homebush Bay, and is normally considered part of that region in administrative contexts, but is sometimes referred to as part of the Inner West.

The contested meaning of the term "Inner West" is itself considered a cultural phenomenon in Sydney: in reference to this, Michael Koziol, the Sydney editor of the Sydney Morning Herald, has written humorously that "the inner west is a state of mind".

Based on the above definitions and the former distribution area of the Inner West Courier local newspaper, the Inner West generally includes the suburbs:

- Abbotsford
- Annandale
- Ashbury
- Ashfield
- Balmain
- Balmain East
- Birchgrove
- Breakfast Point
- Burwood
- Burwood Heights
- Cabarita
- Camperdown
- Canada Bay
- Chiswick
- Concord
- Concord West
- Croydon
- Croydon Park
- Drummoyne
- Dulwich Hill
- Enfield
- Enmore
- Erskineville
- Five Dock
- Flemington
- Forest Lodge
- Glebe
- Haberfield
- Homebush
- Hurlstone Park
- Leichhardt
- Lewisham
- Liberty Grove
- Lilyfield
- Marrickville
- Mortlake
- Newington
- Newtown
- North Strathfield
- Petersham
- Rhodes
- Rodd Point
- Rozelle
- Russell Lea
- St Peters
- Stanmore
- Strathfield
- Strathfield South
- Summer Hill
- Sydenham
- Tempe
- Wareemba

Other suburbs sometimes referred to as being in the Inner West, especially in commercial contexts, include:

- Alexandria
- Beaconsfield
- Belfield
- Campsie
- Canterbury
- Earlwood
- Wentworth Point

== History ==
=== Indigenous land ===
Prior to the arrival of the First Fleet, the Sydney region was home to the Darug people. This nation was broken up into a number of Aboriginal clans who tended to live in a certain geographic area. Each clan contained about 50 to 100 people and, to avoid genetic problems, the men would marry women from other clans. So the clans were interrelated and members from one clan would frequently travel in the territory of others, including to hunt, trade and perform ceremonies. They didn't consider themselves owners of the land, rather custodians.

What is now the Inner West was formerly home to two clans, the Cadigal, whose land stretched along Port Jackson from South Head to Lewisham, and the Wangal, whose land was immediately to the west of the Cadigals and stretched to about Homebush Bay. Other clans that would have been regular visitors to the area would have included the Birrabirragal and Muru-ora-dial in what is now the Eastern Suburbs, the Bediagal and Kameygal from the Cooks River area to the south, the Burramattagal from the Parramatta area to the west, and the Wallumattagal, Cammeraigal and Gorualgal from the northern shores of the Parramatta River.

=== European arrival ===
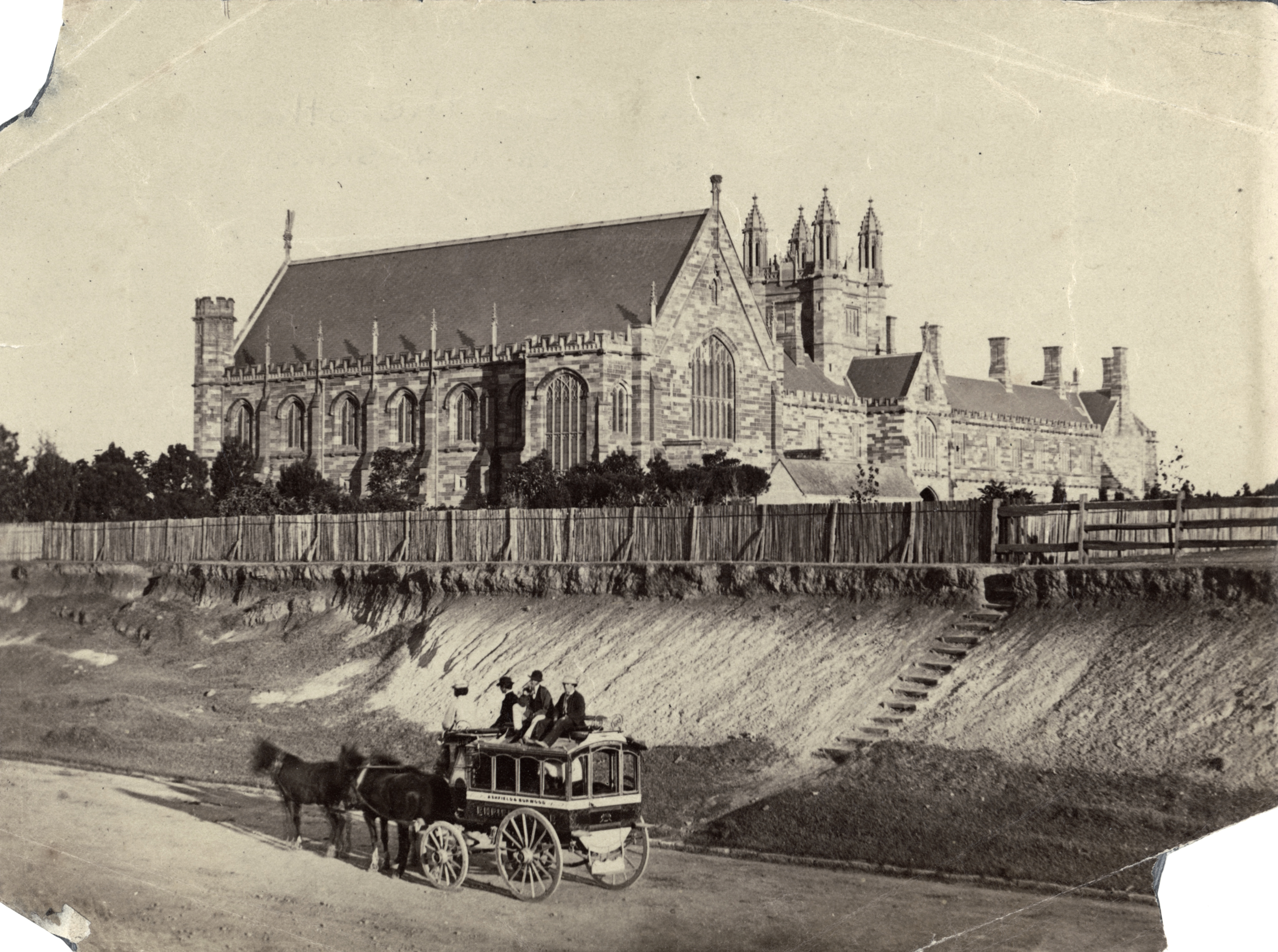
A coach, marked "Ashfield-Burwood", is heading down Parramatta Road towards Sydney in the 1870s (the University of Sydney is in the background).

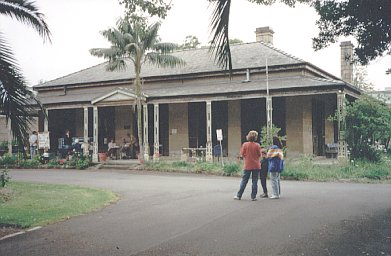
Yasmar, in Haberfield, built in the 1850s.

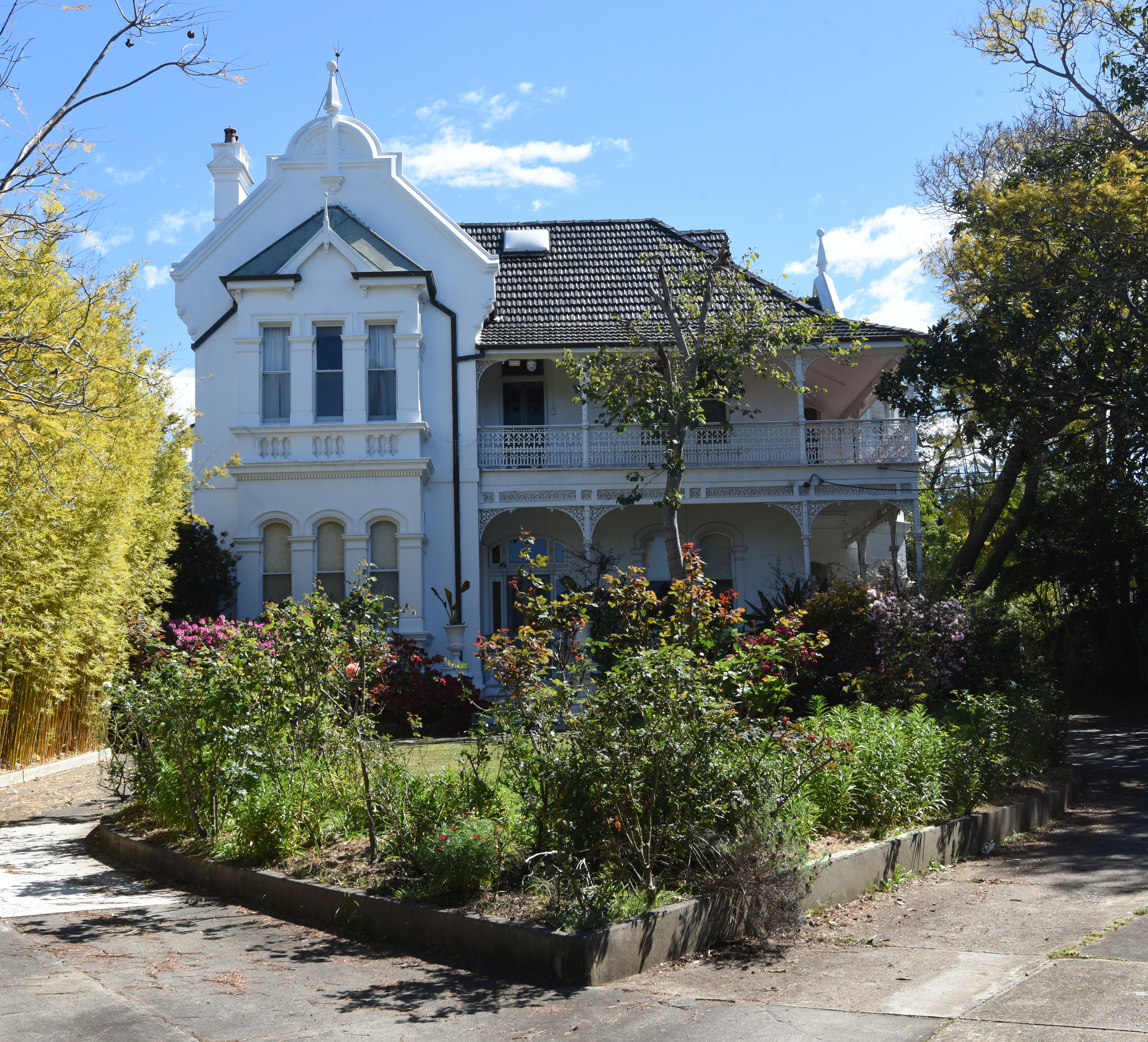
A large house in the Victorian Italiante style in Strathfield, typical of constructions in this area in the late 19th century.

Land grants in the Inner West area began in the late 18th century. By 1814, a stage coach was running between the two major settlements of Sydney (to the east) and Parramatta (to the west), then further west to Richmond. This spurred the development of several settlements along the stage coach route, now Parramatta Road. A number of the large land grants in the area were subdivided for commercial and residential development, such as Ashfield Park in 1838. The construction of the Main Suburban railway line in 1855 spurred further development, especially at the original stations of Newtown, Ashfield, Burwood and Homebush. Many of the original land grants in the area were subdivided for commercial and residential development in the decades following the arrival of the railway, such as the Village of Homebush in 1878. The colony's elite - politicians, judges, industrialists and businessmen - began to build grand homes in the "outer" parts of the Inner West, such as the Arnott family (of the biscuit empire) and the family of David Jones (the retailer), who built various homes in Strathfield.

As a result of population growth, local governments formed in the area in the 19th century, such as the Municipality of Newtown in 1862, the Municipality of Petersham, the Municipality of Leichhardt and the Municipality of Ashfield in 1871, the Municipality of Burwood in 1874, the Municipality of Concord in 1883 and the Municipality of Strathfield in 1885.

During the last quarter of the 19th century, Sydney's tram network expanded into the Inner West, and continued expanding into the early 20th century, eventually serving almost all of the Inner West, as far afield as Cabarita, Enfield and Canterbury.

In 1895, a suburban railway line was built, branching from the Illawarra railway line at Sydenham, which provided access to the railway for suburbs in the south of the Inner West, such as Marrickville and Dulwich Hill.

=== Industrial and residential development ===
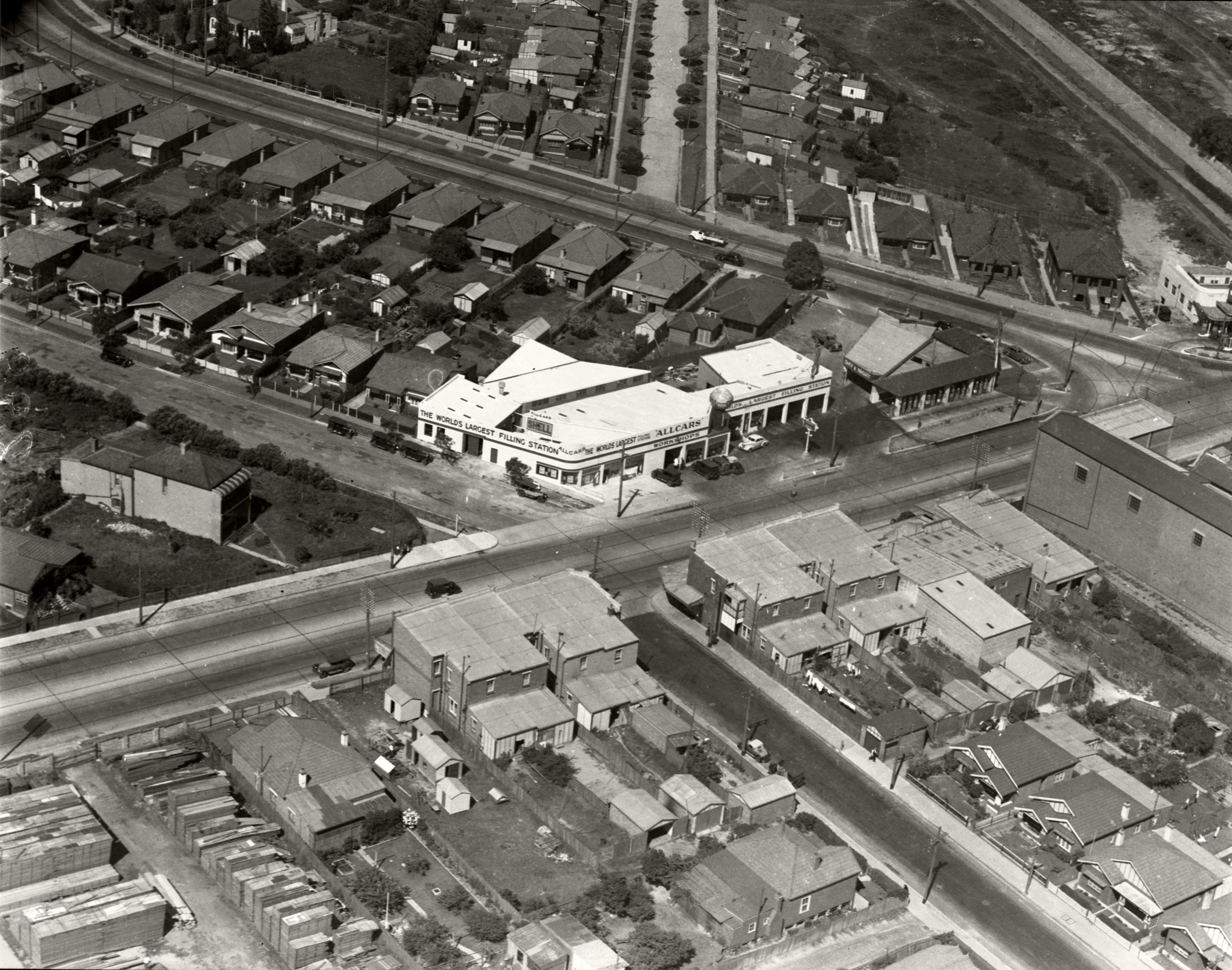
Commercial premises along Parramatta Road and suburban housing in Five Dock, in the 1930s.

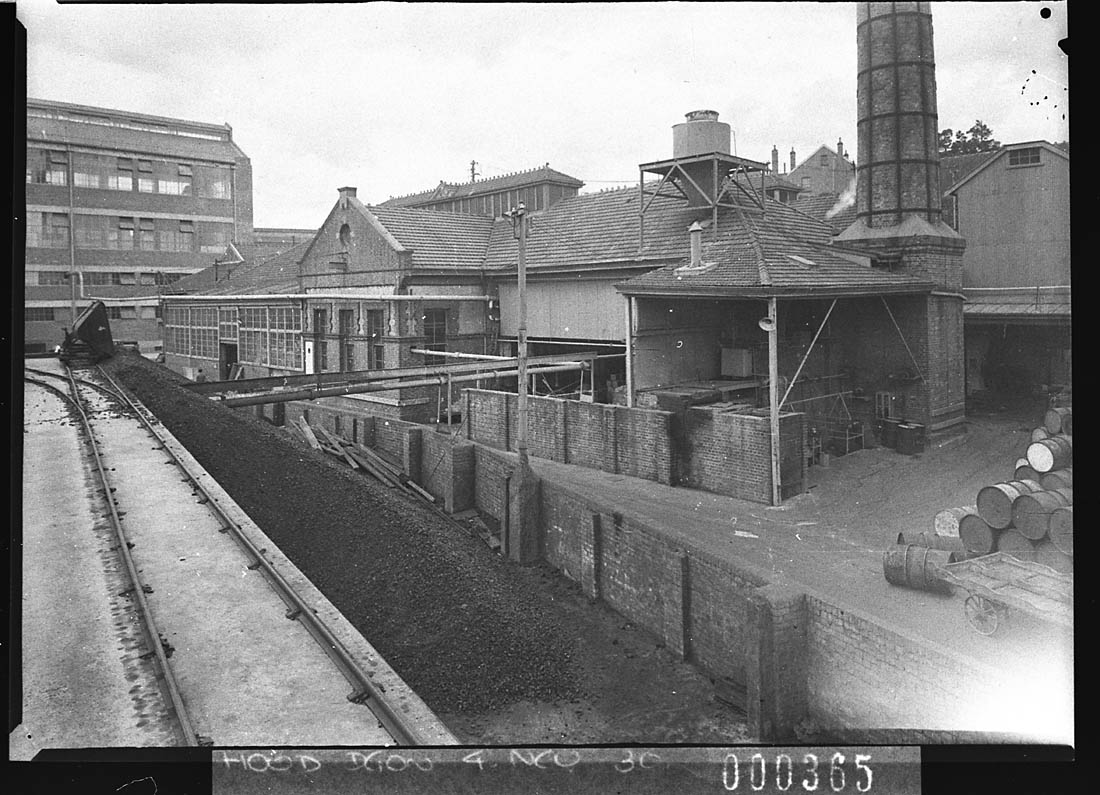
The Lever Brothers factory in Balmain, an example of industrial use of the Inner West waterfront, in 1939.

Due to its central location and easy access by water, rail and road, large scale industrial development occurred in the Inner West in the late 19th and early 20th centuries. A number of large residences were turned to industrial use, such as Arthur Renwick's Abbotsford House, which became Nestlé's chocolate factory, and Roland Ducker's Strathroy in Cabarita, which became the paint factory of British Australian Lead Manufacturers (BALM), later Dulux.

However, the residential suburbs continued to be popular. For example, Australian prime ministers who lived in the Inner West in this period include William McMahon, Earle Page, George Reid, Frank Forde and Billy Hughes. A number of the high quality residential developments in the period immediately after the Federation of Australia are highly regarded ensembles of Australian residential architecture and heritage protected, including the large scale Haberfield "garden suburb" development, which began in 1901, the smaller Malvern Hill Estate in Croydon, which began in 1909, and the Hoskins Estate in Appian Way, Burwood, which began in 1903.

Suburbanisation accelerated in the interwar years, resulting in the outer suburbs of the Inner West, such as Strathfield, Burwood and Concord, growing in prestige while the dense inner suburbs, such as Newtown, Enmore and Erskineville, declined.

=== Post-war migration and gentrification ===
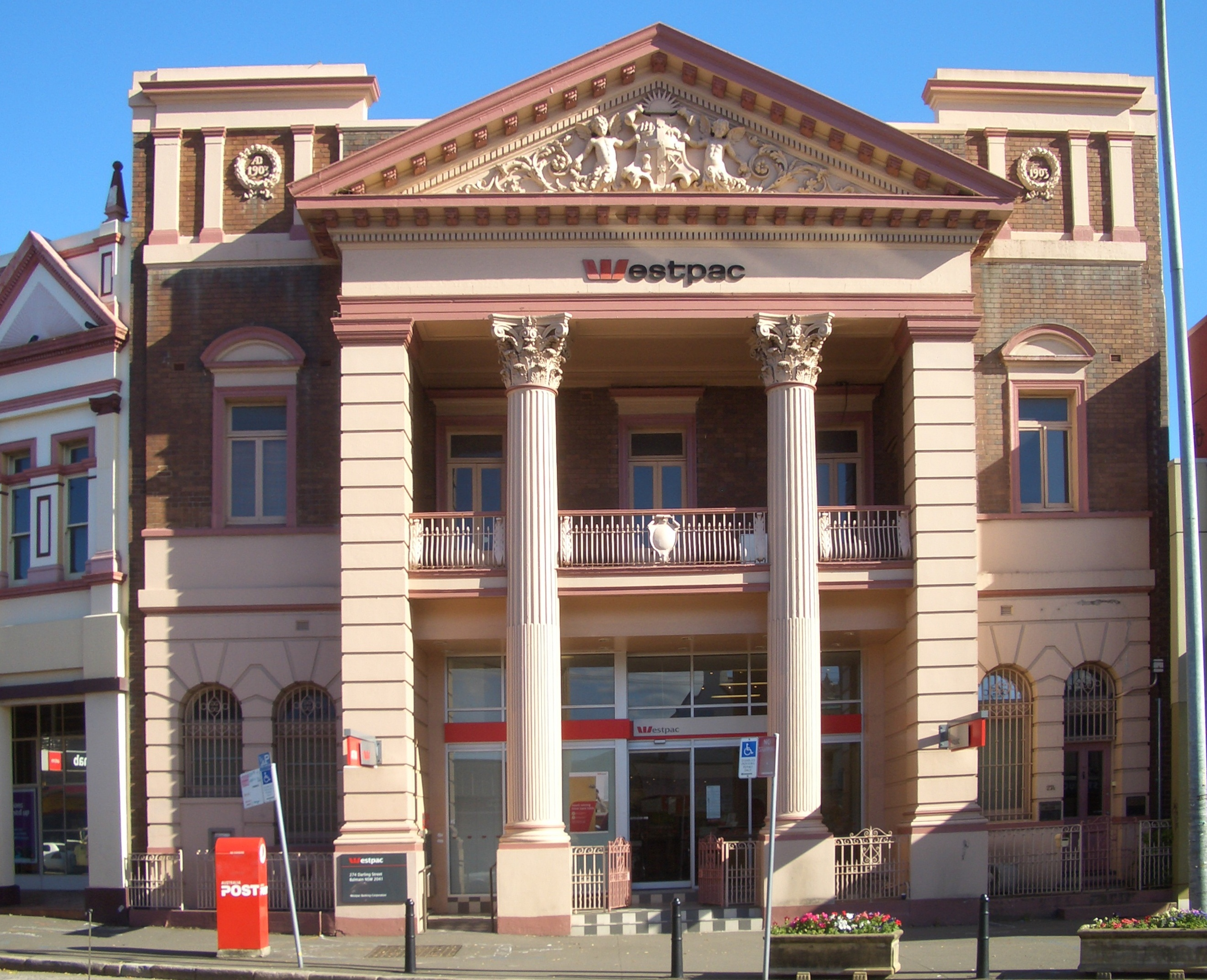
Historic Beaux-Arts bank, Balmain

An influx of migrants to Australia following the end of World War II brought a large number of migrants to the Inner West, primarily from European countries. Many migrants were attracted to the area by the availability of industrial jobs, proximity to the city and the good availability of public transport. The change in demographics also brought ethnically distinct shops, cafes and restaurants, giving a cosmopolitan character to the commercial areas of a number of commercial centres in the Inner West. For example, Haberfield and Leichhardt became distinguished by the concentration of Italian businesses, while Petersham became the hub of Sydney's Portuguese community.

Continued industrial development and the influx of blue collar workers, including European immigrants, accelerated the disparity between suburbs. In 1977, Strathfield was the most expensive suburb in metropolitan Sydney measured by median house price, while inner suburbs of the Inner West, such as Leichhardt, were cheaper than outer Western suburbs such as Bankstown.

The pattern of immigrant settlement continued and radiated further west after the end of the White Australia Policy changed the ethnic makeup of Australia's migrant intake. For example, in the late 20th century, Ashfield became a hub for Chinese immigrants, especially those from Shanghai, known as "Little Shanghai". Burwood has likewise become a hub for Chinese immigrants and overseas students.

Towards the end of the 20th century, the proliferation of alternative cultures in the inner suburbs such as Newtown led to a wave of gentrification.

Along the foreshore and in the outer suburbs of the Inner West, industrial facilities were returned to residential use. The Colgate-Palmolive factory and the Lever Brothers soap factory, both in Balmain, were converted into apartments. Both Abbotsford House and Strathroy House, mentioned above, were restored and returned to residential use, while the factories that were built around them were replaced by upmarket housing developments. Likewise, the flour mills which have long dominated the skyline of Summer Hill was redeveloped for residential use.

Reflecting these changes, by 2017, the spread of highly valued residential suburbs of the Inner West had expanded further east. In that year, the seven suburbs that recorded median house prices exceeding $2 million were, in descending order of median price: Cabarita, Strathfield, Burwood, Chiswick, Balmain East, Rhodes and Burwood Heights, covering both the traditionally popular 'outer' Inner West and the newly gentrified, formerly industrial waterfront suburbs.

== Geography ==
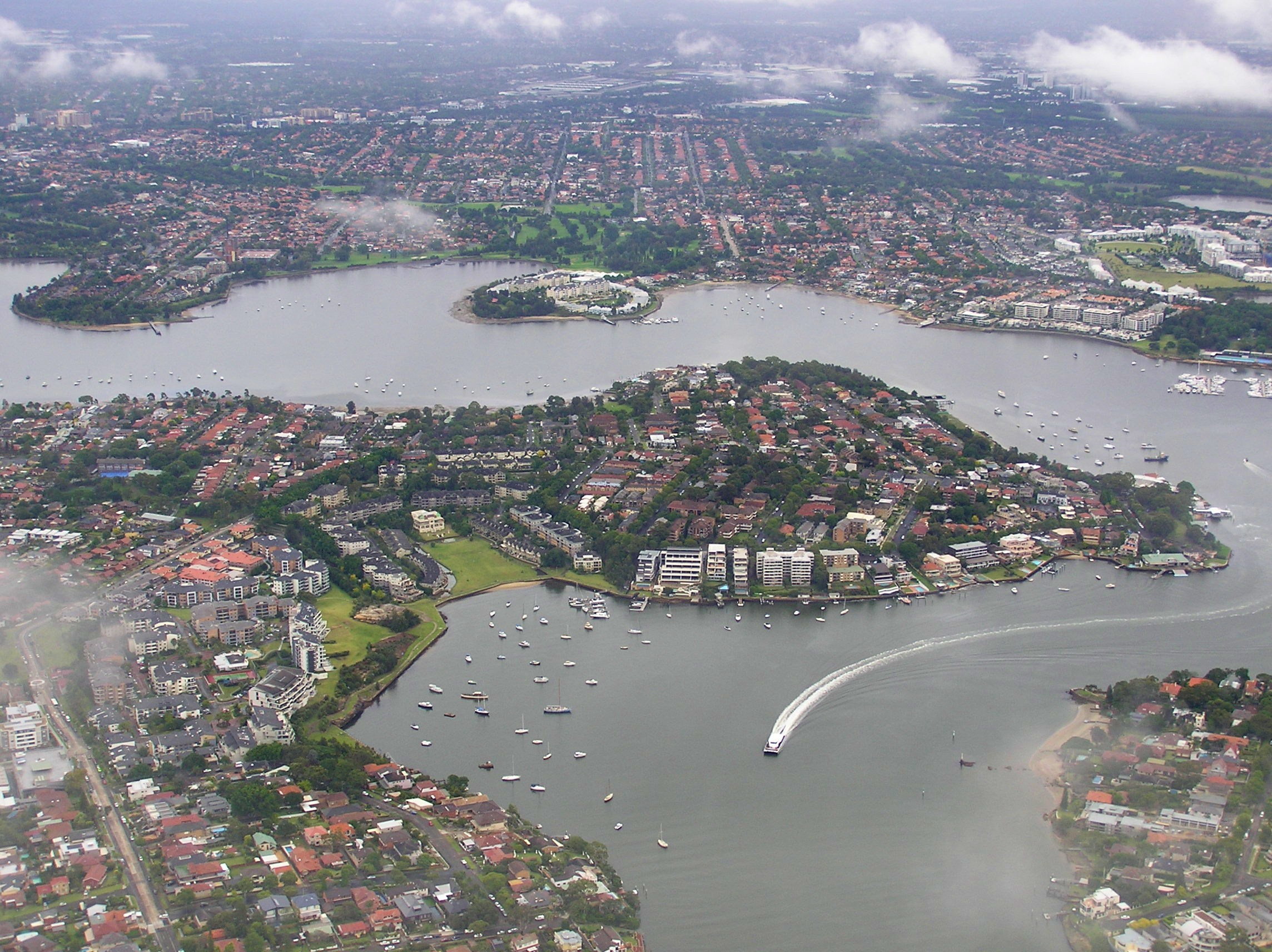
The geography in the northern part of the Inner West is dominated by a series of large bays (Hen and Chicken Bay and Abbotsford Bay pictured) and the peninsulas between them.

The geography of the Inner West is defined by the southern catchments of the Parramatta River, the northern boundary of the region, and the northern catchment of the Cooks River, the southern boundary. The western boundary of the region is near the source of the Cooks River. The Hume Highway approximately follows the ridgeline between the two catchments.

In this region, Parramatta River widens via a series of bays and transitions into the drowned valley that forms Sydney Harbour. This forms a series of large bays along the southern shore, the largest of these being (from west to east) Homebush Bay, Hen and Chicken Bay and Iron Cove. The presence of these bays have had a significant effect on patterns of development in the region and the placement of infrastructure such as roads and railways.

In between the two rivers, the topography is characterised by rolling hills intersected by shallow valleys through which waterways flow to the two rivers, including Iron Cove Creek, Hawthorne Canal (formerly Long Cove Creek), Whites Creek and Johnstons Creek. These waterways have been drastically altered since the late 19th century by the means of concrete lining. In the 1860s iron Cove Creek was a freely flowing waterway which in places broadened into ponds that made excellent and picturesque swimming holes. It is now barely a trickle lined by residential areas, parkland and fast-food restaurants.

== Demographics ==
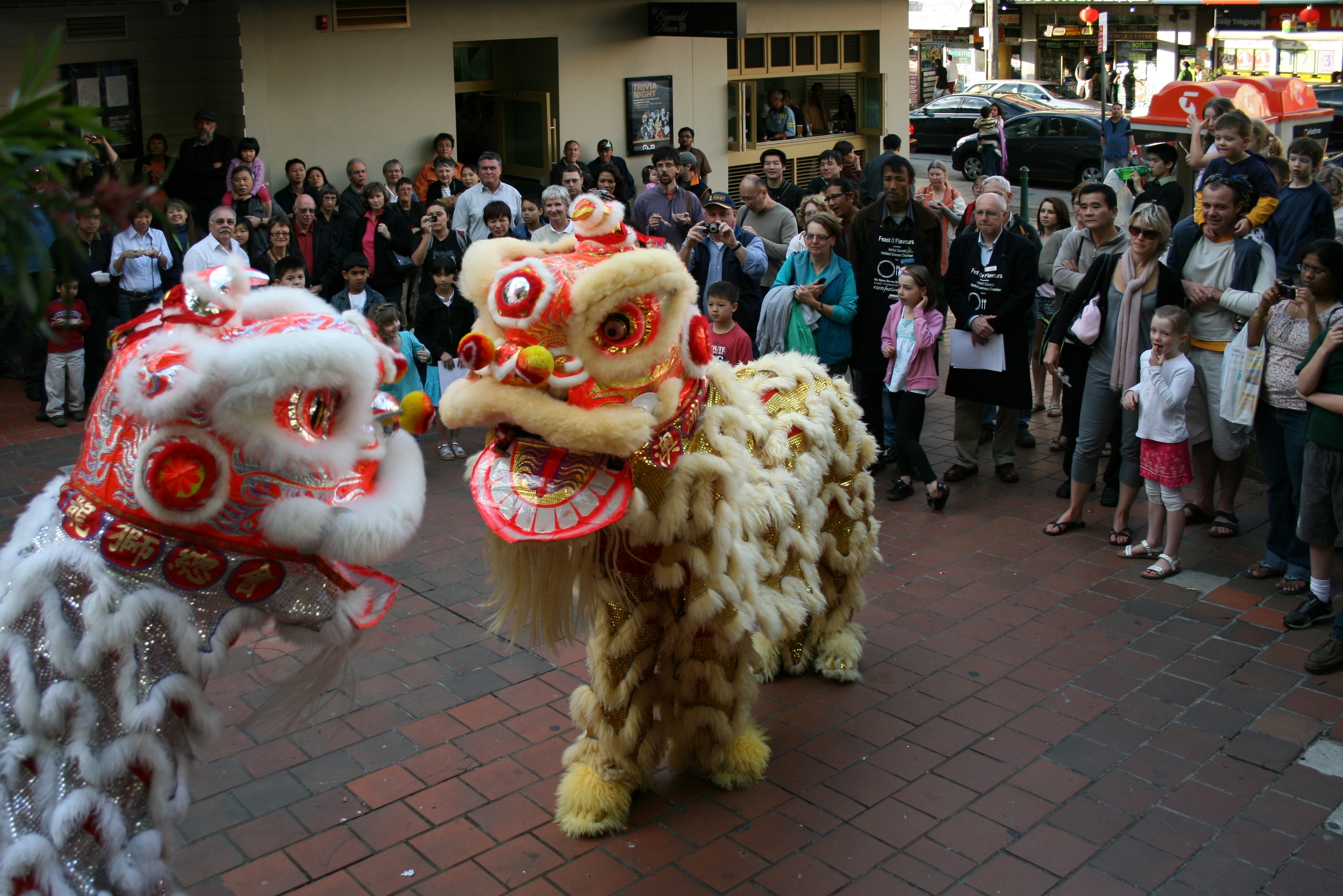
The Inner West is a culturally diverse area. Here, Chinese lion dancing entertains a crowd at Ashfield.

The "Sydney - Inner West" statistical area defined by the Australian Bureau of Statistics covers most of the Inner West by most customary definitions, but not all of it: suburbs in the eastern and southeastern edge of the customary region which are in the City of Sydney and the former Marrickville Council areas, such as Glebe, Enmore, Petersham and Marrickville, are instead in the region called "City and Inner South".

According to the 2021 census, the Sydney - Inner West statistical area had a total population of 304,771 people. The most common reported ancestries were English 20.7%, Australian 17.8%, Chinese 16.5%, Italian 9.5% and Irish 9.2%, with 57.1% of people having both parents born overseas. 52.8% of people were born in Australia. The most common other countries of birth were mainland China 7.9%, India 3.4%, Nepal 3.0%, England 2.8% and Italy 2.4%. 54.1% of people only spoke English at home. Other languages spoken at home included Mandarin 8.6%, Cantonese 4.1%, Italian 3.7%, Nepali 2.9% and Korean 2.5%. The median weekly household income was $2,250, which is higher than the New South Wales median of $1,829 and the Australian median of $1,746.

The table below summarises historical data for the "Sydney - Inner West" statistical area since it was first defined in the 2011 census. Prior to 2011, the "Inner Western Sydney" statistical area covered most of the Inner West, but excluded the former Leichhardt Council, so the data is not directly comparable.

Historical census data for the Sydney - Inner West
Census year		2011	2016	2021
Population	Estimated residents on census night	▲263,560	▲293,301	▲304,771
Population	% of New South Wales population	3.81%	▲3.92%	▼3.78%
Population	% of Australian population	1.23%	▲1.25%	▼1.20%
Cultural and language diversity				
Ancestry, top responses		(% of responses)	(% of responses)	(% of population)
Ancestry, top responses	English	16.6%	▼16.1%	20.7%
Ancestry, top responses	Australian	15.7%	▼13.7%	17.8%
Ancestry, top responses	Chinese	10.3%	▲12.6%	16.5%
Ancestry, top responses	Italian	8.2%	▼7.5%	9.5%
Ancestry, top responses	Irish	7.5%	7.5%	9.2%
Language, top responses (other than English)	Mandarin	5.9%	▲9.0%	▼8.6%
Language, top responses (other than English)	Cantonese	4.3%	▼4.2%	▼4.1%
Language, top responses (other than English)	Italian	5.7%	▼4.6%	▼3.7%
Language, top responses (other than English)	Nepali	-	-	2.9%
Language, top responses (other than English)	Korean	2.9%	▲3.1%	▼2.5%
Language, top responses (other than English)	Greek	2.7%	▼2.3%	▼ -
Religious affiliation				
Religious affiliation, top responses	No religion, so described	23.6%	▲31.7%	▲37.2%
Religious affiliation, top responses	Catholic	31.9%	▼27.4%	▼25.8%
Religious affiliation, top responses	Hinduism	4.5%	▲5.4%	▲6.5%
Religious affiliation, top responses	Anglicanism	9.6%	▼6.9%	▼5.7%
Religious affiliation, top responses	Not stated	n/c	9.4%	▼5.6%
Religious affiliation, top responses	Eastern Orthodox	4.5%	▼ -	-
Median weekly incomes				
Personal income	Median weekly personal income	A$723	A$828	A$1,032
Personal income	% of Australian median income	125.3%	125.1%	128.2%
Family income	Median weekly family income	A$1,985	A$2,284	A$2,757
Family income	% of Australian median income	134.0%	131.6%	130.0%
Household income	Median weekly household income	A$1,662	A$1,964	A$2,250
Household income	% of Australian median income	134.7%	136.6%	128.9%

== Housing ==
The housing stock within the Inner West reflects the distinct waves of development in its history. The inner-most suburbs of the Inner West were developed early in the life of the colony, and preserve stone houses from the Victorian era and earlier. The inner suburbs of the Inner West were largely subdivided in the 19th century for suburban development, and a large number of two-storey terraced houses and one-storey terraced and timber cottages survive in suburbs such as Glebe, Newtown and Annandale. Further away from the city, a large number of grand houses of the Victorian era are still standing, though many have been subdivided or are no longer in residential use. After these suburbs were subdivided around the turn of the 20th century, Federation architecture dominated the style of suburban houses, simplifying over time to the Australian Californian bungalow style which is still found throughout most of the inner west. While many of the older houses have been replaced by new constructions, a number of areas have retained contiguous areas of housing stock from the early 20th century or earlier, and a number of heritage conservation zones have been created to preserve the character of these areas.

During the 20th century, low- to medium-rise apartment blocks began to proliferate, especially along the railway line. These have in turn been succeeded by the construction of medium- to high-rise apartment blocks in the late 20th century, especially around major stations such as Strathfield and Burwood, and in the redevelopment of formerly industrial land throughout the region and especially along the Parramatta River waterfront. Nevertheless, government planning controls seek to preserve the low-density residential land use throughout much of the Inner West.

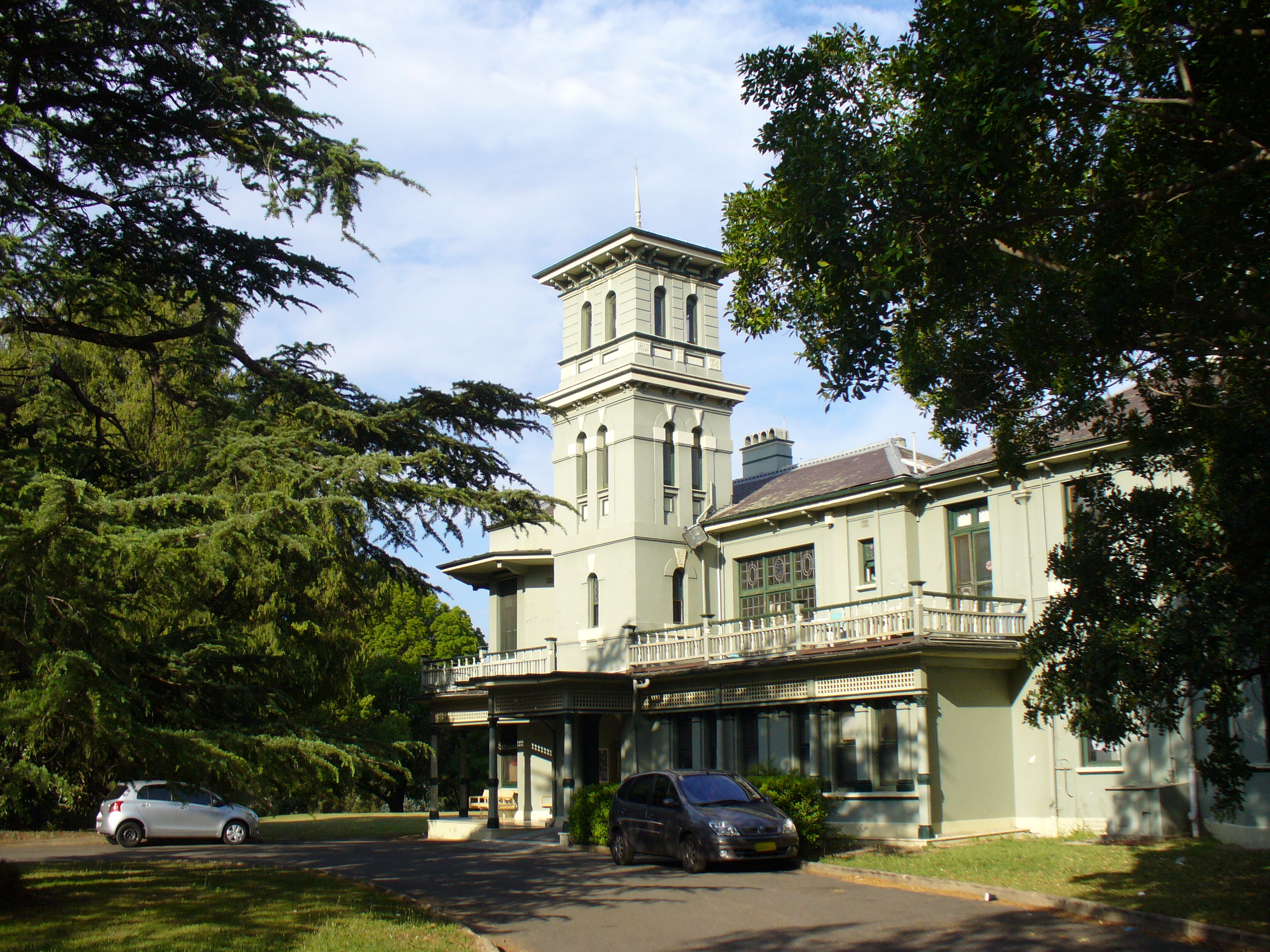
Yaralla, in Concord West, built in the 1860s.

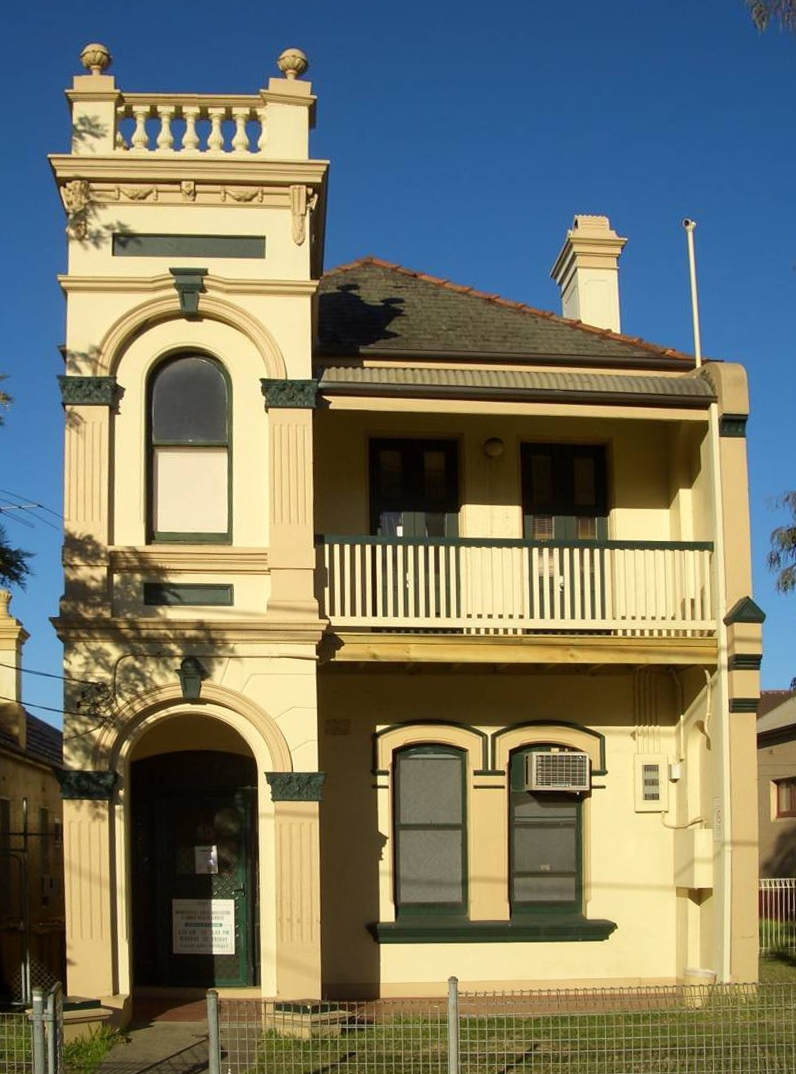
A Victorian-style house in Marrickville.

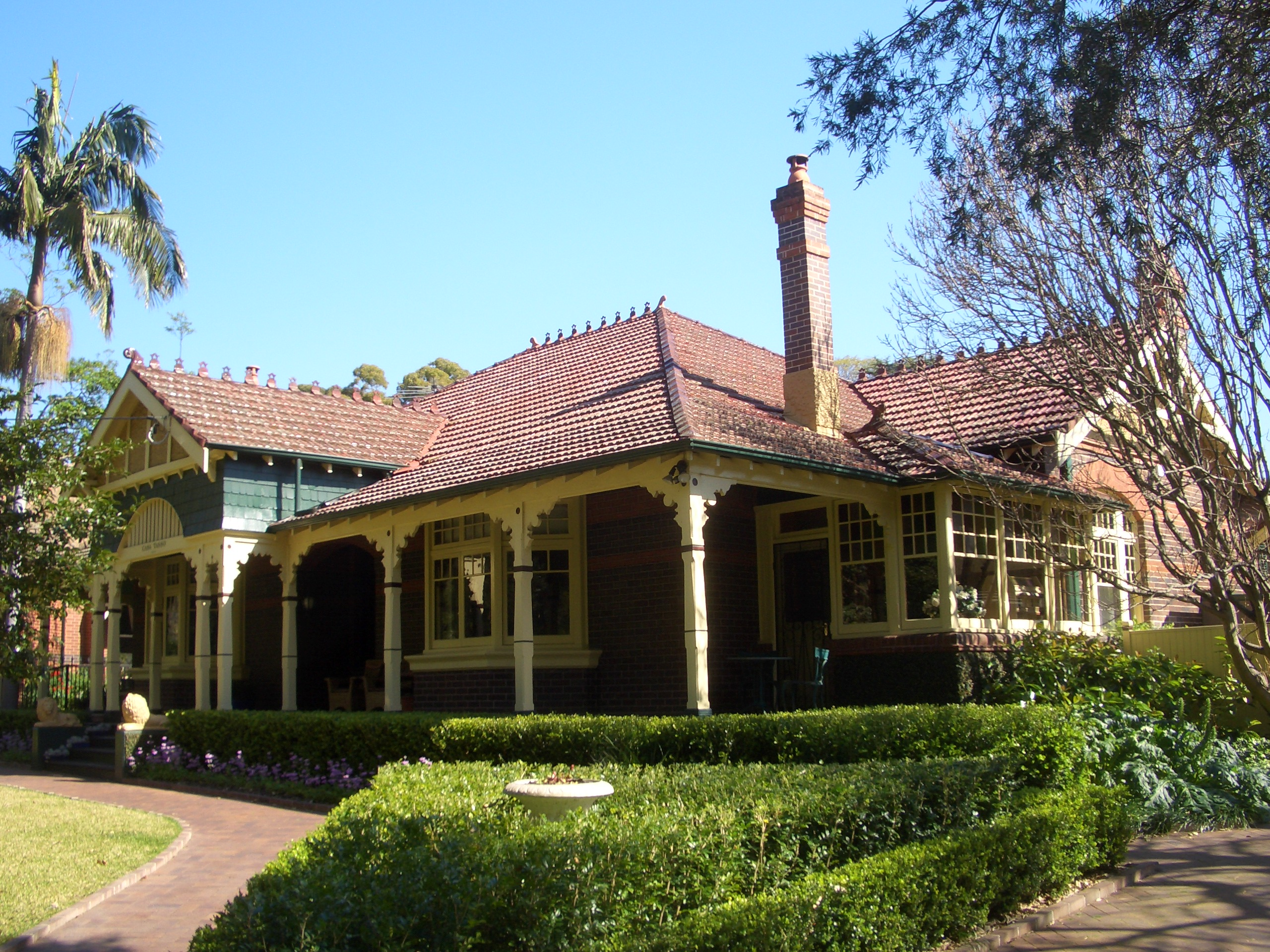
Cassa Tasso, an example of Federation-era suburban residential architecture in the Hoskins Estate on Appian Way, Burwood.

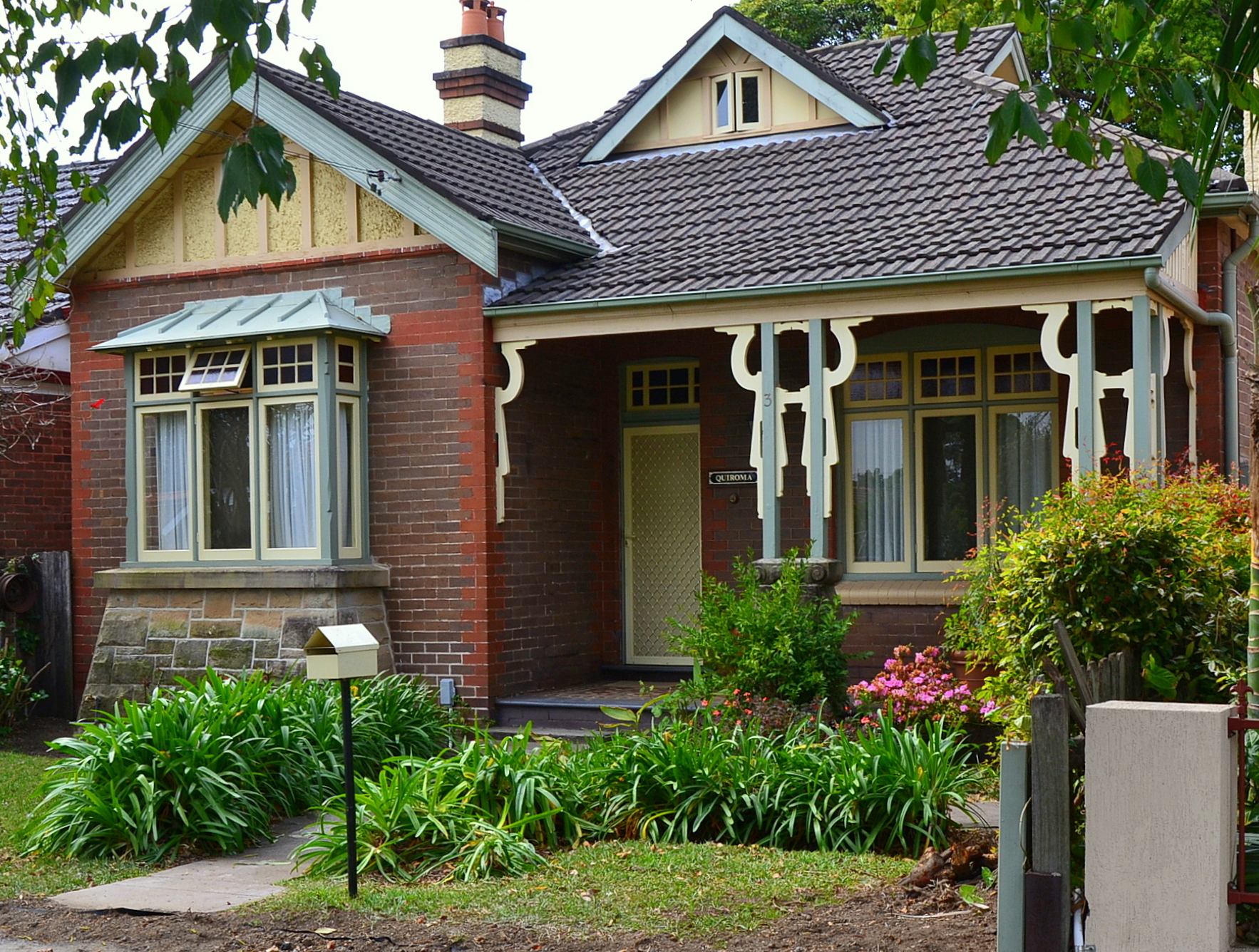
Federation bungalow house in Ashfield.

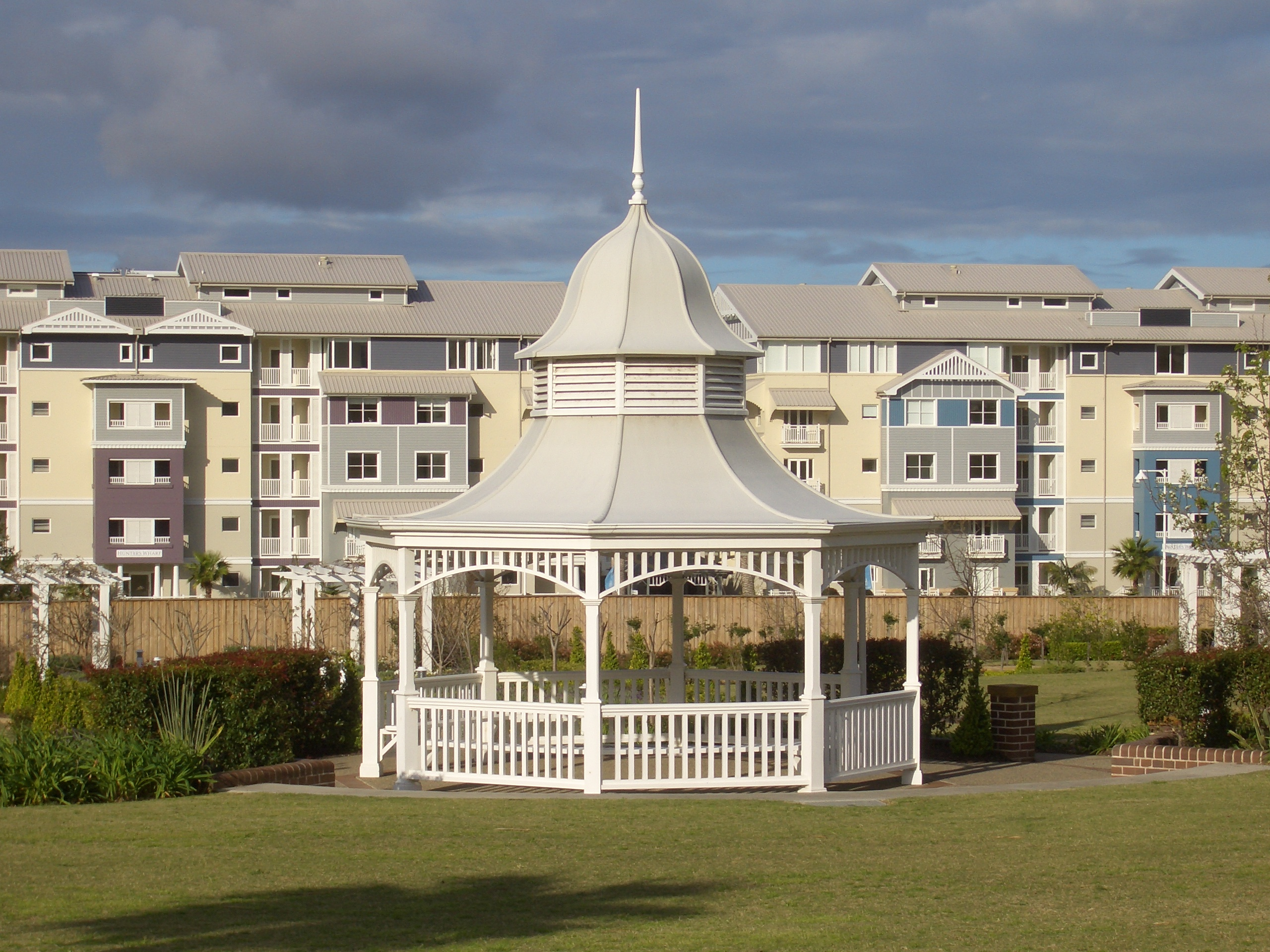
Breakfast Point, a large scale development on former industrial land.

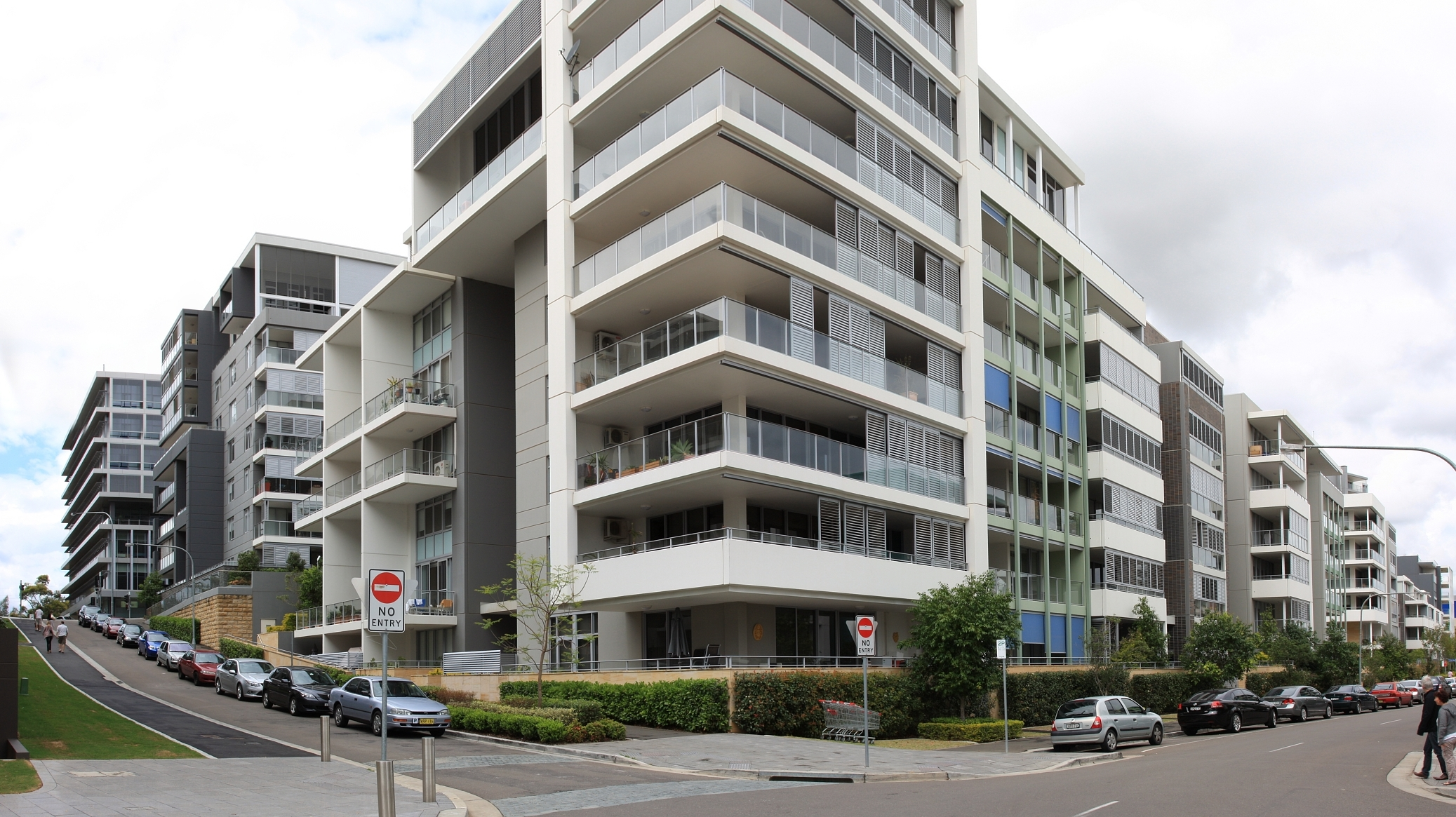
Contemporary style apartment developments in Rhodes.

== Schools ==
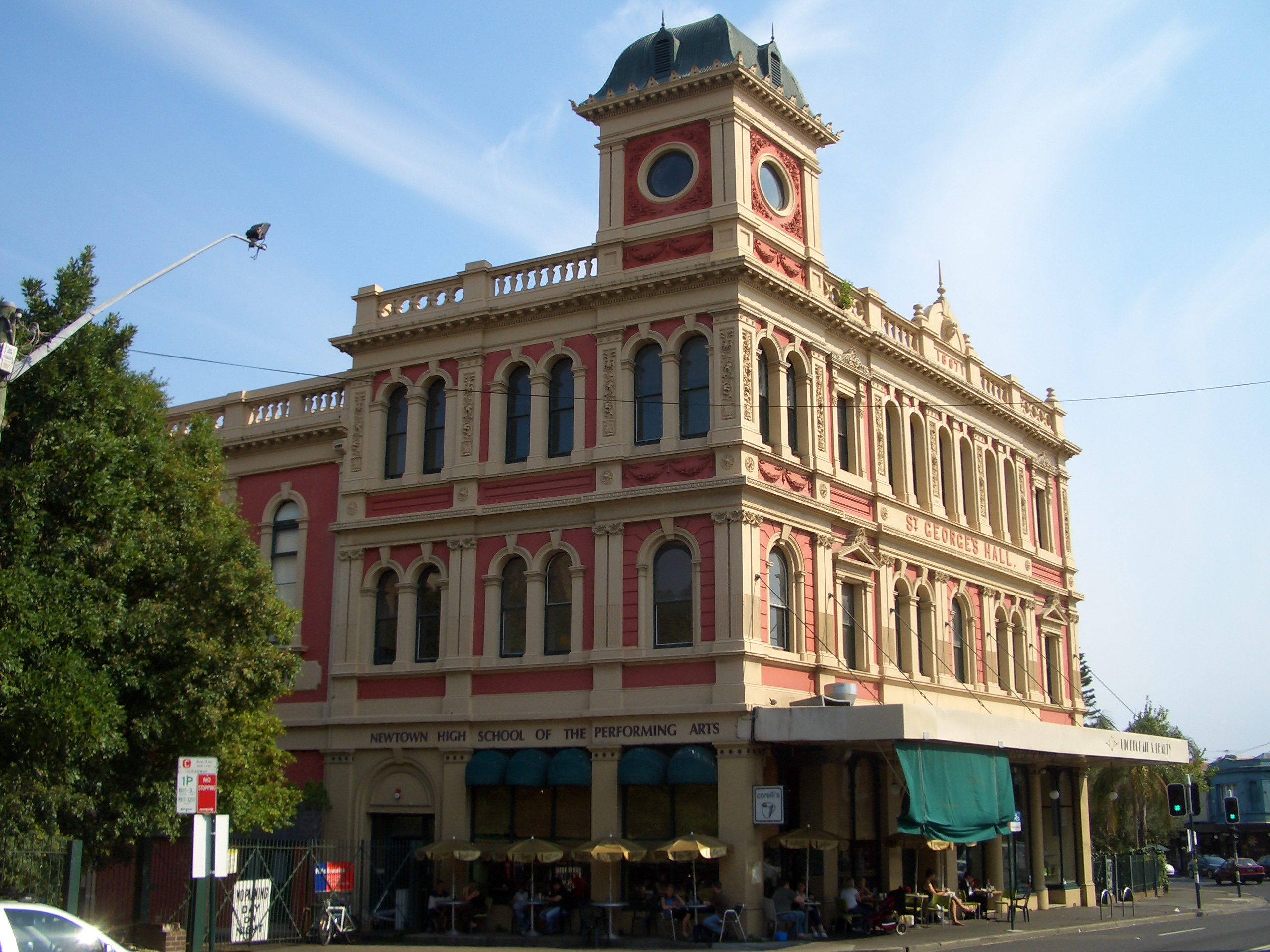
School of the Arts, Newtown

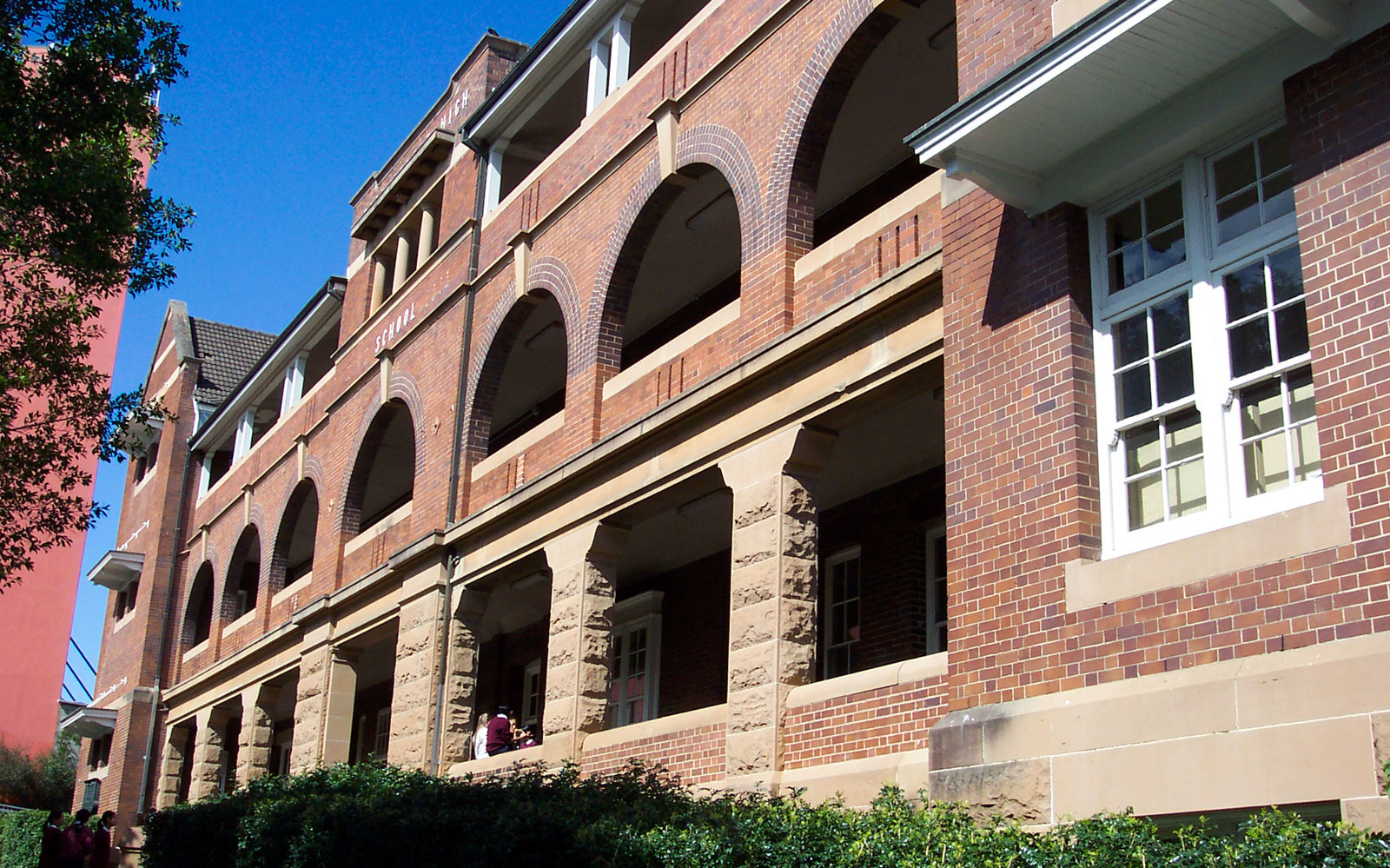
Fort Street High School, Petersham

The Inner West is the location of several tertiary institutions such as the University of Sydney at the eastern end in Camperdown, and a major campus of the Australian Catholic University and the Catholic Institute of Sydney at the western end in Strathfield. A relatively high proportion of the population consists of tertiary students, both in the areas around these institutions, and in the suburbs further away that are well connected to educational institutions by public transport.

The Inner West has a high concentration of public and private secondary schools, many of which were established in the 19th century. Government high schools located in the Inner West include the selective secondary schools Fort Street High School and Sydney Secondary College, and the public comprehensive high schools Ashfield Boys High School, Burwood Girls High School, Concord High School (Sydney), Homebush Boys High School and Strathfield Girls High School, and the specialist high school Newtown High School of the Performing Arts. Alexandria Park Community School is a government school with both a selective stream and a comprehensive stream. Private schools in the Inner West include the Presbyterian Ladies' College in Croydon, Meriden School, St. Patrick's College and Santa Sabina College all in Strathfield, MLC School in Burwood, Trinity Grammar School in Summer Hill (preparatory school in Strathfield), Newington College in Stanmore, Rosebank College in Five Dock and The McDonald College in North Strathfield.

== Transport ==
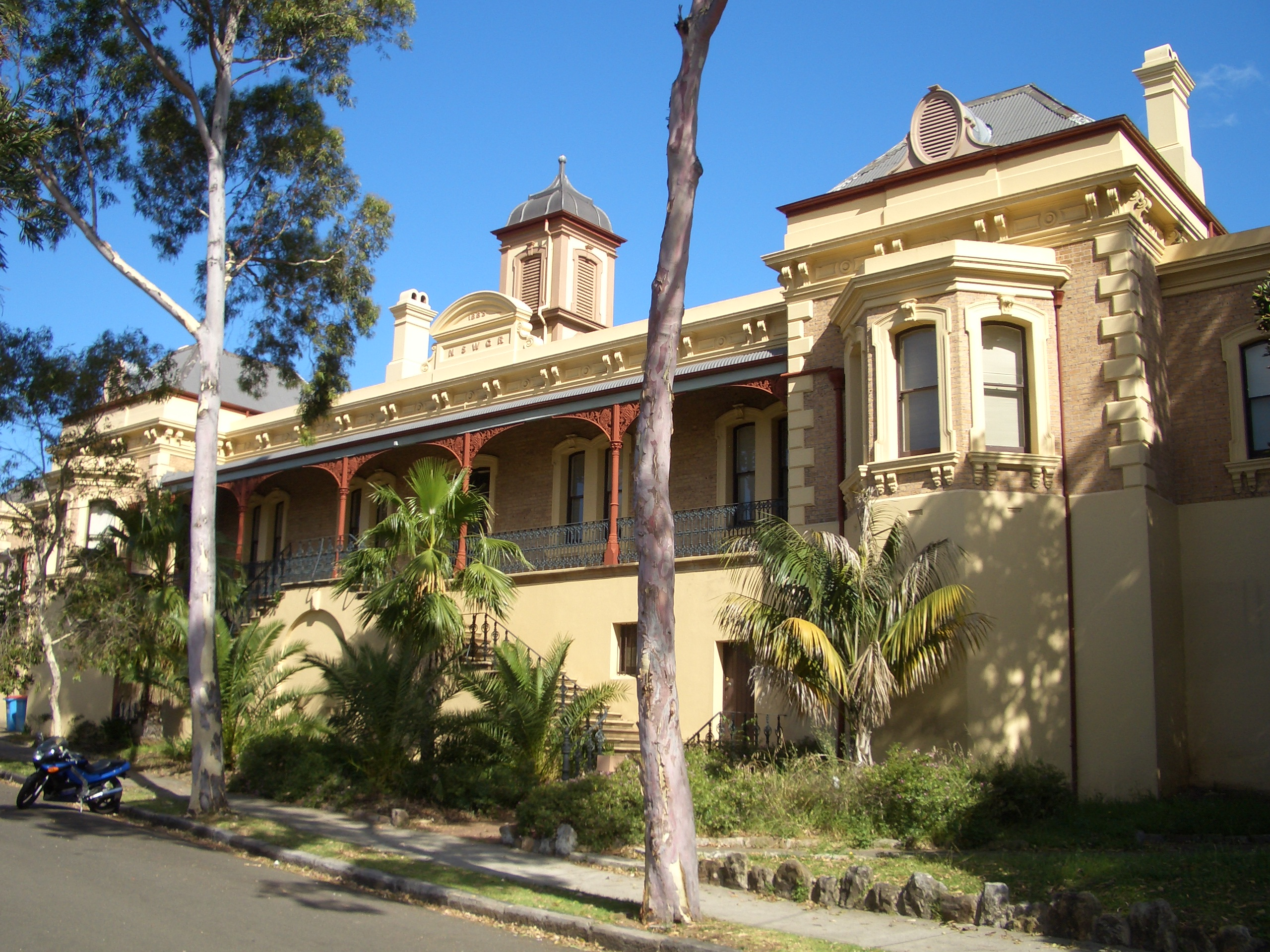
Petersham railway station

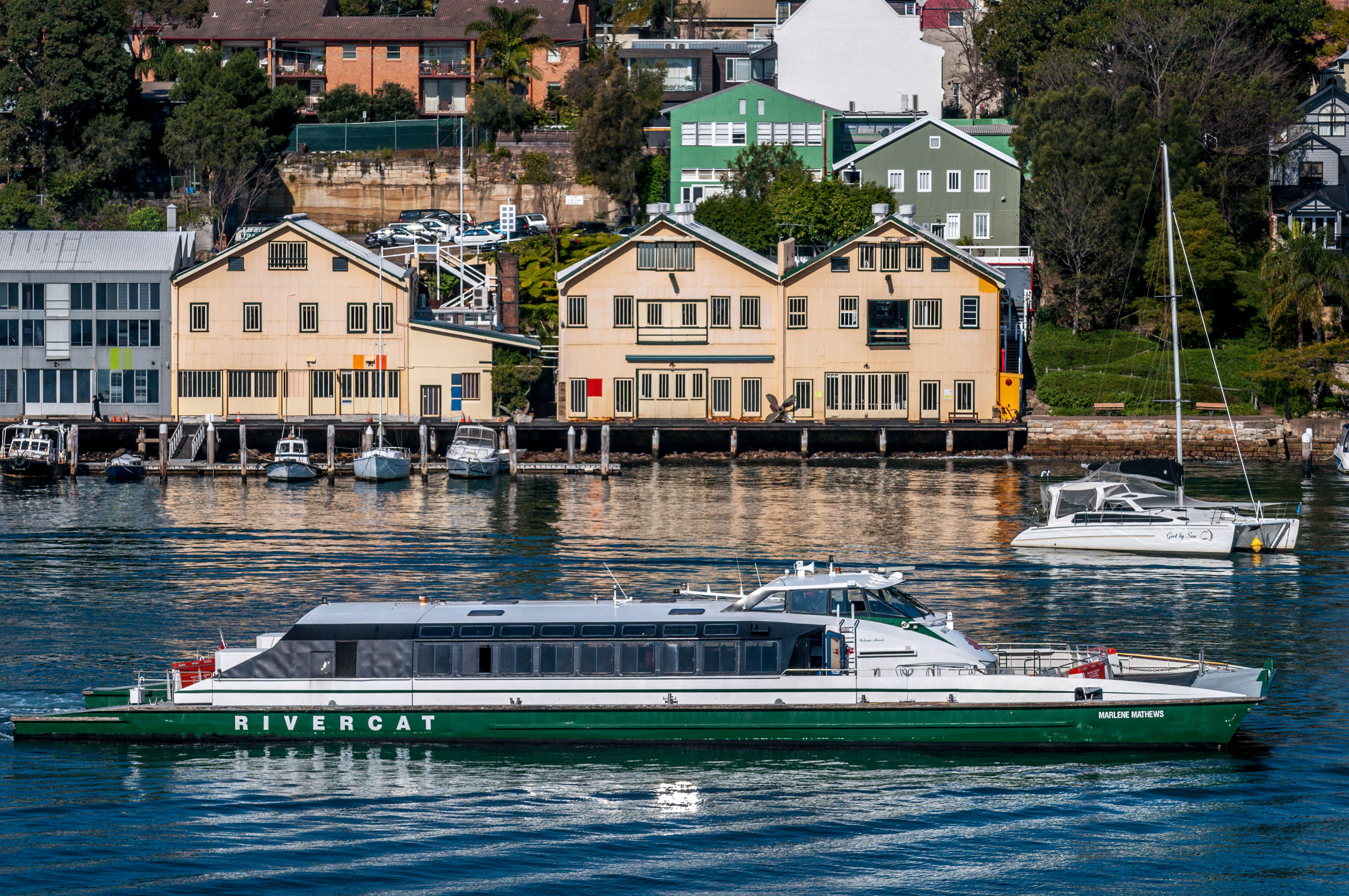
Sydney Ferries RiverCat services connect the waterfront suburbs of the Inner West with Parramatta, northern Sydney and the Sydney CBD.

Public transport in the region includes trains, buses, ferries and light rail.

The Inner West is bisected by the Main Suburban railway line, the main trunk of the Sydney Trains network. BMT, CCN, T1, T2, T3 and T9 services operate along this railway line, though many only serve limited stops. To the east, these services provide access to Central and the Sydney CBD, while to the west of Strathfield they progressively branch out into Northern Sydney, Western Sydney and beyond.

The Illawarra railway line, used by Sydney Trains SCO, T4 and T8 services to the Illawarra and Southern Sydney, passes through the southeastern part of the Inner West, with stations at Erskineville, St Peters and Sydenham. Connecting to the Illawarra railway line at Sydenham is the Bankstown railway line, which heads westward through the southern part of the Inner West as far as Canterbury before crossing the Cooks River. This section of the Bankstown railway line has been temporarily closed since September 2024 for conversion works to enable Sydney Metro M1 services to operate over it.

The Sydney Metro West rapid transit rail line is under construction. When completed, it will provide a further connection for suburbs in the north of the Inner West, to Sydney CBD in the east, and to Sydney Olympic Park and Parramatta in the west.

There are various bus routes provided largely operated by Transit Systems.

Sydney Ferries operates services in the inner harbour and Parramatta River, with a number of wharves serving suburbs in the northern part of the Inner West. The Sydney RiverCat services in particular are designed to navigate the relatively shallow waterways on the Parramatta River route, connecting the Inner West with northern Sydney across the river, Parramatta in the west, and the Sydney CBD in the east.

The Inner West Light Rail connects Central to the Inner West via Pyrmont, with stops in Glebe, Lilyfield, Leichhardt, Lewisham and Dulwich Hill, an interchange with the Bankstown railway line.

Parramatta Road is a major arterial road that runs through the middle of the Inner West, connecting it with the major centres of Sydney City in the east and Parramatta in the west. At Summer Hill, Liverpool Road (the Hume Highway) branches from Parramatta Road and proceeds in a southwesterly direction towards Melbourne. The M4 road largely runs as a motorway tunnel under the Inner West, partly parallel to Parramatta Road. The M4 tunnel has a major junction near Haberfield, with one branch joining the surface road Parramatta Road, another joining the A4 surface road towards the Sydney CBD, and a third branch continuing east as a tunnel under the northern and eastern portion of the Inner West to connect with Anzac Bridge and the M8 motorway via the Rozelle Interchange. Ongoing projects will eventually extend the tunnel further north to connect to the future Western Harbour Tunnel, and south to provide a direct connection to Sydney Airport.

Although still playing only a small part in the overall transport task, use of bicycles for transport has increased significantly in the Inner West since the 1990s. Denser populations and shorter distances mean cycling is often quicker and more convenient than driving or taking public transport. A network of bicycle paths, signed bicycle routes on local streets and other aids to safe and convenient cycling is developing. Main bicycle routes include two north–south routes: one located in the western part of the Inner West called the Cooks River cycleway or "Bay to Bay" cycleway, which connects Ryde to the north with the Cooks River valley and Botany Bay to the southeast, and another located further east called the GreenWay which connects Iron Cove in the north to the Cooks River valley where it joins the Cooks River cycleway, an east–west route from Five Dock to the Anzac Bridge cycleway, a northwest route from Gladesville Bridge to Anzac Bridge, and a southwest route from Marrickville to the city via Newtown. Groups of local bicycle user groups provide help for new cyclists, under the parent banner of Bicycle New South Wales.

== Government ==
In the state parliament, the region is represented by the electoral districts of Balmain, Canterbury, Drummoyne, Newtown, Strathfield and Summer Hill. The split of these seats amongst the three largest parties has been relatively consistent. Since 2015, when the Australian Labor Party regained Strathfield from the Liberal Party of Australia, and Summer Hill and Newtown were contested for the first time, the split has remained the same, with Drummoyne represented by the Liberal Party, Canterbury, Strathfield and Summer Hill represented by the Australian Labor Party, and Balmain and Newtown represented by The Greens.

In the federal parliament, the area is represented by the electorate of Grayndler and part of the electorates of Reid (which also covers a small part of Greater Western Sydney), Sydney (which also covers the city centre) and Watson (which also encompasses a substantial section of the Canterbury-Bankstown area). All four federal seats have been held by the Australian Labor Party since the 2022 federal election, when the Labor Party won the division of Reid from the Liberal Party which had held it since 2013.

=== Local Government areas ===
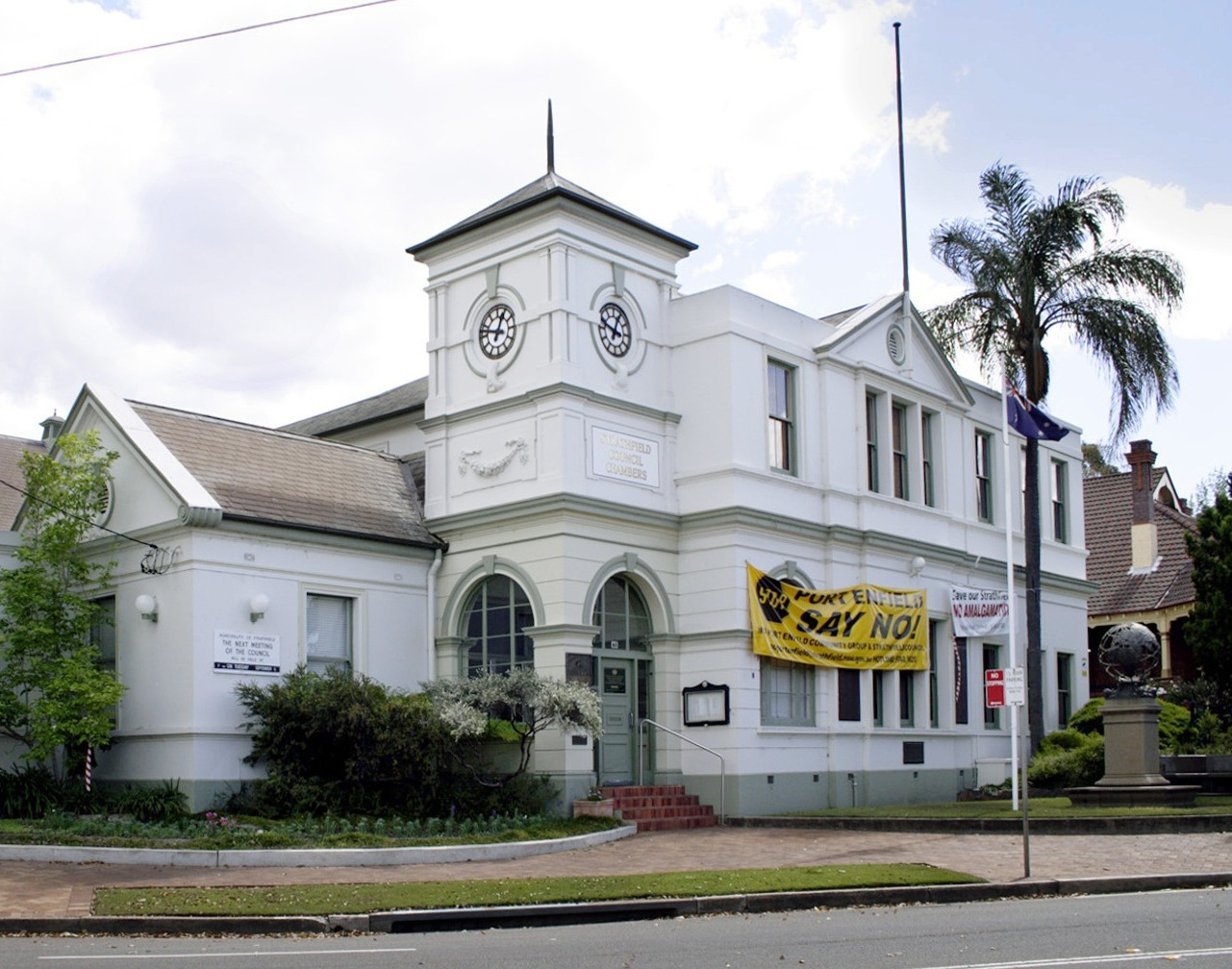
Strathfield Town Hall, seat of the Municipality of Strathfield, one of the local government areas in the Inner West

The four local government areas of the Municipality of Burwood, City of Canada Bay, Inner West Council and Municipality of Strathfield are sometimes referred to in local government contexts as the "Inner West local government areas".

Prior to the amalgamation of Marrickville, Leichardt and Ashfield Councils into Inner West Council, Marrickville Council was often excluded from official definitions of the "Inner West" region. As a result, a number of government sources that use definitions of the "Inner West" based on the earlier council boundaries include the councils listed above, but exclude the Marrickville Council area. These include the definition used by the Australian Government Bureau of Statistics, and the New South Wales Government Department of Planning and Infrastructure, and local media.

The northeastern part of the City of Canterbury-Bankstown and the western part of the City of Sydney are also often included in the Inner West region.

=== Health services ===
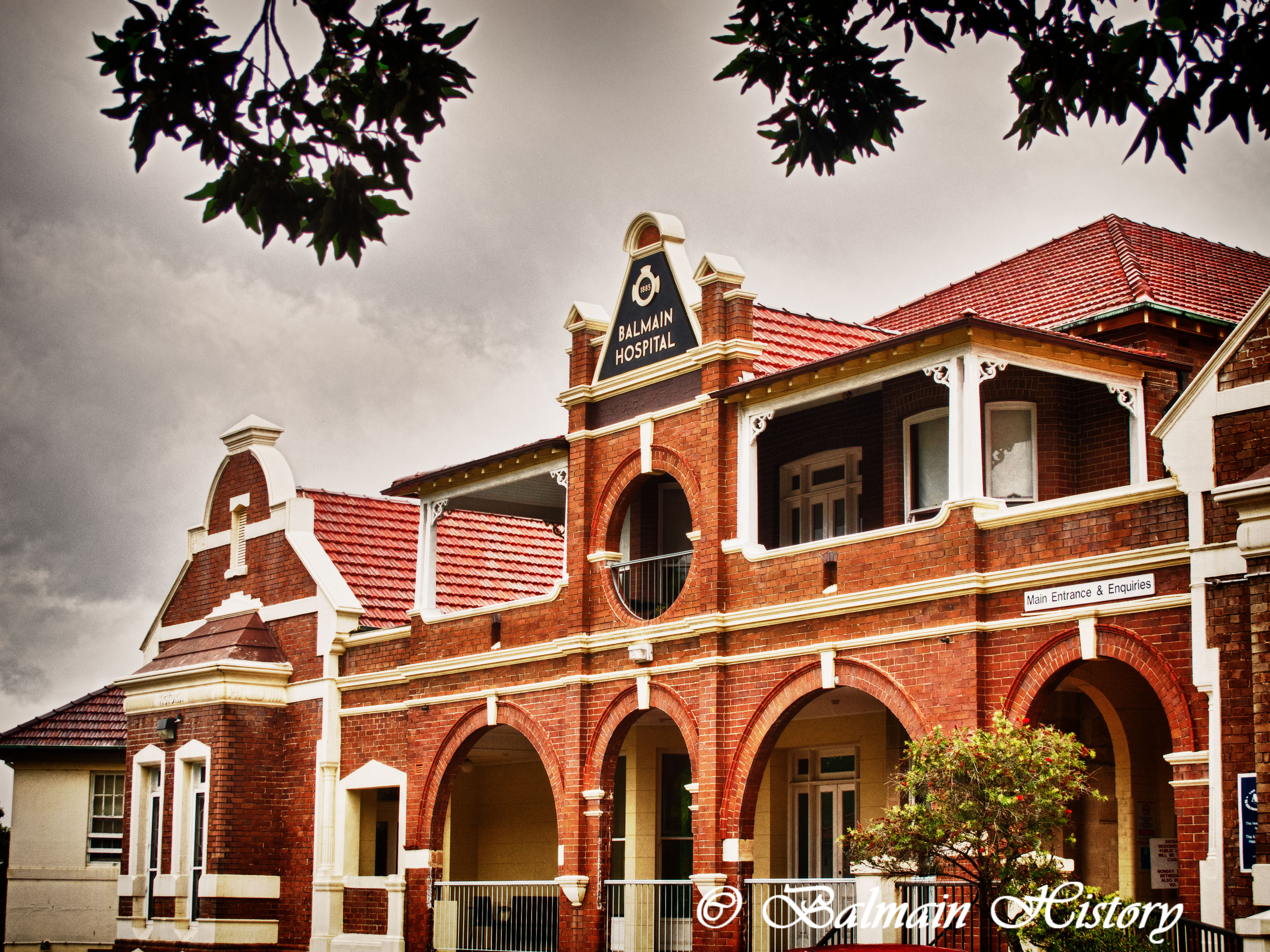
Balmain Hospital

The Sydney Local Health District of NSW Health serves the Inner West, covering Burwood, Canada Bay, Inner West and Strathfield councils, the western part of the City of Sydney, as well as the former City of Canterbury part of Canterbury-Bankstown. The public hospitals within the Sydney Local Health District are:

- Balmain Hospital
- Canterbury Hospital
- Concord Repatriation General Hospital
- Royal Prince Alfred Hospital
- Sydney Dental Hospital

The Sydney Local Health District also administers the Yaralla Estate and Rivendell (former Thomas Walker Hospital).

== Sport ==
The Inner West is represented in the National Rugby League by the Wests Tigers, a merger of the Balmain and Western Suburbs clubs. Some residents in the region also subscribe their loyalty to the Canterbury-Bankstown Bulldogs. In the tier below known as the New South Wales Cup, the area is represented by the Newtown Jets and Wests Magpies.

In rugby union, the area is represented by Sydney Uni (the University of Sydney) and West Harbour in the Sydney grade competition.

In football, Leichhardt Oval is the home of the A-league team Sydney FC. The Inner West also has many semi-professional soccer teams playing in the various divisions of the NSW State Leagues. The most high-profile club is NSW Premier League side APIA Leichhardt Tigers.

== Religion ==
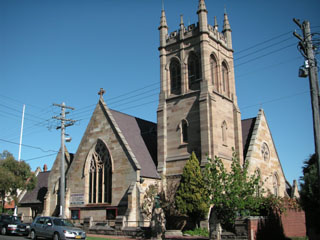
St Paul's Anglican Church, Burwood

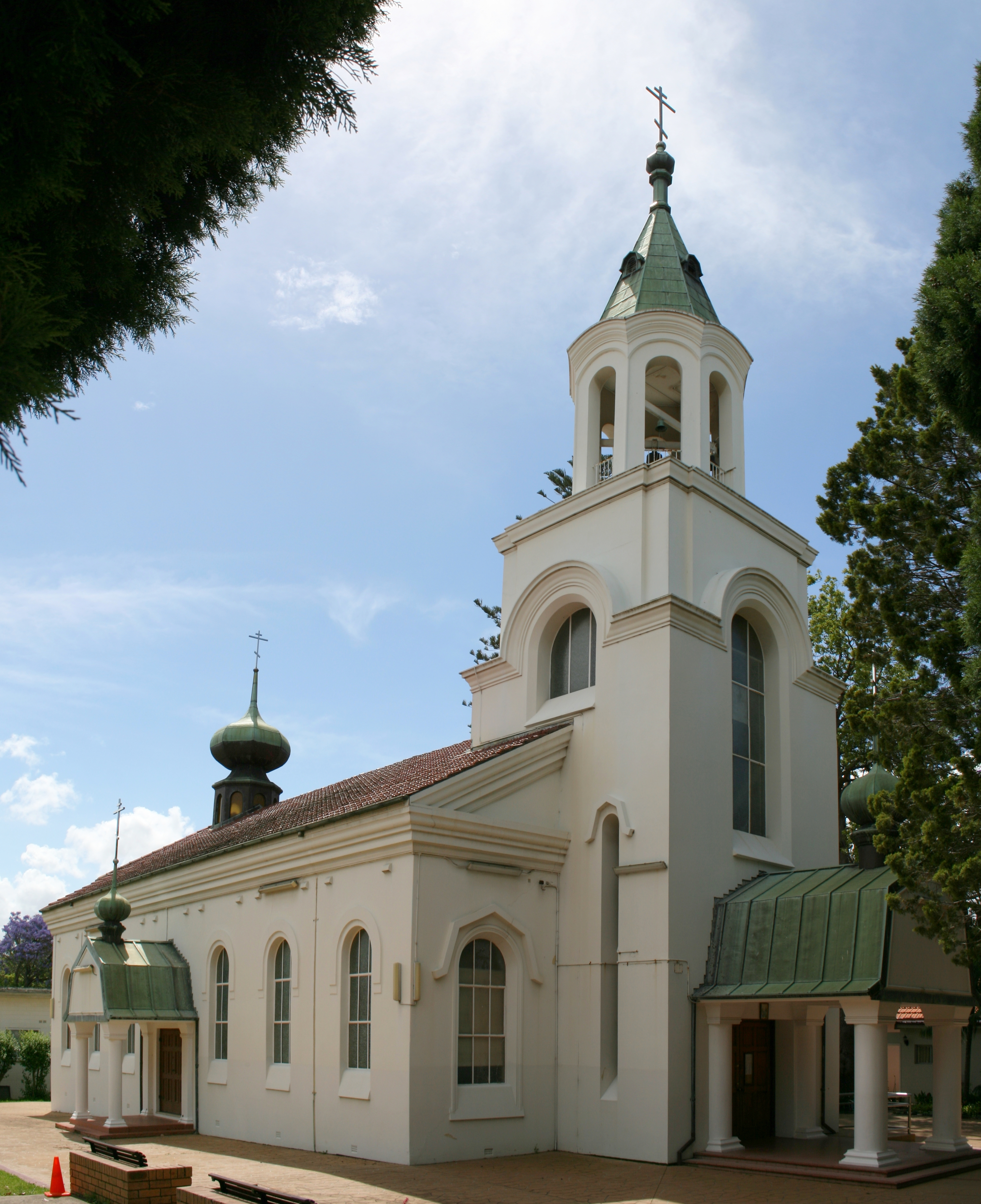
Russian Orthodox Cathedral of Saints Peter and Paul, Strathfield

In the 2021 Census, the most common responses for religion in the Sydney - Inner West statistical area (which, as noted above, covers most but not all of the Inner West by most customary definitions) were No Religion, 37.2%, Catholic 25.8%, Hinduism 6.5%, Anglican 5.7% and Not stated 5.6%.

The Inner West contains a large number of religions buildings and institutions. For example, concentrated in the Strathfield-Homebush area are the Catholic institutions the Australian Catholic University, the Catholic Institute of Sydney and the Seminary of the Good Shepherd. Strathfield is also home to the Cathedral of Saints Peter and Paul of the Russian Orthodox Church as well as the Church of the Intercession of the Holy Virgin of the Ukrainian Orthodox Church.

The heritage-listed Chinese temples Sze Yup Temple is located in Glebe. Beit Maroun, the residence of the archbishop of the Maronite Church in Australia, is located in Strathfield, while St Maroun's College is located in Dulwich Hill.
