= List of government schools in New South Wales (G–P) =

Prior to 1848, most schools in New South Wales were operated by churches or private organisations, with some financial support from the government under the Denominational School Board, which was established in 1836. In January 1848, the Board of National Education began establishing government schools to develop a public education system, with the enactment and royal assent (16 August 1848) of the National Education Board Act 1848 (NSW). The first public school, Kempsey National School, opened that year, and by 1851, more than 37 public schools were in operation in New South Wales. As of 2025, the New South Wales Department of Education, a department of the Government of New South Wales, administers more than 2,200 public schools, both primary and secondary schools, across that state, that are in these lists:

== G ==
Name	Suburb/Town	Region	Opened	Coordinates	Ref
G S Kidd Memorial School	Gunnedah	North West Slopes	1964	30°59′46.89″S 150°14′20″E	
Galston High School	Galston	Hills District	1972	33°39′38.59″S 151°2′27.44″E	
Galston Public School	Galston	Hills District	1886	33°38′51.17″S 151°2′42.73″E	
Ganmain Public School	Ganmain	Riverina	1892	34°47′47.7″S 147°2′20.96″E	
Garah Public School	Garah	New England	1896	29°4′35.41″S 149°38′1.55″E	
Garden Suburb Public School	Garden Suburb	Hunter	1958	32°56′50.38″S 151°40′58.97″E	
Gardeners Road Public School	Rosebery	Inner South	1883	33°55′14.14″S 151°11′51.05″E	
George Bass School	Bass Hill	South West	2014	33°53′52.68″S 150°59′16.77″E	
Georges Hall Public School	Georges Hall	South West	1942	33°54′42.41″S 150°59′32.55″E	
Georges River College - Hurstville Boys Campus	Hurstville	Southern Sydney	1929	33°57′44.57″S 151°6′35.17″E	
Georges River College - Oatley Senior Campus	Oatley	Southern Sydney	2001	33°58′38.05″S 151°4′51.47″E	
Georges River College – Peakhurst Campus	Peakhurst	Southern Sydney	1964	33°58′1″S 151°3′24″E	
Georges River College - Penshurst Girls Campus	Penshurst	Southern Sydney	1955	33°57′51.86″S 151°5′12.08″E	
Georges River Environmental Education Centre	Chipping Norton	Southern Sydney	2000	33°54′30.98″S 150°57′39.68″E	
Gerogery Public School	Gerogery	Riverina	2018	35°49′58.19″S 146°59′50.92″E	
Gerringong Public School	Gerringong	Illawarra	1876	34°44′58.33″S 150°49′19.39″E	
Geurie Public School	Geurie	Orana	1886	32°23′46.36″S 148°49′45.69″E	
Gibberagong Environmental Education Centre	North Turramurra	Northern Sydney	1986	33°39′37.89″S 151°9′30.52″E	
Gilgai Public School	Gilgai	Northern Tablelands	1878	29°51′8.29″S 151°6′55.79″E	
Gilgandra High School	Gilgandra	Orana	1965	31°42′18.8″S 148°39′58.12″E	
Gilgandra Public School	Gilgandra	Orana	1877	31°42′27.17″S 148°39′52.13″E	
Gillieston Public School	Gillieston Heights	Hunter	1858	32°45′11.04″S 151°31′48.14″E	
Gillwinga Public School	South Grafton	Northern Rivers	1971	29°43′28.27″S 152°55′55.6″E	
Girilambone Public School	Girilambone	Orana	1882	31°14′56.24″S 146°54′28.63″E	
Girrakool School (also Girrakool Education and Training Unit)	Kariong	Central Coast	1913	33°25′54″S 151°16′35″E	
Girraween High School	Girraween	Greater Western Sydney	1976	33°48′0.01″S 150°56′40.22″E	
Girraween Public School	Girraween	Greater West	1919	33°47′55.16″S 150°57′1.08″E	
Gladesville Public School	Gladesville	Lower North Shore	1879	33°49′56″S 151°7′34″E	
Gladstone Public School	Gladstone	Mid North Coast	1877	31°1′34.84″S 152°56′46.54″E	
Glebe Public School	Glebe	Inner West	1858	33°53′1.6″S 151°11′27.24″E	
Glen Alice Public School	Glen Alice	Central West	1884	33°2′26.3″S 150°12′54.61″E	
Glen Innes High School	Glen Innes	New England	1927	29°44′38.88″S 151°44′32.35″E	
Glen Innes Public School	Glen Innes	Northern Tablelands	1875	29°44′6.86″S 151°44′19.76″E	
Glen Innes West Infants School	Glen Innes	Northern Tablelands	1926	29°44′18.44″S 151°43′26.12″E	
Glen William Public School	Glen William	Hunter	1849	32°31′33.01″S 151°47′53.72″E	
Glenbrook Public School	Glenbrook	Lower Blue Mountains	1892	33°45′56.69″S 150°37′1.55″E	
Glendale East Public School	Glendale	Hunter	1959	32°55′37.01″S 151°39′13.8″E	
Glendale Technology High School	Glendale	Hunter	1970	32°55′34.52″S 151°38′31.77″E	
Glendenning Public School	Glendenning	Greater West	1995	33°44′32.53″S 150°51′9.41″E	
Glendon School	Hillsborough	Hunter		32°57′35″S 151°40′52″E	
Glendore Public School	Maryland	Hunter	1997	32°52′25.75″S 151°38′58.94″E	
Glenfield Park School	Glenfield	Macarthur	1927	33°58′4.15″S 150°52′46.06″E	
Glenfield Public School	Glenfield	Macarthur	1882	33°58′4.18″S 150°52′46.06″E	
Glenhaven Public School	Glenhaven	Hills District	1889	33°41′59.22″S 151°0′7.07″E	
Glenmore Park High School	Glenmore Park	Greater Western Sydney	1998	33°47′26.89″S 150°40′17.77″E	
Glenmore Park Public School	Glenmore Park	Greater West	1998	33°47′5.81″S 150°40′50.89″E	
Glenmore Road Public School	Paddington	Sydney City Central	1883	33°52′54.53″S 151°13′50.92″E	
Glenorie Public School	Glenorie	Hills District	1889	33°35′58.91″S 151°0′27.15″E	
Glenquarry Public School	Glenquarry	Southern Highlands	1869	34°31′21.11″S 150°29′0.95″E	
Glenreagh Public School	Glenreagh	Northern Rivers	1887	30°3′12.98″S 152°58′34.73″E	
Glenroi Heights Public School	Orange	Central West	1952	33°17′51.89″S 149°6′41.96″E	
Glenroy Public School	North Albury	Riverina	1975	36°3′20.14″S 146°55′1.52″E	
Glenvale School	Narara	Central Coast	1966	33°24′24.64″S 151°20′8.84″E	
Glenwood High School	Glenwood	Greater West	2005	33°43′58.47″S 150°56′15.53″E	
Glenwood Public School	Glenfield	Macarthur	1981	33°58′30.66″S 150°54′8.6″E	
Glossodia Public School	Glossodia	Hawkesbury	1898	33°31′50.27″S 150°45′57.9″E	
Gloucester High School	Gloucester	Mid North Coast	1961	32°1′0.83″S 151°57′38.06″E	
Gloucester Public School	Gloucester	Mid North Coast	1888	32°0′34.19″S 151°57′35.2″E	
Gol Gol Public School	Gol Gol	Far West	1882	34°10′45.54″S 142°13′22.01″E	
Goodooga Central School	Goodooga	Far West	1882	29°6′55.12″S 147°27′15.77″E	
Goolgowi Public School	Goolgowi	Riverina	1927	33°58′35.09″S 145°42′32.15″E	
Goolma Public School	Goolma	Central West	1875	32°22′6.31″S 149°16′5.29″E	
Goolmangar Public School	Goolmangar	Northern Rivers	1882	28°42′35.21″S 153°13′54.64″E	
Gooloogong Public School	Gooloogong	Central West	1882	33°36′59″S 148°26′7″E	
Goonellabah Public School	Goonellabah	Northern Rivers	1879	28°49′5.74″S 153°19′20.05″E	
Goonengerry Public School	Goonengerry	Northern Rivers	1899	28°36′33.77″S 153°26′21.38″E	
Gordon East Public School	Gordon	Northern Suburbs	1953	33°44′45.38″S 151°9′26.42″E	
Gordon West Public School	Pymble	Upper North Shore	1951	33°45′37.37″S 151°8′20.02″E	
Gorokan High School	Lake Haven	Central Coast	1976	33°14′36.95″S 151°30′28.76″E	
Gorokan Public School	Gorokan	Central Coast	1980	33°15′8.64″S 151°30′36.55″E	
Gosford East Public School	East Gosford	Central Coast	1960	33°26′14.02″S 151°20′58.84″E	
Gosford High School	Gosford	Central Coast	1927	33°25′6.59″S 151°20′30.1″E	
Gosford Public School	West Gosford	Central Coast	1865	33°25′17.39″S 151°19′59.84″E	
Goulburn East Public School	Goulburn	Southern Tablelands	1887	34°45′44.04″S 149°43′47.83″E	
Goulburn High School	Goulburn	Southern Tablelands	1913	34°44′47.49″S 149°42′42.34″E	
Goulburn North Public School	Goulburn North	Southern Tablelands	1877	34°44′40.58″S 149°44′2.14″E	
Goulburn Public School	Goulburn	Southern Tablelands	1868	34°45′3.25″S 149°43′5.32″E	
Goulburn South Public School	Goulburn	Southern Tablelands	1881	34°45′35.71″S 149°42′45.86″E	
Goulburn West Public School	Goulburn	Southern Tablelands	1962	34°45′33.1″S 149°42′2.04″E	
Governor Philip King Public School	Edensor Park	South West	1986	33°52′24.45″S 150°52′43.19″E	
Grafton High School	Grafton	Northern Rivers	1912	29°40′56.33″S 152°55′57.52″E	
Grafton Public School	Grafton	Northern Rivers	1852	29°41′8.9″S 152°56′2.23″E	
Grahamstown Public School	Raymond Terrace	Hunter	1994	32°45′32.39″S 151°46′28.08″E	
Gralee School	Gralee	Riverina	1988	34°33′48.62″S 146°24′44.69″E	
Granville Boys High School	Granville	Greater West	1926	33°50′2.68″S 151°0′33.55″E	
Granville East Public School	Granville	Greater West	1954	33°50′53.4″S 151°0′38.35″E	
Granville Public School	Granville	Greater West	1881	33°50′5.79″S 151°0′17.93″E	
Granville South High School	Guildford	Greater West	1966	33°51′38.03″S 150°59′51.3″E	
Granville South Public School	Guildford	Greater West	1889	33°50′54.43″S 150°59′45.19″E	
Gravesend Public School	Gravesend	North West Slopes	1901	29°35′6.88″S 150°19′59.55″E	
Grays Point Public School	Grays Point	Southern Sydney	1952	34°3′31.24″S 151°4′20.2″E	
Great Lakes College – Forster Campus	Forster	Mid North Coast	2003	32°12′55.15″S 152°31′38.71″E	
Great Lakes College - Tuncurry Junior Campus	Tuncurry	Mid North Coast	2003	32°9′41.05″S 152°29′44.45″E	
Great Lakes College – Tuncurry Senior Campus	Tuncurry	Mid North Coast	2003	32°9′41.81″S 152°29′42.06″E	
Green Hill Public School	West Kempsey	Mid North Coast	1890	31°3′33.88″S 152°48′8.31″E	
Green Square Public School	Green Square	Southern Sydney	2025	33°54′34.79″S 151°12′21.43″E	
Green Valley Public School	Green Valley	Greater West	1882	33°54′7.76″S 150°52′7.47″E	
Greenacre Public School	Greenacre	Greater West	1921	33°54′40.19″S 151°3′26.05″E	
Greenethorpe Public School	Greenethorpe	Central West	1903	33°59′53.11″S 148°24′0.2″E	
Greenway Park Public School	Carnes Hill	Greater West	2000	33°56′17.72″S 150°50′15.25″E	
Greenwell Point Public School	Greenwell Point	South Coast	1870	34°54′27.31″S 150°43′49.47″E	
Greenwich Public School	Greenwich	North Shore	1876	P:33°49′33.47″S 151°10′58.55″E; K2:33°49′54.41″S 151°11′12.23″E	
Grenfell Public School	Grenfell	Central West	1867	33°53′34.4″S 148°9′57.35″E	
Gresford Public School	Gresford	Hunter	1868	32°25′38.1″S 151°32′18.37″E	
Greta Public School	Greta	Hunter	1875	32°40′48.66″S 151°23′16.14″E	
Greystanes High School	Greystanes	Greater West	1963	33°48′45.76″S 150°56′28.53″E	
Greystanes Public School	Greystanes	Greater West	1902	33°49′41.67″S 150°56′28.48″E	
Griffith East Public School	Griffith	Riverina	1960	34°17′12.56″S 146°3′41.01″E	
Griffith High School	Griffith	Riverina	1933	34°17′30.51″S 146°2′20.03″E	
Griffith North Public School	Griffith	Riverina	1953	34°16′47.16″S 146°2′55.18″E	
Griffith Public School	Griffith	Riverina	1920	34°17′28.84″S 146°2′13.85″E	
Grose View Public School	Grose Vale	Greater West	1976	33°35′40.51″S 150°39′56.6″E	
Guildford Public School	Guildford	Greater West	1915	33°51′20.1″S 150°58′53.12″E	
Guildford West Public School	Guildford West	Greater West	1956	33°50′54.01″S 150°58′1.37″E	
Guise Public School	Macquarie Fields	South West	1973	33°59′13.67″S 150°53′46.04″E	
Gulargambone Central School	Gulargambone	Central West	1881	31°19′57.67″S 148°28′29.67″E	
Gulgong High School	Gulgong	Central West	1981	32°21′36.1″S 149°32′19.45″E	
Gulgong Public School	Gulgong	Central West	1868	32°21′35.97″S 149°32′16.21″E	
Gulmarrad Public School	Gulmarrad	Northern Rivers	1891	29°29′19.66″S 153°14′2.27″E	
Gulyangarri Public School	Liverpool	South West	2024	33°55′0.96″S 150°55′59.98″E	
Gum Flat Public School	Gum Flat	Northern Tablelands	1883	29°46′46.85″S 150°58′45.1″E	
Gundagai High School	Gundagai	Riverina	1967	35°3′25.73″S 148°6′0.07″E	
Gundagai Public School	Gundagai	Riverina	1851	35°3′5.46″S 148°6′30.07″E	
Gundagai South Public School	South Gundagai	Riverina	1881	35°4′48.02″S 148°6′12.76″E	
Gundaroo Public School	Gundaroo	Southern Tablelands	1865	35°1′47.85″S 149°15′59.75″E	
Gunnedah High School	Gunnedah	North West Slopes	1955	30°58′57.73″S 150°14′56.26″E	
Gunnedah Public School	Gunnedah	North West Slopes	1862	30°58′37.45″S 150°15′24.05″E	
Gunnedah South Public School	Gunnedah	North West Slopes	1955	30°59′28.01″S 150°15′3.43″E	
Gunning Public School	Gunning	Southern Tablelands	1858	34°46′59.78″S 149°15′56.51″E	
Guyra Central School	Guyra	New England	1883	30°13′21.26″S 151°40′35.54″E	
Gwabegar Public School	Gwabegar	North West Slopes	1924	30°36′39.88″S 148°58′27.1″E	
Gwandalan Public School	Gwandalan	Central Coast	1961	33°8′7.63″S 151°34′53.12″E	
Gwynneville Public School	Gwynneville	Illawarra	1951	34°25′4.7″S 150°52′46.21″E	
Gymea Bay Public School	Gymea Bay	Southern Sydney	1935	34°2′48.97″S 151°4′59.01″E	
Gymea Technology High School	Gymea	Southern Sydney	1963	34°1′43.7″S 151°4′57.83″E	
Gymea North Public School	Gymea	Southern Sydney	1967	34°1′33.04″S 151°5′20.5″E	

== H ==
Name	Suburb/Town	Region	Opened	Coordinates	Ref
Haberfield Public School	Haberfield	Inner West	1910	33°52′44.12″S 151°8′0.36″E	
Halinda School	Whalan	Greater West	1974	33°45′38.11″S 150°48′23.26″E	
Hallidays Point Public School	Diamond Beach	Mid North Coast	1994	32°2′29.03″S 152°32′8.92″E	
Hambledon Public School	Quakers Hill	Greater West	1994	33°42′59.52″S 150°53′13.9″E	
Hamilton North Public School	Hamilton North	Hunter	1943	32°55′3.46″S 151°44′3.24″E	
Hamilton Public School	Hamilton	Hunter	1858	32°55′27.02″S 151°44′36.7″E	
Hamilton South Public School	Hamilton South	Hunter	1933	32°56′1.53″S 151°45′13.28″E	
Hammondville Public School	Hammondville	South West	1933	33°56′49.64″S 150°57′16.61″E	
Hampden Park Public School	Lakemba	Southern Sydney	1979	33°54′54.87″S 151°4′25.78″E	
Hampton Public School	Hampton	Central West	1873	33°38′55.82″S 150°2′56.54″E	
Hannam Vale Public School	Hannam Vale	Mid North Coast	1892	31°42′45.2″S 152°35′39.1″E	
Hannans Road Public School	Riverwood	Southern Sydney	1957	33°56′45.86″S 151°3′30.26″E	
Hanwood Public School	Hanwood	Riverina	1913	34°19′47.28″S 146°2′34.36″E	
Harbord Public School	Freshwater	Northern Beaches	1912	33°46′20.97″S 151°17′9.26″E	
Harcourt Public School	Campsie	South West	1926	33°54′32.96″S 151°5′42.79″E	
Hargraves Public School	Hargraves	Central West	1856	32°47′1.67″S 149°27′44.74″E	
Harrington Park Public School	Harrington Park	Greater West	2002	34°1′36.73″S 150°44′18.48″E	
Harrington Public School	Harrington	Mid North Coast	1872	31°52′14.17″S 152°41′18.22″E	
Harrington Street Public School	Cabramatta West	South West	1962	33°53′18.81″S 150°54′35.04″E	
Harwood Island Public School	Harwood	Northern Rivers	1871	29°25′32.51″S 153°14′22.91″E	
Hassall Grove Public School	Hassall Grove	Greater West	1993	33°44′5.07″S 150°50′17.89″E	
Hastings Public School	Port Macquarie	Mid North Coast	1981	31°27′12.08″S 152°55′5.75″E	
Hastings Secondary College – Port Macquarie Campus	Port Macquarie	Mid North Coast	1962	31°26′0.04″S 152°55′14.44″E	
Havenlee School	North Nowra	South Coast	1981	34°51′18.75″S 150°34′37.31″E	
Hawkesbury High School	Freemans Reach	Greater West	1983	33°33′32.41″S 150°47′52.69″E	
Hay Public School	Hay	Riverina	1869	34°30′21.62″S 144°50′40.3″E	
Hay War Memorial High School	Hay	Riverina	1923	34°30′18.4″S 144°50′26.33″E	
Hayes Park Public School	Kanahooka	Illawarra	1969	34°29′30.6″S 150°48′57.98″E	
Hazelbrook Public School	Hazelbrook	Blue Mountains	1945	33°43′33.7″S 150°27′32.34″E	
Heathcote East Public School	Heathcote	Southern Sydney	1961	34°4′59.33″S 151°1′11.88″E	
Heathcote High School	Heathcote	Southern Sydney	1960	34°4′56.6″S 151°0′52.24″E	
Heathcote Public School	Heathcote	Southern Sydney	1886	34°5′11.01″S 151°0′27.04″E	
Heaton Public School	Jesmond	Hunter	1958	32°53′58.61″S 151°41′42.62″E	
Hebersham Public School	Hebersham	Greater West	1972	33°44′51.64″S 150°49′29.51″E	
Heckenberg Public School	Heckenberg	Greater West	1965	33°54′31.54″S 150°53′26.02″E	
Helensburgh Public School	Helensburgh	Illawarra	1887	34°11′2.77″S 150°59′19.06″E	
Henry Fulton Public School	Cranebrook	Greater West	1997	33°42′15.04″S 150°42′34.18″E	
Henry Kendall High School	Gosford	Central Coast	1970	33°25′16.01″S 151°20′7.25″E	
Henty Public School	Henty	Riverina	1892	35°31′1.12″S 147°1′52.16″E	
Hermidale Public School	Hermidale	Orana	1901	31°33′3.67″S 146°43′29.42″E	
Hernani Public School	Hernani	Northern Rivers	1897	30°17′40.1″S 152°25′21.61″E	
Herons Creek Public School	Herons Creek	Northern Rivers	1893	31°34′49.88″S 152°43′49.59″E	
Highlands School	Renwick	Southern Highlands	2001	34°27′14.07″S 150°28′36.55″E	
Hill End Public School	Hill End	Central Tablelands	1870	33°2′4.34″S 149°24′57.17″E	<
Hill Top Public School	Hill Top	Southern Highlands	1984	34°21′14″S 150°29′28″E	
Hillsborough Public School	Charlestown	Hunter	1963	32°57′35.69″S 151°40′52.21″E	
Hillside Public School	Glenorie	Greater West	1926	33°36′3.76″S 150°58′33.78″E	
Hillston Central School	Hillston	Riverina	1926	33°28′53.84″S 145°32′22.09″E	
Hilltop Road Public School	Merrylands	Greater West	1952	33°49′34.62″S 150°58′23.13″E	
Hillvue Public School	Tamworth	North West Slopes	1970	31°6′48.23″S 150°54′1.96″E	
Hinchinbrook Public School	Hinchinbrook	South West	1955	33°54′46.93″S 150°51′31.9″E	
Hinton Public School	Hinton	Hunter	1848	32°43′0.13″S 151°39′2.91″E	
Hobartville Public School	Hobartville	Greater West	1971	33°36′10.46″S 150°44′32.56″E	
Holbrook Public School	Holbrook	Riverina	1875	35°43′0.71″S 147°19′10.75″E	
Holgate Public School	Holgate	Central Coast	1928	33°24′19.09″S 151°24′29.44″E	
Holman Place School	Cowra	Central West	1970	33°49′26.88″S 148°41′38.99″E	
Holmwood Public School	Holmwood	Central West	1880	33°48′34.28″S 148°45′21.29″E	
Holroyd High School	Greystanes	Greater West	1968	33°50′1.03″S 150°57′3.01″E	
Holroyd School	Merrylands	Greater West	1961	33°49′43.69″S 150°58′54.92″E	
Holsworthy High School	Holsworthy	South West	1983	33°57′19.75″S 150°57′6.73″E	
Holsworthy Public School	Holsworthy	South West	1961	33°57′21.64″S 150°57′17.04″E	
Homebush Boys High School	Homebush	Inner West	1936	33°51′58.15″S 151°4′37.96″E	
Homebush Public School	Homebush	Inner West	1885	33°52′2.26″S 151°5′5.83″E	
Homebush West Public School	Homebush West	Inner West	1912	33°51′58.96″S 151°4′0.02″E	
HopeTown School	Wyong	Central Coast	1999	33°16′44.66″S 151°26′49.25″E	
Hornsby Girls' High School	Hornsby	Upper North Shore	1930	33°42′21.68″S 151°6′4.84″E	
Hornsby Heights Public School	Hornsby Heights	Upper North Shore	1961	33°40′11.99″S 151°5′48.28″E	
Hornsby North Public School	Hornsby	Upper North Shore	1966	33°40′59.9″S 151°5′53.87″E	
Hornsby South Public School	Hornsby	Upper North Shore	1952	33°42′47.48″S 151°5′42.7″E	
Horsley Park Public School	Horsley Park	Greater West	1931	33°50′27.77″S 150°51′9.06″E	
Howlong Public School	Howlong	Riverina	1861	35°58′50.77″S 146°38′10.75″E	
Hoxton Park High School	Hinchinbrook	South West	1974	33°55′9.66″S 150°51′45.95″E	
Hoxton Park Public School	Hoxton Park	Greater Western Sydney	1889	33°55′54.71″S 150°50′58.42″E	
Hume Public School	Lavington	Riverina	1969	36°3′0.62″S 146°56′52.88″E	
Humula Public School	Humula	Riverina	1879	35°29′0.38″S 147°45′42.58″E	
Hunter River Community School	Metford	Hunter	1977	32°45′51.79″S 151°36′44.84″E	
Hunter River High School	Heatherbrae	Hunter	1956	32°46′54.46″S 151°43′57.5″E	
Hunter School of the Performing Arts	Broadmeadow	Hunter	1923	32°55′26.7″S 151°43′39.79″E	
Hunter Sports High School	Gateshead	Hunter	1959	32°59′10″S 151°41′28.9″E	
Hunters Hill High School	Hunters Hill	Lower North Shore	1958	33°49′59.46″S 151°8′53.7″E	
Hunters Hill Public School	Hunters Hill	Lower North Shore	1870	33°50′6.79″S 151°9′4.76″E	
Huntingdon Public School	Huntingdon	Mid North Coast	1868	31°28′42.13″S 152°39′37.87″E	
Hurlstone Agricultural High School	Glenfield	South West	1907	33°58′10.72″S 150°53′29.47″E	
Hurstville Grove Infants School	Penshurst	St George	1951	33°58′41.57″S 151°5′42.07″E	
Hurstville Public School	Hurstville	St George	1876	33°57′53.27″S 151°6′39.99″E	
Hurstville South Public School	Hurstville	St George	1915	33°58′19.98″S 151°5′58.23″E	
Huskisson Public School	Huskisson	South Coast	1871	35°2′14.2″S 150°40′4.72″E	

== I ==
Name	Suburb/Town	Region	Opened	Coordinates	Ref
Ilford Public School	Ilford	Central Tablelands	1859	32°58′0.56″S 149°51′19.34″E	
Illabo Public School	Illabo	Riverina	1884	34°48′50.42″S 147°44′26.68″E	
Illaroo Road Public School	North Nowra	South Coast	1969	34°51′34.84″S 150°35′24.2″E	
Illawarra Environmental Education Centre	Dunmore	Illawarra	1991	34°36′8.29″S 150°51′39.14″E	
Illawarra Hospital School	Wollongong	Illawarra	1965	34°25′28.82″S 150°52′58.14″E	
Illawarra Sports High School	Berkeley	Illawarra	1957	34°28′47.47″S 150°51′11.24″E	
Illawong Public School	Illawong	Southern Sydney	1960	33°59′54.34″S 151°2′32.56″E	
Iluka Public School	Iluka	Northern Rivers	1879	29°24′19.82″S 153°20′56.11″E	
Induna School	South Grafton	Northern Rivers	1999	29°43′48.37″S 152°56′50.09″E	
Ingleburn High School	Ingleburn	Macarthur	1960	34°0′19.01″S 150°52′17.01″E	
Ingleburn Public School	Ingleburn	Macarthur	1887	34°0′2.78″S 150°51′59.33″E	
Inner Sydney High School	Surry Hills	Sydney City Central	2020	33°53′20.86″S 151°12′21.67″E	
Inverell High School	Inverell	North West Slopes	1939	29°45′58.33″S 151°6′38″E	
Inverell Public School	Inverell	North West Slopes	1862	29°46′25.3″S 151°7′20.65″E	
Ironbark Ridge Public School	Rouse Hill	Hills District	2005	33°41′17.61″S 150°55′57.65″E	
Iona Public School	Iona	Hunter	1853	32°39′52.97″S 151°36′13.88″E	
Irrawang High School	Raymond Terrace	Hunter	1983	32°45′43.79″S 151°46′0.64″E	
Irrawang Public School	Raymond Terrace	Hunter	1968	32°45′28.78″S 151°45′20.75″E	
Islington Public School	Islington	Newcastle	1877	32°54′41.99″S 151°44′39.45″E	
Ivanhoe Central School	Ivanhoe	Far West	1889	32°53′56.2″S 144°17′59.98″E	

== J ==
Name	Suburb/Town	Region	Opened	Coordinates	Ref
J J Cahill Memorial High School	Mascot	Southern Sydney	1961	33°55′40.23″S 151°12′4.9″E	
Jamberoo Public School	Jamberoo	Illawarra	1878	34°38′38.73″S 150°46′25.83″E	
James Busby High School	Green Valley, New South Wales	South West	1970	33°54′35.29″S 150°52′25.47″E	
James Erskine Public School	Erskine Park	Greater West	1988	33°48′18.73″S 150°48′13.41″E	
James Fallon High School	North Albury	Riverina	1961	36°3′38.86″S 146°55′45.28″E	
James Meehan High School	Macquarie Fields	Macarthur	1975	33°59′17.68″S 150°53′32.08″E	
James Ruse Agricultural High School	Carlingford	North West	1959	33°46′54.84″S 151°2′32.36″E	
Jamison High School	South Penrith	South West	1982	33°46′29.52″S 150°41′55″E	
Jamisontown Public School	Jamisontown	Greater West	1982	33°46′20.45″S 150°40′58.31″E	
Jannali East Public School	Jannali East	Southern Sydney	1956	34°1′2.95″S 151°4′19.93″E	
Jannali Public School	Jannali	Southern Sydney	1944	34°1′5.14″S 151°3′41.34″E	
Jasper Road Public School	Baulkham Hills	Hills District	1967	33°45′41.41″S 150°58′56.22″E	
Jennings Public School	Jennings	Northern Tablelands	1889	28°55′39.05″S 151°56′4.22″E	
Jerangle Public School	Jerangle	Snowy Monaro	1884	35°52′11.95″S 149°21′51.58″E	
Jerilderie Public School	Jerilderie	Riverina	1869	35°21′17.4″S 145°43′46.25″E	
Jerrabomberra Public School	Jerrabomberra	Capital Country	2001	35°23′11.06″S 149°11′56.61″E	
Jerrys Plains Public School	Jerrys Plains	Hunter	1881	32°29′46.73″S 150°54′22.01″E	
Jesmond Public School	Jesmond	Hunter	1887	32°54′13.49″S 151°41′42.44″E	
Jewells Primary School	Jewells	Hunter	1977	33°0′53.93″S 151°41′14.97″E	
Jiggi Public School	Jiggi	Northern Rivers	1885	28°40′41.01″S 153°10′54.68″E	
Jilliby Public School	Jilliby	Central Coast	1889	33°14′24.03″S 151°22′47.62″E	
Jindabyne Central School	Jindabyne	Snowy Monaro	1884	36°24′59.8″S 148°37′7.96″E	
Jindera Public School	Jindera	Riverina	1876	35°57′32.32″S 146°53′10.81″E	
John Brotchie Nursery School	Botany	Southern Sydney	1949	33°56′33.58″S 151°11′45.91″E	
John Edmondson High School	Horningsea Park	South West	2005	33°56′42.53″S 150°50′33.76″E	
John Hunter Hospital School	New Lambton Heights	Hunter	2005	32°55′21.42″S 151°41′32.98″E	
John Purchase Public School	Cherrybrook	North West	1986	33°43′7.33″S 151°2′22.93″E	
John Warby Public School	Airds	Macarthur	1976	34°4′53.86″S 150°50′1.37″E	
Johns River Public School	Johns River	Mid North Coast	1870	31°43′56.67″S 152°41′46.78″E	
Jugiong Public School	Jugiong	South West Slopes	1883	34°49′12.75″S 148°20′5.18″E	
Junee High School	Junee	Riverina	1961	34°52′9.34″S 147°35′26.44″E	
Junee North Public School	Junee	Riverina	1923	34°51′18.94″S 147°35′5.89″E	
Junee Public School	Junee	Riverina	1880	34°52′23.8″S 147°35′4.36″E	

== K ==
Name	Suburb/Town	Region	Opened	Coordinates	Ref
Kahibah Public School	Kahibah	Hunter	1938	32°57′53.81″S 151°42′49.94″E	
Kalinda School	Griffith	Riverina	1981	34°17′35.69″S 146°2′7.83″E	
Kambora Public School	Davidson	Northern Beaches	1979	33°44′24.15″S 151°11′41.34″E	
Kanahooka High School	Kanahooka	Illawarra	1974	34°29′39.72″S 150°48′16.4″E	
Kandeer School	North Albury	Riverina	1991	36°3′44.69″S 146°55′41″E	
Kandos Public School	Kandos	Central Tablelands	1874	32°51′22.87″S 149°58′26.48″E	
Kandos High School	Kandos	Central Tablelands	1929	32°51′21.84″S 149°58′29.72″E	
Kangaloon Public School	Kangaloon	Southern Highlands	1869	34°33′9.73″S 150°31′46.38″E	
Kangaroo Valley Public School	Kangaroo Valley	Illawarra	1871	34°44′8.91″S 150°31′54.86″E	
Kanwal Public School	Kanwal	Central Coast	1911	33°15′45.73″S 151°29′0.13″E	
Kapooka Public School	Kapooka	Riverina	1953	35°9′2.94″S 147°18′12.14″E	
Karabar High School	Karabar	Southern Tablelands	1977	35°21′54.98″S 149°13′31.5″E	
Karangi Public School	Karangi	Mid North Coast	1892	30°15′10.75″S 153°2′50.4″E	
Kareela Public School	Kareela	Southern Sydney	1968	34°0′48.06″S 151°4′58.79″E	
Kariong Public School	Kariong	Central Coast	1997	33°26′27.8″S 151°17′22.42″E	
Karningul School	Bateau Bay	Hunter	1979	33°53′6″S 151°1′25″E	
Karonga School	Epping	Northern Sydney	1970	33°46′15.65″S 151°3′40.6″E	
Karuah Public School	Karuah	Hunter	1970	32°39′15.37″S 151°57′57.75″E	
Katoomba High School	Katoomba	Blue Mountains	1919	33°43′40.64″S 150°18′47.68″E	
Katoomba North Public School	Katoomba	Blue Mountains	1955	33°41′56.36″S 150°18′58.09″E	
Katoomba Public School	Katoomba	Blue Mountains	1879	33°43′9.77″S 150°18′49.46″E	
Kearns Public School	Kearns	South West	1992	34°1′19.48″S 150°48′18.64″E	
Kearsley Public School	Kearsley	Hunter	1976	32°51′25.79″S 151°23′48.39″E	
Kegworth Public School	Leichhardt	Inner West	1887	33°53′11.32″S 151°8′50.52″E	
Keira High School	North Wollongong	Illawarra	1917	34°24′20.27″S 150°53′19.16″E	
Keiraville Public School	Keiraville	Illawarra	1916	34°24′51.07″S 150°52′23.17″E	
Kellys Plains Public School	Kellys Plains	New England	1863	30°34′19.49″S 151°38′16.94″E	
Kellyville High School	Kellyville	Greater West	2003	33°42′31.11″S 150°58′5.36″E	
Kellyville Public School	Kellyville	Hills District	1873	33°42′39.95″S 150°57′28.13″E	
Kellyville Ridge Public School	Kellyville Ridge	Greater West	2004	33°42′13.98″S 150°55′29.65″E	
Kelso Public School	Kelso	Central Tablelands	1856	33°25′0.95″S 149°36′14.83″E	
Kemblawarra Public School	Port Kembla	Illawarra	2011	34°29′21.49″S 150°53′36.48″E	
Kempsey East Public School	Kempsey	Mid North Coast	1953	31°5′0.61″S 152°50′47.65″E	
Kempsey High School	West Kempsey	Mid North Coast	1892	31°4′8.23″S 152°49′30.76″E	
Kempsey South Public School	West Kempsey	Mid North Coast	1957	31°5′40.24″S 152°49′44.47″E	
Kempsey West Public School	West Kempsey	Mid North Coast	1858	31°4′40.15″S 152°49′46.94″E	
Kendall Public School	Kendall	Mid North Coast	1874	31°37′37.39″S 152°42′2.17″E	
Kensington Public School	Kensington	Eastern Sydney	1881	33°54′34.63″S 151°13′29.84″E	
Kent Road Public School	North Ryde	Northern Sydney	1882	33°47′13.4″S 151°6′29.08″E	
Kenthurst Public School	Kenthurst	Hills District	1882	33°39′57.64″S 151°0′17.82″E	
Kentlyn Public School	Kentlyn	South West	1972	34°4′22.61″S 150°51′31.84″E	
Kentucky Public School	Kentucky	New England	1868	30°45′31.94″S 151°27′0.64″E	
Khancoban Public School	Khancoban	Snowy Mountains	1961	36°12′52.37″S 148°7′55.11″E	
Kiama High School	Kiama	Illawarra	1954	34°40′50.3″S 150°50′49.71″E	
Kiama Public School	Kiama	Illawarra	1871	34°40′9.81″S 150°51′1.15″E	
Killara High School	East Killara	Northern Sydney	1968	33°45′21.8″S 151°10′26.07″E	
Killara Public School	Killara	Northern Sydney	1906	33°45′57.39″S 151°8′55″E	
Killarney Heights High School	Killarney Heights	Northern Beaches	1967	33°46′17.98″S 151°12′56.87″E	
Killarney Heights Public School	Killarney Heights	Northern Beaches	1967	33°46′32.33″S 151°12′57.68″E	
Killarney Vale Public School	Killarney Vale	Central Coast	1956	33°21′56.48″S 151°27′22.94″E	
Kinchela Public School	Kinchela	Mid North Coast	1892	30°59′28″S 152°59′40″E	
Kincumber High School	Kincumber	Central Coast	1993	33°27′53.72″S 151°22′58.34″E	
Kincumber Public School	Kincumber	Central Coast	1887	33°27′53.72″S 151°22′58.31″E	
King Park Public School	Wakeley	Greater West	1962	33°52′44.92″S 150°54′40.94″E	
King Street Public School	Singleton	Hunter	1877	32°34′8.79″S 151°10′30.93″E	
Kings Langley Public School	Kings Langley	Greater West	1981	33°44′43.83″S 150°55′27.92″E	
Kingscliff High School	Kingscliff	Northern Rivers	1986	28°15′57.48″S 153°34′20.51″E	
Kingscliff Public School	Kingscliff	Northern Rivers	1908	28°15′32.73″S 153°34′47.23″E	
Kingsgrove High School	Kingsgrove	Southern Sydney	1959	33°56′57″S 151°6′8″E	
Kingsgrove North High School	Kingsgrove	Southern Sydney	1959	33°56′0.73″S 151°5′51.25″E	
Kingsgrove Public School	Kingsgrove	Southern Sydney	1876	33°56′54.99″S 151°6′17.91″E	
Kingstown Public School	Kingstown	New England	1896	30°30′25.37″S 151°6′57.13″E	
Kingswood High School	Kingswood	Greater West	1959	33°46′16.08″S 150°42′57.01″E	
Kingswood Park Public School	Kingswood	Greater West	1977	33°44′30.31″S 150°42′42.55″E	
Kingswood Public School	Kingswood	Greater West	1887	33°45′50.6″S 150°43′36.16″E	
Kingswood South Public School	Kingswood	Greater West	1976	33°46′6.62″S 150°42′42.79″E	
Kirkton Public School	Kirkton	Hunter	1867	32°36′34.16″S 151°17′24.41″E	
Kirrawee High School	Kirrawee	Southern Sydney	1966	34°2′37.04″S 151°4′26.46″E	
Kirrawee Public School	Kirrawee	Southern Sydney	1953	34°2′0.32″S 151°4′36.08″E	
Kitchener Public School	Kitchener	Hunter	1953	32°52′40.09″S 151°22′12.26″E	
Kogarah High School	Kogarah	Southern Sydney	1891	33°57′40.42″S 151°8′4.06″E	
Kogarah Public School	Kogarah	Southern Sydney	1876	33°57′43.25″S 151°8′10.42″E	
Koonawarra Public School	Koonawarra	Illawarra	1957	34°30′3.87″S 150°48′25.15″E	
Koorawatha Public School	Koorawatha	South Western Slopes	1882	34°2′7.79″S 148°33′32.09″E	
Kooringal High School	Kooringal	Riverina	1973	35°8′38.76″S 147°22′51.87″E	
Kooringal Public School	Kooringal	Riverina	1963	35°8′53.49″S 147°22′21.2″E	
Kootingal Public School	Kootingal	New England	1858	31°3′13.81″S 151°3′15.89″E	
Kororo Public School	Korora	Mid North Coast	1902	30°15′15.11″S 153°7′54.04″E	
Kotara High School	Adamstown Heights	Hunter	1968	32°56′51.48″S 151°42′27.89″E	
Kotara School	New Lambton	Hunter	1978	32°56′33.04″S 151°42′0.73″E	
Kotara South Public School	Kotara South	Hunter	1960	32°56′48.42″S 151°41′41.12″E	
Krambach Public School	Krambach	Mid North Coast	1887	32°2′46.68″S 152°16′18.97″E	
Ku-ring-gai High School	North Turramurra	Northern Sydney	1965	33°41′29.21″S 151°9′7.57″E	
Kulnura Public School	Kulnura	Central Coast	1921	33°13′55.6″S 151°12′59.26″E	
Kurmond Public School	Kurmond	Hawkesbury	1924	33°32′59.11″S 150°41′31.93″E	
Kurnell Public School	Kurnell	Southern Sydney	1889	34°0′36.62″S 151°12′13.57″E	
Kurrajong East Public School	East Kurrajong	Hawkesbury	1868	33°30′40.22″S 150°46′39.28″E	
Kurrajong North Public School	Kurrajong Hills	Hawkesbury	1920	33°32′31.95″S 150°38′21.6″E	
Kurrajong Public School	Kurrajong	Hawkesbury	1861	33°33′20.47″S 150°39′45.76″E	
Kurrambee School	Werrington	Greater West	1992	33°45′58.63″S 150°45′25.67″E	
Kurri Kurri High School	Kurri Kurri	Hunter	1956	32°48′36.8″S 151°29′9.74″E	
Kurri Kurri Public School	Kurri Kurri	Hunter	1904	32°49′14.96″S 151°28′40.18″E	
Kyeemagh Infants School	Kyeemagh	Southern Sydney	1954	33°56′55.92″S 151°9′46.36″E	
Kyogle High School	Kyogle	Northern Rivers	1955	28°37′32.11″S 153°0′8.77″E	
Kyogle Public School	Kyogle	Northern Rivers	1875	28°37′33.74″S 153°0′14″E	

== L ==
Name	Suburb/Town	Region	Opened	Coordinates	Ref
La Perouse Public School	La Perouse	Eastern Sydney	1953	33°58′46.21″S 151°14′7.3″E	
Ladysmith Public School	Ladysmith	Riverina	1883	35°12′33.11″S 147°30′37.33″E	
Laggan Public School	Laggan	Southern Tablelands	1859	34°24′21.81″S 149°31′38.59″E	
Laguna Public School	Laguna	Hunter	1868	32°59′32.51″S 151°7′50.3″E	
Laguna Street Public School	Caringbah South	Southern Sydney	1957	34°2′47″S 151°6′46″E	
Lake Albert Public School	Lake Albert	Riverina	1972	35°10′25.88″S 147°22′46.51″E	
Lake Cargelligo Central School	Lake Cargelligo	Central West	1883	33°17′42.97″S 146°22′24.88″E	
Lake Cathie Public School	Lake Cathie	Mid North Coast	1980	31°34′7.42″S 152°49′43.61″E	
Lake Heights Public School	Lake Heights	Illawarra	1954	34°29′22.3″S 150°52′5.2″E	
Lake Illawarra High School	Lake Illawarra	Illawarra	1972	34°32′30.94″S 150°51′3.61″E	
Lake Illawarra South Public School	Lake Illawarra	Illawarra	1959	34°32′21.78″S 150°51′34.03″E	
Lake Macquarie High School	Booragul	Hunter	1974	32°58′31.66″S 151°36′51.96″E	
Lake Munmorah High School	Lake Munmorah	Central Coast	2001	33°11′17.37″S 151°34′28.91″E	
Lake Munmorah Public School	Lake Munmorah	Central Coast	1987	33°11′19.25″S 151°34′33.28″E	
Lake Wyangan Public School	Lake Wyangan	Riverina	1958	34°14′52.94″S 146°2′0.17″E	
Lakelands Public School	Dapto	Illawarra	1962	34°30′18″S 150°47′41.71″E	
Lakemba Public School	Lakemba	South West	1913	33°55′24.42″S 151°4′15.06″E	
Lakeside School	Gateshead	Hunter	1991	32°58′32.1″S 151°40′57.61″E	
Lalor Park Public School	Lalor Park	Greater West	1959	33°45′37.91″S 150°55′53.33″E	
Lambton High School	Lambton	Hunter	1974	32°55′4.62″S 151°43′20.44″E	
Lambton Public School	Lambton	Hunter	1865	32°54′43.48″S 151°42′16.4″E	
Lane Cove Public School	Lane Cove	Lower North Shore	1876	33°48′59.41″S 151°10′9.58″E	
Lane Cove West Public School	Lane Cove West	Lower North Shore	1962	33°48′36.08″S 151°9′6.04″E	
Lansdowne Public School	Lansdowne	Mid North Coast	1869	31°47′1.99″S 152°31′58.13″E	
Lansvale East Public School	Cabramatta	South-western Sydney	1962	33°53′53.89″S 150°57′52.66″E	
Lansvale Public School	Lansvale	South West	1929	33°53′30.23″S 150°57′12.57″E	
Lapstone Public School	Lapstone	Lower Blue Mountains	1963	33°46′18.62″S 150°37′51.59″E	
Largs Public School	Largs	Hunter	1838	32°42′0.4″S 151°36′21.83″E	
Larnook Public School	Larnook	Northern Rivers	1934	28°38′55.78″S 153°6′51.6″E	
Laurieton Public School	Laurieton	Mid North Coast	1876	31°39′6″S 152°47′50″E	
Lavington East Public School	Lavington	Riverina	1972	36°2′23.2″S 146°56′52.24″E	
Lavington Public School	Lavington	Riverina	1942	36°2′16.11″S 146°55′42.35″E	
Lawrence Hargrave School	Warwick Farm	South West	1961	33°54′33.01″S 150°56′5.68″E	
Lawrence Public School	Lawrence	Northern Rivers	1878	29°29′28.47″S 153°5′59.12″E	
Lawson Public School	Lawson	Blue Mountains	1875	33°43′15.83″S 150°25′43.38″E	
Leeton High School	Leeton	Riverina	1926	34°32′50.08″S 146°24′18.52″E	
Leeton Public School	Leeton	Riverina	1913	34°32′47.15″S 146°24′25.84″E	
Leeville Public School	Leeville	Northern Rivers	1913	28°55′52.22″S 153°0′15.72″E	
Leichhardt Public School	Leichhardt	Inner West	1891	33°53′3.43″S 151°9′29.25″E	
Lennox Head Public School	Lennox Head	Northern Rivers	1992	28°47′36.2″S 153°35′25.09″E	
Leonay Public School	Leonay	Western Sydney	1982	33°45′53.33″S 150°38′59.09″E	
Leppington Public School	Leppington	South West	1923	33°57′33.43″S 150°48′36.15″E	
Les Powell School	Mount Pritchard	South-western Sydney	1990	33°54′15.31″S 150°54′43.96″E	
Lethbridge Park Public School	Lethbridge Park	Greater West	1963	33°44′14.95″S 150°48′3.53″E	
Leumeah High School	Leumeah	South West	1977	34°3′15.37″S 150°50′50.27″E	
Leumeah Public School	Leumeah	South West	1959	34°2′58.03″S 150°50′25.28″E	
Leura Public School	Leura	Blue Mountains	1890	33°42′41.75″S 150°20′12.42″E	
Lewisham Public School	Lewisham	Inner West	1886	33°53′52.03″S 151°8′45.54″E	
Lidcombe Public School	Lidcombe	Greater West	1879	33°51′38.58″S 151°2′51.41″E	
Lightning Ridge Central School	Lightning Ridge	North West Slopes	1896	29°25′33.77″S 147°58′45.54″E	
Lilli Pilli Public School	Lilli Pilli	Southern Sydney	1957	34°3′59.45″S 151°7′4.43″E	
Lincoln School	Dubbo	Orana	2000	32°13′50″S 148°34′39″E	
Lindfield East Public School	East Lindfield	Upper North Shore	1978	33°46′3.66″S 151°11′4.48″E	
Lindfield Public School	Lindfield	Upper North Shore	1903	33°46′51.5″S 151°10′9.54″E	
Lindsay Park Public School	Dundas Valley	Greater West	1978	34°25′45″S 150°51′42″E	
Lisarow High School	Lisarow	Central Coast	1991	33°23′8.64″S 151°22′12.12″E	
Lisarow Public School	Lisarow	Central Coast	1921	33°22′50.59″S 151°22′31.01″E	
Lismore Heights Public School	Lismore Heights	Northern Rivers	1955	28°48′23.89″S 153°18′1.93″E	
Lismore High School	East Lismore	Northern Rivers	1920	28°49′15.02″S 153°17′48.69″E	
Lismore Public School	Lismore	Northern Rivers	1882	28°48′52.31″S 153°17′26.99″E	
Lismore South Public School	South Lismore	Northern Rivers	1884	28°48′33.77″S 153°15′42.06″E	
Lithgow High School	Lithgow	Central Tablelands	1889	33°29′10.07″S 150°9′54.11″E	
Lithgow Public School	Lithgow	Central Tablelands	1875	33°28′55.92″S 150°9′36.77″E	
Liverpool Boys High School	Liverpool	South West	1955	33°55′3.99″S 150°55′57.13″E	
Liverpool Girls High School	Liverpool	South West	1955	33°55′4.43″S 150°55′50.18″E	
Liverpool Hospital School	Liverpool	South West	1973	33°55′13.45″S 150°55′47.95″E	
Liverpool Public School	Liverpool	South West	1863	33°55′26.92″S 150°55′31.63″E	
Liverpool West Public School	Liverpool	South West	1958	33°55′33.71″S 150°54′28.23″E	
Llandilo Public School	Llandilo	Greater West	1866	33°42′27.25″S 150°45′6.52″E	
Lochinvar Public School	Lochinvar	Hunter	1852	32°41′59.47″S 151°27′5.8″E	
Lockhart Central School	Lockhart	Riverina	1897	35°13′22.09″S 146°42′52.34″E	
Loftus Public School	Loftus	Southern Sydney	1959	34°2′49.12″S 151°2′56.33″E	
Lomandra School	Campbelltown	South Western Sydney	1998	34°3′42.01″S 150°49′27.7″E	
Londonderry Public School	Londonderry	Greater Western Sydney	1998	33°38′48.4″S 150°44′9.25″E	
Long Flat Public School	Long Flat	Mid North Coast	1933	31°26′16.23″S 152°29′12.39″E	
Longneck Lagoon Environmental Education Centre	Maraylya	Greater West	1977	33°34′49.1″S 150°53′38.56″E	
Lord Howe Island Central School	Lord Howe Island	Mid North Coast	1879	31°31′47.72″S 159°4′9.29″E	
Louth Public School	Louth	Far West	1879	30°32′7.61″S 145°7′1.91″E	
Lowanna Public School	Lowanna	Mid North Coast	1912	30°12′26.16″S 152°53′58.23″E	
Lowesdale Public School	Lowesdale	Riverina	1882	35°51′21.83″S 146°22′7.31″E	
Lucas Gardens School	Canada Bay	South West	1985	33°52′7.21″S 151°6′50.35″E	
Lucas Heights Community School	Barden Ridge	Southern Sydney	1992	34°2′9.88″S 151°0′21.58″E	
Luddenham Public School	Luddenham	Greater West	1860	33°52′52.17″S 150°41′30.63″E	
Lue Public School	Lue	Central West	1871	32°39′22.19″S 149°50′41.2″E	
Lugarno Public School	Lugarno	Southern Sydney	1933	33°59′6.89″S 151°2′43.34″E	
Lurnea High School	Lurnea	South West	1965	33°56′27.65″S 150°53′47.14″E	
Lurnea Public School	Lurnea	South West	1965	33°55′54.96″S 150°53′35.17″E	
Lyndhurst Public School	Lyndhurst	Central West	1889	33°40′25.06″S 149°2′39.91″E	
Lynwood Park Public School	Blacktown	Greater West	1960	33°45′13.78″S 150°55′33.97″E	

== M ==
Name	Suburb/Town	Region	Opened	Coordinates	Ref
Macarthur Girls High School	Parramatta	Greater West	1934	33°48′45.47″S 151°0′45.68″E	
Macdonald Valley Public School	Central Macdonald	Hawkesbury	1845	33°19′13.47″S 150°58′18.49″E	
Macintyre High School	Inverell	North West Slopes	1974	29°46′5.69″S 151°7′49.06″E	
Macksville High School	Macksville	Mid North Coast	1950	30°42′45.67″S 152°54′59.36″E	
Macksville Public School	Macksville	Mid North Coast	1875	30°42′29.96″S 152°55′2.15″E	
Maclean High School	Maclean	Northern Rivers	1961	29°27′57.54″S 153°12′8.65″E	
Maclean Public School	Maclean	Northern Rivers	1865	29°27′26.9″S 153°12′2.77″E	
Macquarie Fields Public School	Macquarie Fields	Macarthur	1957	33°59′41.94″S 150°52′54.54″E	
Macquarie Fields High School	Macquarie Fields	Macarthur	1981	33°59′41.98″S 150°52′54.5″E	
Madang Avenue Public School	Whalan	Greater West	1973	33°45′34.36″S 150°48′19.03″E	
Maimuru Public School	Maimuru	Central West	1921	34°14′36.43″S 148°12′53.62″E	
Main Arm Upper Public School	Upper Main Arm	Northern Rivers	1927	28°29′55.71″S 153°24′44.89″E	
Mainsbridge School	Warwick Farm	Greater West	1964	33°54′34.51″S 150°55′41.56″E	
Maitland East Public School	East Maitland	Hunter	1858	32°44′55.16″S 151°35′5.29″E	
Maitland Grossmann High School	East Maitland	Hunter	1858	32°44′55.13″S 151°35′5.29″E	
Maitland High School	East Maitland	Hunter	1884	32°44′50.32″S 151°35′50.29″E	
Maitland Public School	Maitland	Hunter	1858	32°44′7.64″S 151°33′13.87″E	
Malabar Public School	Malabar	Eastern Sydney	1905	33°57′43.82″S 151°14′54.6″E	
Mallawa Public School	Mallawa	Western Plains	1959	29°38′44.02″S 149°26′18.95″E	
Mandurama Public School	Mandurama	Central West	1876	33°39′5.96″S 149°4′10.25″E	
Manifold Public School	Bentley	Northern Rivers	1929	28°44′55.67″S 153°4′37.79″E	
Manildra Public School	Manildra	Central West	1882	33°11′2.27″S 148°42′4.3″E	
Manilla Central School	Manilla	New England	1877	30°44′56.09″S 150°43′27.78″E	
Manly Vale Public School	Manly Vale	Northern Beaches	1955	33°47′1.22″S 151°15′37.36″E	
Manly Village Public School	Manly	Northern Beaches	1858	33°47′56.21″S 151°17′14.77″E	
Manly West Public School	Balgowlah	Northern Beaches	1922	33°47′31.79″S 151°16′7.2″E	
Mannering Park Public School	Mannering Park	Central Coast	1961	33°9′3.01″S 151°32′13.01″E	
Manning Gardens Public School	Taree	Mid North Coast	1984	31°53′32.22″S 152°27′39.44″E	
Maraylya Public School	Maraylya	Greater West	1868	33°35′36.2″S 150°54′57.28″E	
Marayong Heights Public School	Marayong	Greater West	1961	33°44′31.32″S 150°53′49.12″E	
Marayong Public School	Marayong	Greater West	1959	33°45′24.94″S 150°53′43.07″E	
Marayong South Public School	Marayong	Greater West	1959	33°45′38.59″S 150°53′5.17″E	
Marie Bashir Public School	Strathfield	Inner West	2014	33°52′29.57″S 151°4′44.23″E	
Marks Point Public School	Marks Point	Hunter	1954	33°3′27.56″S 151°38′58.92″E	
Maroota Public School	Maroota	Hawkesbury	1891	33°27′17.36″S 150°59′38.77″E	
Maroubra Bay Public School	Maroubra	Eastern Sydney	1923	33°56′40.61″S 151°15′6.58″E	
Maroubra Junction Public School	Maroubra	Eastern Sydney	1913	33°56′10.32″S 151°14′25.09″E	
Marra Creek Public School	Marra Creek	Western Plains	1971	30°52′41.78″S 147°22′26.81″E	
Marrar Public School	Marrar	Riverina	1909	34°49′41.32″S 147°21′16.78″E	
Marrickville High School	Marrickville	Inner West	1974	33°54′20.32″S 151°9′21.98″E	
Marrickville Public School	Marrickville	Inner West	1864	33°54′21.21″S 151°9′45.19″E	
Marrickville West Public School	Marrickville	Inner West	1886	33°54′51.4″S 151°8′45.28″E	
Marsden High School	Meadowbank	Northern Sydney	1959	33°48′45.71″S 151°5′31.19″E	
Marsden Park Public School	Marsden Park	Greater West	1889	33°41′47.23″S 150°50′1″E	
Marsden Road Public School	Liverpool	Greater West	1962	33°55′0.86″S 150°54′52.3″E	
Martindale Public School	Martindale	Hunter	1885	32°27′31.19″S 150°39′57.48″E	
Martins Creek Public School	Martins Creek	Hunter	1892	32°33′57.38″S 151°37′24.76″E	
Martins Gully Public School	Martins Gully	New England	1923	30°31′28.01″S 151°38′13.57″E	
Marton Public School	Engadine	Southern Sydney	1973	34°2′49.13″S 151°1′28.13″E	
Marulan Public School	Marulan	Southern Highlands	1860	34°42′46.24″S 150°0′22.04″E	
Mary Brooksbank School	Rosemeadow	Macarthur	1987	34°5′52.19″S 150°47′33.82″E	
Maryland Public School	Maryland	Hunter	1992	32°52′53.54″S 151°39′30.76″E	
Mascot Public School	Mascot	Inner South	1922	33°55′44.61″S 151°11′35.38″E	
Mathoura Public School	Mathoura	Southern Riverina	1877	35°48′57.05″S 144°54′9.04″E	
Matong Public School	Matong	Riverina	1899	34°46′11.15″S 146°55′39.92″E	
Matraville Public School	Matraville	Eastern Sydney	1904	33°57′18.37″S 151°13′45.9″E	
Matraville Soldiers' Settlement Public School	Matraville	Eastern Sydney	1927	33°57′28.93″S 151°14′23.92″E	
Matraville Sports High School	Chifley	Eastern Sydney	1960	33°57′51.5″S 151°14′39″E	
Matthew Pearce Public School	Baulkham Hills	Hills District	1982	33°45′30.2″S 150°57′48.6″E	
Mawarra Public School	Elderslie	Macarthur	1972	34°3′41.79″S 150°42′43.19″E	
Mayfield East Public School	Mayfield East	Hunter	1858	32°53′45.4″S 151°44′56.29″E	
Mayfield West Public School	Mayfield West	Hunter	1925	32°53′18.49″S 151°43′49.22″E	
Mayrung Public School	Mayrung	Riverina	1884	35°27′51.11″S 145°18′34.2″E	
McCallums Hill Public School	Roselands	South West	1927	33°56′4.97″S 151°5′6.44″E	
Meadow Flat Public School	Meadow Flat	Central West	1856	33°26′2.66″S 149°55′15.17″E	
Meadowbank Public School	Meadowbank	Northern Sydney	1950	33°48′45.55″S 151°5′31.28″E	
Medlow Public School	Upper Taylors Arm	Mid North Coast	1903	30°46′45.59″S 152°41′25.24″E	
Medowie Public School	Medowie	Hunter	1894	32°44′21.23″S 151°51′15.32″E	
Megalong Public School	Megalong	Blue Mountains	1892	33°42′54.53″S 150°13′56.11″E	
Melrose Park Public School	Melrose Park	Northern Sydney	1945	33°48′53.59″S 151°4′18.89″E	
Melville High School	Broadmeadow	Hunter	1977	31°5′23″S 152°49′27″E	
Menai High School	Illawong	Southern Sydney	1988	34°0′9.5″S 151°1′25.85″E	
Menai Public School	Menai	Southern Sydney	1902	34°0′43.71″S 151°0′23.6″E	
Mendooran Central School	Mendooran	Central West	1869	31°49′5.72″S 149°7′23.82″E	
Menindee Central School	Menindee	Far West	1868	32°23′40.28″S 142°24′48.88″E	
Merewether Heights Public School	Merewether Heights	Hunter	1970	32°56′48.73″S 151°44′14.47″E	
Merewether High School	Broadmeadow	Hunter	1977	32°55′45.76″S 151°44′7.41″E	
Merewether Public School	Merewether	Hunter	1891	32°56′15.12″S 151°44′31.76″E	
Merimbula Public School	Merimbula	Far South Coast	1870	36°53′10.93″S 149°55′1.59″E	
Merriwa Central School	Merriwa	Hunter	1850	32°8′42.93″S 150°21′8.18″E	
Merrylands East Public School	Merrylands	South West	1928	33°50′31.16″S 150°59′21.74″E	
Merrylands High School	Merrylands	Greater West	1959	33°50′24.57″S 150°58′2.44″E	
Merrylands Public School	Merrylands	Greater West	1886	33°50′26.93″S 150°58′31.79″E	
Metella Road Public School	Toongabbie	Greater West	1972	33°47′40.25″S 150°56′8.8″E	
Metford Public School	Metford	Hunter	1980	32°45′54.34″S 151°36′45.74″E	
Mian School	Dubbo	Orana	2001	32°15′6.34″S 148°36′25.64″E	
Michelago Public School	Michelago	Monaro	1868	35°42′21.6″S 149°9′42.31″E	
Middle Dural Public School	Middle Dural	Hills District	1891	33°38′39.59″S 151°1′22″E	
Middle Harbour Public School	Mosman	Lower North Shore	1916	33°49′24.4″S 151°13′59.06″E	
Middleton Public School	Parkes	Central West	1957	33°8′51.95″S 148°10′22.94″E	
Milbrodale Public School	Milbrodale	Hunter	1921	32°41′46.13″S 151°0′18.25″E	
Miller Technology High School	Miller	South West	1965	33°55′25.61″S 150°52′48.62″E	
Miller Public School	Miller	South West	1963	33°55′18.39″S 150°52′37.83″E	
Millers Forest Public School	Millers Forest	Hunter	1883	32°45′7.46″S 151°42′14.8″E	
Millfield Public School	Millfield	Hunter	1868	32°53′20.98″S 151°15′2.36″E	
Millthorpe Public School	Millthorpe	Central West	1867	33°26′41.59″S 149°11′8.39″E	
Milperra Public School	Milperra	South West	1918	33°56′28.6″S 150°58′45.58″E	
Milton Public School	Milton	South Coast	1878	35°18′53.03″S 150°26′5.68″E	
Mimosa Public School	Frenchs Forest	Northern Beaches	1970	33°44′36.68″S 151°12′17.87″E	
Minchinbury Public School	Minchinbury	Greater West	1988	33°47′18.9″S 150°49′56.48″E	
Minerva School	Sutherland	Southern Sydney	2025	34°2′5.56″S 151°3′30.62″E	
Mingoola Public School	Mingoola	New England		29°0′18.44″S 151°32′33.46″E	
Minmi Public School	Minmi	Hunter	1861	32°52′35.57″S 151°37′4.28″E	
Minnamurra Public School	Minnamurra	Illawarra	1976	34°37′29.8″S 150°51′11.29″E	
Minto Public School	Minto	Macarthur	1867	34°1′47.42″S 150°50′51.17″E	
Miranda North Public School	Miranda	Southern Sydney	1957	34°1′52.04″S 151°6′46.54″E	
Miranda Public School	Miranda	Southern Sydney	1893	34°2′4.45″S 151°5′50.6″E	
Mitchell High School	Blacktown	Greater West	1964	33°47′7.07″S 150°54′55.99″E	
Mitchells Island Public School	Mitchells Island	Mid North Coast	1869	31°53′49″S 152°36′47″E	
Mittagong Public School	Mittagong	Southern Highlands	1865	34°26′52.95″S 150°26′41.32″E	
Moama Public School	Moama	Riverina	1866	36°6′52.97″S 144°45′47.99″E	
Modanville Public School	Modanville	Northern Rivers	1928	28°43′46.45″S 153°17′49.58″E	
Model Farms High School	Baulkham Hills	Hills District	1975	33°46′8.74″S 150°58′14.54″E	
Mogo Public School	Mogo	South Coast	1869	35°47′8.49″S 150°8′25.97″E	
Molong Central School	Molong	Central West	1859	33°5′52.11″S 148°51′47.87″E	
Mona Vale Public School	Mona Vale	Northern Beaches	1906	33°40′34.97″S 151°18′3.27″E	
Monaro High School	Cooma North	Snowy Mountains	1954	36°12′59.39″S 149°7′55.96″E	
Monteagle Public School	Monteagle	South West Slopes	1882	34°11′37″S 148°20′49″E	
Moonbi Public School	Moonbi, New South Wales	New England	1882	31°1′8.61″S 151°4′28.21″E	
Moorebank High School	Chipping Norton	South West	1975	33°55′32.14″S 150°57′28.16″E	
Moorefield Girls High School	Kogarah	Southern Sydney	1957	33°58′7.16″S 151°8′11.73″E	
Moorland Public School	Moorland	Mid North Coast	1882	31°46′11.57″S 152°39′5.56″E	
Moree East Public School	Moree	North West Slopes	1959	29°28′36.92″S 149°50′23.67″E	
Moree Public School	Moree	North West Slopes	1872	29°27′57.54″S 149°50′15.69″E	
Moree Secondary College – Albert St Campus	Moree	North West Slopes	2002	29°27′57.14″S 149°50′32.65″E	
Moree Secondary College – Carol Ave Campus	Moree	North West Slopes	1972	29°28′54.47″S 149°50′24.46″E	
Morgan Street Public School	Broken Hill	Far West	1917	31°56′29.74″S 141°27′39.24″E	
Morisset High School	Morisset	Hunter	1965	33°6′16.82″S 151°29′16.19″E	
Morisset Public School	Morisset	Hunter	1891	33°6′11.69″S 151°29′19.44″E	
Morpeth Public School	Morpeth	Hunter	1862	32°43′33.17″S 151°37′54.6″E	
Mortdale Public School	Mortdale	Southern Sydney	1889	33°58′19.93″S 151°4′52.29″E	
Mortlake Public School	Mortlake	Inner West	1889	33°50′56.2″S 151°6′14.26″E	
Moruya High School	Moruya	South Coast	1889	35°55′10.3″S 150°4′50.71″E	
Moruya Public School	Moruya	South Coast	1879	35°54′46.14″S 150°4′32.31″E	
Mosman High School	Mosman	Lower North Shore	1961	33°49′46.06″S 151°14′37.67″E	
Mosman Public School	Mosman	Lower North Shore	1880	33°49′41.85″S 151°14′28.06″E	
Moss Vale High School	Moss Vale	Southern Highlands	1963	34°33′10.6″S 150°23′7.36″E	
Moss Vale Public School	Moss Vale	Southern Highlands	1868	34°33′1.95″S 150°21′59.05″E	
Moulamein Public School	Moulamein	Riverina	1867	35°5′21.92″S 144°2′1.56″E	
Mount Annan High School	Mount Annan	Macarthur	2003	34°3′26.99″S 150°45′40.18″E	
Mount Annan Public School	Mount Annan	Macarthur	1993	34°3′41.23″S 150°45′39.04″E	
Mount Austin High School	Mount Austin	Riverina	1964	35°8′31.12″S 147°21′14.97″E	
Mount Austin Public School	Mount Austin	Riverina	1959	35°8′7.94″S 147°21′7.78″E	
Mount Brown Public School	Dapto	Illawarra	1972	34°30′56.84″S 150°47′7.84″E	
Mount Colah Public School	Mount Colah	Upper North Shore	1953	33°40′20″S 151°6′56″E	
Mount Druitt Public School	Mount Druitt	Greater West	1961	33°45′50.66″S 150°48′44.81″E	
Mount George Public School	Mount George	Mid North Coast	1874	31°52′54.68″S 152°10′44.93″E	
Mount Hunter Public School	Mount Hunter	Macarthur	1859	34°4′18.5″S 150°38′11.45″E	
Mount Hutton Public School	Mount Hutton	Hunter	1955	32°58′38.29″S 151°40′7.83″E	
Mount Kanwary Public School	Osterley	Hunter	1927	32°43′27.22″S 151°41′56.84″E	
Mount Keira Public School	Mount Keira	Illawarra	1861	34°24′41.63″S 150°51′22.06″E	
Mount Kembla Public School	Mount Kembla	Illawarra	1859	34°25′55.9″S 150°49′3.24″E	
Mount Kuring-gai Public School	Mount Kuring-gai	Northern Sydney	1957	33°39′26.74″S 151°8′8.99″E	
Mount Lewis Infants School	Mount Lewis	South West	1952	33°54′58.46″S 151°3′0.98″E	
Mount Ousley Public School	Fairy Meadow	Illawarra	1959	34°23′55.96″S 150°53′17.5″E	
Mount Pleasant Public School	Mount Pleasant	Hunter	1880	32°24′32″S 151°11′17.12″E	
Mount Pritchard East Public School	Mount Pritchard	South West	1960	33°54′17.75″S 150°54′42.82″E	
Mount Pritchard Public School	Mount Pritchard	South West	1924	33°54′0.8″S 150°53′56.12″E	
Mount Riverview Public School	Mount Riverview	Blue Mountains	1971	33°43′47.23″S 150°37′57.09″E	
Mount St Thomas Public School	Mount Saint Thomas	Illawarra	1952	34°26′13.67″S 150°52′13.61″E	
Mount Terry Public School	Albion Park	Illawarra	1995	34°35′30.4″S 150°46′46.64″E	
Mount Victoria Public School	Mount Victoria	Blue Mountains	1868	33°35′30.85″S 150°15′13.15″E	
Mount View High School	West Cessnock	Hunter	1985	32°49′40.97″S 151°19′59.85″E	
Mount Warrigal Public School	Mount Warrigal	Illawarra	1967	34°33′13.94″S 150°50′40.8″E	
Mowbray Public School	Lane Cove North	North Shore	1952	33°48′15.38″S 151°9′18.98″E	
Mudgee High School	Mudgee	Central West	1916	32°35′49.01″S 149°34′59.29″E	
Mudgee Public School	Mudgee	Central West	1855	32°35′48.02″S 149°35′1.69″E	
Muirfield High School	North Rocks, New South Wales	Greater West	1976	33°45′54.24″S 151°1′18.13″E	
Mulbring Public School	Mulbring	Hunter	1849	32°54′4.42″S 151°28′45.03″E	
Mulgoa Public School	Mulgoa	Greater West	1976	33°50′10.69″S 150°39′4.07″E	
Mullaley Public School	Mullaley	North West Slopes	1885	31°5′55.85″S 149°54′24.59″E	
Mullaway Public School	Mullaway	Mid North Coast	1994	30°4′41.9″S 153°11′23.18″E	
Mullengandra Public School	Mullengandra	Riverina	1871	35°54′1.84″S 147°9′52.25″E	
Mullion Creek Public School	Mullion Creek	Central West	1881	33°8′20.41″S 149°7′14.26″E	
Mullumbimby High School	Mullumbimby	Northern Rivers	1955	28°33′31.54″S 153°29′41.25″E	
Mullumbimby Public School	Mullumbimby	Northern Rivers	1886	28°33′7.27″S 153°30′21.37″E	
Mulwala Public School	Mulwala	Riverina	1868	35°59′15.51″S 146°0′24.92″E	
Mulwaree High School	Goulburn	Southern Tablelands	1971	34°43′49.04″S 149°43′43.75″E	
Mulyan Public School	Cowra	Central West	1953	33°49′20.46″S 148°41′17.6″E	
Mumbil Public School	Mumbil	Central West	1881	32°43′21.89″S 149°3′9.05″E	
Mummulgum Public School	Mummulgum	Northern Rivers	1901	28°50′53.15″S 152°48′4.19″E	
Mungindi Central School	Mungindi	North West Slopes	1893	28°58′48.01″S 148°59′25.28″E	
Murray Farm Public School	Carlingford	Greater West	1969	33°45′58.8″S 151°2′22.49″E	
Murray High School, Lavington	Lavington	Riverina	1976	36°2′4.22″S 146°56′44.72″E	
Murringo Public School	Murringo	South Western Slopes	1860	34°17′50.62″S 148°30′54.71″E	
Murrumburrah High School	Murrumburrah	South Western Slopes	1971	34°33′34.6″S 148°22′12.29″E	
Murrumburrah Public School	Murrumburrah	South Western Slopes	1883	34°33′5.98″S 148°21′32.57″E	
Murrurundi Public School	Murrurundi	Upper Hunter	1849	31°45′47.11″S 150°49′55.73″E	
Murwillumbah East Public School	Murwillumbah	Northern Rivers	1958	28°19′18.22″S 153°24′20″E	
Murwillumbah High School	Murwillumbah	Northern Rivers	1929	28°20′4.96″S 153°23′26.12″E	
Murwillumbah Public School	Murwillumbah	Northern Rivers	1929	28°20′4.96″S 153°23′26.08″E	
Murwillumbah South Infants School	South Murwillumbah	Northern Rivers	1954	28°20′24.55″S 153°23′59.78″E	
Muswellbrook High School	Muswellbrook	Upper Hunter	1952	32°16′7.49″S 150°53′51.79″E	
Muswellbrook Public School	Muswellbrook, New South Wales	Upper Hunter	1862	32°15′31.6″S 150°53′42.91″E	
Muswellbrook South Public School	Muswellbrook, New South Wales	Upper Hunter	1952	32°16′24.16″S 150°53′27.23″E	

== N ==
Name	Suburb/Town	Region	Opened	Coordinates	Ref
Nabiac Public School	Nabiac	Mid North Coast	1884	32°5′50.51″S 152°22′54.62″E	
Nambucca Heads High School	Nambucca Heads	Mid North Coast	1992	30°38′26.76″S 152°59′9.88″E	
Nambucca Heads Public School	Nambucca Heads	Mid North Coast	1884	30°38′30.24″S 153°0′19.5″E	
Nana Glen Public School	Nana Glen	Mid North Coast	1892	30°8′6.01″S 153°0′19.9″E	
Nangus Public School	Nangus	Riverina	1935	35°3′12.74″S 147°54′31.05″E	
Naradhan Public School	Naradhan	Central West	1929	30°20′41″S 149°45′46″E	
Narara Public School	Lisarow	Central Coast	1889	33°23′14.39″S 151°21′45.64″E	
Narara Valley High School	Narara	Central Coast	1991	33°23′57.04″S 151°20′2.71″E	
Nareena Hills Public School	Figtree	Illawarra	1977	34°25′34.35″S 150°50′49.46″E	
Narellan Public School	Narellan	Macarthur	1875	34°2′32.23″S 150°44′1.09″E	
Narellan Vale Public School	Narellan Vale	Macarthur	1997	34°3′21.99″S 150°44′42.82″E	
Naremburn School	Naremburn	North Shore	1887	33°49′10.19″S 151°12′1.61″E	
Narooma High School	Narooma	South Coast	1979	36°14′9.7″S 150°7′44.5″E	
Narooma Public School	Narooma	South Coast	1889	36°13′9.39″S 150°8′16.02″E	
Narrabeen Lakes Public School	Narrabeen	Northern Beaches	1889	33°43′14.67″S 151°17′52.27″E	
Narrabeen North Public School	North Narrabeen	Northern Beaches	1939	33°41′55.91″S 151°17′51.79″E	
Narrabeen Sports High School	North Narrabeen	Northern Beaches	1976	33°42′3.21″S 151°17′50.76″E	
Narrabri High School	Narrabri	North West Slopes	1956	30°20′6.71″S 149°46′54.5″E	
Narrabri Public School	Narrabri	North West Slopes	1868	30°19′29.06″S 149°47′5.71″E	
Narrabri West Public School	Narrabri	North West Slopes	1868	30°20′41″S 149°45′46″E	
Narrandera East Infants School	Narrandera	Riverina	1961	34°45′1.25″S 146°33′56.8″E	
Narrandera High School	Narrandera	Riverina	1947	34°44′33.8″S 146°33′55.34″E	
Narrandera Public School	Narrandera	Riverina	1873	34°44′41.08″S 146°32′49.22″E	
Narranga Public School	Western Coffs Harbour	Mid North Coast	1968	30°17′31.65″S 153°6′12.85″E	
Narraweena Public School	Narraweena	Northern Beaches	1951	33°44′58.17″S 151°16′27.56″E	
Narromine High School	Narromine	Orana	1947	32°13′46.9″S 148°14′31.19″E	
Narromine Public School	Narromine	Orana	1883	32°13′48.31″S 148°14′41.18″E	
Narwee High School	Narwee	South West	1958	33°53′6″S 151°1′25″E	
Narwee Public School	Narwee	St George	1950	33°56′53.66″S 151°4′7.42″E	
Nashdale Public School	Nashdale	Central West	1888	33°17′39.57″S 149°0′45.04″E	
Nemingha Public School	Nemingha	New England	1877	31°7′38″S 151°0′14.54″E	
Nepean Creative and Performing Arts High School	Emu Plains	Greater West	1963	33°44′54.11″S 150°40′10.63″E	
Neutral Bay Public School	Neutral Bay	Lower North Shore	1886	33°49′55.82″S 151°13′11.77″E	
Neville Public School	Neville	Central West	1858	33°42′34.3″S 149°13′0.11″E	
New Lambton Heights Infants School	New Lambton Heights	Hunter	1951	32°56′5.02″S 151°41′20.06″E	
New Lambton Public School	New Lambton	Hunter	1880	32°55′20.77″S 151°42′44.23″E	
New Lambton South Public School	New Lambton	Hunter	1950	32°55′51″S 151°43′1″E	
Newbridge Heights Public School	Chipping Norton	Greater West	1977	33°55′32.68″S 150°57′7.33″E	
Newcastle East Public School	Newcastle East	Hunter	1816	32°55′48.91″S 151°46′36.47″E	
Newcastle High School	Newcastle West	Hunter	1976	32°55′56.2″S 151°45′27.94″E	
Newcastle Senior School	Waratah	Hunter	1939	32°54′32.62″S 151°43′23.72″E	
Newcastle Middle School	Waratah	Hunter	1981	32°54′35.54″S 151°43′12.21″E	
Newcastle Junior School	Hillsborough	Hunter	1982	32°57′30.76″S 151°40′50.09″E	
Newington Public School	Newington	Greater West	2002	33°50′28.19″S 151°3′19.12″E	
Newling Public School	Newling	New England	1974	30°31′21.12″S 151°40′34.69″E	
Newport Public School	Newport	Northern Beaches	1888	33°39′36.43″S 151°18′45.29″E	
Newrybar Public School	Newrybar	Northern Rivers	1890	28°43′2.82″S 153°31′58.2″E	
Newtown High School of the Performing Arts	Newtown	Inner West	1990	33°53′55.88″S 151°10′42.04″E	
Newtown North Public School	Newtown	Inner West	1883	33°53′29.8″S 151°11′7.19″E	
Newtown Public School	Newtown	Inner West	1863	33°53′59.74″S 151°10′46.12″E	
Niagara Park Public School	Niagara Park	Central Coast	1974	33°23′1.81″S 151°21′2.92″E	
Niangala Public School	Niangala	New England	1891	31°17′53″S 151°24′27″E	
Nicholson Street Public School	Balmain East	Inner West	1883	33°51′21.07″S 151°11′33.94″E	
Niland School	Blackett	Great West	1972	33°44′11.28″S 150°48′48.88″E	
Nillo Infants School	Lorn	Hunter	1920	32°43′38.67″S 151°33′34.58″E	
Nimbin Central School	Nimbin	Northern Rivers	1891	28°35′43.21″S 153°13′12.28″E	
Nimmitabel Public School	Nimmitabel	Monaro	1869	36°30′38.59″S 149°17′21.47″E	
NSW School of Languages	Petersham	Inner West	1991	33°53′42.07″S 151°9′3.08″E	
Nords Wharf Public School	Nords Wharf	Hunter	1901	33°8′8.89″S 151°36′14.15″E	
Normanhurst Boys' High School	Normanhurst	Upper North Shore	1958	33°43′19.04″S 151°6′6.19″E	
Normanhurst Public School	Normanhurst	Upper North Shore	1872	33°43′25.47″S 151°5′50.7″E	
Normanhurst West Public School	Thornleigh	Upper North Shore	1961	33°43′17.75″S 151°5′17.03″E	
North East Public School of Distance Education	Port Macquarie	Mid North Coast	2004	31°25′48.35″S 152°54′46.85″E	
North Haven Public School	North Haven	Mid North Coast	1957	31°38′3.88″S 152°49′18.78″E	
North Kellyville Public School	North Kellyville	Hills District	2019	33°41′29.8″S 150°57′16.55″E	
North Nowra Public School	North Nowra	South Coast, New South Wales	1998	34°51′18.47″S 150°34′32.33″E	
North Rocks Public School	North Rocks	Hills District	1923	33°46′6.7″S 151°1′32.02″E	
North Ryde Public School	North Ryde	Northern Sydney	1876	33°47′40.48″S 151°7′14.33″E	
North Star Public School	North Star	Northern Tablelands	1939	28°55′36.94″S 150°23′33.65″E	
North Sydney Boys High School	Crows Nest	Lower North Shore	1912	33°49′46.25″S 151°12′27.62″E	
North Sydney Demonstration School	Waverton	Lower North Shore	1874	33°50′6.4″S 151°12′14.72″E	
North Sydney Girls High School	Crows Nest	Lower North Shore	1914	33°49′48.91″S 151°12′11.95″E	
North Wagga Public School	North Wagga	Riverina	1880	35°5′47.94″S 147°22′45.17″E	
Northbridge Public School	Northbridge	Lower North Shore	1923	33°48′44.32″S 151°13′7.91″E	
Northern Beaches Secondary College - Balgowlah Boys Campus	Balgowlah	Northern Beaches	1954	33°47′47.87″S 151°15′17.02″E	
Northern Beaches Secondary College – Cromer Campus	Cromer	Northern Beaches	1976	33°44′15.74″S 151°17′3.19″E	
Northern Beaches Secondary College – Freshwater Senior Campus	Curl Curl	Northern Beaches	2003	33°46′5.22″S 151°16′47.89″E	
Northern Beaches Secondary College – Mackellar Girls Campus	Manly Vale	Northern Beaches	1968	33°46′53.45″S 151°16′17.89″E	
Northern Beaches Secondary College – Manly Campus	North Curl Curl	Northern Beaches	1983	33°45′47.75″S 151°16′52.58″E	
Northlakes High School	San Remo	Central Coast	1981	33°12′59.96″S 151°30′51.13″E	
Northlakes Public School	San Remo	Central Coast	1991	33°12′52.67″S 151°30′53.44″E	
Northmead High School	Northmead	Greater West	1959	33°47′19.27″S 150°59′59.76″E	
Northmead Public School	Northmead	Greater West	1924	33°47′9.84″S 150°59′27.64″E	
Nouméa Public School	Shalvey, New South Wales	Greater West	1978	33°43′56.45″S 150°48′35.36″E	
Nowendoc Public School	Nowendoc	Northern Tablelands	1868	31°28′58.92″S 151°42′56.95″E	
Nowra East Public School	Nowra	South Coast	1964	34°52′59.72″S 150°36′27.93″E	
Nowra High School	Nowra	South Coast	1956	34°52′16.42″S 150°36′36.79″E	
Nowra Hill Public School	Nowra Hill	South Coast	1867	34°56′11.23″S 150°33′58.59″E	
Nulkaba Public School	Nulkaba	Hunter	1926	32°48′38.57″S 151°20′52.03″E	
Numeralla Public School	Numeralla	Monaro	1880	36°10′36.49″S 149°20′46.83″E	
Nundle Public School	Nundle	New England	1872	31°27′36.43″S 151°7′40.33″E	
Nuwarra Public School	Moorebank	Greater West	1974	33°55′59.67″S 150°57′5.34″E	
Nymboida Public School	Nymboida	Northern Rivers	1879	29°56′50.67″S 152°43′38.94″E	
Nyngan High School	Nyngan	Orana	1974	31°33′41.03″S 147°11′20.03″E	
Nyngan Public School	Nyngan	Orana	1882	31°33′41.03″S 147°11′20.03″E	

== O ==
Name	Suburb/Town	Region	Opened	Coordinates	Ref
O'Connell Public School	O'Connell	| Central West	1869	33°31′28.48″S 149°43′12.73″E	
Oak Flats High School	Oak Flats	Illawarra	1962	34°33′33.16″S 150°49′59.42″E	
Oak Flats Public School	Oak Flats	Illawarra	1952	34°33′44.53″S 150°49′3.24″E	
Oakdale Public School	Oakdale	Greater West	1871	34°4′46.36″S 150°30′30.49″E	
Oakhill Drive Public School	Castle Hill	Greater West	1992	33°43′18.63″S 151°1′23.56″E	
Oaklands Central School	Oaklands	Riverina	1885	35°33′7.75″S 146°10′12.01″E	
Oakville Public School	Oakville	Greater West	1900	33°37′11.56″S 150°52′12.73″E	
Oatlands Public School	Oatlands	Greater West	1957	33°48′0.46″S 151°1′21.08″E	
Oatley Public School	Oatley	Southern Sydney	1917	33°59′4.86″S 151°4′50.11″E	
Oatley West Public School	Oatley	Southern Sydney	1947	33°58′45.59″S 151°3′56.3″E	
Oberon High School	Oberon	Central Tablelands	1993	33°42′3.49″S 149°51′33.86″E	
Oberon Public School	Oberon	Central Tablelands	1872	33°42′13.33″S 149°51′48.85″E	
Observatory Hill Environmental Education Centre	The Rocks	Sydney City Central	1991	33°51′33.75″S 151°12′26.38″E	
Ocean Shores Public School	Ocean Shores	Northern Rivers	1893	28°29′27.7″S 153°32′28.41″E	
Old Bar Public School	Old Bar	Mid North Coast	1935	31°58′19.64″S 152°35′15.97″E	
Old Bonalbo Public School	Old Bonalbo	Northern Rivers	1920	28°39′16.34″S 152°35′50.06″E	
Old Guildford Public School	Old Guildford	Greater West	1869	33°52′3.26″S 150°59′12.04″E	
Orama Public School	Orama	Mid North Coast	1890	30°25′56.42″S 152°41′30.09″E	
Oran Park Public School	Oran Park	South West	2014	33°59′50.62″S 150°44′6.18″E	
Oran Park High School	Oran Park	South West	2020	33°59′55.30″S 150°44′11.00″E	
Orana Heights Public School	Dubbo	Orana	1983	32°15′13.42″S 148°37′38.09″E	
Orange East Public School	Orange East	Central West	1890	33°16′56.02″S 149°6′51.89″E	
Orange Grove Public School	Lilyfield	Inner West	1883	33°52′20.53″S 151°9′31.6″E	
Orange High School	Orange	Central West	1912	33°16′49.45″S 149°5′10.4″E	
Orange Public School	Orange	Central West	1852	33°17′7.93″S 149°5′46.93″E	
Orara High School	Coffs Harbour	Mid North Coast	1971	30°16′55.19″S 153°6′47.84″E	
Orara Upper Public School	Upper Orara	Mid North Coast	1891	30°17′19.33″S 153°0′48.23″E	
Orchard Hills Public School	Orchard Hills	Greater West	1910	33°46′56.03″S 150°43′17.77″E	
Otford Public School	Otford	Illawarra	1885	34°12′44.74″S 151°0′4.99″E	
Ourimbah Public School	Ourimbah	Central Coast	1863	33°21′16.99″S 151°22′9.13″E	
Oxley High School	North Tamworth	New England	1968	31°4′45.94″S 150°56′23.03″E	
Oxley Park Public School	Oxley Park	Greater West	1957	33°46′17.62″S 150°47′19.7″E	
Oxley Vale Public School	Oxley Vale	New England	1947	31°3′32.03″S 150°53′41.22″E	
Oyster Bay Public School	Oyster Bay	Southern Sydney	1944	34°0′28.88″S 151°4′51.94″E	

== P ==
Name	Suburb/Town	Region	Opened	Coordinates	Ref
Pacific Palms Public School	Boomerang Beach	Mid North Coast	1937	32°20′27.66″S 152°32′25.59″E	
Paddington Public School	Paddington	Sydney City Central	1856	33°53′15.5″S 151°13′48.13″E	
Padstow Heights Public School	Padstow Heights	South West	1954	33°57′58.39″S 151°1′51.13″E	
Padstow North Public School	Padstow	South West	1957	33°56′37.61″S 151°1′50.89″E	
Padstow Park Public School	Padstow	South-Western Sydney	1928	33°57′14.56″S 151°1′52.11″E	
Pagewood Public School	Pagewood	Eastern Sydney	1950	33°56′32.32″S 151°12′50.8″E	
Palinyewah Public School	Palinyewah	Far West	1954	33°50′40.15″S 142°0′48.02″E	
Pallamallawa Public School	Pallamallawa	Northern Tablelands	1884	29°28′25.58″S 150°8′25.59″E	
Palm Avenue School	Westmead	Greater West	1972	33°48′1.46″S 150°59′11.59″E	
Palmers Island Public School	Palmers Island	Northern Rivers	1866	29°25′13.4″S 153°17′14″E	
Pambula Public School	Pambula	South Coast	1849	36°55′32.15″S 149°52′18.49″E	
Panania North Public School	Panania	South West	1956	33°56′44.83″S 150°59′56.92″E	
Panania Public School	Panania	South West	1937	33°57′56.2″S 151°0′1.96″E	
Para Meadows School	North Wollongong	Illawarra	1953	34°24′42.07″S 150°53′18.16″E	
Parkes East Public School	Parkes	Central West	1962	33°8′10.65″S 148°11′23.09″E	
Parkes High School	Parkes	Central West	1933	33°8′19.55″S 148°10′50.54″E	
Parkes Public School	Parkes	Central West	1868	33°7′57.35″S 148°10′33.05″E	
Parklea Public School	Glenwood	Greater West	1919	33°43′33.89″S 150°56′5″E	
Parkview Public School	Parkview	Riverina	1971	34°33′42.84″S 146°23′45.5″E	
Parramatta East Public School	Parramatta	Greater West	1949	33°48′22.05″S 151°1′4.83″E	
Parramatta High School	Parramatta	Greater West	1913	33°49′4.71″S 150°59′46.01″E	
Parramatta North Public School	North Parramatta	Greater West	1852	33°48′14.18″S 151°0′16.59″E	
Parramatta Public School	Parramatta	Greater West	1873	33°49′0.54″S 151°0′30.58″E	
Parramatta West Public School	Parramatta	Greater West	1888	33°49′28.09″S 150°59′28.99″E	
Parry School	South Tamworth	New England	2001	31°6′22.4″S 150°55′16.48″E	
Passfield Park School	Minto	Greater West	1981	34°1′25.82″S 150°51′2.51″E	
Paterson Public School	Paterson	Hunter	1875	32°36′9.11″S 151°36′44.8″E	
Paxton Public School	Paxton	Hunter	1924	32°54′3.67″S 151°17′3.41″E	
Peak Hill Central School	Peak Hill	Central West	1890	32°43′40.75″S 148°11′29.95″E	
Peakhurst Public School	Peakhurst	Southern Sydney	1871	33°57′19.4″S 151°3′41.71″E	
Peakhurst South Public School	Peakhurst Heights	Southern Sydney	1963	33°58′21.2″S 151°3′18.65″E	
Peakhurst West Public School	Peakhurst	Southern Sydney	1955	33°57′43.81″S 151°2′58.22″E	
Peats Ridge Public School	Peats Ridge	Central Coast	1931	33°19′33.46″S 151°13′59.27″E	
Peel High School	Tamworth	New England	1976	31°5′55″S 150°53′35.14″E	
Pelaw Main Public School	Pelaw Main	Hunter	1903	32°49′53.96″S 151°29′4.67″E	
Pelican Flat Public School	Pelican	Hunter	1938	33°4′24.88″S 151°38′52.81″E	
Pendle Hill High School	Pendle Hill	Greater West	1965	33°47′41.51″S 150°57′50.01″E	
Pendle Hill Public School	Pendle Hill	Greater West	1955	33°48′37.04″S 150°57′14.3″E	
Pennant Hills High School	Pennant Hills	Northern Sydney	1966	33°44′0.32″S 151°3′45.05″E	
Pennant Hills Public School	Pennant Hills	Northern Sydney	1925	33°44′9.36″S 151°4′5.42″E	
Penrith Selective High School	Penrith	Greater West	1950	33°45′22.87″S 150°42′24.61″E	
Penrith Lakes Environmental Education Centre	Castlereagh	Greater West	1996	33°43′33.36″S 150°40′8.48″E	
Penrith Public School	Penrith	Greater West	1865	33°45′22.26″S 150°42′18.83″E	
Penrith South Public School	South Penrith	Greater West	1959	33°45′47.55″S 150°42′3.47″E	
Penrose Public School	Penrose	Southern Highlands	1891	34°40′9.14″S 150°13′16.87″E	
Penshurst Public School	Penshurst	St George	1925	33°57′47.31″S 151°5′16.97″E	
Penshurst West Public School	Penshurst	St George	1957	33°57′40.19″S 151°4′21.23″E	
Perthville Public School	Perthville	Central Tablelands	1865	33°29′27.95″S 149°32′59.65″E	
Peterborough School	Warilla	Illawarra	1973	34°33′21.28″S 150°51′17.29″E	
Petersham Public School	Petersham	Inner West	1878	33°53′44.35″S 151°9′0.46″E	
Picnic Point High School	Picnic Point	South-Western Sydney	1962	33°57′54.44″S 151°0′32.48″E	
Picnic Point Public School	Picnic Point	South West	1963	33°58′7.88″S 151°0′33.5″E	
Picton High School	Picton	Macarthur	1958	34°11′39.7″S 150°36′28.56″E	
Picton Public School	Picton	Macarthur	1868	34°10′34.96″S 150°36′33.31″E	
Pilliga Public School	Pilliga	New England	1883	30°21′7.32″S 148°53′20.69″E	
Pitt Town Public School	Pitt Town	Macarthur	1876	33°35′2.78″S 150°51′36.42″E	
Pittwater High School	Mona Vale	Northern Beaches	1963	33°40′6.19″S 151°18′9.11″E	
Plattsburg Public School	Wallsend	Hunter	1865	32°53′49.91″S 151°40′9.33″E	
Pleasant Heights Public School	Mount Pleasant	Illawarra	1969	34°23′45.98″S 150°52′23.77″E	
Pleasant Hills Public School	Pleasant Hills	Riverina	1891	35°28′0.24″S 146°47′58.12″E	
Plumpton High School	Plumpton	Greater West	1976	33°44′53.15″S 150°50′5.8″E	
Plumpton Public School	Plumpton	Greater West	1875	33°44′57.23″S 150°50′18.23″E	
Plunkett Street Public School	Woolloomooloo	Sydney City Central	1983	33°52′15.14″S 151°13′12.73″E	
Point Clare Public School	Point Clare	Central Coast	1955	33°26′36.92″S 151°19′39.52″E	
Pomona Public School	Pomona	Riverina	1921	34°1′32.98″S 141°53′39.47″E	
Pooncarie Public School	Pooncarie	Far West	1888	33°22′55.89″S 142°34′5.75″E	
Port Hacking High School	Miranda	South Eastern Sydney	1959	34°1′57.05″S 151°5′50.47″E	
Port Kembla Public School	Port Kembla	Illawarra	1890	34°29′11.86″S 150°54′53.93″E	
Port Macquarie Public School	Port Macquarie	Mid North Coast	1852	31°25′47.97″S 152°54′50.84″E	
Portland Central School	Portland	Central West	1884	33°21′18.13″S 149°58′47.68″E	
Pottsville Beach Public School	Pottsville	Northern Rivers	1944	28°22′40.74″S 153°34′3.97″E	
Prairievale Public School	Bossley Park	Greater West	1984	33°51′59.64″S 150°53′27.77″E	
Prairiewood High School	Prairiewood	Greater West	1984	33°51′33.63″S 150°54′9.48″E	
Premer Public School	Premer	North West	1881	31°27′14.14″S 149°54′4.26″E	
Prestons Public School	Prestons	South West	1926	33°56′45.72″S 150°53′27.56″E	
Pretty Beach Public School	Pretty Beach	Central Coast	1927	33°31′34.44″S 151°20′59.94″E	
Primbee Public School	Primbee	Illawarra	1938	34°30′3.82″S 150°52′55.4″E	
Punchbowl Boys High School	Punchbowl	South West	1955	33°55′25.93″S 151°3′10.15″E	
Punchbowl Public School	Punchbowl	South West	1922	33°55′51.16″S 151°3′23.05″E	
Putland School	Werrington	Greater West	1980	33°46′17.68″S 150°46′7.89″E	
Putney Public School	Putney	Northern Sydney	1921	33°49′28.73″S 151°6′38.76″E	
Pymble Public School	Pymble	Upper North Shore	1952	33°43′54.26″S 151°8′28.43″E	

== See also ==
Organsiations

- Education in New South Wales
- Education in Australia
- New South Wales Education Standards Authority
- Australian Curriculum

Lists

- List of schools in New South Wales
- List of government schools in New South Wales
- List of non-government schools in New South Wales
- List of selective high schools in New South Wales
- List of Catholic schools in New South Wales
- List of Anglican schools in New South Wales
- List of Islamic schools in New South Wales
- Lists of schools in Australia
