= Shannon Brook =

Shannon Brook Deep Creek (branch), Piora Creek, Mummulgum Creek
- Location of the Shannon Brook mouth in New South Wales
- Etymology: In honour of J. C. Shannon

Location
- Country: Australia
- State: New South Wales
- Region: NSW North Coast (IBRA), Northern Rivers
- LGA: Kyogle

Physical characteristics
- Source confluence: Theresa Creek and Deep Creek
  - location: near Mummulgum
  - elevation: 96 m (315 ft)
- Mouth: confluence with the Richmond River
  - location: near Tatham
  - coordinates: 28°55′27″S 153°9′37″E
  - elevation: 5 m (16 ft)
- Length: 58 km (36 mi)

Basin features
- River system: Richmond River catchment
- Tributaries
  - left: Rileys Creek
  - right: Mongogarie Creek

The Shannon Brook, a perennial stream of the Richmond River catchment, is located in Northern Rivers region in the state of New South Wales, Australia.

== Location and features ==
Formed by the confluence of the Theresa Creek and Deep Creek, Shannon Brook rises on the Richmond Range about 8 kilometres (5.0 mi) southwest of Mummulgum. The river flows generally northeast, east southeast and east, joined by two minor tributaries before reaching its confluence with the Richmond River near Tatham, about 13 kilometres (8.1 mi) southeast of Casino. The river descends 91 metres (299 ft) over its 58 kilometres (36 mi) course.

== Etymology ==
The river is believed to be named in honour of J. C. Shannon who came from the Clarence Valley and took up Stratheden for Dr. John Dobie in 1842. He camped by the creek, hence the name Shannon Brook. J. C. Shannon was known locally as Doc Shannon.

== See also ==
- Rivers of New South Wales
- List of rivers of New South Wales (L-Z)
- List of rivers of Australia
