= HKHS =

HKHS may refer to:

- Henry Kendall High School, a co-educational comprehensive secondary day school in Gosford, New South Wales, Australia
- Hong Kong Housing Society, the second largest public housing provider in Hong Kong
