= Moruya High School =

Location
- Albert Street, Moruya, South Coast, New South Wales; Australia
- Coordinates: 35°55′10″S 150°04′51″E

Information
- Type: Government-funded co-educational comprehensive secondary day school
- Motto: Latin: Vive Atque Disce (Live and Learn)
- School district: Batemans Bay
- Educational authority: NSW Department of Education
- Principal: Mark English
- Teaching staff: 60.0 FTE (2018)
- Years: 7–12
- Enrolment: 571 (2018)
- Newspaper: None, previously Live and Learn
- Website: moruya-h.schools.nsw.gov.au

Moruya High School is a government-funded co-educational comprehensive secondary day school, located in Moruya, in the South Coast region of New South Wales, Australia.

The school enrolled approximately 570 students in 2018, from Year 7 to Year 12, of whom 15 percent identified as Indigenous Australians and four percent were from a language background other than English. The school is operated by the NSW Department of Education; the principal is Mark English.

== See also ==
- List of government schools in New South Wales: G–P
- Education in Australia
