= Brian Jackson (rugby league) =

Australian rugby league footballer

Personal information
- Full name: Brian Jackson
- Born: 9 August 1966 (age 60) Australia

Playing information
- Weight: 12 st 11 lb (81 kg)
- Position: Wing, Centre, Stand-off
Club
Years	Team	Pld	T	G	FG	P
1985–91	Parramatta Eels	89	34	0	0	136
1989–90	Wakefield Trinity	17	3	0	0	12
1992	South Sydney	2	0	0	0	0
	Total	108	37	0	0	148

Brian Jackson (born 9 August 1966) is an Australian former professional rugby league footballer who played in the 1980s and 1990s. He played at club level for Parramatta Eels, Wakefield Trinity and South Sydney Rabbitohs, as a wing, centre, or five-eighth.

== Representative Highlights ==
1984 NSW Schoolboy Open, 1984 Rookie of the Year.

== Outside of rugby league ==
Brian Jackson was previously a physical education teacher at Model Farms High School, Baulkham Hills, New South Wales. As of 2026, he is teaches Physics and is involved in Administration Technology at Gosford High School, New South Wales.
