= Gosford High School =

- Gosford High School Logo

Location
- Gosford, Central Coast, New South Wales; Australia; 33°25′6″S 151°20′29″E

Information
- Type: Government co-educational academically selective secondary day school
- Motto: Latin: Spectemur agendo (Judge me by my actions)
- Established: 1928; 98 years ago; 98 years ago
- Educational authority: New South Wales Department of Education
- Principal: Michael Smith
- Teaching staff: 71.6 FTE (2025)
- Years: 7–12
- Enrolment: 1,067 (2025)
- Area: 4.3ha
- Campus type: Outer suburban
- Colours: Blue (Juniors, Yrs 7–10); White (Seniors, Yrs 10–12)
- Website: gosford-h.schools.nsw.gov.au

Gosford High School (abbreviated as GHS) is a government-funded co-educational academically selective secondary day school, located in Gosford, in the Central Coast region of New South Wales, Australia.

Established in 1928, the school enrolled approximately 1,067 students in 2025, from Year 7 to Year 12, of whom one percent identified as Indigenous Australians and sixty-three percent were from a language background other than English. The school is operated by the NSW Department of Education; the principal is Michael Smith.

== History ==
Gosford High School, operated by the New South Wales Department of Education, was established in 1928, the first secondary school in the Central Coast region, and became a selective high school in 1989. The original building was completed in 1929, and consisted of seven classrooms, one science laboratory and an assembly room. Students at the school primarily come from the Central Coast region, though students from the Sydney and Lake Macquarie regions comprise a significant portion of the population. As of 2026, Gosford High was the only fully selective school on the Central Coast, making admission very competitive.

== Motto ==
The school's Latin motto is spectemur agendo, which is conventionally translated into English as "Judge me by my actions" Other translations include Let us be judged by our acts and By our deeds may we be known.

== Staff ==
The principal of Gosford High School from 2006 to 2016 was Lynne Searle. She was replaced in 2017 by Tony Rudd, the former principal of Manly Selective Campus. Rudd retired at the beginning of the 2019 academic year with previous deputy Adrienne Scalese taking over the position temporarily. The position of principal was taken by former principal of Narara Valley High School Michael Smith as of the start of term 2 of the 2019 academic year.

Notable among the former staff are Mark Butler (now retired), recipient of the Prime Minister's Prize for Excellence in Science Teaching in Secondary Schools in 2004, who has been elected to the National Curriculum Board, Rebecca Donoghue, Head of Visual Arts, who received the Minister's Award for Excellence in Teaching in 2013 and Michael Chamberlain, who was falsely convicted with wife Lindy in the death of their daughter Azaria, later exonerated.

Notable among current staff are Brian Jackson, a Physics teacher who a former rugby league football player; and Katherine Barebler, Head of Science, who featureed as a World Teacher's Day Winner.

== Academic results ==
The table below shows the school's HSC ranking relative to other schools in NSW.

Year	Ranking	Distinguish Achievers (DA)	Exams Sat	DA Frequency (%)	Year 12 Students
2016	49	250	1003	24.9	180
2017	51	282	1065	26.5	194
2018	59	231	997	23.2	178
2019	52	263	977	26.9	176
2020	72	213	1025	20.8	202
2021	87	175	921	19.0	143
2022	54	252	1024	24.6	177
2023	65	222	971	22.9	171
2024	54	299	1149	26.0	176
2025	34	336	993	33.8	165

== Extracurricular and co-curricular ==
=== Music ===
Apart from the mandatory Music course in Year 8, the school has several music groups and programmes, including a Concert Band that has toured overseas in Hong Kong, New Zealand and Singapore. A school musical is held every two years. The school also hosts an annual Kerle Comp, in which students form bands to perform the music of Bobby King. There are two main school bands, the Concert Band and the Premier Ensemble.

=== Sport ===
The school holds annual swimming, athletics and cross country carnivals, with achieving students competing in higher level competitions run by the Sydney North School Sports Association. Within the school there are four sporting houses, named after prominent members of the local community and the Old Students Union.

- Kingsbury (red and white
- Rowe (black and white )
- Wheeler (green and yellow )
- OSU (brown and yellow )

Gosford and Orange High School have an annual school exchange program which has taken place since 1968. Each year sporting teams are selected from both Orange and Gosford High Schools to compete against each other for the Malynley Shield, the name Malynley being an acronym of Dews' family members who donated the shield.

=== Agriculture ===
Gosford High School shares a three-hectare agricultural farm with neighbouring Henry Kendall High School.

== Notable alumni ==
- John Brew – Public servant and engineer
- Pat Conroy – politician
- David Fairleigh – rugby league player and coach
- Adrian Goldsmith – World War II (1921–1961) flying ace
- Jack Grahame – (1933–2003) lawyer
- Chris Holstein – politician
- Caroline Jones – Journalist and broadcaster
- Daria Nina Love – Veterinary microbiologist
- Donald McGillivray – (1935–2012) botanical taxonomist
- Mary-Louise McLaws - Infectious disease epidemologist and AO Recipient
- Alan Ramsey – journalist
- June Ross – Geologist, paleontologist, biologist, and one of the first Australian women to obtain a PhD
- Daniel Patrick Russell – actor
- Arthur Tange – Secretary of DFAT and Department of Defence
- Felicity Ward – comedian
- Nina Wilson – musician

== See also ==
- List of government schools in New South Wales: G–P
- List of selective high schools in New South Wales
