= Jindabyne Central School =

Location
- 4 Park Road, Jindabyne, Snowy Mountains region, New South Wales; Australia; 36°24′58″S 148°37′15″E

Information
- Former name: Jindabyne Primary School
- Type: Government-funded co-educational primary and comprehensive secondary day school
- Motto: Leadership and Citizenship
- Established: (as Jindabyne Primary School)
- School district: Eden–Monaro; Rural South and West
- Educational authority: NSW Department of Education
- Principal: Steve McAlister – Primary; Michael Kowalewski – Secondary (Relieving)
- Teaching staff: 60.3 FTE (2018)
- Years: K–12
- Enrolment: 882 (2018)
- Campus: Regional
- Slogan: Educating the Future
- Website: jindabyne-c.schools.nsw.gov.au

Jindabyne Central School (JCS) is a government-funded co-educational primary and comprehensive secondary day school, located at 4 Park Road in the town of Jindabyne in the Snowy Mountains region of New South Wales, Australia.

Established as Jindabyne Primary School until 2006, the school enrolled approximately 880 students in 2018, from Kindergarten to Year 12, of whom two percent identified as Indigenous Australians and nine percent were from a language background other than English. The school is operated by the NSW Department of Education; the primary principal is Steve McAlister and the relieving secondary principal is Michael Kowalewski The school's intake includes students from Jindabyne and the surrounding towns/villages of Berridale, Dalgety, Thredbo and Perisher Valley.

== Overview ==
The student leadership team consists of members of Year 12. Two members of each year group participate in the Student Representative Council (SRC).

Jindabyne Central School has a separate primary and secondary school uniform for both males and females.

== Notable alumni ==
- Tim Draxl – Australian actor
- Manuela Berchtold – freestyle skier; represented Australia at the Winter Olympics

== See also ==
- List of government schools in New South Wales
- Education in Australia
