= June Ross =

Australian geologist, palaeontologist and biologist

June Rosa Pitt Ross (2 May 1931 – 10 March 2012) was an Australian geologist, palaeontologist and biologist. She was amongst the first women to obtain a PhD in Australia, and one of the few women of the time to build a successful career in academia.

== Early life and education ==
June Rosa Pitt Phillips was born in Taree, NSW and attended Gosford High School where she was a competitive swimmer and school captain. At the encouragement of the school headmistress, she applied for and received a four-year scholarship to the University of Sydney, where she took a BSc with geology as a fourth subject in first year. After passing her third year exams with distinction, Ross undertook Honours work around Queanbeyan, NSW. At the time she did not have a car, instead renting rooms at farms and exploring the surrounding area on foot. She graduated in 1952 with first class Honours and the Deas-Thomson Scholarship for geology and worked as a demonstrator after graduation. Her PhD fieldwork was spread across NSW, once again completed without a car by travelling on passenger and goods trains and renting rooms at farms. She completed her thesis in four years and immediately went overseas. It took the university two years to make contact with her to inform her that she had completed all the requirements for her PhD, making her one of first women in Australia to obtain the degree.

== Career ==
On completion of her thesis, Ross was awarded two postdoctoral scholarships: an 1851 Research Fellowship to study at University of Cambridge, and an American Association of University Women Scholarship to study in the United States. She chose the latter, and in 1959 with financial support from the Department of Geology at the University of Sydney she left Australia to study at Yale University. At Yale she worked in the Peabody Museum of Natural History with a focus on palaeontology, expanding on some of the work done by Joan Crockford-Beattie on bryozoa. Yale gave her a fellowship for her second year of study, and after that she received a US National Science Foundation Grant which included a half-time stipend. Whilst at Yale she attended graduate lectures given by Australian Sam Warren Carey which inspired her to stay and build a career in the United States.

Ross became a full professor at Western Washington University in 1970. She was unable to gain a position in the geology department with her husband, Charles Ross, instead taking up a position in the biology department. Her research focused on bryozoans and she published over 160 journal articles over her career. Copies of some of her field notebooks have been digitised by the Biodiversity Heritage Library. At the university, she served as Chair of the Biology Department for several years and on the Faculty Senate for several years, spending one term as the president of the Senate. She was also a council member and then President of the International Association of Bryozoologists, and a council member and treasurer of the Paleontological Society for six years. Ross retired in 2004 as professor emeritus.

Outside the university, Ross was instrumental in establishing the local Family Planning Council and its successor, Planned Parenthood, of Whatcom County. She served as the first director of the Planned Parenthood clinic which was in the former St Luke's Hospital.

== Awards ==
Based on her accumulated publications, Ross was awarded a DSc in 1974.

== Legacy ==
The Charles A. & June R.P. Ross Research Fund was established by the Geological Society of America to support student research.
