= Peak Hill Central School =

School in New South Wales, Australia

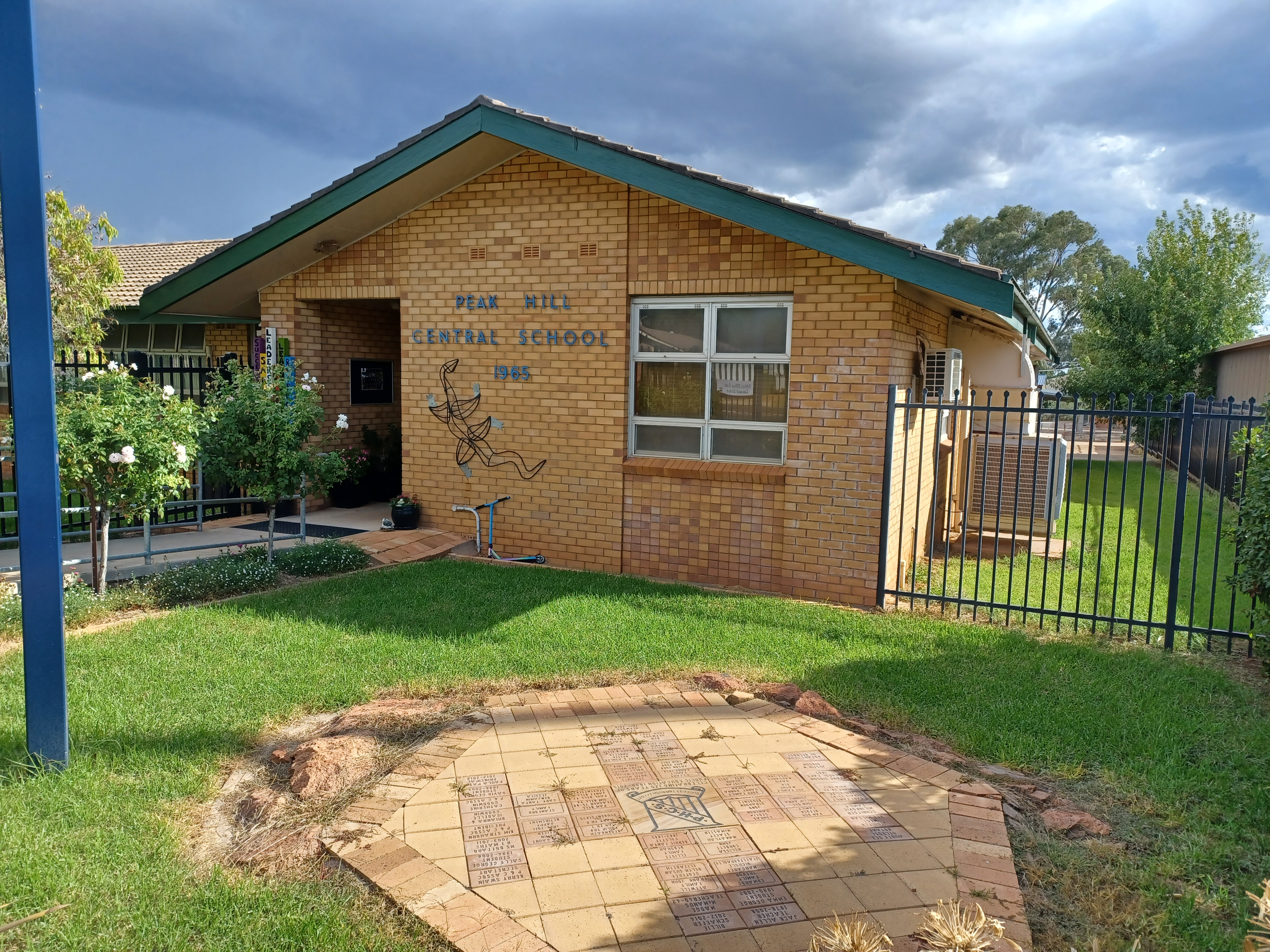
- Peak Hill Central School

Location
- 132–146 Caswell Street Peak Hill, New South Wales; Australia
- Coordinates: 32°43′42″S 148°11′32″E

Information
- School type: Kindergarten and Primary school and Secondary School
- Motto: Success Through Effort
- Established: 1890; 135 years ago (Peak Hill Public School); 1965; 60 years ago (Peak Hill Central School)
- Educational authority: NSW Department of Education
- Principal: Paula Payne
- Years: K–12
- Enrolment: c. 145
- Campus: Regional
- Website: Official Website

Peak Hill Central School (abbreviated as PHCS) is a public school located in Peak Hill in the Central West region of New South Wales, Australia. The School has enrolled approximately 145 students from Kindergarten to Year 12 and the school is operated by the NSW Department of Education

== History ==
Established on 17 February 1890, the school initially operated in a temporary facility, an old store situated on Caswell Street. With an initial enrollment of 42 students on its opening day, the school saw rapid growth throughout the year, reaching approximately 250 students by the year's end.

In 1890, the school acquired a land area of one and a quarter acres through a government grant. On this site, a building constructed of cypress pine was erected to accommodate the growing student population. Unfortunately, detailed information about this building is scarce. However, available annual reports indicate that a total of £1138 was invested in constructing the building and a teacher's residence during the first two years of the school's establishment. As attendance continued to rise, additional facilities had to be provided to meet the growing demands.

The inaugural headmaster of Peak Hill Public School was Mr. Albert G. Mitchell, who served from its opening until 1901. He was succeeded by Mr. James Ray, who held the position until 1905. Subsequently, Mr. Joseph Whiting took charge until 1912, after which Mr. Buttsworth assumed the role of headmaster.

In 1910, the original section of the school building, which had been erected in 1891, was demolished. It was replaced by a new brick building at an estimated cost of £900. Further expansion of the school site took place in 1914 to accommodate the growing needs of the school community.The current Peak Hill Central School building opened in 1965.

== Principals ==
The following individuals have served as School Headmasters or Principals

Ordinal	Officeholders	Term start !
1	Albert Mitchell	Feb 1890
2	James Ray	Feb 1901
3	J Whitting	Mar 1905
4	Herbert Buttsworth	Jun 1912
5	William A Dransfield	Sept 1915
6	J Stack	Jan 1916
7	Thomas E Jones	Jan 1918
8	S C Small	Jan 1925
9	Arthur Cary	Sept 1926
10	Edward Mooney	May 1929
11	James Brown	Jun 1930
12	Samuel Turner	Aug 1930
13	Eric Morton	Jul 1934
14	Reginald Jeffery	Nov 1938
15	John J O'Connor	Dec 1941
16	Robert McKevett	Dec 1944
17	William Elder	Feb 1948
18	Donald Craig	Feb 1952
19	Albert E Rundle	Feb 1955
20	Ronald Hetherington	Feb 1960
21	Robert Nicholls	May 1967
22	David Lewis	Feb 1970
23	Malcolm Clune	
24	Basil Browne	Feb 1976
25	Iain D McPherson	Feb 1986

== See also ==
- List of government schools in New South Wales
- Education in Australia
