= Daria Nina Love =

Veterinary microbiologist and educator

Daria Nina Love (née Hair, 4 September 1946 – 9 June 2001) was an Australian veterinary microbiologist and educator. She was the first woman to be awarded the University of Sydney Medal for Veterinary Science (January 1969) and the first woman in the Faculty of Veterinary Science to be awarded a PhD (1973), for her thesis entitled ‘Studies on virus host-cell relationships of a feline calicivirus’. She was also the first woman to become an associate professor in the Faculty of Veterinary Science, although her bids to become a full professor were unsuccessful. In 1988, she became the first woman in Australia to be awarded a Doctor of Veterinary Science on the basis of her work on the “Biological Properties of some Microorganisms of Veterinary Importance”. Love was renowned for the advances made through her research in the areas of soft tissue infections, oral cavity disease and feline and equine respiratory infections. She received a Rural Industries Research and Development Corporation (RIRDC) award for her outstanding contributions to equine research and the Australian Horse Industry in 2001.

== Early life and education ==
Daria Nina Hair was born on 4 September 1946 to Nina and Jim Hair. Her early life was unsettled as the family moved around Queensland and New South Wales, but she graduated in 1963 as Dux of Gosford High School on the New South Wales Central Coast, and was accepted to study Veterinary Science at the University of Sydney.

She graduated in 1969 (23 January) with first class honours and the University Medal – the first woman in the Faculty of Veterinary Science to do so.

== Professional life ==
Following graduation, Daria and Robert Love established a veterinary practice at Condobolin, New South Wales. In 1970, she commenced PhD work at the University of Sydney, studying host-cell relationships of Feline Calicivirus under Margaret Sabine, with whom she had a lifelong friendship and highly productive scientific collaboration.[history of the vet faculty, yet to go live] She was awarded her PhD in 1973 and then took up an appointment as a research scientist for the Imperial Cancer Research Fund at Lincoln's Inn Fields, London. Her two years of research there produced three publications. She then returned to the University of Sydney as lecturer in Veterinary Microbiology, with principal responsibilities in bacteriology and protozoology.

She conducted bacteriological investigations of commonly occurring diseases in domestic animals. Among her achievements were:

- Instrumental in determining the aetiology and pathogenesis of Proliferative Haemorrhagic Enteropathy in pigs
- Advances in research in soft tissue infections in small animals and horses, especially the role of anaerobic organisms
- Studies of mycobacterial diseases
- Studies of the pharmacokinetics of antibiotics in horses
- Research into equine respiratory disease

At the same time, she maintained her interest in feline viruses. She was also involved in the detection of Equine Herpes Virus 1 (EHV-1) from an aborted foetus of a horse imported into Australia from New Zealand in 1977. This led to her interest in equine viral abortion.

In 1978, she was promoted to a senior lectureship and in 1981 she became the first female associate professor in the Faculty of Veterinary Science at the University of Sydney. She became a member of the Royal College of Pathologists that year, and this was upgraded to a fellowship in 1991.

Love's research associated with EHV1 and EHV4 involved using virological and molecular biological techniques to understand the epidemiology and control of herpes virus infection. Her research led to the development of a trial vaccine. It was for this, and for related achievements in the studies of strangles, travel sickness and the general treatment of bacterial diseases in horses that she was presented with a Rural Industries Research and Development Award for outstanding contributions to equine research and the Australian Horse Industry in 2001, shortly before her death.

Love's other achievements include:

- considerable contribution to the understanding of the taxonomy and pathogenicity of anaerobic bacteria associated with soft tissue infections, particularly oral cavity disease in cats, dogs, and horses
- the description of several new species in the genera of Bacteroides, Eubacterium, Filifactor and Porphyromonas.

From 1988, Love was a member of the Subcommittee on Anaerobic Gram Negative Rods of the International Committee on Systematic Bacteriology, and in 1994 she was invited to be a member of the editorial boards of Veterinary Microbiology and Clinical Infectious Diseases. She was committed to postgraduate training in microbiological research. During her career, she supervised 30 research students. During her career, she held numerous positions including Acting Head of Department, Pro-Dean and Acting Dean. She was an Academic Board member and had input into shaping Chairs including Infectious Diseases, Microbiology and Molecular Biology. She applied for a Chair of her own in 1995, but was rejected. It is recognised within the Faculty of Veterinary Science and the University of Sydney community generally that she should have been the Faculty's first female professor.

== Voluntary work ==
Love was passionate about the welfare of animals and had a particular love of cats. She was heavily involved with the Cat Protection Society of New South Wales, including stints as Treasurer and President.

== Illness and death ==
Love suffered throughout her life from severe autoimmune disease, and in the last few years of her life was unable to continue her research. At this time, she took up a support role for with the New South Wales police. She committed suicide on 9 June 2001.
