= Kanahooka =

- Suburb
- Coordinates: 34°29.5′S 150°48.5′E
- Country: Australia
- State: New South Wales
- Region: Illawarra
- City: Wollongong
- LGA: City of Wollongong
- Location: 95 km (59 mi) SSW of Sydney; 13 km (8.1 mi) SW of Wollongong; 27 km (17 mi) N of Kiama

Government
  - State electorate: Shellharbour, Wollongong
  - Federal division: Whitlam
- Elevation: 4 m (13 ft)

Population
  - Total: 5,698 (2021 census)
- Postcode: 2530
- County: Camden
- Parish: Calderwood
Suburbs around Kanahooka
Brownsville	Berkeley	Berkeley
Dapto	Kanahooka	Lake Illawarra
Dapto	Koonawarra	Lake Illawarra

Kanahooka is a southern suburb in Wollongong City Council. It has a few shops and a playground. Situated on Lake Illawarra is a Park with a playground. It has a public school (Hayes Park Public School) and a high school (Kanahooka High School).

== Smelting ==
The establishment of the Dapto Smelting Works was an important part of Kanahooka's history. The Dapto Smelting Works came about through the ill-fated "Lake Illawarra Harbour Scheme". This scheme gave a great impetus to the growth of the town of Dapto in the early 1900s.

In 1890 a parliamentary act was passed authorising the Illawarra Harbour and Land Corporation to begin projects near Dapto that would involve an outlay of many hundreds of thousands of pounds. The scheme involved building a channel through Lake Illawarra to allow oceangoing vessels to come up to Elizabeth Point, a short distance north of Kanahooka Point. A railway was also built at a cost of 42,000 pounds to allow coal to be brought from a local colliery to be loaded onto the ships.

With the opening of the railway the Smelting Company of Australia Ltd. had been formed and with the backing of overseas capital a large smelting works was established. "The site chosen for the works was an elevated one, contiguous to Mullet Creek and about half a mile from its mouth. The more northerly of "the Twins" - two similar hills - was decapitated, thus providing a series of levels to which the ores would gravitate, in the various processes from bins to crushing and roasting plants, then to the blast furnaces before being sent to the refinery." (O'Malley, 1950, p. 6)

The works were operating at full production by 1899 and were prosperous for several years. They treated lead, silver, zinc, copper and gold from Broken Hill, Zeehan, Mount Morgan and Western Australia.

"The main plant of the smelting works consisted of three blast furnaces, roasting plant, refinery, sulphuric acid plant, steam engines, blowing engines, pumps and a foundry…The products from the works were Dore bullion (gold and silver conglomerate), soft lead and a high-grade copper matte containing gold silver and lead." (O'Malley, 1950, p. 8)

Numbers of employees at the plant peaked at between four and five hundred. Half of the employee population lived in tents and there was a group of fifty in the clump of swamp oaks just north of the works. The success of the smelting works lead to Dapto being a boom town in the early 1900s. The report of the Commissioner for Railways for 1903 declared Dapto the most valuable station on the Illawarra line, its goods transfer totalling 22,000 pounds.

Quite suddenly in 1905 everything folded, competition cut off the supply of ore from Western Australia and Broken Hill, an ambitious scheme for treating nickel from New Caledonia came to nothing and in 1905 the works closed. (McDonald, 1976; O'Malley, 1950)

The Lake Illawarra Authority has published two more books about the Lake in 2012 which focus on the suburb of Brownsville, its history and the role of John Brown in saving the islands known as Gooseberry and Hooka which lie not far from Kanahooka Point—though over towards Berkeley. The first book, "John Brown of Brownsville: his manuscripts, letterbook and the records of Dapto Show Society 1857-1904" edited by Joseph Davis, deals with the man who did most to protect the vegetation of the Lake Islands. The second of these books, titled "Gooseberry & Hooka: the island reserves of Lake Illawarra 1829-1947" edited by Joseph Davis, records by John Brown and others", deals with the history of these two islands and how they have survived to become nature refuges rather than recreation reserves. Davis also did an earlier lavishly illustrated book for The Lake Illawarra Authority entitled "Lake Illawarra: an ongoing history (Davis, Joseph, 1956- vi, 175 p. : ill. maps, ports., facsims) in 2005.

== See also ==
- Kanahooka High School
