= Tatham, New South Wales =

Coordinates: 28°56′S 153°10′E

Tatham is a locality in New South Wales, Australia in Richmond Valley Shire. The name Tatham is derived from Bundjalung Jadham, meaning "child".

Tatham was once a bustling village with a wharf, pub, butcher's shop, post office and a number of schools. The post office building still stands today as does an historic Roman Catholic church.
