= North Shore, New South Wales =

North Shore Port Macquarie, New South Wales
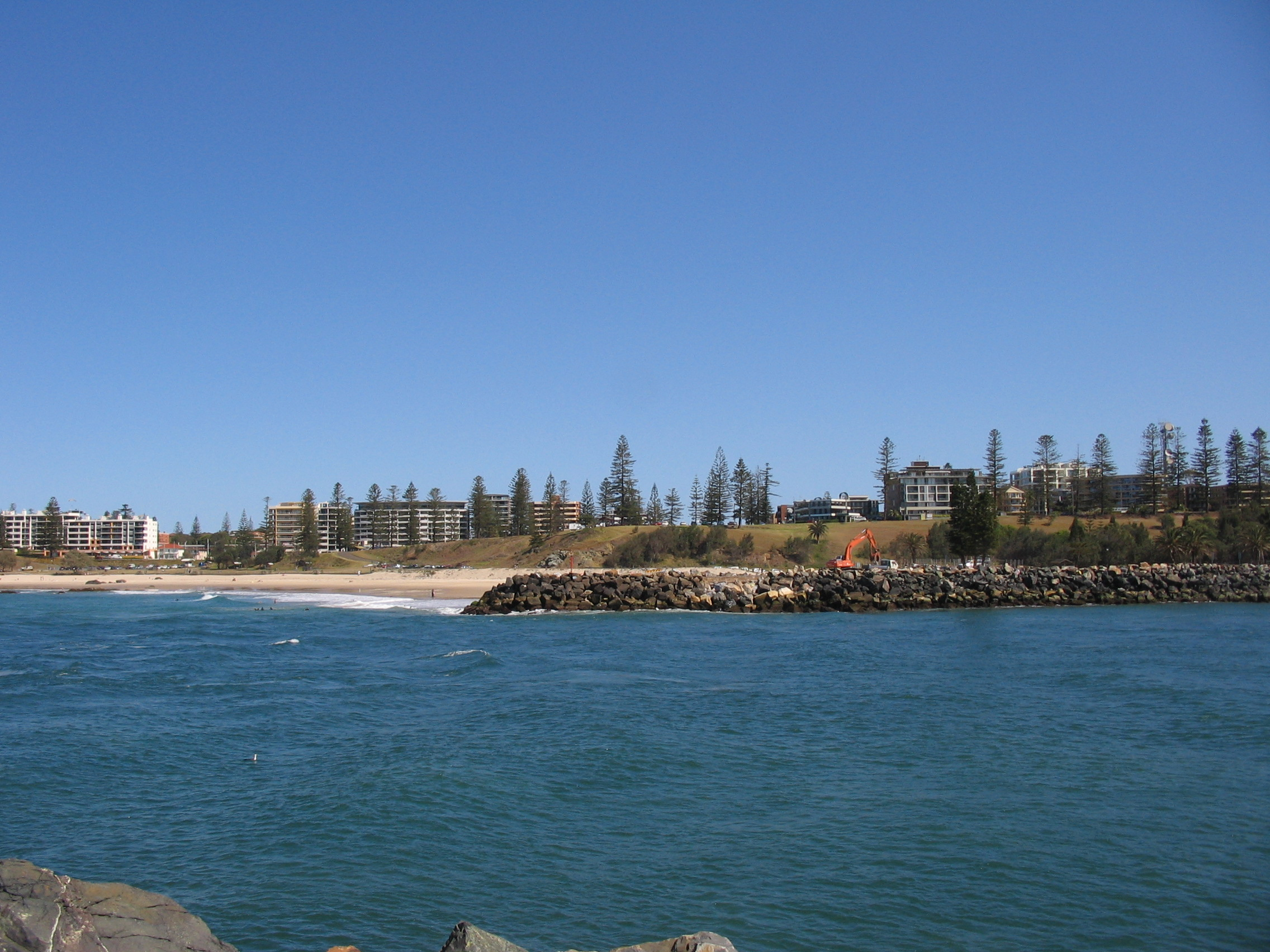
- North Shore Beach in 2009

- Coordinates: 31.408454°S 152.913429°E
- Population: 371 (SAL 2021)
- Postcode(s): 2444
- LGA(s): Port Macquarie-Hastings Council
- State electorate(s): Port Macquarie
- Federal division(s): Cowper

North Shore is a suburb of Port Macquarie, a city in New South Wales. It is located on the north side of the Hastings River.

North Shore is mostly reached by ferry. The Settlement Point Ferry offers scheduled ferry services for cars to cross the 5km of water separating the North Shore from Settlement Point.

North Shore is a coastal and rural suburb.
