= Henry Kendall High School =

Secondary school in Australia

Location
- Faunce Street, Gosford, Central Coast, New South Wales; Australia; 33°25′16″S 151°20′04″E

Information
- Former name: Gosford High School
- Type: Government-funded co-educational comprehensive secondary day school
- Motto: Persevere
- Established: January 1970; 56 years ago
- School district: Central Coast; Regional North
- Educational authority: New South Wales Department of Education
- Principal: Andrew Backhouse
- Staff: ~110
- Teaching staff: 62.8 FTE (2018)
- Years: 7–12
- Enrolment: 787 (2018)
- Campus type: Suburban
- Houses: Araluen, Corumben, Narara, Warrigal
- Colours: Green, navy blue, black, lemon, grey, white
- Slogan: Developing confident, responsible citizens who strive for excellence
- Website: henrykenda-h.schools.nsw.gov.au

Henry Kendall High School is a co-educational comprehensive secondary day school, located in Gosford, in the Central Coast region of New South Wales, Australia.

== History ==
Established in January 1970, on the old Faunce Street site which was then a part of Gosford High School, the school enrolled approximately 790 students in 2018, from Year 7 to Year 12; six percent identified as Indigenous Australians and 21 percent were from a language background other than English. The school is operated by the NSW Department of Education; the principal is Andrew Backhouse.

In 2015, long time staff member, teacher and year advisor Gae Hobson retired after thirty years' of service.

== See also ==
- List of government schools in New South Wales: G–P
- Education in Australia
