= West Kempsey =

West Kempsey Kempsey, New South Wales
- Coordinates: 31.05757°S 152.82794°E
- Population: 5,073 (SAL 2021)
- Postcode(s): 2440
- LGA(s): Kempsey Shire
- State electorate(s): Oxley
- Federal division(s): Cowper

West Kempsey is a suburb of Kempsey in the Kempsey Shire, New South Wales, Australia.
