= Hoxton Park High School =

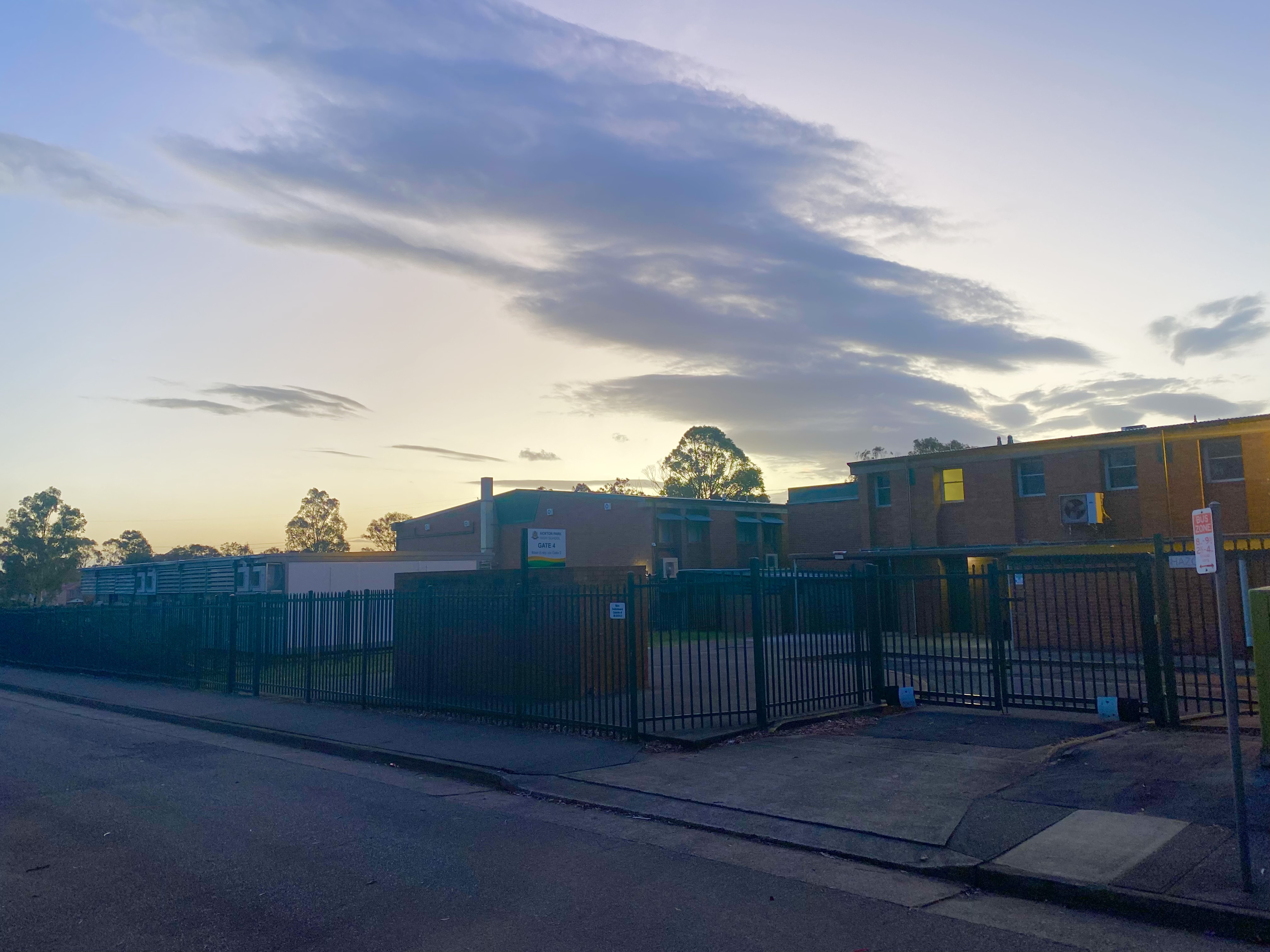

Location
- 40 Wilson Road, Hinchinbrook, South Western Sydney, New South Wales; Australia; 33°55′10″S 150°51′45″E

Information
- Type: Government-funded co-educational comprehensive secondary day school
- Motto: Achieving Excellence, Inspiring Success
- Established: 1974; 52 years ago
- School district: Cowpasture
- Educational authority: New South Wales Department of Education
- Principal: Leny Wallace
- Years: 7–12
- Enrolment: 710
- Houses: Wenden, Laver, Cuthbert and Mckay
- Colours: Green, yellow, and white
- Website: hoxtonpark-h.schools.nsw.gov.au
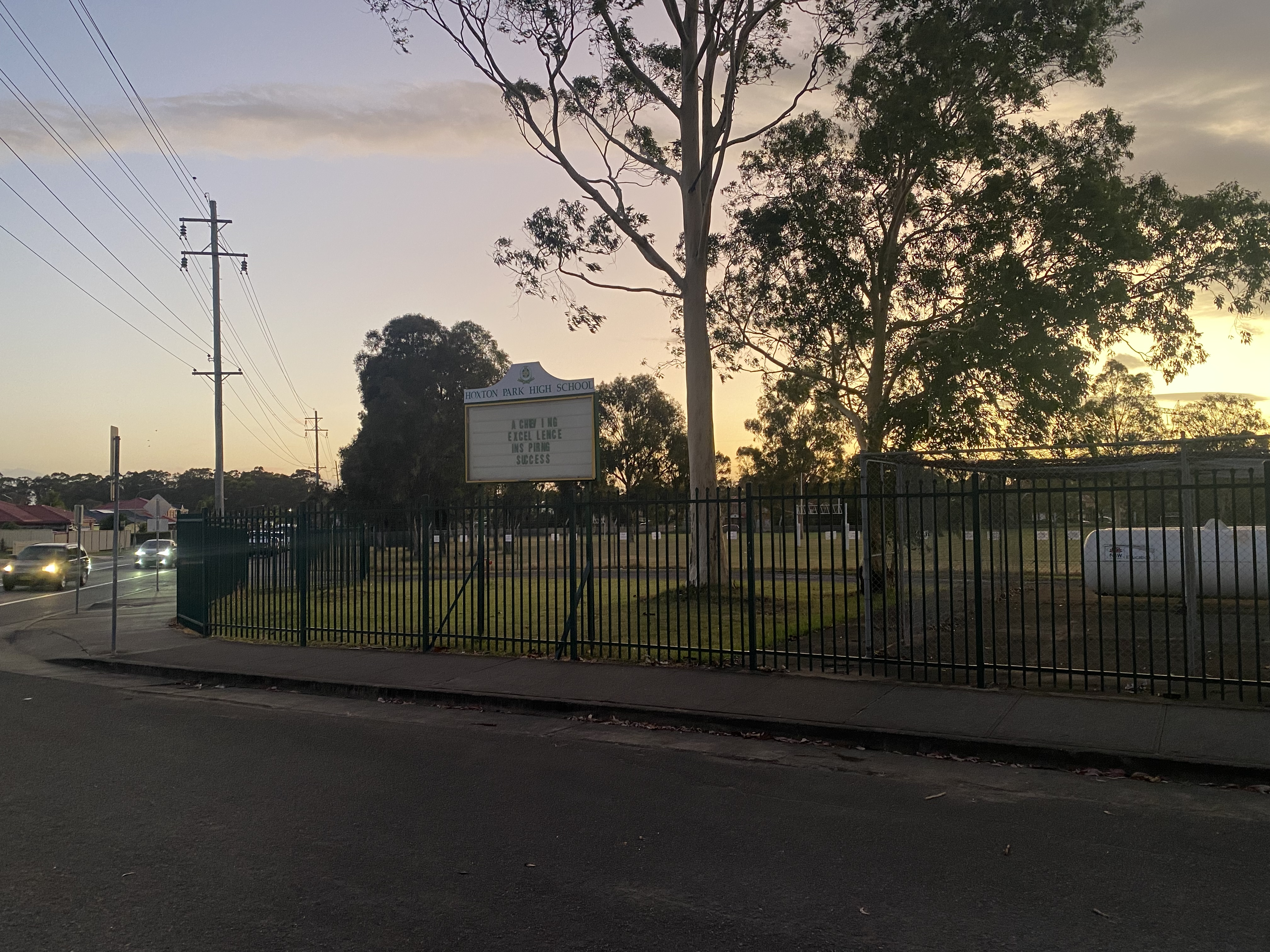

Hoxton Park High School is a government-funded co-educational comprehensive secondary day school, located in Hinchinbrook, a south-western suburb of Sydney, New South Wales, Australia.

Established in 1974 in what was then a rural district, the school now caters for approximately 700 students from Year 7 to Year 12. The school is operated by the New South Wales Department of Education and attracts students from rural areas to the west such as Austral and Kemps Creek. Its feed schools include Hoxton Park Public School, Hinchinbrook Public School and Middleton Grange Public School.

== See also ==
- List of government schools in New South Wales
- Education in Australia
