= Kanahooka High School =

Location
- Kanahooka, Illawarra region, New South Wales; Australia; 34°29′40″S 150°48′16″E

Information
- Type: Government-funded co-educational comprehensive secondary day school
- Motto: Towards a Better World
- Established: 29 January 1974; 52 years ago
- School district: Lake Illawarra North; Regional South
- Educational authority: New South Wales Department of Education
- Principal: Christine Toohey
- Teaching staff: 57 FTE (2018)
- Years: 7–12
- Enrolment: 590 (2018)
- Campus: Suburban
- Colours: Juniors: green and white; Seniors: red and white
- Website: kanahooka-h.schools.nsw.gov.au

Kanahooka High School is a government-funded co-educational comprehensive secondary day school, located in Kanahooka, 15 kilometres (9 mi) southwest of the city of Wollongong, in the Illawarra region of New South Wales, Australia.

Established in 1974, the school enrolled for approximately 600 students in 2018, from Year 7 to Year 12, of whom 16 percent identified as Indigenous Australians and eight percent were from a language background other than English. The school is operated by the NSW Department of Education; the principal is Christine Toohey. Students are drawn from a catchment area that covers the southwestern part of the City of Wollongong.

== History ==
The school was named for a point at the western shore of Lake Illawarra, said to mean "burial place of Hooka". Hooka was an Aboriginal chief living in the Berkeley area around the time of European settlement.

The school first opened on 29 January 1974 under principal R.C.H. (Bob) Everitt, with 400 students in years 7 and 8. Due to bad weather and material shortages, demountables at Dapto High School were used until the school was completed. On 18 October 1974 they moved to the new site at Robert and Joan Streets. The school first offered NSW Higher School Certificate (HSC) subjects in 1978. The school's population peaked at 1,164 students in 1983. With changes to demographics and other schools opening in the area, the school population fell to a relatively stable 650 in the late 1990s.

== Academic achievements ==
In 2017 Kanahooka High School ranked number 573 in the HSC with 212 exams sat by 39 students, a success rate of 0.47 percent and one high score.

== See also ==
- List of government schools in New South Wales: G–P
- List of schools in Illawarra and the South East
- Education in Australia
