= Islington Public School =

Coordinates: 32.9117°S 151.7442°E

Information
- School type: Government-funded co-educational Primary
- Motto: Goodness, Truth, Beauty
- Status: Operational
- Principal: Megan Hamilton
- Years offered: K–6
- Enrollment: 180
- Website: https://islington-p.schools.nsw.gov.au

Islington Public School is a government-funded co-educational primary school, located in Islington, in the inner city of Newcastle, New South Wales, Australia. The school was established in 1887 and was the site of an asbestos contamination on 1 March 2022, leading it to become temporarily closed (Note: During this period, students and staff conducted operations on several neighbouring school sites.) until 25 March 2022, when it reopened again. As of 2022, there are 180 students enrolled.

== History ==
In the late 1800s, Islington was developed into a residential suburb. During this time, the area was mainly populated by families of miners and railway workers which, in response, led to the establishment of the school in 1887.

By 1893, the school's enrollment had increased from 200 to 460 as a result from the suburb's increasing population, and in 1941, Islington Public School became one of the first schools in NSW to trial giving students free milk.

== Temporary closure and clean-up effort ==
On 1 March 2022, a massive warehouse fire unfolded in the neighbouring suburb of Wickham. The roofs of the building, which were made of asbestos, collapsed and sent a plume across several suburbs west of the site, including over the school. The school became temporarily non-operational on 2 March 2022, with students and staff temporarily moving to multiple local neighbouring school sites to resume operations as a full internal environmental clean of the entire school was undertaken.

On 18 March 2022, the NSW Department of Education announced all remediation of asbestos containing material had been completed. Students and staff returned to normal operations on 25 March 2022.

== See also ==
- List of government schools in New South Wales
