= Mummulgum =

Mummulgum New South Wales
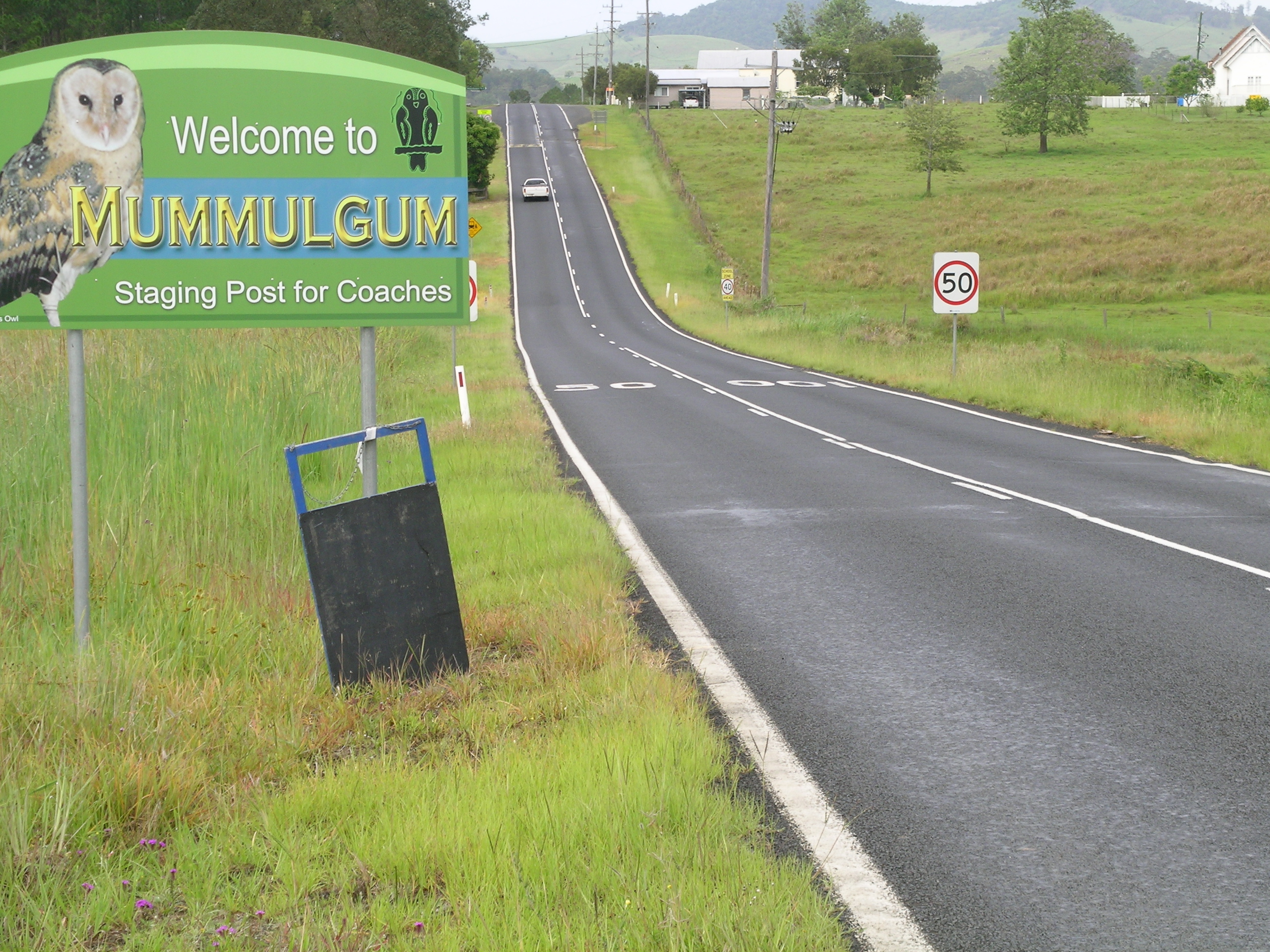
- A Mummulgum entry sign.

- Coordinates: 28°51′00″S 152°48′00″E
- Population: 95 (2016 census)
- Postcode(s): 2470
- Elevation: 115 m (377 ft)
- LGA(s): Kyogle Council
- County: Rous
- Parish: Mummulgum
- State electorate(s): Lismore
- Federal division(s): Page

Mummulgum is a small rural village in the Northern Rivers region of New South Wales, Australia, 740 kilometres from the state capital, Sydney. Mummulgum is located on Shannon Brook between Tenterfield and Casino on the Bruxner Highway (Highway 44). It is 58 km south-west of Kyogle with the village and surrounding area being locally administered by Kyogle Council. The nearest large town is Casino which is 27 kilometres east of Mummulgum.

== Population ==
According to the 2016 Census, there were 95 people living in Mummulgum and the surrounding area. The main form of employment was in agricultural production. On 29 September 2001, Mummulgum Public School celebrated its centenary.

== Famous residents ==
Ajay Rochester grew up in Mummulgum, attending Mummulgum Public School – a one teacher school. She grew up on a farm in Simpkins Creek and wrote about her farm life in her bestselling book "Confessions of a Reformed Dieter".
