= List of government schools in New South Wales (B) =

Prior to 1848, most schools in New South Wales were operated by churches or private organisations, with some financial support from the government under the Denominational School Board, which was established in 1836. In January 1848, the Board of National Education began establishing government schools to develop a public education system, with the enactment and royal assent (16 August 1848) of the National Education Board Act 1848 (NSW). The first public school, Kempsey National School, opened that year, and by 1851, more than 37 public schools were in operation in New South Wales. As of 2025, the New South Wales Department of Education, a department of the Government of New South Wales, administers more than 2,200 public schools, both primary and secondary schools, across that state, that are in these lists:

== B ==
| Name | Suburb/Town | Region | Opened | Coordinates | Ref |
|---|---|---|---|---|---|
| Balarang Public School | Oak Flats | Illawarra | 1968 | 34°33′33.22″S 150°49′50.69″E | |
| Bald Blair Public School | Guyra | Northern Tablelands | 1920 | 30°13′48.94″S 151°47′3.01″E | |
| Bald Face Public School | Blakehurst | St George | 1949 | 33°59′48.06″S 151°6′24.7″E | |
| Balgowlah Heights Public School | Balgowlah | Northern Beaches | 1933 | 33°48′20.99″S 151°15′32.47″E | |
| Balgowlah North Public School | Balgowlah North | Northern Beaches | 1955 | 33°46′58.12″S 151°14′47.45″E | |
| Balgownie Public School | Balgownie | Illawarra | 1889 | 34°23′16.07″S 150°52′18.4″E | |
| Ballimore Public School | Ballimore | Orana | 1884 | 32°11′37.09″S 148°54′0.67″E | |
| Ballina Coast High School | Ballina | Northern Rivers | 1956 | 28°52′0.91″S 153°33′54.23″E | |
| Ballina Public School | Ballina | Northern Rivers | 1863 | 28°52′10.3″S 153°33′52.03″E | |
| Balmain Public School | Balmain | Northern Rivers | 1860 | 33°51′32.16″S 151°11′2.32″E | |
| Balranald Central School | Balranald | Riverina | 1865 | 34°38′9.29″S 143°33′46.91″E | |
| Bangalow Public School | Bangalow | Northern Rivers | 1884 | 28°41′7.71″S 153°31′34.4″E | |
| Bangor Public School | Bangor | Southern Sydney | 1984 | 34°1′9.41″S 151°1′47.83″E | |
| Banks Public School | St Clair | Western Sydney | 1986 | 33°47′36.63″S 150°46′22.04″E | |
| Banksia Road Public School | Greenacre | Western Sydney | 1959 | 33°54′20.66″S 151°3′4.45″E | |
| Banksmeadow Public School | Botany | South Eastern Sydney | 1881 | 33°54′20.66″S 151°3′4.45″E | |
| Bankstown Girls High School | Bankstown | South Western Sydney | 1959 | 33°55′13.69″S 151°1′56.99″E | |
| Bankstown Hospital School | Bankstown | South Western Sydney | 1966 | 33°55′58.55″S 151°1′13.7″E | |
| Bankstown North Public School | Bankstown | South Western Sydney | 1868 | 33°54′17.78″S 151°2′19.18″E | |
| Bankstown Public School | Bankstown | South Western Sydney | 1915 | 33°55′14.15″S 151°2′0.53″E | |
| Bankstown Senior College | Bankstown | South Western Sydney | 1992 | 33°55′49.11″S 151°1′18.06″E | |
| Bankstown South Infants School | Bankstown | South Western Sydney | 1950 | 33°55′52.24″S 151°2′22″E | |
| Bankstown West Public School | Bankstown | South Western Sydney | 1931 | 33°54′56.78″S 151°1′10.33″E | |
| Banora Point High School | Banora Point | Northern Rivers | 2004 | 28°12′55.9″S 153°31′29.47″E | |
| Banora Point Public School | Banora Point | Northern Rivers | 1893 | 28°13′19.94″S 153°32′39.13″E | |
| Baradine Central School | Baradine | Orana | 1865 | 30°57′0.7″S 149°4′11.97″E | |
| Bardia Public School | Bardwell Park | Southern Sydney | 2015 | 33°58′30.88″S 150°51′30.14″E | |
| Bardwell Park Infants School | Bardwell Park | Southern Sydney | 1943 | 33°55′59.8″S 151°7′32.99″E | |
| Barellan Central School | Barellan | Riverina | 1911 | 34°17′15.03″S 146°34′18.1″E | |
| Bargo Public School | Bargo | Macarthur | 1869 | 34°17′34.97″S 150°35′0.63″E | |
| Barham High School | Barham | Riverina | 1958 | 35°37′25.25″S 144°7′49.79″E | |
| Barham Public School | Barham | Riverina | 1901 | 35°37′37.21″S 144°7′44.32″E | |
| Barkers Vale Public School | Wadeville | Northern Rivers | 1933 | 28°32′57.07″S 153°8′59.33″E | |
| Barmedman Public School | Barmedman | Riverina | 1992 | 34°8′50.54″S 147°23′9.27″E | |
| Barnier Public School | Quakers Hill | Greater West | 1992 | 33°43′12.32″S 150°54′8.78″E | |
| Barnsley Public School | Barnsley | Hunter | 1865 | 32°55′55.94″S 151°35′41.59″E | |
| Barooga Public School | Barooga | Riverina | 1896 | 35°54′46.01″S 145°41′44.98″E | |
| Barraba Central School | Barraba | New England | 1861 | 30°22′55.45″S 150°36′21.8″E | |
| Barrack Heights Public School | Barrack Heights | Illawarra | 1976 | 34°33′32.52″S 150°50′48.12″E | |
| Barrenjoey High School | Avalon Beach | Northern Beaches | 1968 | 33°37′51.09″S 151°20′0.63″E | |
| Barrington Public School | Barrington | Mid North Coast | 1864 | 31°58′16.21″S 151°54′43.18″E | |
| Barwon Learning Centre | Moree | New England | 2009 | 29°28′53.18″S 149°50′29.79″E | |
| Baryulgil Public School | Baryulgil | Northern Rivers | 1917 | 29°13′24.11″S 152°36′23.26″E | |
| Bass High School | Bass Hill | South Western Sydney | 1959 | 33°53′52.29″S 150°59′30.79″E | |
| Bass Hill Public School | Bass Hill | South Western Sydney | 1923 | 33°54′19.07″S 151°0′25.33″E | |
| Bateau Bay Public School | Bateau Bay | Central Coast | 1980 | 33°23′27.55″S 151°28′34.43″E | |
| Batemans Bay High School | Batehaven | South Coast | 1986 | 35°43′42.61″S 150°11′41.76″E | |
| Batemans Bay Public School | Surfside | South Coast | 1869 | 35°41′59.45″S 150°11′21.62″E | |
| Bates Drive School | Kareela | Southern Sydney | 1954 | 34°1′19.43″S 151°5′9.09″E | |
| Bathurst Public School | Bathurst | Central West | 1853 | 33°25′15.31″S 149°34′14.51″E | |
| Bathurst South Public School | Bathurst | Central West | 1879 | 33°25′59.28″S 149°34′11.52″E | |
| Bathurst West Public School | Bathurst | Central West | 1954 | 33°24′40.69″S 149°33′33.37″E | |
| Batlow Technology School | Batlow | Riverina | 1868 | 35°31′19.85″S 148°8′50.99″E | |
| Baulkham Hills High School | Baulkham Hills | Hills District | 1971 | 33°45′6.62″S 150°59′27.26″E | |
| Baulkham Hills North Public School | Baulkham Hills | Hills District | 1868 | 33°45′6.73″S 150°59′58.54″E | |
| Beacon Hill Public School | Beacon Hill | Northern Beaches | 1955 | 33°45′4.67″S 151°15′36.58″E | |
| Beaumont Hills Public School | Beaumont Hills | Hills District | 2001 | 33°41′51.8″S 150°56′43.27″E | |
| Beaumont Road Public School | Killara | Northern Sydney | 1953 | 33°46′29.77″S 151°8′45.47″E | |
| Beauty Point Public School | Mosman | Northern Sydney | 1951 | 33°48′45.12″S 151°14′33.58″E | |
| Bedgerebong Public School | Bedgerebong | Central West | 1876 | 33°21′41.5″S 147°40′43.08″E | |
| Beechwood Public School | Wauchope | North Coast | 1869 | 31°26′9.89″S 152°40′50.62″E | |
| Beecroft Public School | Beecroft | Northern Sydney | 1897 | 33°45′7.86″S 151°3′54.67″E | |
| Beelbangera Public School | Beelbangera | South Western Sydney | 1922 | 34°15′10.03″S 146°6′5.45″E | |
| Bega High School | Bega | South Coast | 1952 | 36°40′35.83″S 149°50′20.65″E | |
| Bega Valley Public School | Bega | South Coast | 1860 | 36°40′35.83″S 149°50′20.65″E | |
| Belair Public School | Adamstown Heights | Hunter | 1968 | 32°56′44.11″S 151°42′45.97″E | |
| Bellambi Public School | Bellambi | Illawarra | 1956 | 34°22′16.43″S 150°54′47.07″E | |
| Bellata Public School | Bellata | North West Slopes | 1899 | 29°55′8.98″S 149°47′43.71″E | |
| Bellbird Public School | Bellbird | Hunter | 1913 | 32°51′33.86″S 151°18′58.3″E | |
| Bellbrook Public School | Bellbrook | Mid North Coast | 1883 | 30°49′9.49″S 152°30′32.22″E | |
| Bellevue Hill Public School | Bellevue Hill | Eastern Sydney | 1925 | 33°53′13.28″S 151°15′33.86″E | |
| Bellingen High School | Bellingen | Mid North Coast | 1957 | 30°27′17.67″S 152°54′26.29″E | |
| Bellingen Public School | Bellingen | Mid North Coast | 1870 | 30°27′10.91″S 152°53′35.21″E | |
| Belltrees Public School | Scone | Hunter | 1876 | 31°59′21″S 151°7′47.22″E | |
| Belmont High School | Belmont | Lake Macquarie | 1953 | 33°1′39.07″S 151°39′35.97″E | |
| Belmont North Public School | Belmont | Lake Macquarie | 1953 | 33°1′11.88″S 151°40′15.58″E | |
| Belmont Public School | Belmont | Lake Macquarie | 1874 | 33°1′48.68″S 151°39′44.74″E | |
| Belmore Boys High School | Belmore | South Western Sydney | 1928 | 33°54′40.08″S 151°5′5.58″E | |
| Belmore North Public School | Belmore | South Western Sydney | 1903 | 33°54′35.37″S 151°5′4.69″E | |
| Belmore South Public School | Belmore | South Western Sydney | 1862 | 33°55′27.85″S 151°5′28.93″E | |
| Belrose Public School | Belrose | Northern Beaches | 1952 | 33°43′39.43″S 151°12′55.46″E | |
| Bemboka Public School | Bemboka | South Coast | 1871 | 36°37′51.85″S 149°34′19.08″E | |
| Ben Lomond Public School | Ben Lomond | Northern Tablelands | 1885 | 30°1′1.08″S 151°39′40.88″E | |
| Ben Venue Public School | Armidale | Northern Tablelands | 1900 | 30°30′10.48″S 151°40′29.31″E | |
| Bendemeer Public School | Bendemeer | New England | 1860 | 30°53′11.69″S 151°9′3.9″E | |
| Bennett Road Public School | Colyton | Greater West | 1961 | 33°47′0.5″S 150°47′34.48″E | |
| Berala Public School | Berala | South Western Sydney | 1924 | 33°52′11.62″S 151°1′39.98″E | |
| Beresfield Public School | Beresfield | Hunter | 1883 | 32°48′13.87″S 151°39′13.38″E | |
| Beresford Road Public School | Greystanes | Greater West | 1969 | 33°48′53.48″S 150°56′34.24″E | |
| Berinba Public School | Yass | Southern Tablelands | 1972 | 34°50′54.74″S 148°55′11.22″E | |
| Berkeley Public School | Berkeley | Illawarra | 1858 | 34°28′45.97″S 150°51′21.21″E | |
| Berkeley Vale Public School | Berkeley Vale | Central Coast | 1912 | 33°21′0.88″S 151°26′8.12″E | |
| Berkeley West Public School | Berkeley | Illawarra | 1959 | 34°28′32.6″S 150°50′26.81″E | |
| Bermagui Public School | Bermagui | South Coast | 1876 | 36°25′14.96″S 150°3′50.15″E | |
| Berowra Public School | Berowra | Northern Sydney | 1894 | 33°37′6.74″S 151°8′51.75″E | |
| Berridale Public School | Berridale | Snowy Mountains | 1883 | 36°22′16.76″S 148°49′40.9″E | |
| Berrigan Public School | Berrigan | Riverina | 1891 | 35°39′31.85″S 145°48′55.49″E | |
| Berrima Public School | Berrima | Southern Highlands | 1869 | 34°29′10.92″S 150°20′26.35″E | |
| Berry Public School | Berry | South Coast | 1860 | 34°46′39.83″S 150°41′25.38″E | |
| Bert Oldfield Public School | Seven Hills | Greater West | 1959 | 33°46′39.13″S 150°55′28.66″E | |
| Beverley Park School | Campbelltown | South Western Sydney | 1941 | 34°3′43.42″S 150°49′25.87″E | |
| Beverly Hills Girls High School | Beverly Hills | Southern Sydney | 1960 | 33°56′54.86″S 151°4′42.64″E | |
| Beverly Hills North Public School | Beverly Hills | St George | 1928 | 33°56′27.93″S 151°4′28.32″E | |
| Beverly Hills Public School | Beverly Hills | Southern Sydney | 1893 | 33°57′12.88″S 151°5′4.94″E | |
| Bexhill Public School | Bexhill | Northern Rivers | 1882 | 28°45′58.58″S 153°20′46.07″E | |
| Bexley North Public School | Bexley | St George | 1924 | 33°56′28.33″S 151°7′11.5″E | |
| Bexley Public School | Bexley | St George | 1887 | 33°56′51.4″S 151°7′41.54″E | |
| Biddabah Public School | Warners Bay | Hunter | 1859 | 32°57′58.71″S 151°38′33.13″E | |
| Bidwill Public School | Bidwill | Greater West | 1977 | 33°44′0.68″S 150°49′34.9″E | |
| Bigga Public School | Bigga | Southern Tablelands | 1884 | 34°5′6.64″S 149°8′40.32″E | |
| Bilambil Public School | Bilambil | Far North Coast | 1898 | 28°13′23.23″S 153°28′5.08″E | |
| Bilgola Plateau Public School | Bilgola Plateau | Northern Beaches | 1965 | 33°38′38.41″S 151°18′48.2″E | |
| Billabong High School | Culcairn | Riverina | 1978 | 35°39′43.69″S 147°2′37.4″E | |
| Bilpin Public School | Bilpin | Hawkesbury | 1909 | 33°29′50.5″S 150°30′58.87″E | |
| Binalong Public School | Binalong | Southern Tablelands | 1862 | 34°40′12.14″S 148°37′29.98″E | |
| Binda Public School | Binda | Southern Tablelands | 1851 | 34°19′53.11″S 149°22′1.28″E | |
| Bingara Central School | Bingara | New England | 1862 | 29°52′2.45″S 150°34′4″E | |
| Binnaway Central School | Binnaway | Central West | 1878 | 31°33′10.72″S 149°22′33.89″E | |
| Binya Public School | Binya | Riverina | 1919 | 34°13′45.23″S 146°21′8″E | |
| Biraban Public School | Toronto | Hunter | 1956 | 33°0′29.27″S 151°34′32.9″E | |
| Birchgrove Public School | Birchgrove | Inner West | 1885 | 33°51′12.15″S 151°10′38.11″E | |
| Birrong Boys High School | Birrong | South Western Sydney | 1958 | 33°53′37.34″S 151°1′29.18″E | |
| Birrong Girls High School | Birrong | South Western Sydney | 1957 | 33°53′24.2″S 151°1′36.38″E | |
| Birrong Public School | Birrong | South Western Sydney | 1950 | 33°53′43.79″S 151°1′15.68″E | |
| Black Hill Public School | Black Hill | Hunter | 1881 | 32°50′17.33″S 151°37′2.22″E | |
| Black Mountain Public School | Black Mountain | Northern Tablelands | 1882 | 30°18′31.44″S 151°39′28.24″E | |
| Black Springs Public School | Black Springs | Central Tablelands | 1881 | 33°50′46.2″S 149°44′28.27″E | |
| Blackalls Park Public School | Blackalls Park | Hunter | 1953 | 32°59′53.81″S 151°34′39.86″E | |
| Blackett Public School | Blackett | Greater West | 1971 | 33°44′21.78″S 150°48′56.48″E | |
| Blackheath Public School | Blackheath | Blue Mountains | 1885 | 33°38′18.96″S 150°17′8.24″E | |
| Blacksmiths Public School | Blacksmiths | Lake Macquarie | 1962 | 33°4′18.85″S 151°39′12.89″E | |
| Blacktown Boys High School | Blacktown | Western Sydney | 1959 | 33°45′43.79″S 150°54′43.84″E | |
| Blacktown Girls High School | Blacktown | Western Sydney | 1959 | 33°45′41.95″S 150°54′41.48″E | |
| Blacktown North Public School | Blacktown | Western Sydney | 1957 | 33°45′28.74″S 150°54′45.95″E | |
| Blacktown South Public School | Blacktown | Western Sydney | 1959 | 33°46′51.05″S 150°54′23.21″E | |
| Blacktown West Public School | Blacktown | Western Sydney | 1957 | 33°46′13.69″S 150°53′34.1″E | |
| Blackville Public School | Blackville | Western Sydney | 1976 | 31°38′26.02″S 150°14′16.06″E | |
| Blackwell Public School | St Clair | Western Sydney | 1985 | 33°48′22.4″S 150°46′58.46″E | |
| Blairmount Public School | Blairmount | Macarthur | 1878 | 34°2′53.49″S 150°48′8.33″E | |
| Blakebrook Public School | Blakebrook | Northern Rivers | 1868 | 28°45′48.7″S 153°13′48.13″E | |
| Blakehurst High School | Blakehurst | Southern Sydney | 1960 | 33°58′52.08″S 151°6′47.68″E | |
| Blakehurst Public School | Blakehurst | Southern Sydney | 1960 | 33°59′0.44″S 151°6′55.47″E | |
| Blandford Public School | Blandford | Upper Hunter | 1871 | 31°46′44.37″S 150°53′33.7″E | |
| Blaxcell Street Public School | Granville | Western Sydney | 1924 | 33°51′28.79″S 151°0′20.68″E | |
| Blaxland East Public School | East Blaxland | Blue Mountains | 1962 | 33°44′49.03″S 150°37′24.67″E | |
| Blaxland High School | Blaxland | Blue Mountains | 1977 | 33°45′17.67″S 150°36′35.07″E | |
| Blaxland Public School | Blaxland | Blue Mountains | 1926 | 33°44′13.51″S 150°36′15.43″E | |
| Blayney High School | Blayney | Central West | 1970 | 33°31′53.66″S 149°15′4.78″E | |
| Blayney Public School | Blayney | Central West | 1878 | 33°31′44.79″S 149°15′4.54″E | |
| Bletchington Public School | Orange | Central West | 1956 | 33°16′8.93″S 149°6′12.9″E | |
| Bligh Park Public School | Bligh Park | Greater West | 1991 | 33°38′23.77″S 150°47′41.39″E | |
| Blighty Public School | Blighty | Riverina | 1929 | 35°34′49.52″S 145°20′58.99″E | |
| Blue Haven Public School | Blue Haven | Central Coast | 1999 | 33°12′43.78″S 151°30′9.78″E | |
| Boambee Public School | Boambee | Mid North Coast | 1902 | 30°20′3.65″S 153°4′36.55″E | |
| Bobin Public School | Bobin | Mid North Coast | 1883 | 31°42′47.33″S 152°17′1.48″E | |
| Bobs Farm Public School | Bobs Farm | Hunter | 1918 | 32°45′59″S 152°0′39″E | |
| Bodalla Public School | Bodalla | Hunter | 1867 | 36°5′54.86″S 150°3′14.6″E | |
| Bogan Gate Public School | Bogan Gate | Central West | 1898 | 33°6′18.62″S 147°47′53.81″E | |
| Bogangar Public School | Bogangar | Northern Rivers | 2004 | 28°20′17.9″S 153°34′22.01″E | |
| Boggabilla Central School | Boggabilla | New England | 1988 | 28°36′56.92″S 150°21′43.36″E | |
| Boggabri Public School | Boggabri | New England | 1876 | 30°42′19.97″S 150°2′37.72″E | |
| Bolwarra Public School | Bolwarra | Hunter | 1852 | 32°42′25.35″S 151°34′22.87″E | |
| Bomaderry High School | Bomaderry | Shoalhaven | 1968 | 34°50′40.45″S 150°36′9.77″E | |
| Bomaderry Public School | Bomaderry | Shoalhaven | 1867 | 34°50′54.58″S 150°36′28.46″E | |
| Bombala High School | Bombala | Monaro | 1973 | 36°55′2.24″S 149°13′56.47″E | |
| Bombala Public School | Bombala | Monaro | 1863 | 36°55′3.82″S 149°14′0.32″E | |
| Bonalbo Central School | Bonalbo | Northern Rivers | 1911 | 28°44′8.78″S 152°37′29.88″E | |
| Bondi Beach Public School | Bondi Beach | Eastern Sydney | 1923 | 33°53′18.98″S 151°16′37.46″E | |
| Bondi Public School | Bondi Beach | Eastern Sydney | 1883 | 33°53′33.73″S 151°15′52.85″E | |
| Bongongo Public School | Bongongolong | Riverina | 1886 | 35°5′5.41″S 148°23′58.77″E | |
| Bonnells Bay Public School | Bonnells Bay | Lake Macquarie | 1912 | 33°6′49.4″S 151°30′59.26″E | |
| Bonnet Bay Public School | Bonnet Bay | Southern Sydney | 1979 | 34°0′46.53″S 151°3′21.02″E | |
| Bonnyrigg Heights Primary School | Bonnyrigg Heights | Western Sydney | 1993 | 33°53′23.4″S 150°52′3.1″E | |
| Bonnyrigg High School | Bonnyrigg | South Western Sydney | 1961 | 33°53′40.22″S 150°53′32.89″E | |
| Bonnyrigg Public School | Bonnyrigg | South Western Sydney | 1982 | 33°53′18.68″S 150°53′19.77″E | |
| Bonshaw Public School | Bonshaw | New England | 1914 | 29°2′48.16″S 151°16′41.12″E | |
| Bonville Public School | Bonville | Mid North Coast | 1888 | 30°22′47.18″S 153°1′57.08″E | |
| Boolaroo Public School | Boolaroo | Hunter | 1900 | 32°57′4.13″S 151°37′23.39″E | |
| Boomi Public School | Boomi | North West Slopes | 1901 | 28°43′28.96″S 149°34′37.82″E | |
| Booragul Public School | Booragul | Hunter | 1955 | 32°58′25.19″S 151°36′39.57″E | |
| Booral Public School | Booral | Mid North Coast | 1865 | 32°28′18.71″S 151°57′34.83″E | |
| Boorowa Central School | Boorowa | South Western Slopes | 1870 | 34°26′16.6″S 148°43′34.24″E | |
| Boree Creek Public School | Boree Creek | Riverina | 1902 | 35°6′24.7″S 146°36′20.09″E | |
| Borenore Public School | Borenore | Central West | 1878 | 33°15′3.06″S 148°59′3.85″E | |
| Boronia Park Public School | Hunters Hill | Northern Sydney | 1928 | 33°49′17.44″S 151°8′7.54″E | |
| Bossley Park High School | Bossley Park | Greater West | 1988 | 33°52′14.89″S 150°52′30.2″E | |
| Bossley Park Public School | Bossley Park | Greater West | 1890 | 33°51′32.93″S 150°52′56.71″E | |
| Botany Bay Environmental Education Centre | Botany | Eastern Sydney | 1991 | 34°0′17.87″S 151°13′17.78″E | |
| Botany Public School | Botany | Eastern Sydney | 1849 | 33°56′33.22″S 151°11′41.97″E | |
| Bourke High School | Bourke | Far West | 1969 | 30°5′26.92″S 145°56′53.08″E | |
| Bourke Public School | Bourke | Far West | 1866 | 30°5′39.43″S 145°56′55.99″E | |
| Bourke Street Public School | Surry Hills | Inner Sydney | 1880 | 30°5′39.4″S 145°56′55.91″E | |
| Bournda Environmental Education Centre | Tathra | South Coast | 1976 | 36°47′27.14″S 149°55′38.91″E | |
| Bowen Public School | Orange | Central West | 1862 | 33°16′51.04″S 149°7′1.79″E | |
| Bowning Public School | Bowning | South West Slopes | 1849 | 34°46′11.17″S 148°48′40.88″E | |
| Bowral High School | Bowral | Southern Highlands | 1929 | 34°29′20.48″S 150°25′28.82″E | |
| Bowral Public School | Bowral | Southern Highlands | 1867 | 34°28′53.23″S 150°25′10.49″E | |
| Bowraville Central School | Bowraville | Mid North Coast | 1872 | 30°38′39.29″S 152°51′12.31″E | |
| Bradbury Public School | Bradbury | Macarthur | 1968 | 34°5′11.3″S 150°48′48.54″E | |
| Braddock Public School | Cranebrook | Greater West | 1981 | 33°43′20.29″S 150°42′30.33″E | |
| Bradfordville Public School | Bradfordville | Southern Tablelands | 1970 | 34°43′22.65″S 149°44′25.25″E | |
| Braidwood Central School | Braidwood | Southern Tablelands | 1849 | 35°26′28.94″S 149°47′51.94″E | |
| Branxton Public School | Branxton | Hunter | 1863 | 32°39′33.38″S 151°21′2.32″E | |
| Breadalbane Public School | Breadalbane | Southern Tablelands | 1875 | 34°47′25.83″S 149°29′15.41″E | |
| Bredbo Public School | Bredbo | Southern Tablelands | 1882 | 35°57′16.07″S 149°8′53.32″E | |
| Brewarrina Central School | Brewarrina | Orange | 1875 | 29°57′48.13″S 146°51′33.98″E | |
| Brewongle Environmental Education Centre | Sackville North | Hawkesbury | 1980 | 33°28′54.5″S 150°53′28.96″E | |
| Briar Road Public School | Airds | South Western Sydney | 1974 | 34°5′19.81″S 150°49′39.52″E | |
| Bribbaree Public School | Bribbaree | South West Slopes | 1894 | 34°7′11.67″S 147°52′29.59″E | |
| Bridge Road School | Camperdown | Inner West | 1962 | 33°53′14.18″S 151°10′31.02″E | |
| Brighton-Le-Sands Public School | Brighton-Le-Sands | St George | 1916 | 33°57′45.04″S 151°8′56.48″E | |
| Bringelly Public School | Bringelly | South Western Sydney | 1878 | 33°56′18.11″S 150°43′48.1″E | |
| Brisbane Water Secondary College - Umina Campus | Umina Beach | Central Coast | 1976 | 33°30′23.81″S 151°18′33.97″E | |
| Brisbane Water Secondary College - Woy Woy Campus | Woy Woy | Central Coast | 1962 | 33°29′34.37″S 151°19′28.69″E | |
| Brisbania Public School | Saratoga | Central Coast | 1941 | 33°28′42.97″S 151°21′27.94″E | |
| Broadwater Public School | Broadwater | Northern Rivers | 1881 | 29°0′10.09″S 153°26′13.59″E | |
| Brocklesby Public School | Brocklesby | Riverina | 1898 | 35°49′25.44″S 146°40′44.12″E | |
| Broderick Gillawarna School | Revesby | South Western Sydney | 1954 | 33°56′32.62″S 151°0′57.62″E | |
| Broke Public School | Broke | Hunter | 1871 | 32°44′43.83″S 151°6′14.77″E | |
| Broken Hill High School | Broken Hill | Far West | 1920 | 31°57′37.2″S 141°27′25.75″E | |
| Broken Hill North Public School | Broken Hill | Far West | 1890 | 31°56′40.55″S 141°28′19.87″E | |
| Broken Hill Public School | Broken Hill | Far West | 1886 | 31°57′25.24″S 141°27′23.44″E | |
| Bronte Public School | Bronte | Eastern Sydney | 1927 | 33°54′2.01″S 151°15′44.09″E | |
| Brooke Avenue Public School | Killarney Vale | Central Coast | 1985 | 33°22′32.11″S 151°27′55.03″E | |
| Brooklyn Public School | Brooklyn | Northern Sydney | 1871 | 33°32′53.66″S 151°12′54.73″E | |
| Brookvale Public School | Brookvale | Northern Beaches | 1887 | 33°45′42.13″S 151°16′14.26″E | |
| Broulee Public School | Broulee | South Coast | 1995 | 35°50′44.33″S 150°10′18.64″E | |
| Brungle Public School | Brungle | Riverina | 1898 | 35°9′24.71″S 148°13′58.75″E | |
| Brunswick Heads Public School | Brunswick Heads | Northern Rivers | 1888 | 28°32′28.1″S 153°33′2.71″E | |
| Budawang School | Ulladulla | South Coast | 1994 | 35°19′19.85″S 150°26′30.79″E | |
| Budgewoi Public School | Budgewoi | Central Coast | 1961 | 33°13′34.67″S 151°32′54.16″E | |
| Bulahdelah Central School | Bulahdelah | Mid North Coast | 1878 | 32°24′47.03″S 152°12′44.11″E | |
| Bullarah Public School | Bullarah | North West Slopes | 1959 | 29°28′15.32″S 149°13′43.86″E | |
| Bulli High School | Bulli | Illawarra | 1956 | 34°20′11.12″S 150°55′15.98″E | |
| Bulli Public School | Bulli | illawarra | 1869 | 34°19′37.48″S 150°54′44.73″E | |
| Bullimbal School | South Tamworth | New England | 1985 | 31°6′23.06″S 150°55′9.1″E | |
| Bundanoon Public School | Bundanoon | Southern Highlands | 1870 | 34°39′27.85″S 150°18′0.95″E | |
| Bundarra Central School | Bundarra | New England | 1868 | 30°10′4.38″S 151°4′34.15″E | |
| Bundeena Public School | Bundeena | Sutherland Shire | 1849 | 34°5′11.55″S 151°9′9.5″E | |
| Bungendore Public School | Bungendore | Southern Tablelands | 1868 | 35°15′23.09″S 149°26′41.72″E | |
| Bungwahl Public School | Bungwahl | Mid North Coast | 1876 | 32°23′21.44″S 152°26′54.59″E | |
| Bunnaloo Public School | Bunnaloo | Riverina | 1928 | 35°47′10.52″S 144°35′50.41″E | |
| Burke Ward Public School | Broken Hill | Far West | 1895 | 31°57′37.43″S 141°26′27.53″E | |
| Burnside Public School | Oatlands | Greater West | 1922 | 33°47′35.31″S 151°1′5.53″E | |
| Buronga Public School | Buronga | Far West | 1942 | 34°10′10.69″S 142°10′55.01″E | |
| Burraneer Bay Public School | Burraneer | Southern Sydney | 1893 | 34°3′4.78″S 151°7′59.17″E | |
| Burrawang Public School | Burrawang | Southern Highlands | 1878 | 34°35′33.48″S 150°30′57.52″E | |
| Burren Junction Public School | Burren Junction | North West Slopes | 1904 | 30°6′10.58″S 148°57′51.5″E | |
| Burringbar Public School | Burringbar | Northern Rivers | 1894 | 28°26′9.85″S 153°27′59.42″E | |
| Burrumbuttock Public School | Burrumbuttock | Riverina | 1889 | 35°50′15.49″S 146°48′0.41″E | |
| Burwood Girls High School | Croydon | Inner West | 1929 | 33°52′32.69″S 151°6′46.33″E | |
| Burwood Public School | Burwood | Inner West | 1871 | 33°52′37.1″S 151°5′59.2″E | |
| Busby Public School | Busby | Greater West | 1962 | 33°54′42.05″S 150°52′53.95″E | |
| Buxton Public School | Buxton | Macarthur | 1894 | 34°14′50.01″S 150°32′39.49″E | |
| Byron Bay High School | Byron Bay | Northern Rivers | 1987 | 28°40′0.76″S 153°36′54.64″E | |
| Byron Bay Public School | Byron Bay | Northern Rivers | 1892 | 28°38′51.4″S 153°36′52.52″E | |

== See also ==
Organisations

- Education in New South Wales
- New South Wales Education Standards Authority
- Australian Curriculum

Lists

- List of schools in New South Wales
- List of government schools in New South Wales
- List of non-government schools in New South Wales
- List of selective high schools in New South Wales
- List of Catholic schools in New South Wales
- List of Anglican schools in New South Wales
- List of Islamic schools in New South Wales
- Lists of schools in Australia
