= Tweed Heads =

City in New South Wales, Australia

- City
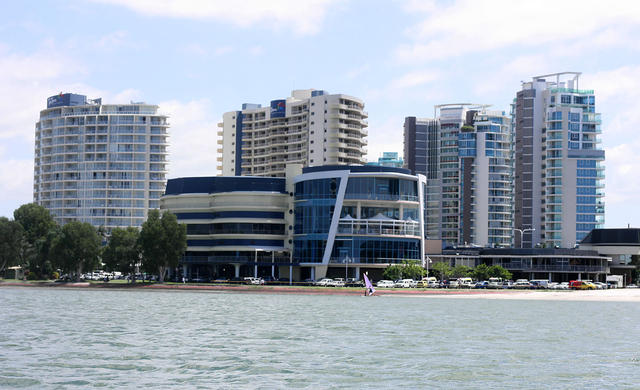
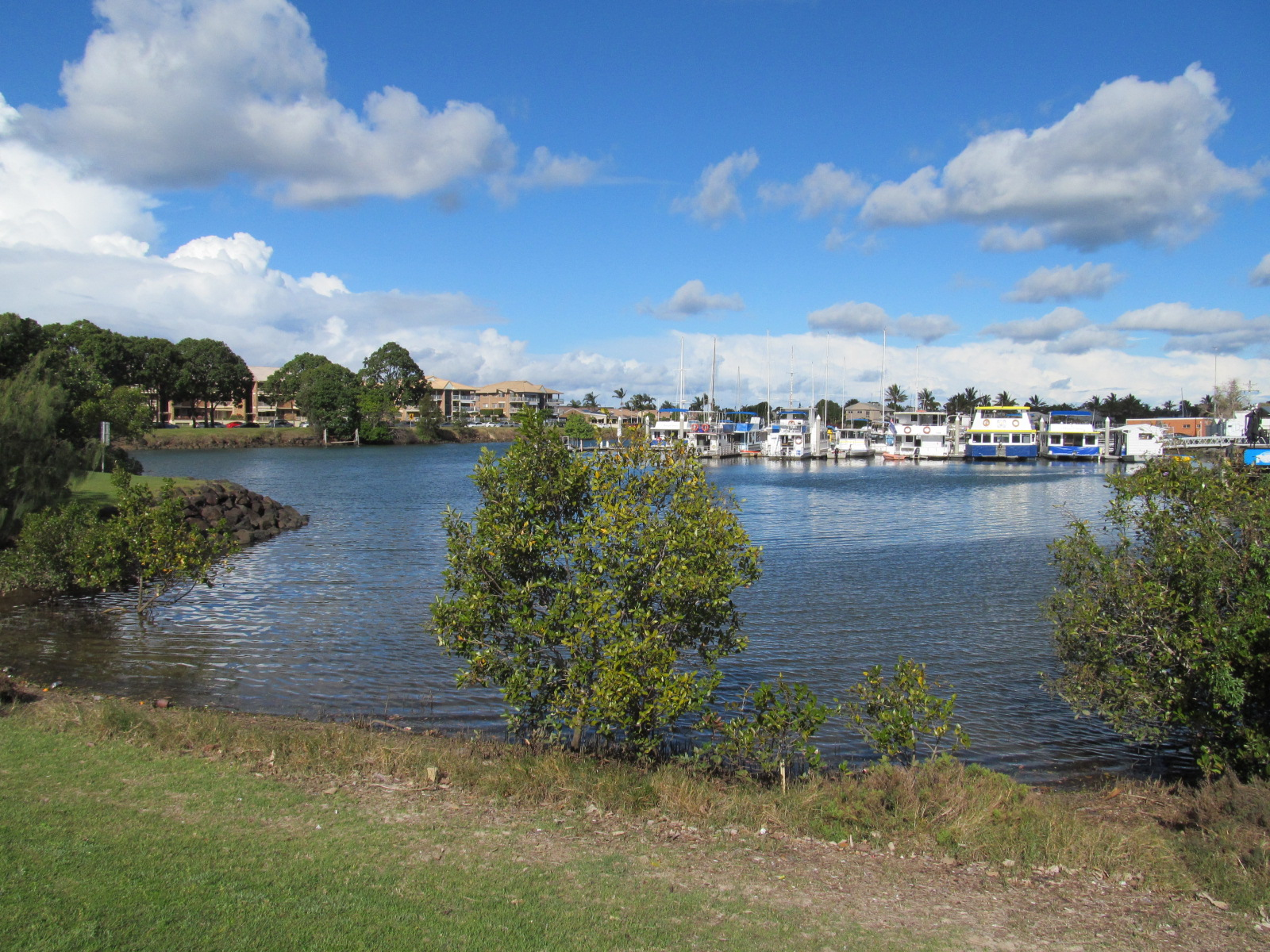
- From top: Twin Towns Clubs & Resorts, Tweed Heads Marina

- Coordinates: 28°11′0″S 153°33′0″E
- Country: Australia
- State: New South Wales
- Region: Northern Rivers
- LGA: Tweed Shire
- Location: 830 km (520 mi) NNE of Sydney; 103 km (64 mi) SSE of Brisbane; 99 km (62 mi) NE of Lismore; 66 km (41 mi) N of Byron Bay; 34 km (21 mi) SSE of Gold Coast
- Established: 1844

Government
  - State electorate: Tweed
  - Federal division: Richmond
- Elevation: 1 m (3.3 ft)

Population
  - Total: 63,721 (UCL 2021)
- Time zone: UTC+10 (AEST)
  - Summer (DST): UTC+11 (AEDT)
- Postcode: 2485, 2486, 2487, 2488
- County: Rous
- Parish: Terranora
- Mean max temp: 25.8 °C (78.4 °F)
- Mean min temp: 14.4 °C (57.9 °F)
- Annual rainfall: 1,581.5 mm (62.26 in)

Tweed Heads is a coastal city at the mouth of the Tweed River in the Northern Rivers region of the state of New South Wales, Australia. Tweed Heads is the northernmost town in New South Wales, and is located in the Tweed Shire local government area. It is situated 830 km (520 mi) north of Sydney and 103 km (64 mi) south of Brisbane. The town is next to the border with Queensland and is adjacent to its "twin town" of Coolangatta, which is a suburb of the Gold Coast in Queensland.

== Origin of place name ==
Tweed Heads was first known to Europeans as 'Crown Village'. It was later known as 'Cooloon', which was taken from the Yugambeh–Bundjalung language word kulun, which either means 'blue fig' or 'tick'. The name fell out of common usage and many started calling the area Tweed Heads in the early 20th century. The name was not formally changed until 1965 and choice of name was likely due to its closeness to the Tweed River.

== History ==
In 1823 John Oxley was the first European to see the Tweed Valley, and he wrote of it:

A deep rich valley clothed with magnificent trees, the beautiful uniformity of which was only interrupted by the turns and windings of the river, which here and there appeared like small lakes. The background was Mt. Warning. The view was altogether beautiful beyond description. The scenery here exceeded anything I have previously seen in Australia.

The first European to live in the Tweed Valley were cedar cutters in 1844, who searched the dense rainforest for red cedar (Toona ciliata, formerly T. australis) to selectively log, and then ship to Sydney.

After the Robertson land act, 150 hectare were made available to be selected, and the timber was cleared to make way for exotic paspalum pasture for dairy farming.

Later, some of the cleared land was planted as sugar cane and bananas, and a fishing industry was also developed. The first school opened in 1871.

In May 1888, 119 subdivided lots of "Boyd Estate" were advertised to be auctioned by W. H. Brett. A map advertising the auction shows that the estate was located next to the Tweed River.

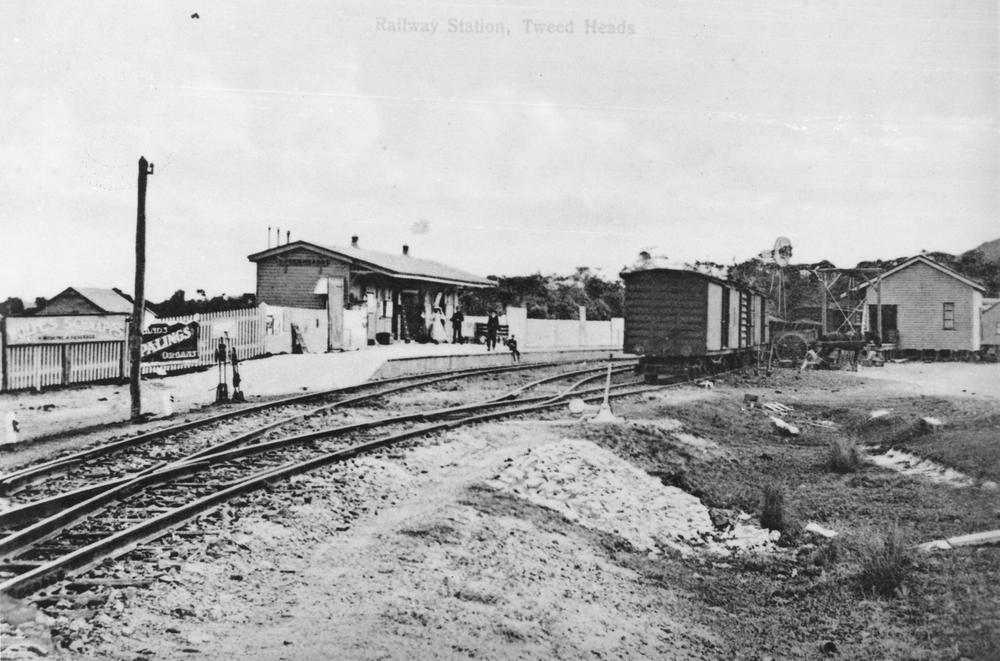
Tweed Heads station, circa 1911

The Tweed Heads and Coolangatta Surf Life Saving Club opened on 13 September 1911.

In April 1916, 69 allotments of "Charles' Tweed Heads subdivision were advertised to be auctioned by P. Smith & Son. A map advertising the auction shows the location of the estate in proximity to Terranora Creek.

In November 1917, 46 subdivided allotments of "Marks Estate" were advertised for auction by S. A. Thornton. A map advertising the auction illustrates the location of the estate in proximity to Terranora Creek, Coolangatta and the Pacific Ocean and describes the allotments as perfectly flat, large areas with splendid frontages.

The Tweed Shire, inclusive of Murwillumbah, was declared in 1947.

Tweed Heads was the location of fictional town Porpoise Spit in the 1994 movie Muriel's Wedding.

In April 2020, checkpoint barriers were established in Tweed streets near the state border to restrict travel into Queensland during the COVID-19 pandemic.

== City and suburbs ==
The urban boundaries of Tweed Heads extend south along the coastline to Hastings Point, and westward along the Terranora Creek encompassing Bilambil Heights and Terranora. This area includes the suburbs and localities of:

- Banora Point
- Bilambil Heights
- Bogangar
- Cabarita Beach
- Casuarina
- Chinderah
- Fingal Head
- Hastings Point
- Kingscliff
- Terranora
- Tweed Heads
- Tweed Heads South
- Tweed Heads West

== Transport ==
=== Rail ===
Tweed Heads was once connected to the Queensland Railways system, with the South Coast line providing a direct connection to Brisbane. The railway opened on 10 August 1903. It had been hoped that the New South Wales government would extend their railway line from Murwillumbah to Tweed Heads, but this did not occur due to cost of resuming the land and the expenses associated with the tunnel and bridge that would be required. The Tweed Heads railway station was located on the western side of Enid Street between Bay Street and Frances Street (28.17193°S 153.54073°E). The railway line to Brisbane closed in 1961, and the site of the station has since been converted to parklands and commercial development.

=== Road ===
The Pacific Motorway bisects the urban area, and has been freeway standard since the completion of the section through Banora Point in 2012. Tweed Heads is also the southern terminus for the Gold Coast Highway, which was extended to Tweed Heads West from its former terminus in Tugun following completion of the bypass in 2007. The main arterial roads, Minjungbal Drive and Wharf Street, are the former alignent of the Pacific Highway.

=== Air ===
Tweed Heads is served by Gold Coast Airport, which straddles the state border and is partly located in Tweed Heads West.

=== Public transport ===
Bus services are mostly operated by Kinetic Gold Coast on behalf of Transport for NSW, who serve the urban area as well as neighbouring Murwillumbah. Tweed Heads is also the southern terminus for Translink buses, which provide a connection to the Gold Coast railway line at Varsity Lakes and to the G:link tram at Broadbeach South. Intercity coaches run by Greyhound Australia, NSW TrainLink, and Premier Motor Service also link Tweed Heads with Brisbane, Casino and Sydney.

== Media ==
Given the Tweed Heads is on the QLD border, most of the city's radio stations are received from the Gold Coast such as ABC Gold Coast, 92.5 Triple M Gold, Hot Tomato, Rebel FM, Radio 97, Radio Metro, Juice107.3 and community based station, Mayhem Radio. However, radio stations broadcast from Lismore and Murwillumbah can also be received in Tweed Heads.

== Tourism ==
Given its proximity to the Gold Coast, Tweed Heads has a shared economy with Coolangatta based heavily on tourism.

Tweed Heads' most popular tourist destinations include Mount Warning, one of the largest shield volcanoes in the Southern Hemisphere, and the nearby Nightcap, Border Ranges, Springbrook and Lamington National Parks, which abound with sub-tropical fauna and flora.

== Education ==
- Banora Point Primary School
- Centaur Primary School
- St James Primary School
- Banora Point High School
- St Joseph's College
- Pacific Coast Christian School

== Demographics ==
Historical population
Year	Pop.	±%
1954	2,467	—
1961	3,291	+33.4%
1966	3,829	+16.3%
1971	5,120	+33.7%
1976	13,190	+157.6%
1981	21,869	+65.8%
1986	19,615	−10.3%
1991	22,981	+17.2%
1996	37,775	+64.4%
2001	44,655	+18.2%
2006	51,788	+16.0%
2011	55,553	+7.3%
2016	59,776	+7.6%
2021	63,721	+6.6%
Source: Australian Bureau of Statistics data.

In the 2021 census, The Tweed Heads urban centre had 63,721 people. In the same year, the Tweed Heads suburb recorded a population of 8,176 people made up of 52.9 percent female and 47.1 percent male. Aboriginal and Torres Strait Islander people made up 3.0% of the population. The median age of the population was 55 years, 17 years above the Australian median. This has made the Tweed Heads region a prime location for retirement living, with 14 separate retirement villages. 70.9% of people were born in Australia. The next most common countries of birth were England 5.0%, New Zealand 3.7%, Brazil 2.3% and the Philippines 1.0%. 83.8% of people spoke only English at home.

The most common responses for religion were No Religion 37.9%, Catholic 22.1% and Anglican 15.3%.

Composition of the Tweed Heads urban area Population by Statistical Local Area:

View source data.
- Tweed Heads
- Tweed Heads South
- Kingscliff – Fingal Head
- Pottsville

== Sport and recreation ==
Due to its close proximity, Tweed Heads sports teams often compete in Gold Coast/Queensland-based competitions, and the area acts as a feeder zone for both the Gold Coast Titans in the National Rugby League and the Gold Coast Suns in the Australian Football League. Tweed United is a soccer Club based in the area that competes in the Football Gold Coast competition plus the Coolangatta Tweed Barbarians who compete in the Gold Coast and District Rugby Union.

Other sports facilities in the area include Northern Rivers Baseball Club, Tweed Heads Motorcycle Enthusiasts Club, Tweed Banora Colts Cricket Club, Tweed Hockey Club, Tweed Netball Association, Tweed Heads Bowls Club, Tweed River Jockey Club, Tweed Valley Equestrian Group, Tweed River Water Ski Club, Tweed Valley Triathletes-Triathlon Club, Tweed Heads Tennis Club, Tweed Heads Croquet Club, Tweed Coolangatta Dart Club, Tweed Coolangatta Fishing Club, Coolangatta Tweed Pinball Club, Coolangatta & Tweed Heads Golf Club, Dbah Boardriders, Tweed Heads & Coolangatta Rowing Club, Tweed Valley Sailing Club and Tweed Heads & Coolangatta Surf Life Saving Club.

=== Rugby league ===
Tweed Heads was once home to several iterations of professional rugby league clubs in the New South Wales Rugby League (NSWRL) competition between 1988 and 1995. The Gold Coast-Tweed Giants were established in 1988 and based out of the Tweed Heads Seagulls premises in west Tweed Heads. The Seagulls ran a very successful social club that turned large profits due to poker machines and by 1990 the club had acquired the Giants' NSWRL licence and rebranded the team to become the Gold Coast Seagulls, despite remaining based in Tweed Heads. The team pulled off its biggest coup in 1990 when it signed future Rugby League Immortal Wally Lewis. After years of poor on field results and low attendances, the Seagulls sold their NSWRL licence to businessman Jeff Muller who moved the team to Carrara on the Gold Coast.

The Seagulls returned to the Group 18 Rugby League competition in 1996 and were granted entry into the Queensland Cup in 2003. Australian rules football was brought to the area in 1962 when the Coolangatta Tweed Heads Australian Football Club. It was intended to represent the twin towns of Coolangatta and Tweed Heads and competed in the Gold Coast Australian Football League competition. In 1984 the Northern Rivers region established the Summerland Australian Football League that later included the Tweed Coast Football Club. The league was amalgamated into Queensland Australian Football League as its own division in 2012.

== Notable people ==
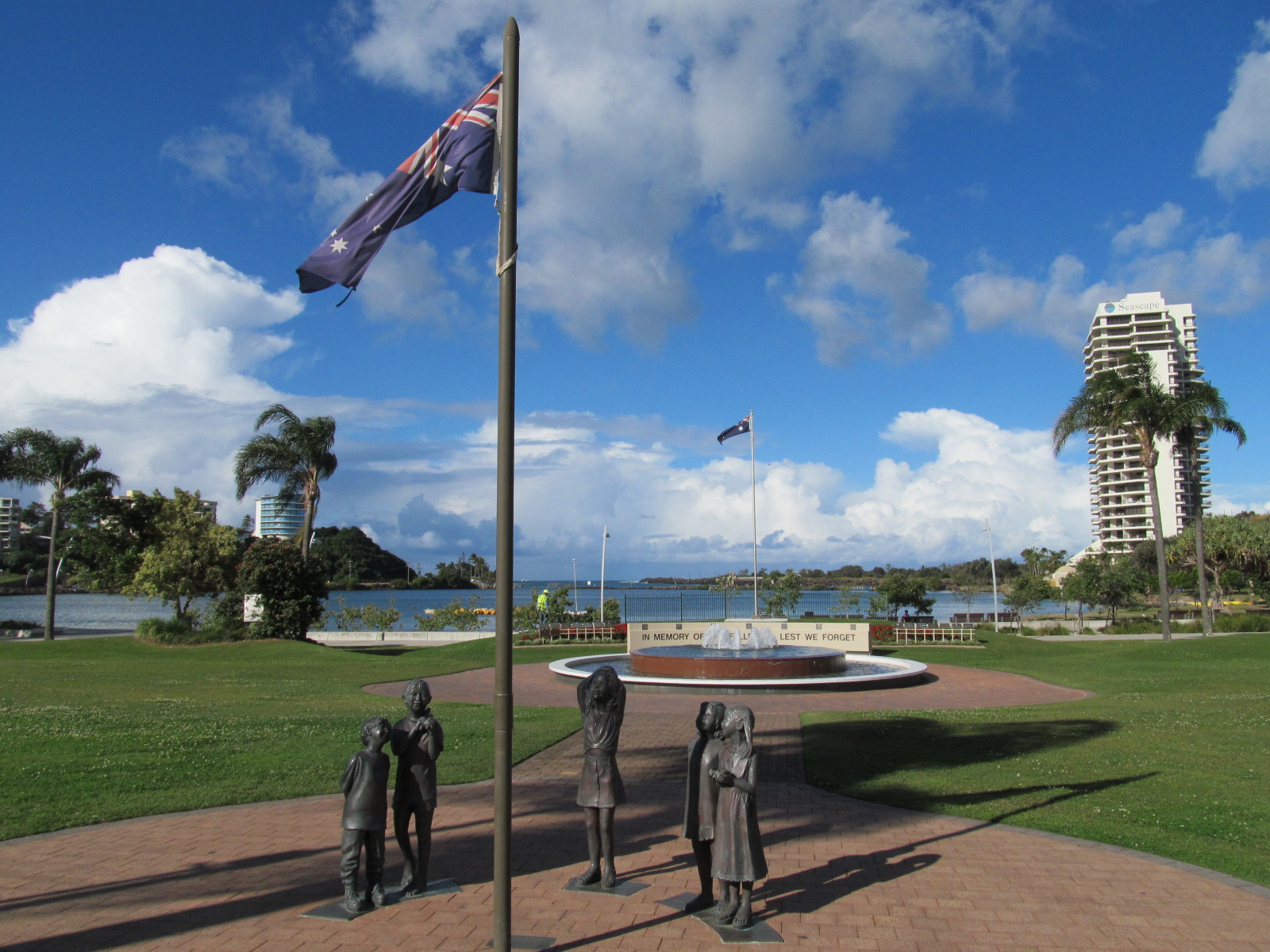
War memorial in Chris Cunningham Park

The following is a list of notable people who were born, resided, or died in Tweed Heads:

- Wayne Bartholomew, world champion surfer
- Cheyse Blair, rugby league footballer
- Neville Bonner, Aboriginal Australian Member of Parliament and Senator
- Trevor Butler, 2004 Big Brother Australia winner
- Larry Corowa, rugby league footballer
- Brad Davis, rugby league footballer
- Steve Edmed, rugby league footballer
- Mick Fanning, world champion surfer
- Sam Gilbert, Australian rules footballer
- Stephanie Gilmore, world champion surfer
- Michael Gordon, rugby league footballer
- David Hale, Australian rules footballer
- Samantha Harris, fashion model
- P. J. Hogan, film director and screenwriter
- Daniel Holdsworth, rugby league footballer
- Ryan James, rugby league footballer
- Jesse Joyce, Australian rules footballer
- Kayne Lawton, rugby league footballer
- Tom Learoyd-Lahrs, rugby league footballer
- Marc Lock, Australian rules footballer
- Lionel Morgan, rugby league footballer
- Barry Muir, rugby league footballer
- Luke O'Dwyer, rugby league footballer
- Mark Occhilupo, world champion surfer
- Joel Parkinson, world champion surfer
- Cedric Popkin, soldier who may have killed Manfred von Richthofen during World War I
- Tony Rampling, rugby league footballer
- Kieran Ricketts, journalist, broadcaster, and filmmaker
- James Roberts, Australian Olympic swimmer
- Matt Seers, rugby league footballer
- Elwyn Walters, rugby league footballer
- Jarrad Wright, creator and star of The Big Lez Show

== See also ==
- Tweed Shire
