= Tweed Heads South, New South Wales =

Suburb of Tweed Heads, New South Wales, Australia

Tweed Heads South
- Suburb
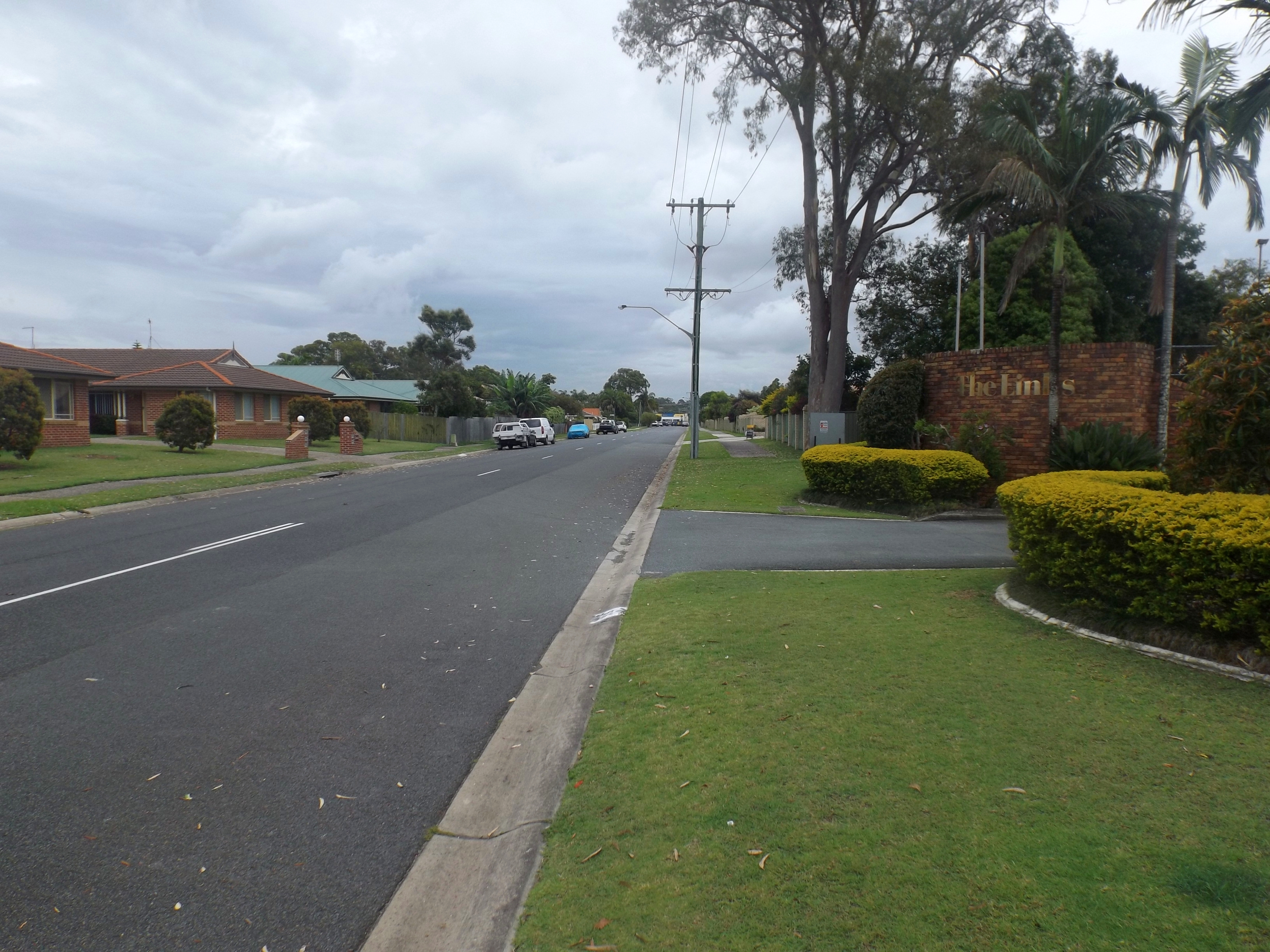
- Soorley Street, 2017

- Interactive map of Tweed Heads South
- Coordinates: 28°11′39″S 153°32′21″E
- Country: Australia
- State: New South Wales
- LGA: Tweed Shire
- Location: 103 km (64 mi) SSE of Brisbane; 61 km (38 mi) N of Byron Bay; 3 km (1.9 mi) S of Tweed Heads; 814 km (506 mi) N of Sydney

Government
  - State electorate: Tweed
  - Federal division: Richmond
- Elevation: 6 m (20 ft)

Population
  - Total: 7,941 (2021 census)
- Time zone: UTC+10 (AEST)
  - Summer (DST): UTC+11 (AEDT)
- Postcode: 2486
Suburbs around Tweed Heads South
Tweed Heads West	Tweed Heads	Fingal Head
Bilambil Heights	Tweed Heads South	Fingal Head
Banora Point	Chinderah	Fingal Head

Tweed Heads South is a suburb located on the Tweed River in the Northern Rivers region of New South Wales, Australia, in the Tweed Shire.

== Demographics ==
In the 2011 census, Tweed Heads South recorded a population of 7,902 people, 53.3% female and 46.7% male. The median age of the Tweed Heads South population was 52 years, 15 years above the national median of 37. 72.3% of people living in Tweed Heads South were born in Australia. The other top responses for country of birth were England 8.4%, New Zealand 3.5%, Scotland 1%, China 0.8%, Philippines 0.7%. 89.5% of people spoke only English at home; the next most common languages were 0.6% Mandarin, 0.3% Tagalog, 0.3% German, 0.3% Cantonese, 0.3% Thai.

== Sport and recreation ==
A number of well-known sporting clubs are located in Tweed Heads South including South Tweed RLFC and Tweed Banora Colts Cricket Club, who play home games at Dave Burns Field. Tweed United Soccer Club is a men's and women's junior and senior soccer club based at Arkinstall Park. South Tweed Skatepark is also located in Tweed Heads South next to Tweed River High School on Heffron Street.

Coolangatta & Tweed Heads Golf Club is also in Tweed Heads South.
