= Early life of Mark and Steve Waugh =

The early life of Mark and Steve Waugh, a set of twins who played Test and ODI cricket for Australia from the 1980s to the 2000s, was characterised by their steady rise through the sporting rankings in a variety of sports.

== Birth ==
Born at Canterbury Hospital on 2 June 1965, Mark Edward Waugh and Stephen Rodger Waugh are fraternal twins born to Rodger and Beverley Waugh. Mark arrived four minutes after Steve. Their father was a bank official and their mother was a teacher within the New South Wales Department of Education. The family settled in the western Sydney suburb of Panania. The twins were later joined by two more brothers, Dean and Danny. From an early age, the parents introduced their children to sport. By the age of six, the twins were playing organised soccer, tennis and cricket. In their first cricket match, the brothers were both dismissed for ducks.

== Family heritage ==
The twins came from a sporting family. Their paternal grandfather Edward was a greyhound trainer. Raised in the northern coastal town of Bangalow, Edward earned selection for the New South Wales Country team in rugby league. He was about to join Eastern Suburbs in the New South Wales Rugby League, but had to give up his career to nurse his wife, who was ill with polio. Rodger was Edward's only son; as a tennis player, he was ranked eighth in Australia in his junior years, in an era when Australia was the dominant power. He played against Tony Roche and John Newcombe and was the state champion at under-14 level. On the maternal side, Bev was a tennis player who won the under-14 singles at the South Australian Championships. Her eldest brother Dion Bourne was an opening batsman who played for Bankstown in Sydney Grade Cricket and remains the leading runscorer in the club's history.

== Junior career ==
The twins made their first representative cricket team when they were selected the Bankstown District under-10s at the age of eight. They were both sent off the field because their sleeves were of the wrong colour—Bev had knitted on the colours of the team, but everyone else was wearing plain white. In 1976, the twins were the youngest ever to be selected in the New South Wales Primary Schools' soccer team. Playing for Panania Primary School, the twins swept their school to win the Umbro International Shield, a statewide knockout soccer competition, scoring all of their team's three goals in the final. They were a key part of their school's consecutive state cricket championships, and were part of the school tennis team that came second in the state in their final year. In their final year, Mark was the captain of the state primary school cricket and tennis teams, both of which won the national championships. Steve was the vice-captain of the cricket team and captained the state soccer team. The twins were instrumental in New South Wales winning the cricket carnival without a defeat, in one match combining in a partnership of 150.

By this time, the increasing time demands led to conflicts between the sports, and the twins were delisted from the Bankstown Junior Soccer Association for missing a representative team. At the time, both were away playing tennis and soccer for the state age group team. Bankstown were unrepentant, so the twins registered with Auburn in soccer. The twins progressed to East Hills Boys Technology High School, which had a history of producing Australian international representatives in a number of sports. The school later educated quintuple-Olympic gold medallist Ian Thorpe.

Aged 13, the twins were invited by their uncle Bourne, then the captain of Bankstown's first grade team, to trial for the club's under-16 team for the Green Shield. They gained selection, but neither averaged more than 20 for the season. Aged fourteen, both made their senior grade cricket debut in 1979–1980, playing in the Fourth XI. The twins broke into East Hills Boys First XI in the same season, and achieved the same level in soccer. In 1980, the twins began playing for Auburn in the state soccer league. The twins generally played two games in a row, in their proper age group, before again with older boys. The same occurred in cricket, where they played in age group competitions in the morning before playing grade cricket in the afternoon. In 1980–81 the brothers were elevated to the Third XI mid-season. Mark's performance in the Green Shield saw him selected in Bankstown's under-21 team, still aged 15.

The brothers often won formed a two-man team—in one match against Bankstown Boys High School, Mark scored a century and then the brothers took 16/85 between them. At the end of 1980, the twins were selected in the state under-16 team for the national carnival, with Mark as vice-captain.

When Mark was 16, he grew around one foot in one year. It was a relief, because he had been diagnosed with the repetitive stress injury Osgood-Schlatter disease at 15, and told that he would not grow any further than his then height of 152 cm. The pair changed soccer teams to play in the reserve grade for Sydney Croatia in the state league. Mark was a defender while Steve was a forward, and the pair were paid small amounts in the professional league. However, they quickly left as their cricket careers increasingly demanded more time.

The brothers were promoted to Bankstown's Second XI, before being selected for the First XI in the 1982–83 season, aged 17, both making their debut against Western Suburbs. Mark made 97 on debut, opening against a bowling attack that included Test player Greg Matthews. Steve was dropped back to the Second XI, but Mark stayed in top division and ended the season with 427 runs at 30.50. This placed him second in his team's aggregates and he contributed 14 wickets at 10.71. By this time, his coaches had already identified the traits by which Mark was to be characterised in his international career. The Bankstown yearbook noted that "accomplished . . . apart from the occasional lazy shot in no-man's land . . . A very good right-hand medium-pace bowler and one of the safest pairs of hands." Steve was regarded as an aggressive player, something that characterised his early international career.

The twins finished high school at the end of 1983. In 1983–84, both were members of New South Wales Combined High Schools and the state under-19 team. Mark was named as the player of the series in the New South Wales Schoolboys Championships, having scored 132 not out against Combined Associated Schools and then 105 not out and 4/32 against Combined Catholic Colleges. Steve made 170 against Great Public Schools. The brothers were then selected for Australia for the first time. They had been named in the national under-19 team to play a Test and ODI series against the touring Sri Lankan counterparts.

The under-19 series pitted several future international players against one another. Opening batsman Mark Taylor later went on to captain the Waugh brothers in the senior national team, while Craig McDermott was to break into international cricket less than a year later and lead the Australian pace attack for the next decade. Mark scored 123 in the Second Test at the Adelaide Oval, before Steve scored 187 in the Third Test at Melbourne as Australia won 1–0.

During the season, the brothers began life after high school. Mark did not contemplate going to university and both became sports equipment salesmen. Steve had enrolled in a teaching course, but withdrew after a few lectures. Both brothers made their maiden First XI century during the season; Mark scored 108 against Mosman, while Steve scored centuries against Sydney University and Waverley.

At the start of the 1984–85 season, the brothers were included in the New South Wales state squad.
