= Bunnaloo Football Club =

Bunnaloo

Names
- Full name: Bunnaloo Football Club
- Nickname: The Loo

Club details
- Founded: 1927, 1952
- Dissolved: 1989
- Colours: Green Gold
- Competition: Echuca Football League
- Premierships: 1988, 1989
- Former ground: Bunnaloo Recreation Reserve
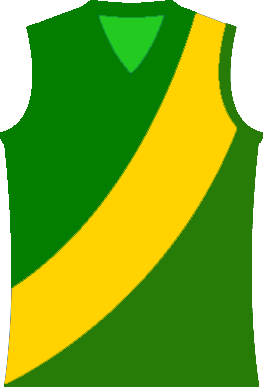
- Guernsey

The Bunnaloo Football Club was an Australian rules football club based in the town of Bunnaloo, New South Wales, which first formed in 1927, before disbanding in the 1929. The team reformed in 1952 to join the newly created Echuca Football League, before folding at the end of the 1989 season.

== History ==
The formation of the Bunnaloo Football Club was first announced when an advertisement appeared in the Riverine Herald (the local Echuca newspaper), asking for umpires for the soon-to-be-formed W F Association, a football league. In 1927, the Wakool Walliston Bunnaloo Football Association was formed featuring four teams: Wakool, Walliston, Bunnaloo and Caldwell. This was Bunnaloo's first football team, with J Keech acting as captain. In 1929 the league was renamed the Womboota and District Football League, with Womboota replacing the team from Walliston. Bunnaloo finished the season in first place, but lost the premiership to Wakool.

At the closure of the 1929 season, the league was disbanded. The Bunnaloo Football club played next in 1933, in two games against Caldwell, the first home and the second away. Bunnaloo won the home match on 8 July, with the away game played in Caldwell two weeks later. The Bunnaloo Football Club was not active again until 1945, when it played a series of matches against Womboota. The team, captained by Arthur Tomlinson, won two and lost two of the four matches.

In 1951, the planned Echuca Football League was announced, with Bunnaloo featured in the original line-up. When it formed in 1952, the Bunnaloo club was reformed and joined the league with teams from Mathoura, Moama, Bamawm Extension, Bamawm and Rochester East. The club remained in this league for the remainder of its existence. In 1988 and 1989 Bunnaloo won back-to-back premierships, and following the 1989 premiership was forced to cease existence. 1990 marked the closure of the Echuca Football League, which merged with the Northern District Football League to become the Northern & Echuca Football League. Bunnaloo was unable to find enough players to field a team.

== Premierships ==
League	Total flags	Premiership year(s)
Echuca Football League	2	1988, 1989

== Honour Board ==
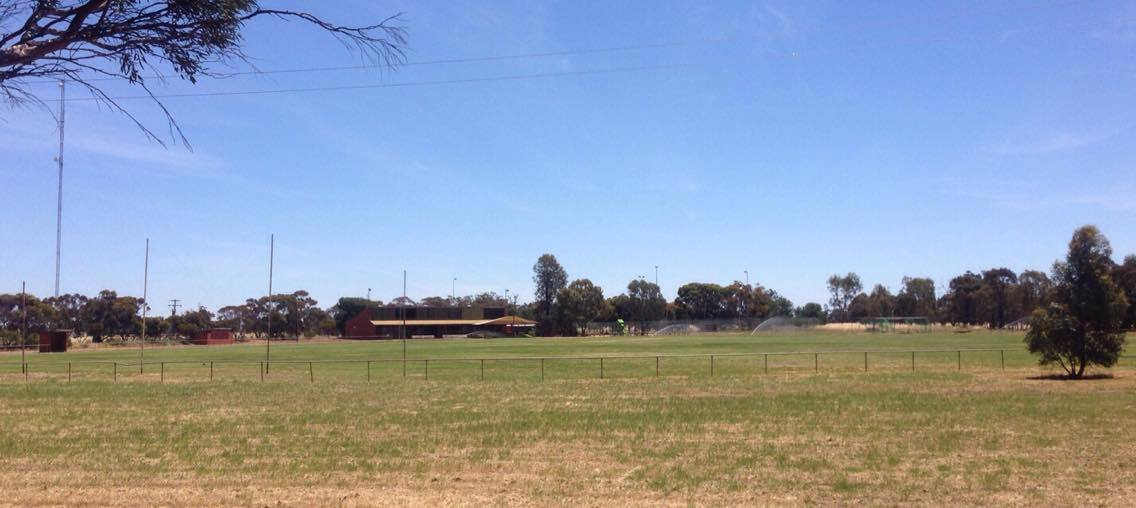
Bunnaloo Recreation Reserve, home of the former Bunnaloo Football Club (2016)

Year	President	Secretary	Coach	Best & Fairest
1952	C Burgess	B Hubbard	T Madgwick	T Madgwick
1953	C Burgess	W Ripper	T Madgwick	K Durrant
1954	C Burgess	W Ripper	K Doyle	K Durrant
1955	H Gamble	W Ripper	K Doyle	G Burgess
1956	H Gamble	W Ripper	K Doyle	G Burgess
1957	H Holschier	W Ripper	J Preston	K Durrant
1958	H Holschier	D Morrison, D Gamble	J Preston	J Preston
1959	H Holschier	D Gamble	T Burgess	G Burgess
1960	K Doyle	L Vagg	J Carvill	R Bremner
1961	K Doyle	L Vagg	R Crack	J Preston
1962	K Doyle	L Vagg	R Crack	K Crack
1963	T Burgess	W Ripper	L Baker	K Crack
1964	T Burgess	W Ripper	T Galvin	J Walter
1965	J Walter Snr	W Ripper	T Galvin	B White
1966	J Walter Snr	T Galvin	W Stiles	L Berryman
1967	J Walter Snr	R Kemp	W Stiles	L Berryman
1968	D Jackson	R Kemp	B White	D Jackson
1969	B MacKenzie	R Kemp	D Henderson	A Caldwell
1970	B MacKenzie	B Thompson	B Mackie, D Henderson	B Thompson
1971	B MacKenzie	B Thompson	J Clark	B Thompson
1972	K Schulz	B Thompson	J Clark	P Cole
1973	K Schulz	B Thompson	G Chivers	A Caldwell
1974	J Walter Snr	B Thompson	G Chivers	J Hartshorn
1975	J Walter	R Jeffs	G Chivers	J Hartshorn
1976	D Roberts	L Gardiner	R Farrell	J Hartshorn
1977	D Roberts	R Jeffs	R Farrell	M Vagg
1978	D Roberts	G Beer	R Farrell	J Hartshorn
1979	H Holshier	J Carter	R Farrell	L Hiller
1980	H Holshier	J Carter, A Cossar	R Douglas	J Hartshorn
1981	J Carter	N Blenkiron	R Douglas	A Willoughby
1982	W Polglase	N Blenkiron	B Walton	J Hartshorn
1983	W Polglase	N Blenkiron	J Smith	R Caldwell
1984	R Crack	J Burgess	R Carr	G Nisbet
1985	P Rinaldi	N Blenkiron	G Wagstaff	R Caldwell
1986	P Rinaldi	N Blenkiron	A Farrell	R Caldwell
1987	P Rinaldi	J Hearn	A Preston	G Edwards
1988*	P Rinaldi	D Larcombe	A Jones, A Preston	A Jones
1989*	C Douglas	D Larcombe, M Blenkiron	A Jones, S Duncan	A Ogden
"*" denotes a premiership year.

=== Echuca Football League Best and Fairest ===
- Leigh White (1965)

== See also ==
- Bunnaloo, New South Wales
- Bunnaloo Public School
