= Carenne School =

Location
- Bathurst, New South Wales; Australia; 33.42577°S 149.56614°E

Information
- Type: Public, co-educational, special, day school
- Motto: Quality Education, Towards Independence
- Established: 1957
- Principal: Jane Crosland
- Enrolment: 81
- Campus: Rural
- Colours: Royal blue & gold
- Website: www.carenne-s.schools.nsw.edu.au

Carenne School is a school for disabled students in Bathurst, New South Wales, Australia. It was established in 1957 as Glenray School. It has 81 students and 30 staff.

== History ==
When Carenne was first established it was known as Glenray School and housed in a disused stable at the rear of the Uniting Church in Bathurst. It opened on 17 July 1957 with one teacher and eight students. The school was independently owned by the Sub-Normal Children's Welfare Association.

In November, 1961 the school moved to its current location in Browning Street, Bathurst where it was housed in a building built from both volunteered labour and fundraised money. A donation was made to the school by the NSW government, allowing it to open at its new premises completely debt free. The education department became involved at this time, providing a teacher and equipment for one group of students and subsidising the other.

In February, 1971 the school was purchased from the Sub-Normal Children's Welfate Association by the state education department.

In 1980, the school was greatly expanded with the construction of new classrooms and the name was changed from Glenray to Carenne.

=== Student sex affair ===
In 2010, it was found by the NSW District Court that a teacher at the school, Anna Blackburn was involved in a sexual relationship with Withyman, a 17-year-old student of the school. Withyman sued the state of New South Wales and the teacher. Staff at the school denied having knowledge of the affair and the education department claimed the affair caused Withyman no further harm than his disability. Judge Elkaim held that prior incidents established that Blackburn needed to be protected from Withyman's behaviour and that her conduct in taking Withyman home and having sex with him was so unexpected "as to be not reasonably foreseeable either as an act itself or as a risk of it occurring". Blackburn's actions were outside the scope of her employment such that the school was not vicariously liable. Withyman's appeal to the NSW Court of Appeal was unsuccessful.

== See also ==
- List of Government schools in New South Wales
