= Albury High School =

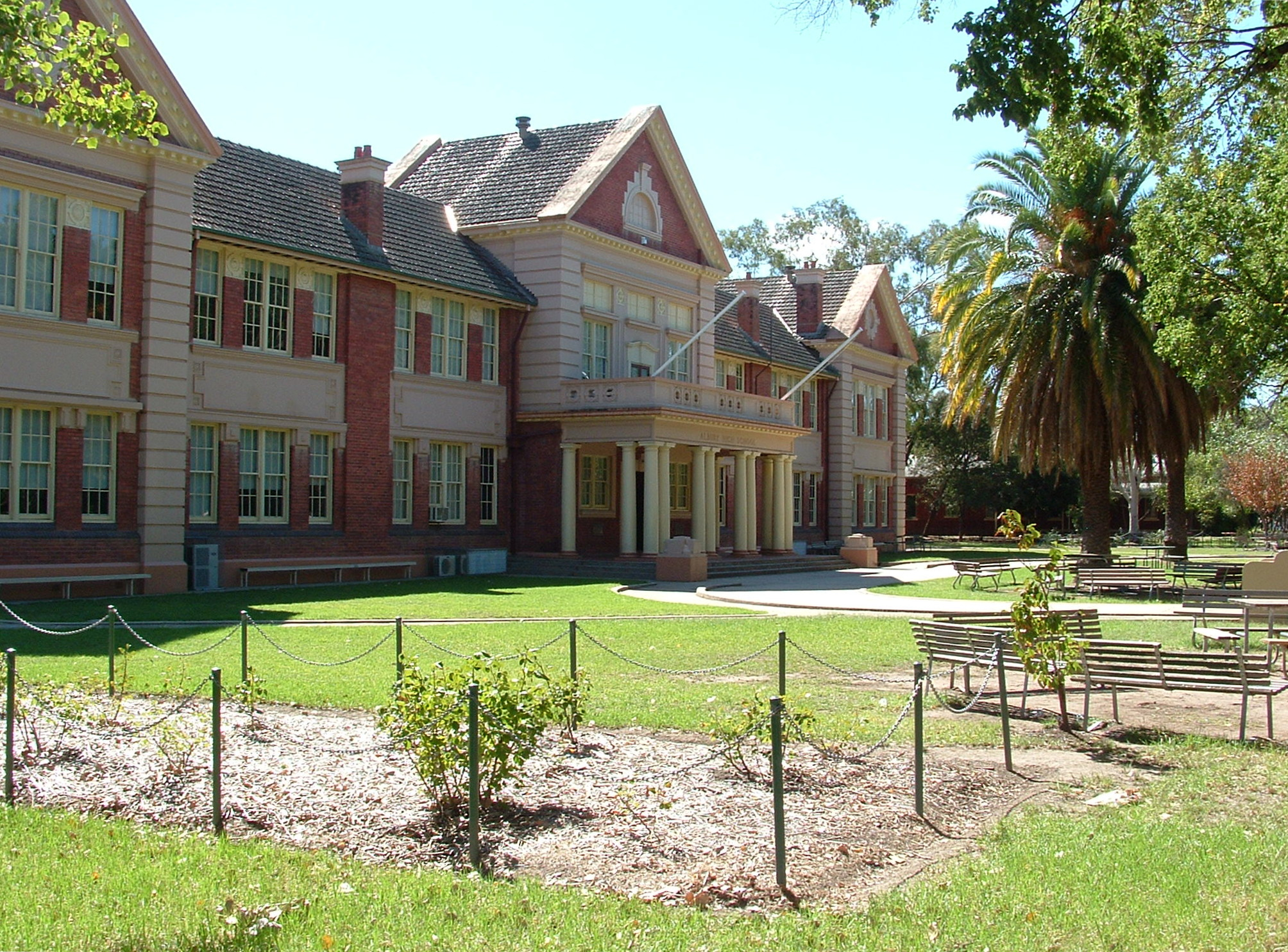
- Albury High School, pictured in 2007

Location
- Kiewa Street, Albury, New South Wales; Australia; 36°04′22″S 146°54′57″E

Information
- Type: Public Comprehensive secondary school
- Motto: Latin: Ad Astra Per Aspera (To the stars through difficult and challenging ways)
- Established: 1920; 106 years ago
- School district: Albury; Rural South and West
- Educational authority: NSW Department of Education
- Principal: Damian Toohey
- Teaching staff: 68.2 FTE (2025)
- Years: 7–12
- Enrolment: 910 (2025)
- Colours: Red; Black; White
- Yearbook: Southern Cross
- Website: albury-h.schools.nsw.gov.au

Albury High School is a government-funded co-educational comprehensive secondary day school located in Albury, a city in the Riverina region of New South Wales, Australia.

Established in 1920, the school enrolled 910 students in 2025, from Year 7 to Year 12, of whom seven percent identified as Indigenous Australians and twelve percent were from a language background other than English. The school is operated by the NSW Department of Education; the principal is Damian Toohey.

== History ==
Albury High School was established in 1920 and occupied an old hospital building in Thurgoona Street, Albury. Under the guidance of the first headmaster, J. G. Monaghan, the school quickly grew and gained more than 200 pupils. This significantly dropped in the mid-1920s, however after the establishment of a parents and citizens association that was treated as a separate body, the school began to grow once more. The school moved into its current location in Kiewa Street on 28 March 1928, after the building of a permanent site to the tune of $50,000. The enrolment at the class slowly grew, with only a minor hitch when the school was classified as a Third Class High School. Eventually, the school gained its classification as a First Class High School and the numbers continued to grow. The addition of further buildings in the 1970s as well as the decision to include the Principal's residence as a teaching space helped aid the increasing enrolment.

In 2014, a fire destroyed the administration office.

== Notable alumni ==
- Anne Boyd AM – composer and academic; professor of music at the University of Sydney
- Jacob Koschitzke – Australian Rules Footballer
- Max Lynch – Australian Rules Footballer
- Anthony Miles – Australian Rules Footballer
- Gab Pound – AFLW player
- Richard Roxburgh – actor
- Paul Spargo – Australian Rules Footballer
- Sienna Toohey – swimmer
- Percy Trezise – Australian pilot, painter, explorer and writer
- Jocelyn Bartram – Olympian, Field Hockey goalkeeper

== See also ==
- List of government schools in New South Wales (A-B)
- List of schools in the Riverina
- Education in Australia
