= Gab Pound =

Australian rules footballer

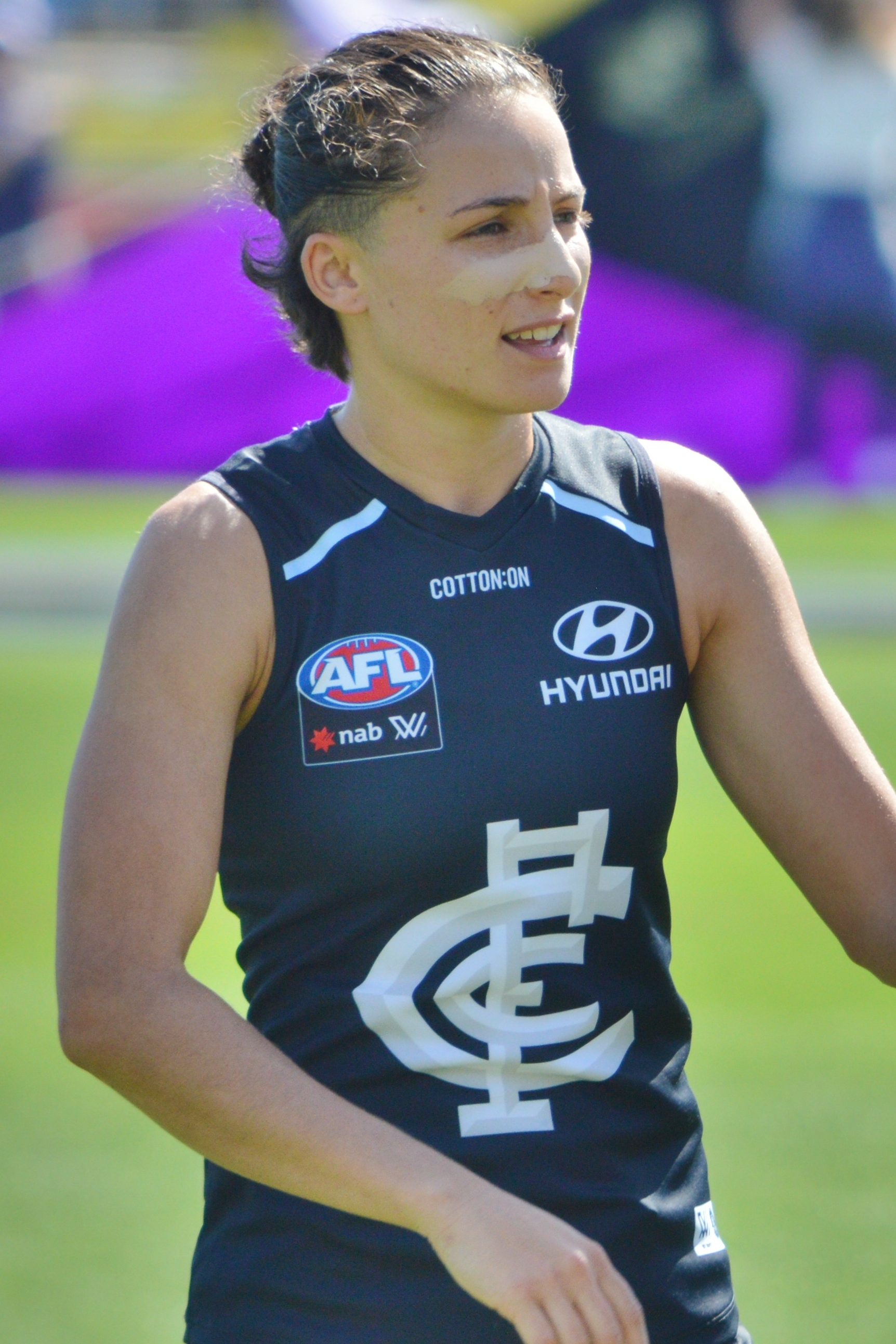
- Pound playing for Carlton in 2019

Personal information
- Full name: Gabriella Pound
- Born: 16 October 1994 (age 32)
- Original team: Melbourne University (VFLW)
- Draft: No. 30, 2016 AFL Women's draft
- Debut: Round 1, 2017, Carlton vs. Collingwood, at Ikon Park
- Height: 166 cm (5 ft 5 in)
- Position: Forward

Club information
- Current club: Carlton
- Number: 6

Playing career^{1}
Years	Club	Games (Goals)
2017–	Carlton	78 (6)
- ^{1} Playing statistics correct to the end of the 2021 season.

Gabriella Pound (born 16 October 1994) is an Australian rules footballer playing for the Carlton Football Club in the AFL Women's competition (AFLW). She was drafted by Carlton with the club's fourth selection and the thirtieth overall in the 2016 AFL Women's draft.

== Early life ==
Pound was raised in Albury, New South Wales. She was introduced to the sport through Auskick in Albury and continued playing the sport at school. Pound attended Albury High School. When she heard about the AFLW, she sought to play in the AFLW and drove two hours to Wagga Wagga to play in the women's Under 17s. To pursue her dream she later moved to Melbourne to join the Melbourne University (VFL Women's) team.

Playing with the Albury High School team, she was put into the backline in a school game being played at the Lavington Sports Ground. This was because her skills and experience were vital for countering the other school's dominance in that game. Each time the opposition scored a point, Gabriella had to kick out from the full back square. Each time she kicked out with a torpedo punt kick, colloquially known as a "barrel" or "torpy." The 40m-plus kicks became a feature for the crowd, who began yelling for the opposition to kick more points!

== AFLW ==
She made her debut in Round 1, 2017, in the club and the league's inaugural match at Ikon Park against Collingwood. In this game, she kicked the first ever torpedo in AFLW in the opening quarter.

A consistent 2019 season as a running half back flanker with clean disposal, saw Gabriella awarded the honour of a place in The All Australian Team. She signed a 2-year contract with Carlton on 10 June 2021, after it was revealed the team had conducted a mass re-signing of 13 players. Pound is of Sri Lankan descent through her father.

Her loyalty to the Carlton Football Club was (and has been evident ever since) when she politely denied the opportunity to transfer to North Melbourne when they entered the AFLW competition in 2019. Having played with the kangaroos 'feeder' club, Melbourne University (VFL Women's), she and other 'mugger' players were invited to rejoin as a group with this new club in the AFLW. Notable (former Melbourne University) acquisitions for North Melbourne in their inaugural year were Gabriella's former team mates Emma Kearney and Kaitlyn Ashmore.

== Statistics ==
Statistics are correct to the end of the 2024 season

Legend
G	Goals	K	Kicks	D	Disposals	T	Tackles
B	Behinds	H	Handballs	M	Marks

Gab Pound AFLW statistics
Season	Team	No.	Games	Totals							Averages (per game)							Votes
Season	Team	No.	Games	G	B	K	H	D	M	T	G	B	K	H	D	M	T	Votes
2017	Carlton	6	7	1	0	34	13	47	18	32	0.1	0.0	4.9	1.9	6.7	0.9	2.6	-
2018	Carlton	6	7	0	0	42	13	55	7	13	0.0	0.0	6.0	1.9	7.9	1.0	1.9	-
2019	Carlton	6	9	1	11	76	28	104	29	16	0.1	0.1	8.4	3.1	11.6	3.2	1.8	-
2020	Carlton	6	7	0	0	67	20	87	21	11	0.0	0.0	8.4	2.9	12.4	3.0	1.6	-
2021	Carlton	6	7	1	0	71	22	93	12	14	0.1	0.0	10.1	3.1	13.3	1.7	2.0	-
2022	Carlton	6	8	0	0	95	37	132	22	21	0.0	0.0	10.1	4.6	16.5	2.8	2.6	
2022	Carlton	6	8	3	3	59	21	80	13	26	0.4	0.4	7.4	2.6	10.0	1.6	3.2	
2023	Carlton	6	9	0	0	102	45	147	22	27	0.0	0.0	11.3	5.0	16.3	2.4	3.0	
2024	Carlton	6	11	0	0	111	31	142	18	32	0.0	0.0	10.1	2.8	12.9	1.6	2.9	
Career			73	6	4	657	230	887	150	178	0.1	0.1	9.0	3.2	12.2	2.1	2.4	
