= Arthur Phillip High School =

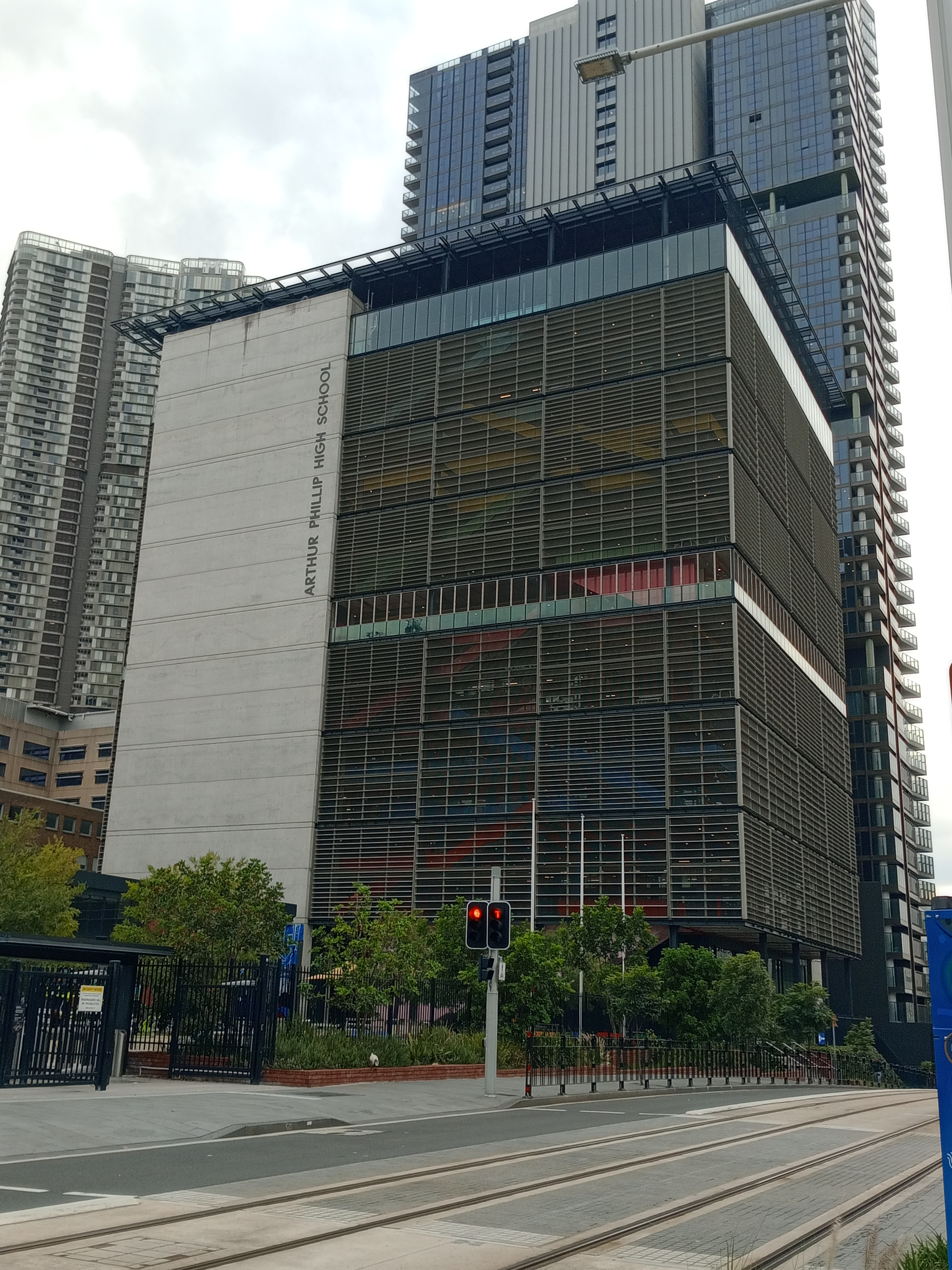
- The high rise building of Arthur Phillip High School, February 2026

Location
- Macquarie Street, Parramatta, Sydney, New South Wales; Australia; 33°48′59″S 151°0′24″E

Information
- Type: Public, coeducational secondary, day school
- Established: 1960; 66 years ago
- Enrollment: 1462 (2023)
- Campus type: Suburban
- Website: arthurphil-h.schools.nsw.gov.au

Arthur Phillip High School (abbreviated as APHS) is a coeducational public high school, located in Parramatta, New South Wales, Australia. The school was established in 1960 in its own right, in buildings which had been used continuously as a school since 1875, and is named for Arthur Phillip, the first governor of the state of New South Wales and the founder of the city of Sydney.

== History ==
Parramatta South Public School opened in 1873, and in 1875 moved to Smith Street. In 1887 it became a "Superior Public School" offering both primary and post-primary courses. In 1907 it was renamed Parramatta. For many years, boys' and girls' post-primary classes were taught separately in the adjacent buildings. In 1944, they were combined into a Central School. At the start of 1958, the primary school moved to Macquarie Street, where it remains today. In 1960, the secondary classes were separately established as Arthur Phillip High School. At the front of the main side of its two-part campus the Old School House building, now a museum, is situated and contains photos and items pertaining to education in Australia's early colonial era and beyond. The Old School House is the oldest continuously used educational building in Sydney.

In February 2015, a new high rise building was announced to be in production to accommodate for more classroom and students. In 2020, the new high rise building was completed with 11 levels and 6 mezzanine floors for other classrooms, each level having different facilities for class/elective subjects.

== Campus ==
The campus is located at the corner of Smith Street and Macquarie Street in Parramatta's central business district, on both sides of Macquarie Street. The main part of the school is on the north side of Macquarie Street, and hosts the 65 m tall tower building, where the classrooms, gym, and offices are located. Across the street, the majority of the old school building was knocked down to make way for an outdoor space which the school shares with neighbouring Parramatta Public School, while the oldest parts of the school building have been preserved as the Old School House, students go to give their final math exams.

Before the tower was finished, the architectural front and main entrance of the school faced Smith Street, however it was rarely used and was an artefact of a different structure which was changed due to the building's numerous appendages. The school had a central courtyard around which the main classroom buildings were arranged, and additional sports grounds which gradually decreased in size due to an increase in demountable classrooms.

== Social initiatives ==
Arthur Phillip High School has a Refugee Transition Program which engages with the wider migrant and refugee community in Western Sydney.

== Incidents and accidents ==
=== Terrorism event ===
In 2015, 15-year-old student of the school, Farhad Khalil Mohammad Jabar, was the perpetrator of the 2015 Parramatta shooting.

Another student was arrested after he encouraged terrorism after this shooting.

=== Student stabbing attack ===
On 23 November 2020, the school went to lockdown after a stabbing attack on a 14 year old male student, NSW Police was alerted at 8:30 am and searched around the area. However, no arrests were made after the investigation. Officers from Parramatta Police Area Command established a crime scene and investigated how the boy was stabbed. The boy suffered serious injuries after multiple stab wounds on his body and was taken to hospital soon after, however, classes were resumed after the incident unfolded.

== See also ==
- List of government schools in New South Wales (A-B)
- Education in Australia
