= Saint Joseph's College, Tweed Heads =

Saint Joseph's College

Location
- 2 Doyle Drive, Banora Point, Tweed Heads, Northern Rivers, New South Wales; Australia; 28°12′38″S 153°32′10″E

Information
- Type: Independent co-educational secondary day school
- Motto: Peace Through Justice
- Denomination: Roman Catholic
- Patron saint: Saint Joseph
- Established: 1993; 33 years ago
- Oversight: Roman Catholic Diocese of Lismore
- Principal: Ryan Campbell
- Enrolment: c. 750
- Campus type: Regional
- Colours: Grey, white and maroon
- Website: www.bpslism.catholic.edu.au

Saint Joseph's College (SJC) is an independent Roman Catholic co-educational secondary day school, located in Banora Point, near Tweed Heads, the Northern Rivers region of New South Wales, Australia. Founded in 1993, the college is administered by the Roman Catholic Diocese of Lismore and associated with the Parish of St Joseph, along with St Joseph's Primary School and St James' Primary School, the latter of which is situated on the same campus. The college first opened in 1993 alongside St James' Primary School, with 115 students.

Notable former pupils include comedian and actor Celeste Barber.

== See also ==
- List of schools in the Northern Rivers and Mid North Coast
- List of Catholic schools in New South Wales
- Catholic education in Australia
