= Chinderah, New South Wales =

Suburb of Tweed Shire, New South Wales, Australia

Chinderah
- Suburb
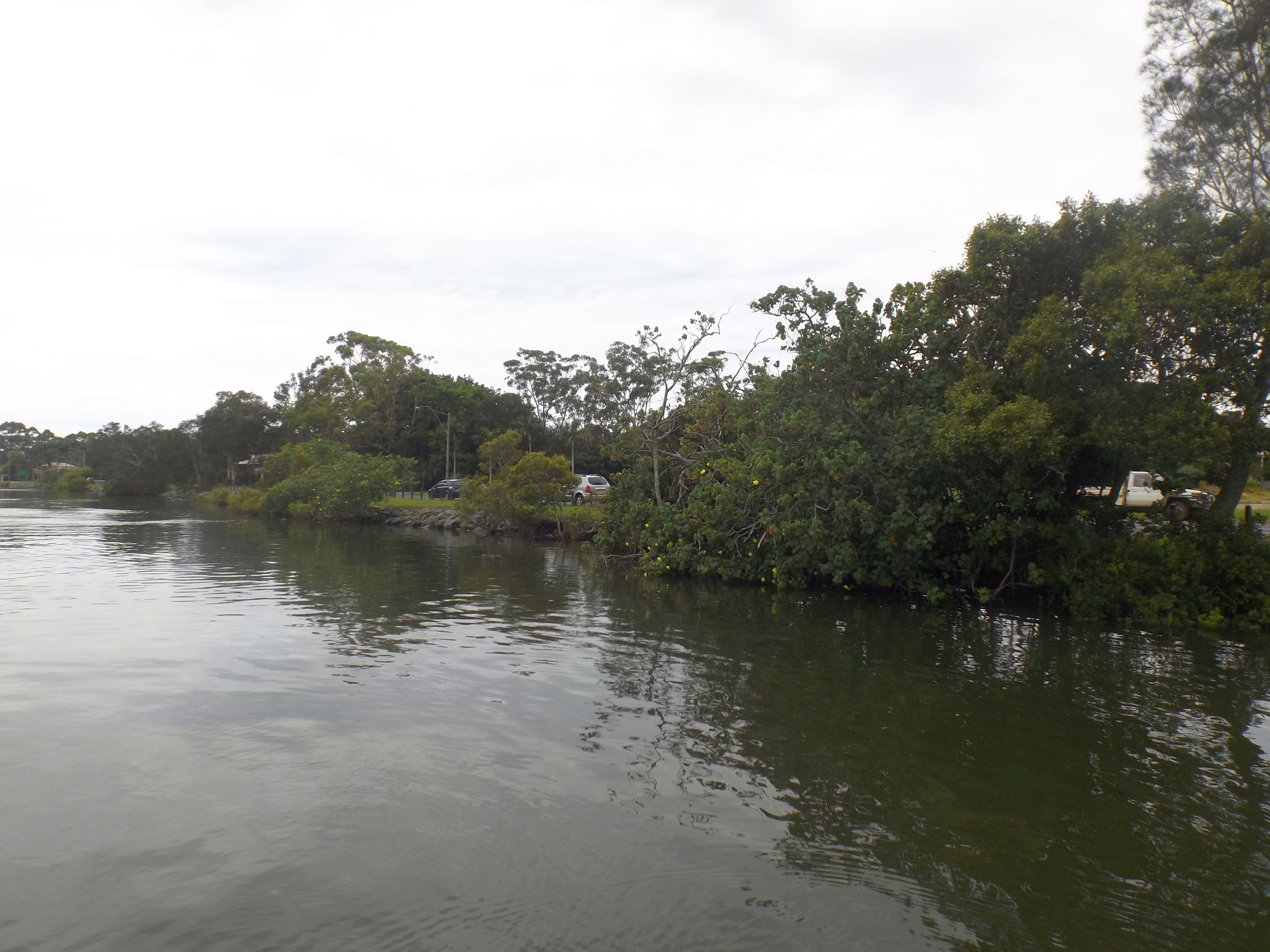
- Tweed River, 2017

- Interactive map of Chinderah
- Coordinates: 28°14′14″S 153°33′25″E
- Country: Australia
- State: New South Wales
- LGA: Tweed Shire

Government
  - State electorate: Tweed
  - Federal division: Richmond

Population
  - Total: 1,639 (2021 census)
- Postcode: 2487
Suburbs around Chinderah
Terranora	Banora Point	Final Head
North Tumbulgum	Chinderah	Kingscliff
Stotts Creek	Cudgen	Cudgen

Chinderah is a town in the Tweed Shire. It is located south of Tweed Heads and next to the seaside township of Kingscliff. An industrial estate, golf course and small shopping precinct are located within the area.

The Ngandowal and Minyungbal speaking people of the Bundjalung people are the traditional owners of the Tweed region, including Chinderah, and the surrounding areas.

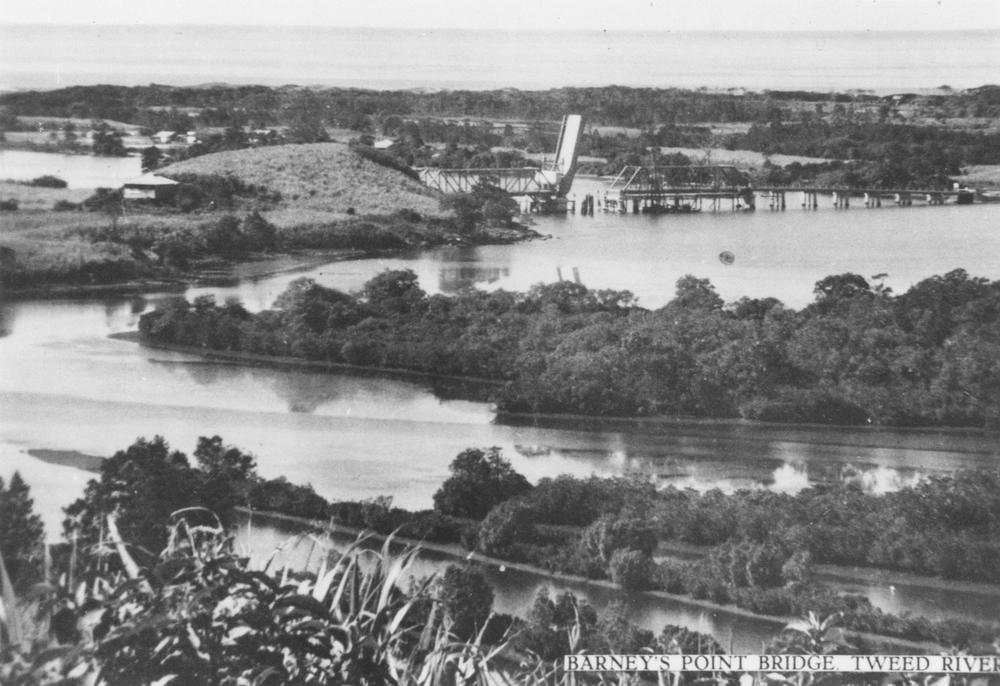
Barney's Point Bridge, circa 1940

== Demographics ==
In the 2021 Census, Chinderah recorded a population of 1,639, 48.9% female and 51.1% male. The median age of Chinderah residents was 62 years, 24 years above the national median. Aboriginal and Torres Strait Islander people made up 8.7% of the population. 74.8% of Chinderah residents were born in Australia and 90.1% of people spoke only English at home. The most common responses for religion were No Religion 36.6%, Anglican 20.1% and Catholic 20%.

In the 2016 Census, Chinderah recorded a population of 1,566, 47.9% female and 52.1% male. The median age of Chinderah residents was 60 years, 22 years above the national median. Aboriginal and Torres Strait Islander people made up 7.6% of the population. 75.4% of Chinderah residents were born in Australia and 91.5% of people spoke only English at home. The most common responses for religion were No Religion 25.9%, Anglican 23.3% and Catholic 22.8%.
