= Banora Point High School =

Location
- Eucalyptus Drive, Banora Point, Northern Rivers region of New South Wales; Australia; 28°12′57″S 153°31′32″E

Information
- Type: Government-funded co-educational comprehensive secondary day school
- Motto: Reach for the stars
- Established: 2004; 22 years ago
- School district: Tweed Coast; Regional North
- Educational authority: NSW Department of Education
- Principal: Christopher Randle
- Teaching staff: 49.5 FTE (2018)
- Years: 7–12
- Enrolment: ~600 (2018)
- Campus type: Regional
- Colours: Navy and yellow
- Website: banorapnt-h.schools.nsw.gov.au

Banora Point High School is a government-funded co-educational comprehensive secondary day school, located in Banora Point, a town in the Northern Rivers region of New South Wales, Australia.

Established in 2004, the school catered for approximately 600 students in 2018, from Year 7 to Year 12, of whom approximately 12 percent identified as Indigenous Australians and six percent were from a language background other than English. The school is operated by the NSW Department of Education; the principal is Christopher Randle.

== See also ==
- List of government schools in New South Wales: G–P
- List of schools in the Northern Rivers and Mid North Coast
- Education in Australia
