= Bunnaloo =

- Town
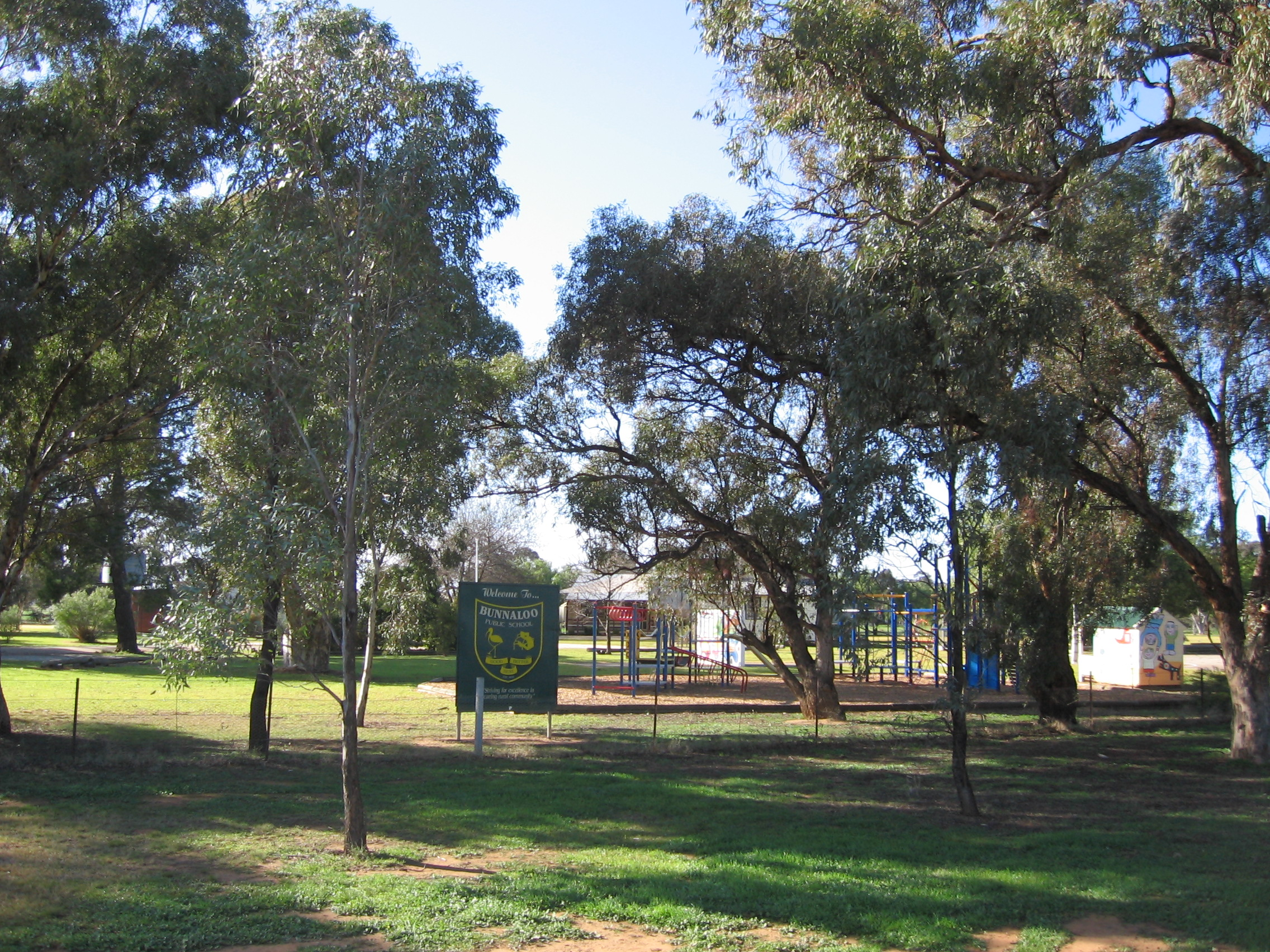
- Bunnaloo Public School

- Coordinates: 35°47′S 144°35′E
- Country: Australia
- State: New South Wales
- LGA: Murray River Council
- Location: 787 km (489 mi) from Sydney; 263 km (163 mi) from Albury; 37 km (23 mi) from Mathoura; 13 km (8.1 mi) from Tantonan

Government
  - State electorate: Murray
  - Federal division: Farrer

Population
  - Total: 101 (2016 census)
- Postcode: 2731
- County: Cadell

Bunnaloo is a village community in the central southern part of the Riverina and situated about 37 kilometres (23 mi) west of Mathoura and 45 kilometres (28 mi) south west of Deniliquin. In 2006, Bunnaloo had a population of 126.

== History ==
The area that is now known as Bunnaloo originally was split between two properties: the Cobram Station and Perricoota. In 1899, a crown lease on part of the Perricoota land expired and the New South Wales Government split a paddock into six 700 acre homestead farms to be sold in 1901. Further subdividing of the Cobram Estate land allowed for more residents to move to the area.

The first Post Office in Bunnaloo was run from the home of a Mrs Hawkins, replacing the weekly mail run from Mathoura by Syd Larcombe. In 1924 a new railway line was laid, with Bunnaloo homing a new station. This allowed for easy transport of wheat or stock (previously it had to be carted 18 miles to Mathoura).

In 1926, Victor Hicks built a store in Bunnaloo. The Post Office was moved here, becoming the first official Bunnaloo Post Office (until its closure in 1974).

== Education ==
In 1919 the parents of Bunnaloo purchased and moved a building from Womboota to a property to be used as a school. This was run by subsidised teachers prior to government teachers being supplied. For the school's final years it was again run by subsidised teachers. In 1927, the school was closed and the building sold to parents of the town of Walliston.

Bunnaloo Public School opened in 1928 and is still running (despite closing from 1944 to 1951 due to World War II). Currently, it has approx. 50 students attending. Students in Years K to 6 attend from all around the area. The current principal is Darren Devereux.

== Sport ==
Until its disbandment at the end of the 1989 season, the Bunnaloo Football Club operated for many years. It won back-to-back premierships in 1988 and 1989.

In the 1960s, the Bunnaloo Table Tennis Club was established and operated. Teams of four men and two women competed for the McHugh Holschier trophy.

Bunnaloo in conjunction with Mathoura fields a cricket team in the Goulburn Murray Cricket League known as the Northern United Cricket Club. Prior to this, the Bunnaloo Cricket Club operated from the Bunnaloo Recreation Reserve.

== Amenities ==
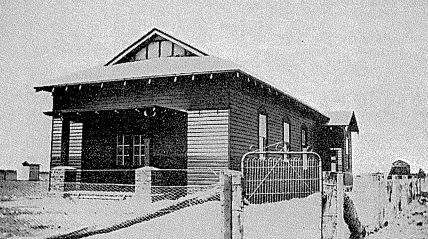
The first Bunnaloo Hall, built in 1927

The first Bunnaloo Hall was built in 1927 at a cost of £702. A supper room was added in 1945, and throughout the late 1950s and 1960s fundraisers were held to refurbish the hall. In the early 1980s, a new Bunnaloo Hall was built as part of the Bunnaloo Recreation Reserve. This includes an oval, cricket nets, and tennis courts.

The Bunnaloo Uniting Church (formerly the Bunnaloo Methodist Church) opened in 1966.

A petrol station still operates, currently known as Riverine Petroleum. It resides on the intersection of Fitzroy Street and Bunnaloo Road.

== Climate ==
Climate data for Bunnaloo
Month	Jan	Feb	Mar	Apr	May	Jun	Jul	Aug	Sep	Oct	Nov	Dec	Year
Average rainfall mm	32.7	26.4	29.1	24.5	27.6	40.3	32.3	28.2	34.2	21.8	40.1	35.9	333.8
Average rainfall inches	1.29	1.04	1.15	0.96	1.09	1.59	1.27	1.11	1.35	0.86	1.58	1.41	13.14
