= List of government schools in New South Wales (A) =

Prior to 1848, most schools in New South Wales were operated by churches or private organisations, with some financial support from the government under the Denominational School Board, which was established in 1836. In January 1848, the Board of National Education began establishing government schools to develop a public education system, with the enactment and royal assent (16 August 1848) of the National Education Board Act 1848 (NSW). The first public school, Kempsey National School, opened that year, and by 1851, more than 37 public schools were in operation in New South Wales. As of 2025, the New South Wales Department of Education, a department of the Government of New South Wales, administers more than 2,200 public schools, both primary and secondary schools, across that state, that are in these lists:

== A ==
Name	Suburb/Town	Region	Opened	Coordinates	Ref
Abbotsford Public School	Abbotsford	Inner West	1925	33°51′11.88″S 151°7′48.97″E	
Aberdeen Public School	Aberdeen	Upper Hunter	1864	32°9′57.18″S 150°53′20.74″E	
Abermain Public School	Abermain	Hunter	1905	32°48′35.33″S 151°25′34.32″E	
Adaminaby Public School	Adaminaby	Snowy Mountains	1869	35°59′36.07″S 148°46′36.14″E	
Adamstown Public School	Adamstown	Hunter	1877	32°55′56.8″S 151°43′50.02″E	
Adelong Public School	Adelong	Snowy Mountains	1860	35°18′45.68″S 148°3′46.51″E	
Afterlee Public School	Kyogle	Northern Rivers	1919	28°34′54.7″S 152°49′5.41″E	
Airds High School	Campbelltown	Macarthur	1974	34°5′14.17″S 150°49′38.2″E	
Ajuga School	Glenfield	Macarthur	1992	33°58′7.99″S 150°52′42.74″E	
Albert Park Public School	Lismore	Northern Rivers	1942	28°49′15.34″S 153°16′23.23″E	
Albion Park High School	Albion Park	Illawarra	1991	34°34′33.86″S 150°46′22.46″E	
Albion Park Public School	Albion Park	Illawarra	1872	34°34′14.87″S 150°46′19.88″E	
Albion Park Rail Public School	Albion Park Rail	Illawarra	1959	34°34′4.91″S 150°47′54″E	
Albury High School	Albury	Riverina	1920	36°4′24.01″S 146°55′3.41″E	
Albury North Public School	Albury	Riverina	1927	36°3′52.96″S 146°55′53.69″E	
Albury Public School	Albury	Riverina	1850	36°4′56.57″S 146°55′9.73″E	
Albury West Public School	Albury	Riverina	1936	36°4′38.9″S 146°53′47.73″E	
Aldavilla Public School	Aldavilla	Mid North Coast	1871	31°3′19.21″S 152°47′14.07″E	
Alexandria Park Community School	Alexandria	Inner West	2001	33°54′5.34″S 151°11′48.91″E	
Alfords Point Public School	Alfords Point	Southern Sydney	1996	33°59′31.81″S 151°1′28.97″E	
Allambie Heights Public School	Allambie Heights	Northern Beaches	1959	33°45′55.99″S 151°14′58.22″E	
Alma Public School	Broken Hill	Far West	1889	31°58′57.19″S 141°27′46.09″E	
Alstonville High School	Alstonville	Northern Rivers	1986	28°50′23.63″S 153°26′2.6″E	
Alstonville Public School	Alstonville	Northern Rivers	1875	28°50′22.78″S 153°26′16.31″E	
Ambarvale High School	Rosemeadow	Macarthur	1984	34°6′3.29″S 150°48′4.93″E	
Ambarvale Public School	Ambarvale	Macarthur	1979	34°5′10.67″S 150°47′53.06″E	
Anna Bay Public School	Anna Bay	Hunter	1879	32°46′34.75″S 152°5′22.95″E	
Annandale North Public School	Annandale	Inner West	1907	33°52′41.33″S 151°10′19.09″E	
Annandale Public School	Annandale	Inner West	1886	33°53′8.4″S 151°10′8.5″E	
Annangrove Public School	Annangrove	Hills District	1895	33°40′7.82″S 150°57′7.9″E	
Anson Street School	Orange	Central West	1966	33°17′46.96″S 149°5′47.71″E	
Anzac Park Public School	Cammeray	Lower North Shore	2016	33°49′34.87″S 151°12′41.02″E	
Appin Public School	Appin	Macarthur	1868	34°11′54.65″S 150°47′16.9″E	
Arcadia Public School	Arcadia	Northern Sydney	1894	33°37′23.48″S 151°3′8.36″E	
Arcadia Vale Public School	Arcadia Vale	Hunter	1958	33°3′37.93″S 151°34′48.23″E	
Ardlethan Central School	Ardlethan	Riverina	1910	34°21′15.46″S 146°54′6.85″E	
Argenton Public School	Argenton	Hunter	1951	32°56′15.99″S 151°37′46.12″E	
Ariah Park Central School	Ariah Park	Riverina	1899	34°20′50.99″S 147°13′5.06″E	
Armidale City Public School	Armidale	Northern Tablelands	1861	30°31′10.81″S 151°39′51.71″E	
Armidale Secondary College	Armidale	Northern Tablelands	2019	30°31′11.26″S 151°39′7.91″E	
Arncliffe Public School	Arncliffe	St George	1861	33°56′26.64″S 151°8′50.22″E	
Arncliffe West Infants School	Arncliffe	St George	1912	33°55′52.51″S 151°8′41.09″E	
Arndell School	North Ryde	Northern Sydney	1959	33°48′15″S 151°07′33″E	
Arranounbai School	Frenchs Forest	Northern Sydney	2000	33°45′26.24″S 151°14′34.25″E	
Artarmon Public School	Artarmon	Lower North Shore	1910	33°48′40.37″S 151°11′11″E	
Arthur Phillip High School	Parramatta	Greater West	1958	33°48′55.81″S 151°0′28.43″E	
Ashbury Public School	Ashbury	Inner West	1924	33°53′56.27″S 151°7′9.91″E	
Ashcroft High School	Ashcroft	Western Sydney	1964	33°55′11.68″S 150°53′47.12″E	
Ashcroft Public School	Ashcroft	Western Sydney	1962	33°54′57.79″S 150°53′51.67″E	
Ashfield Boys High School	Ashfield	Inner West	1953	33°53′22.26″S 151°7′46.93″E	
Ashfield Public School	Ashfield	Inner West	1862	33°53′22.27″S 151°7′39.71″E	
Ashford Central School	Ashford	Northern Tablelands	1868	29°19′15.92″S 151°5′39.68″E	
Ashmont Public School	Wagga Wagga	Riverina	1966	35°7′28.26″S 147°19′57.67″E	
Asquith Boys High School	Asquith	Upper North Shore	1960	33°41′29.33″S 151°6′11.31″E	
Asquith High School	Asquith	Upper North Shore	1947	33°41′24.46″S 151°6′41.97″E	
Asquith Public School	Asquith	Upper North Shore	1930	33°41′10.05″S 151°6′44.42″E	
Athelstane Public School	Arncliffe	St George	1930	33°56′15.04″S 151°8′18.07″E	
Attunga Public School	Attunga	New England	1878	30°55′48.23″S 150°50′46.53″E	
Auburn Girls High School	Auburn	Western Sydney	1961	33°50′35.8″S 151°2′3.86″E	
Auburn North Public School	Auburn	Western Sydney	1891	33°50′27.85″S 151°2′18.92″E	
Auburn Public School	Auburn	Western Sydney	1886	33°51′16.43″S 151°1′54.29″E	
Auburn West Public School	Auburn	Western Sydney	1934	33°51′37.43″S 151°1′11.57″E	
Austinmer Public School	Austinmer	Illawarra	1866	34°18′20.63″S 150°56′4.84″E	
Austral Public School	Austral	Western Sydney	1893	33°56′1.74″S 150°48′44.54″E	
Australia Street Infants School	Newtown	Inner West	1889	33°53′44.26″S 151°10′40.2″E	
Avalon Public School	Avalon Beach	Northern Beaches	1950	33°38′21.19″S 151°19′38.12″E	
Avoca Beach Public School	Avoca Beach	Central Coast	1935	33°28′14.81″S 151°25′51.56″E	
Avoca Public School	Avoca	Southern Highlands	1872	34°36′49.37″S 150°28′55.7″E	
Awaba Public School	Awaba	Hunter	1891	33°0′37.21″S 151°32′17.69″E	
Awabakal Environmental Education Centre	Dudley	Hunter	1976	32°59′26.28″S 151°43′0.53″E	

== See also ==
Organisations

- Education in New South Wales
- New South Wales Education Standards Authority
- Australian Curriculum

Lists

- List of schools in New South Wales
- List of government schools in New South Wales
- List of non-government schools in New South Wales
- List of selective high schools in New South Wales
- List of Catholic schools in New South Wales
- List of Anglican schools in New South Wales
- List of Islamic schools in New South Wales
- Lists of schools in Australia
