= Banora Point =

Town in New South Wales, Australia

- Suburb
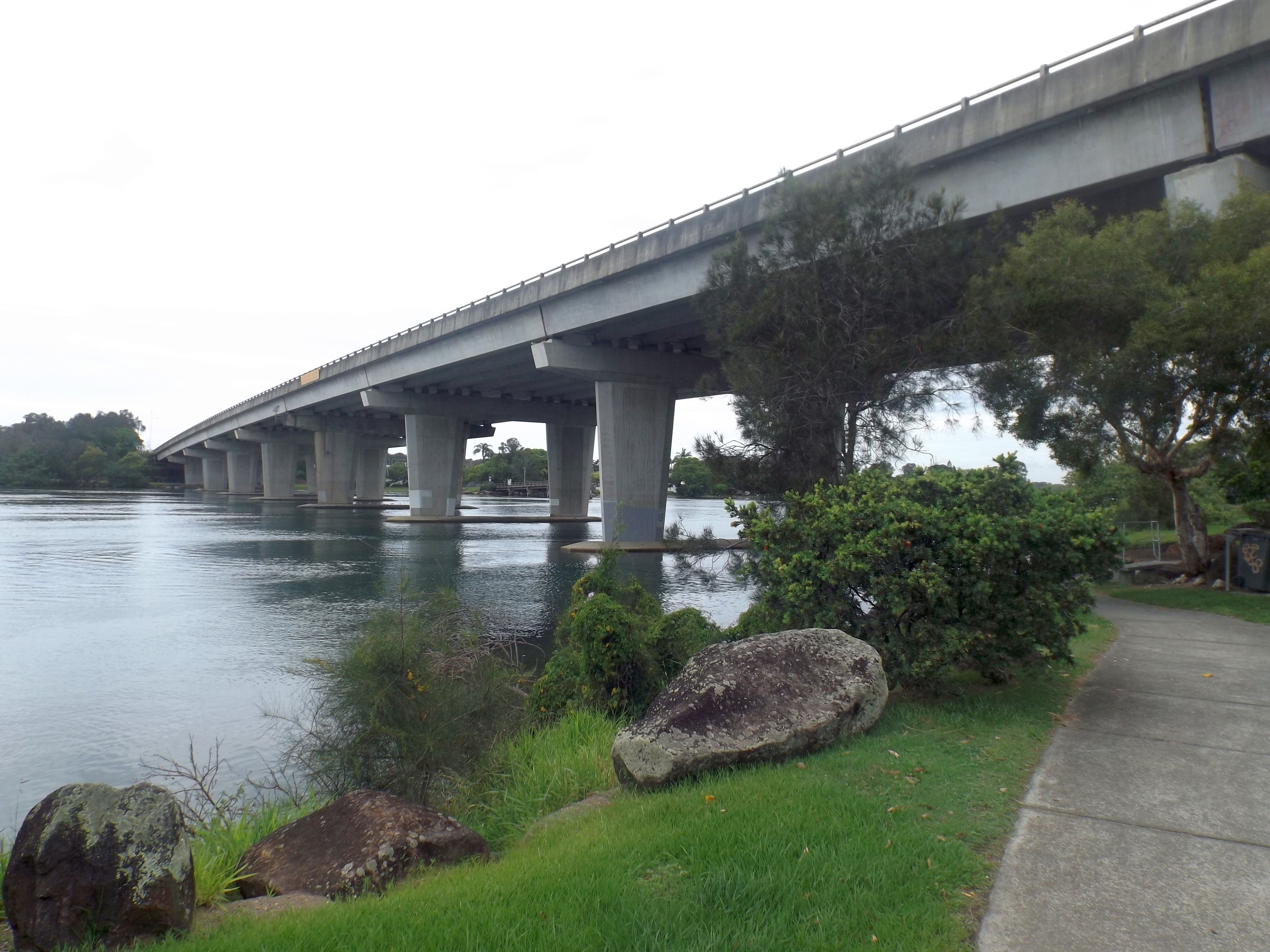
- Barneys Point Bridge over the Tweed River, 2017

- Interactive map of Banora Point
- Coordinates: 28°13′S 153°32′E
- Country: Australia
- State: New South Wales
- LGA: Tweed Shire

Government
  - State electorate: Tweed
  - Federal division: Richmond

Population
  - Total: 16,460 (SAL 2021)
- Postcode: 2486
Suburbs around Banora Point
Bilambil Heights	Tweed Heads South	Tweed Heads South
Bilambil Heights	Banora Point	Fingal Head
Terranora	Chinderah	Fingal Head

Banora Point is a suburb located in the Northern Rivers region of New South Wales, Australia in Tweed Shire. Together with Tweed Heads South and Terranora it had a combined population of 27,368 in 2001, including 21,457 (78.4%) Australian-born persons and 525 (1.9%) indigenous persons. In the 2016 census, Banora Point had a population of 16,167.

The eastern boundary is aligned with the Tweed River. There is a golf course in its centre and several islands along the river. The Pacific Motorway passes through the eastern parts. The town is largely suburban although it has also become a hub for small businesses with 3 local shopping villages. A number of schools, both public and Catholic, are also situated in the region. Demographically, families and retirees account for much of its growing population.

The Ngandowal and Minyungbal speaking people of the Bundjalung people are the traditional owners of the Tweed region, including Banora Point, and the surrounding areas.

Linguists, Geographical Names Board records, and local Indigenous knowledge indicate it is derived from the word banyar or banara, which translates to "good", "happy", "well", or "in good health".

== Education ==
- Banora Point Primary School
- Centaur Primary School
- St James Primary School
- Banora Point High School
- St Joseph's College

== Sport and recreation ==
Club Banora is an RSL club. It is part of the Twin Towns Clubs & Resorts and includes Club Banora Golf Club bowling greens, tennis courts and Snooker club. There are also many public parks and reserves located in Banora Point.
