= Bankstown Senior College =

Location
- Bankstown; New South Wales; Australia; 33.9311°S 151.0219°E

Information
- Type: Secondary
- Established: 1963
- Enrollment: 561 (2023)
- Website: https://bankstowns-h.schools.nsw.gov.au/

Bankstown Senior College, previously known as Bankstown Boys High School, is a coeducational senior college located in the suburb of Bankstown, in the City of Canterbury-Bankstown, New South Wales, Australia.

== History ==
The school was established in 1991, and in 2008 became the first school in Sydney to offer a 4-day school week.

== See also ==
- List of government schools in New South Wales
- Bankstown Girls High School
- Education in Australia
