= Bunnaloo Public School =

Location
- Riverina; Bunnaloo, New South Wales, 2731; Australia
- Coordinates: 35°47′06″S 144°35′48″E

Information
- Type: Public
- Motto: Good, Better, Best
- Denomination: Non denominational
- Established: 1928
- Status: Open
- Principal: Darren Devereux
- Years offered: K–6
- Gender: Co-educational
- Enrolment: 48 (2011)
- Classrooms: 5
- Campus type: Rural
- Colours: Yellow and green
- Slogan: Striving for excellence in a caring rural community
- Website: bunnaloo-p.schools.nsw.gov.au
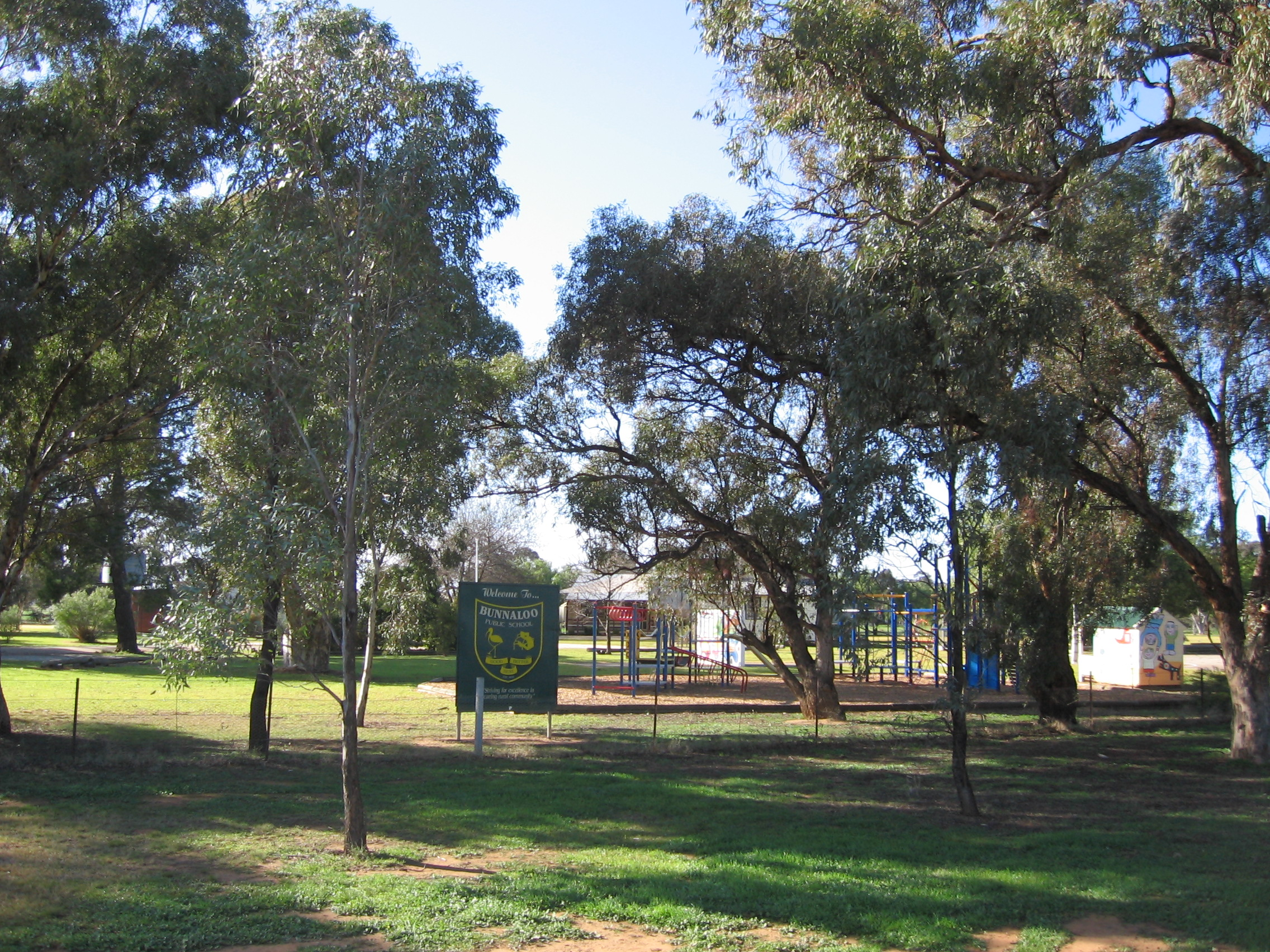
- Front of school in 2007

Bunnaloo Public School is a rural primary school that educates children from years Kindergarten to Year 6 from the Bunnaloo region of New South Wales. Founded in 1928, the school has five classrooms, an oval and a school residence. The principal is Darren Devereux, who came to the school in 1999.

== History ==
The school was established in response to requests from locals to the government for a new school in the area. Following the purchase of land, the first classroom was constructed in late 1927 by Echuca contractors Messrs. Symons & Co. The school opened in January 1928, with W Hester acting as the principal and single teacher of the 25 enrolled students. At this time, the school offered education to students from Years 1 to 8 (14 was the leaving age of school at the time).

In late 1944, the school was closed during the closing stages of World War II due to a luck of the number of students. The school was re-opened in 1951 by Barry Hubbard with borrowed supplies from the local Mathoura Public School. In 1957, the introduction of irrigation brought many people to the area which led to a high number of new enrolments. This led to the construction of a second classroom in 1962, splitting the school into a lower form (K–2) and an upper form (3–6). A staffroom that included a telephone was added in 1964. The school residence located South of the oval was built 1967, and a bus run operating to the North of the school was introduced the following year.

A third building was relocated to the school from the former Walliston School in 1976 after the enrolment number rose to 45 students (which would continue to grow to 63 the next year). Student number declined dramatically in 1987, which resulted in the school employing only one teacher. As enrolment numbers increased during the 1990s a new portable classroom was introduced in 1998, only to be replaced by a portable building that included a classroom, office, staffroom and principals office in 2001 (the building has previously been used to house athletes at the 2000 Sydney Olympic Games). This was the fourth building at the school, which included internet access.

A government grant allowed for the construction of a new classroom in 2010, to be used as a new library for the school. The completion of this building in late 2010 allowed it to be used as a Year 5/6 classroom from 2011 onward.

In 2013, the school's senior relay team competed as representatives for the Riverina District and placed 3rd at Sydney's Homebush Athletics Centre. In 2016, the school residence was demolished, leaving only the brick shed for school use.

== Principals ==
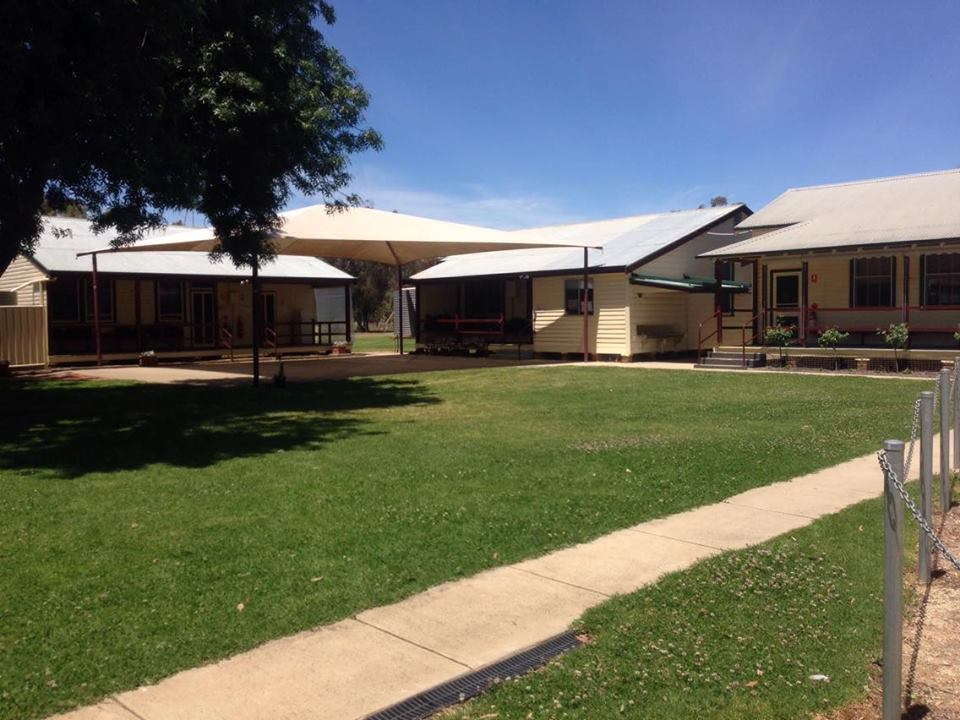
3/4, K/1/2, and Art Room (2016)

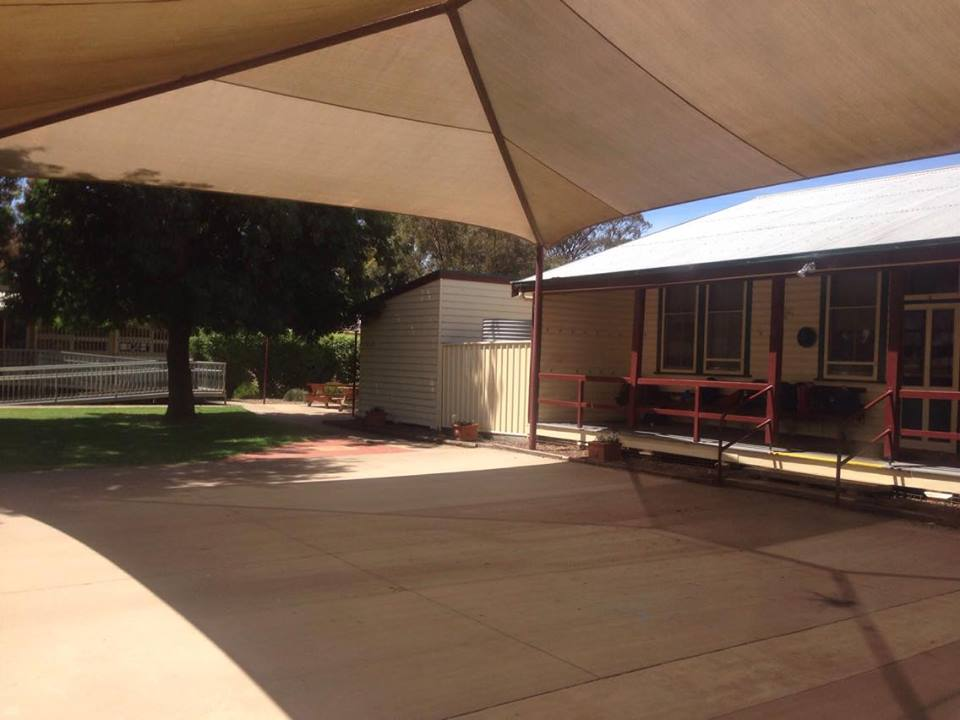
Portable Library and Office Building, Weather Shed, and 3/4 Classroom (2016)

Period	Principal
1928–1932	W Hester
1933–1934	A Harivel
1935–1937	R Bell
1938–1941	W Simpson
1942–1944	J Armstrong
1951–1954	B Hubbard
1955–1958	D Morrison
1959–1960	I Jackson
1961	H Brown
1962	G Stanley
1963	C Bishop
1964–1966	B Conville
1967–1969	K Honess
1970–1974	R Jackson
1975–1977	L Hogg
1978–1981	J Nye
1982–1985	J Hill
1986–1989	S Puckeridge
1990–1991	J Miller
1992–1998	I Reeves
1999–present	D Devereux

== See also ==
- List of schools in New South Wales
- List of Government schools in New South Wales: A–F
