= List of government schools in New South Wales =

Prior to 1848, most schools in New South Wales were operated by churches or private organisations, with some financial support from the government under the Denominational School Board, which was established in 1836. In January 1848, the Board of National Education began establishing government schools to develop a public education system, with the enactment and royal assent (16 August 1848) of the National Education Board Act 1848 (NSW). The first public school, Kempsey National School, opened that year, and by 1851, more than 37 public schools were in operation in New South Wales. As of 2025, the New South Wales Department of Education, a department of the Government of New South Wales, administers more than 2,200 public schools, both primary and secondary schools, across that state, that are in these lists:

- List of government schools in New South Wales (A)
- List of government schools in New South Wales (B)
- List of government schools in New South Wales (C)
- List of government schools in New South Wales (D–F)
- List of government schools in New South Wales (G–P)
- List of government schools in New South Wales (Q–S)
- List of government schools in New South Wales (T–Z)

== See also ==
- Lists of schools in Australia
