= Department of Education (New South Wales) =

Department of the Government of New South Wales

New South Wales Department of Education
- New South Wales Department of Education logo

Government Department overview
- Formed: 1 July 2015 (Current); 1880; 146 years ago (First incarnation)
- Preceding agencies: New South Wales Department of Education and Communities (2011–2015); New South Wales Department of Education and Training (1997–2011)
- Jurisdiction: New South Wales
- Headquarters: 105 Phillip Street, Parramatta, Sydney, New South Wales, Australia
- Ministers responsible: The Hon. Prue Car MP, Minister for Education and Early Learning; The Hon. Steve Whan MP, Minister for Skills and Training
- Government Department executive: Murat Dizdar, Secretary
- Key document: Education Act, 1990 (NSW)
- Website: education.nsw.gov.au

The New South Wales Department of Education, a department of the Government of New South Wales, is responsible for the delivery and co-ordination of early childhood, primary school, secondary school, vocational education, adult, migrant and higher education in the state of New South Wales, Australia.

The department was preceded by the Board of National Education and Council of Education, and has been formerly known by a number of names, including Department of Public Instruction, the Department of Education and Training (DET) between December 1997 and April 2011, and the Department of Education and Communities (DEC) between April 2011 and July 2015.

The department's powers are principally drawn from the Education Act, 1990 (NSW).

== History ==
In 1889 the NSW Government took control of the Board of Technical Education, which was then governed by the Technical Education Branch of the Department of Public Instruction. After technical education developed into a state-wide TAFE NSW network of colleges, eventually a separate Department of Technical Education was established in 1949.

In 1957 a committee was appointed to survey secondary education in New South Wales to survey and report on the provision of full-time education for adolescents. The resulting report was known as the Wyndham Report.

in 1974, the Australian Capital Territory Schools Authority took over responsibility for nearly 60 government schools that were previously under the control of New South Wales.

The Department of Education and Training (DET) was created in December 1997, until being renamed in April 2011 as the Department of Education and Communities (DEC) until July 2015.

== Structure and governance ==
The department's powers are principally drawn from the Education Act, 1990 (NSW).

The head of the department is its secretary, as of June 2023 Murat Dizdar.

The secretary reports to the Minister for Education and Early Learning, currently The Hon. Prue Car MP. Ultimately the ministers are responsible to the Parliament of New South Wales.

With a budget of more than A$8 billion, and over 2,240 schools with a total enrolment of almost one million students, the department represents roughly one-quarter of the State's total budget each year.

=== Departmental leadership ===
Name	Title	Term start	Term end	Time in office	Notes
William Wills	Secretary of the Board of National Education	12 February 1849	October 1863	14 years, 261 days	
William Wilkins	Secretary of the Board of National Education	October 1863	December 1866	21 years, 12 days	
William Wilkins	Secretary of the Council of Education	January 1867	30 April 1880	21 years, 12 days	
William Wilkins	Under-Secretary of the Department of Public Instruction	1 May 1880	12 November 1884	21 years, 12 days	
Edwin Johnson	Under-Secretary of the Department of Public Instruction	13 November 1884	10 April 1894	9 years, 148 days	
John Maynard	Under-Secretary of the Department of Public Instruction	10 April 1894	1 October 1903	9 years, 174 days	
Frederick Bridges (acting)	Under-Secretary of the Department of Public Instruction	1 October 1903	7 February 1905	1 year, 129 days	
Peter Board	Director of Education	8 February 1905	31 December 1922	17 years, 326 days	
Stephen Henry Smith	Director of Education	1 January 1923	1 August 1930	7 years, 212 days	
G(eorge) Ross Thomas	Director of Education	2 August 1930	21 September 1940	10 years, 50 days	
John Gordon McKenzie	Director of Education	22 September 1940	29 November 1952	12 years, 68 days	
Sir Harold Wyndham	Director-General of Education	1 December 1952	31 December 1968	16 years, 30 days	
David Verco	Director-General of Education	1 January 1969	3 July 1972	3 years, 184 days	
John Buggie	Director-General of Education	4 July 1972	18 February 1977	4 years, 229 days	
Douglas Swan	Director-General of Education	21 February 1977	8 July 1985	8 years, 137 days	
Robert Winder	Director-General of Education	10 July 1985	29 April 1988	2 years, 294 days	
Fenton Sharpe	Director-General of School Education	30 April 1988	12 November 1991	3 years, 196 days	
Ken Boston	Director-General of Education and Training; Managing Director of TAFE NSW	2 January 1992	12 July 2002	10 years, 191 days	
Jan McLelland	Director-General of Education and Training; Managing Director of TAFE NSW	22 October 2002	22 January 2004	1 year, 92 days	
Andrew Cappie-Wood	Director-General of Education and Training; Managing Director of TAFE NSW	22 January 2004	14 April 2007	3 years, 82 days	
Michael Coutts-Trotter	Director-General of Education and Training; Managing Director of TAFE NSW	14 April 2007	28 March 2011	3 years, 348 days	
Michele Bruniges	Director-General of Education and Training; Managing Director of TAFE NSW	7 September 2011	3 February 2014	4 years, 207 days	
Michele Bruniges	Director-General of Education and Communities; Managing Director of TAFE NSW	3 February 2014	1 July 2015	4 years, 207 days	
Michele Bruniges	Secretary of the Department of Education	1 July 2015	1 April 2016	4 years, 207 days	
Mark Scott	Secretary of the Department of Education	1 September 2016	23 April 2021		
Georgina Harrisson	Secretary of the Department of Education	24 May 2021	14 April 2023	1 year, 325 days	
Murat Dizdar	Secretary of the Department of Education	15 April 2023	incumbent	3 years, 208 days	

== Agencies administered ==
- List of government schools in New South Wales
  - List of government schools in New South Wales (A)
  - List of government schools in New South Wales (B)
  - List of government schools in New South Wales (C)
  - List of government schools in New South Wales (D–F)
  - List of government schools in New South Wales (G–P)
  - List of government schools in New South Wales (Q–S)
  - List of government schools in New South Wales (T–Z)
- TAFE NSW

== See also ==
- Department of Education Building
- Department of Education
