= Bilambil Heights =

Town in New South Wales, Australia

- Town
- Coordinates: 28.214°S 153.485°E
- Country: Australia
- State: New South Wales
- LGA: Tweed Shire
- Location: 106 km (66 mi) SSE of Brisbane; 832 km (517 mi) N of Sydney

Government
  - State electorate: Tweed
  - Federal division: Richmond
- Elevation: 1 m (3.3 ft)

Population
  - Total: 3,491 (2021 census)
- Time zone: UTC+10 (AEST)
  - Summer (DST): UTC+11 (AEDT)
- Postcode: 2486

Bilambil Heights is a town in north-eastern New South Wales, Australia, in the Tweed Shire.

The Ngandowal and Minyungbal speaking people of the Bundjalung people are the traditional owners of the Tweed region, including Bilambil Heights, and the surrounding areas.

== Demographics ==
In the 2021 Census, Bilambil Heights recorded a population of 3,491 people, 51.9% female and 48.1% male.

The median age of the Bilambil Heights population was 44 years, 6 years above the national median of 38.

78.7% of people living in Bilambil Heights were born in Australia. The other top responses for country of birth were England 4.3%, New Zealand 3.5%, Germany 1.0%, Scotland 0.5%, and South Africa 0.5%.

88.0% of people spoke only English at home; the next most common languages were 0.6% German, 0.6% Portuguese, 0.4% Italian, 0.3% Spanish, and 0.3% Greek.
