= Wingham Memorial Town Hall =

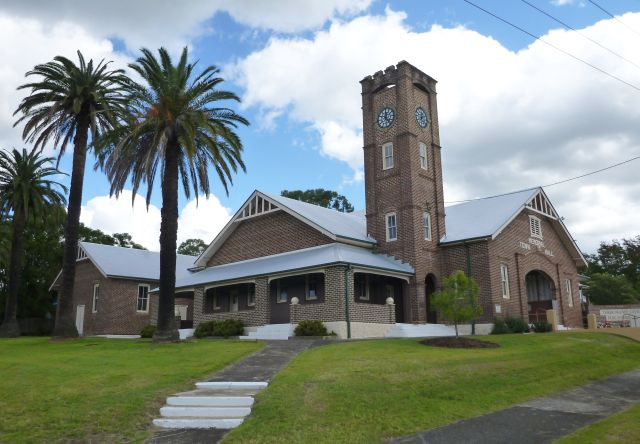
- Wingham Memorial Town Hall, viewed from corner of Farquhar and Queen Streets

- Location within New South Wales Location within Australia
- 31.8698°S 152.3686°E
- Location: 52 Farquhar Street, Wingham, Mid-Coast Council, New South Wales, Australia

History
- Built: 1922–1924

Site notes
- Architect: James T. Chambers
- Owner: Mid-Coast Council

New South Wales Heritage Register
- Official name: Wingham Memorial Town Hall; Wingham Town Hall; Wingham Council Chambers
- Type: state heritage (built)
- Designated: 8 April 2016
- Reference no.: 1967
- Type: Hall Town Hall
- Category: Community Facilities

Wingham Memorial Town Hall is a heritage-listed town hall at 52 Farquhar Street, Wingham, Mid-Coast Council, New South Wales, Australia. It was designed by James T. Chambers and built from 1922 to 1924. It is also known as Wingham Town Hall and Wingham Council Chambers. The property is owned by Mid-Coast Council. It was added to the New South Wales State Heritage Register on 8 April 2016.

== History ==
Aboriginal land

At the time of European settlement the Manning Valley was peopled by the Biripi people, who occupied the greater part of the Manning Valley, extending north from Blackhead to the Hastings Valley and the Worimi tribe, who occupied the area from Blackhead south to the Hunter River and west to near Barrington Tops. It is understood that Aboriginal people have been caring for this land for at least 20,000 years.

Indigenous lifestyles here would have been typical of coastal eastern Australia. Coastal lakes, beaches and estuaries backed by wooded country of various kinds provided rich and varied source of food and supported a high population. John Oxley wrote in 1829:

'The natives are extremely numerous along this part of the coast; these extensive lakes, which abound with fish, being extremely favourable to their easy subsistence; large troops of them appear at the beaches while their canoes on the lakes area equally numerous. In the mornings their fires are to be observed in every direction; they evidently appear to shun us, and we wish for no further acquaintance'

Population numbers decreased rapidly with European colonisation. Contact with cedar cutters in the early nineteenth century would have intruded harshly into the Aboriginal way of life. The depletion of Aboriginal food sources resulted in hostilities. Massacres of indigenous people and the poisoning of their food and waterholes was widespread throughout much of Australia during the nineteenth century. European diseases also took a heavy toll. By the late nineteenth century the traditional way of life was dislodged and many Aboriginal people were dependent on white employment or gathered into missions, which were in operation at Purfleet, Forster and Karuah during the late nineteenth and early twentieth centuries.

Despite this history of displacement Aboriginal soldiers from the district participated in both world wars and the latter enlistments are commemorated in the Honour Rolls at the Wingham Memorial Town Hall. Given the attitudes prevailing at the time and legislative proscription, Aboriginal men who sought to enlist in World War I often presented at recruiting offices far from their place of residence where their ethnicity was not known, so they could be accepted simply as someone "of dark complexion". Perhaps because of this, the World War I indigenous servicemen of the Wingham area are not known to be included on the Honour Rolls as they did not enlist locally. However, by the time of World War II, attitudes had changed and local Aboriginal servicemen are included on the Rolls.

Colonisation

The first European explorer to cross the Manning River was John Oxley who first visited the area in 1818. In 1829 the Manning River defined the northern boundary of the vast area of land from Newcastle to Taree which had been granted to the Australian Agricultural Company and the northern limit of settlement in the colony of NSW. Cedar cutters moved into the area around this time. The first official land grant of 1037 hectares was made to William Wynter who settled in the district in 1831. The modern township of Taree stands on this land. It was Wynter who gave his family home the name Tarree and subsequently named a schooner "Tarree". The schooner was used for shipping cedar to Sydney and ports to the south of Taree.

Wingham was chosen as a location for the government settlement as it was the furthest inland navigable place on the Manning River. Named after Wingham in Kent, England, it was proclaimed a village in 1844 but allotments were not made until 1854, the same year that Henry Flett laid out Taree as a private settlement. In the meantime, Tinonee had also been established as a government settlement and in 1866 had a population of 100, compared to 90 at Wingham and 150 at Taree. By 1909, Wingham had 285 houses and a population of 900, while Taree 269 houses and a population of 1300.

Wingham was proclaimed a municipality in 1889. In 1981 the municipalities of Wingham and Taree were merged with each other and the greater part of Manning Shire to form the City of Greater Taree. Part of Manning Shire Council was also incorporated into Great Lakes Council. On 12 May 2016, the City of Greater Taree was amalgamated into Mid-Coast Council, together with Great Lakes Council and Gloucester Shire.

War service in the Manning valley

Australians served overseas in several British Empire wars during the nineteenth century including the Boxer Rebellion, the Sudan War and the Boer War. However it was Australia's experience of World War I between 1914 and 1918 which most profoundly affected Australian identity and self-image. Like most of Australia, a large proportion of Manning Valley's young men signed up to fight for King and Empire following the declaration of war on 4 August 1914. Newspaper editorials and readers' contributions in the form of letters and poems called the Manning's young men to support the cause, parades were held, patriotic associations formed and fund-raising appeals were received enthusiastically. The "North Coasters", or "Boomerangs" as they were sometimes called, were given a civic welcome when they passed through the Manning Valley in February 1916 on their way from Grafton to Maitland.

A large proportion of these young men who went off to fight in Europe and the Middle East never came home, and of those who returned an even larger proportion were seriously injured in mind and / or body. As the Australian War Memorial website explains: 'For Australia, as for many nations, the First World War remains the most costly conflict in terms of deaths and casualties. From a population of fewer than five million, 416,809 men enlisted, of which over 60,000 were killed and 156,000 wounded, gassed, or taken prisoner.'

Following World War I war memorials were erected throughout Australia as an expression of grief for those lost and gratitude to those who served. These memorials were not a short lived emotion but an enduring expression of respect which remain prominent throughout the Australian built environment. Some memorials took years to eventuate as communities organised themselves, raised funds and debated what to build. Community halls were a popular form of memorial and communities would often rally to build a school of arts building as a memorial while some with existing halls frequently added commemorative plaques bearing a roll of honour. In the Manning Valley the Wingham Memorial Town Hall was opened in 1923 and the Taree War Memorial in 1925.

Wingham Memorial Town Hall

This lot of land in Wingham had been dedicated as a "Hall Site" in 14 November 1884, even before the municipality was declared in 1889. However the land lay fallow for many years.

The community of Wingham initiated the idea of building a memorial hall during World War I and made significant contributions to the original fund raising. The money raised was then passed on to the Returned Soldiers, Soldiers' and Airmen's Imperial League (RSSL) to administer further fund raising activities and develop the plan. In order to finalise the project and ensure its long-term future, it was proposed that the memorial hall be combined with the function of town hall and municipal offices. Wingham Municipal Council took over the project and obtained an additional loan of 4,000 pounds so that the hall would also accommodate municipal offices and council chambers

Mr S. H. Brewer was appointed the foreman of works alongside the architect, James Thomson Chambers, and builder, F. C. Sweeney. Mr Dudgeon, a monumental mason from Taree, supplied the foundation stone free of charge. The Honour Rolls were executed by monumental mason, A. Siddall. In a self-published architectural history about her father's career, Heather Chambers discussed the construction of the Wingham Memorial Town Hall:

'Chambers used local product wherever possible. The first question raised in the erecting of the building was how to procure suitable clay for the making of bricks. This in fact was done locally, and the bricks were made of clay from a local quarry on Cedar Party Creek. These bricks were made by A. Tufrey at the rate of £27s 6d per 1,000. The water to the hall for the building project was provided by four 1,000 gallon tanks, the water to be drawn from the roof of the adjoining Presbyterian Church. Gravel from the Manning River at Wingham was used in the cement for the foundations, and the mortar used in the brickwork was coloured by the sand also obtained from the nearby river. The timber for both the exterior and interior of the building was procured from the local sawmills at Comboyne and Killabakh, of black butt and white mahogany, and Chambers donated £25 worth of timber from his mill for the building of the hall. The use of local product and tradesmen were hallmarks of the Arts and Crafts movement.'

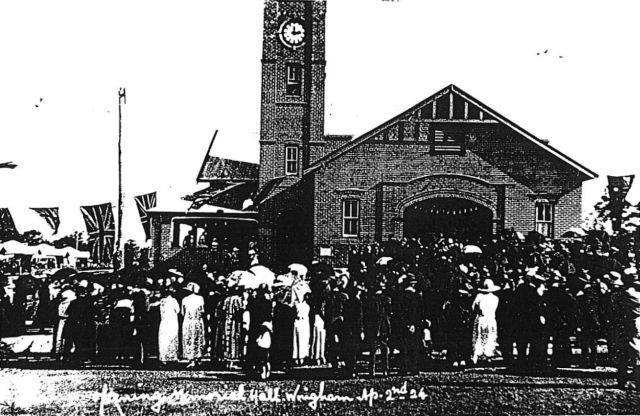
Opening day celebrations, 2 April 1924

The foundation stone was dedicated by Charles Rosenthal (1975-1954), a popular major-general who had commanded soldiers through most of the World War I theatres of war (and was wounded four times), also an architect, musician and NSW politician; he may have been a part-model for the authoritarian ex-soldiers' leader Benjamin Cooley in D. H. Lawrence's novel, Kangaroo. The Wingham Memorial Town Hall was officially opened on 2 April 1924. The Mayor's speech described the memorial hall as a monument and talked about how the history of a country is written in its monuments. He also stated that the hall, although owned by the Council, was the soldiers' hall and would be available for free use by any soldier for their direct benefit of any dependent of the fallen. The honour rolls, located in the vestibule of the hall, were also unveiled on that day. Anzac Day memorial services for the district continue to be held here and a new low-rise memorial wall was constructed 2011 near the entrance vestibule to contribute to this civic function.

Following the opening, a garden plan was submitted and a brick fence constructed around the Queen and Farquhar Street boundaries. Also at this time a clock was paid for by the ladies of Wingham and subsequently mounted in the clock tower.

Wingham Council had its offices in the building and held its Council meetings here until 1981, when the Municipality of Wingham was amalgamated with Taree Municipality and part of the Manning Shire and the building ceased to be used for many civic functions. The new Council, Greater Taree City Council, continued to use the offices at the Town Hall until c. 1985.

The Wingham Memorial Town Hall also has played an important role as a community hall and meeting place, having been in frequent use for large social and cultural gatherings such as dances, wedding receptions, meetings and even funerals. In past years community halls functioned in broader educational and cultural roles than today, often serving as literary institutes and schools of arts before the introduction of council-administered libraries or when travel to the main centres was time-consuming or difficult.

The Wingham Memorial Town Hall was also in use as a cinema from 1924 until 1939 and again from 1948 until 1955. It was licensed for this by Gerald Allport in 1924. The first Wingham "talkie" movie was screened here on 23 August 1930. It does not retain any of its projection equipment. An oral history drawing on the recollections of elderly residents of the Manning Valley in 1988 reported this account by local resident Stella Butterworth of the running of the cinema in the Wingham memorial TownHall in the 1930s:

'We had what they called a sound on disc in those days. The records had to synchronise with the film. If you happened to get a faulty record the needle would stick. I can remember on one occasion we had a film and it got to the words, 'I'll have to be going', and the needle stuck there. There was the hero kissing the girl and saying, 'I'll have to be going, I'll have to be going'. The audience was in stitches.
'One shilling and sixpence was the price to go in the theatre during the depression. We had two screenings, Wednesday and Saturday. We eventually had to give up the Wednesday screening. In the first twelve months we lost about two thousand pounds. We showed in the town hall for seven years. By 1937, we had sound on film.
' "Gone with the Wind" was offered to us for 90 to 10. Ninety percent for them and we had to do all the advertising. The big films were sold by percentage. The westerns were the cheapest and most popular. On a big night we'd have 400 people. It would average out at about 200.'

A study of the Wingham Memorial Town Hall by student Vanessa Penfold proposed that the use of the California Bungalow architectural style was part of the emergent Australian nationalism of the early twentieth century:

'Vanessa Penfold, in her Wingham Memorial Town Hall Study suggests, "Australian Architects were designing their own interpretation of a style now called the Californian Bungalow", which stylistically allowed an original Australian architecture to emerge. Penfold says that the "striking features representative in Chambers work in Wingham include the low pitched roofs, prominent gables and overhanging eaves and barges" (1993, p17) of the Californian Bungalow style... his designs had a much more decorative character in this period in Wingham, from 1918, as he was designing with his own flair and style and working within the Arts and Crafts idiom. He also followed the new fashionable trends of "simple forms, open verandahs, wood structures and shingle surfaces", and as an architect of the Scottish tradition, he brought his own influences from the International School to his work. Chambers was very much influenced by the important changes in architecture in Sydney at the time he was working there, as Australian design was evolving towards its own and original architecture.'

The then Mayor of Greater Taree City Council, Mick Tuck, stated in his speech for the 75th Anniversary Celebrations for Wingham Town Hall in 1999 that "This Hall will forever be, the centre, the heart, of Wingham".

James Thomson Chambers, architect (1870-1854)

James Chambers, though little documented, has been described by the National Trust of Australia (NSW) as "an important Sydney architect". He was born in Scotland and trained as an architect there, first settling in Roseville in 1910. His father had owned a timber milling business in Scotland and James evidently came to Wingham to run the sawmill business he had bought in 1917 in nearby Killabakh. Settling his family in Wingham in 1918, he designed them a fine home (also in the Interwar California Bungalow style at 4 Machins Parade Wingham) and carried out other architectural commissions in the area including the Rectory for St Matthew's Church of England, extensive renovations to the Wingham Hotel (sadly destroyed by fire in 2010), additions and alterations to Maitland Stores in Bent Street Wingham, a War Memorial at Killabakh and several substantial homes in Wingham. In 1921 he became a foundation director of the Wingham Land and Building Co. Ltd with several Wingham councillors, which constructed four more modest houses in Dingo Street (now Queen Street). However it appears that none of these businesses took off and he returned with his family to Sydney in 1925. After relocating to the Orange district for some years, he retired in Sydney where he died in Gladesville in 1954.

Comparisons

There are currently seven town halls listed on the SHR in NSW: Sydney Town Hall (1869), Paddington Town Hall (1891), Granville (1988), Maitland (1880s), Marrickville Town Hall (1879), Newcastle City Hall (1929) and Mudgee (1880). Of these, only the Newcastle City Hall dates from the twentieth century like the Wingham Town Hall. The Wingham Town Hall also differs from all those already listed because of its strong and representative associations with the commemoration of twentieth century wars. There are just two other known "memorial town halls" extant in NSW, both also built in the interwar period: Tamworth War Memorial Town Hall and Manilla Memorial Town Hall. Like Wingham they have lost their formal civic function and are in use as local community halls. The Tamworth War Memorial Town Hall is listed on the LEP.

There are hundreds of memorial halls dotted throughout NSW, of which more than 150 are listed on LEPs or on other heritage lists. Only one other memorial hall has so far been listed on the State Heritage Register: the Malachi Gilmore Memorial Hall in Oberon, an art Deco style building dating from 1937. The research suggests there is no other NSW town hall built in this "Interwar California Bungalow" style; Suters Architects Snell report of 16 May 1988 states that it is "probably stylistically unique in NSW".

== Description ==
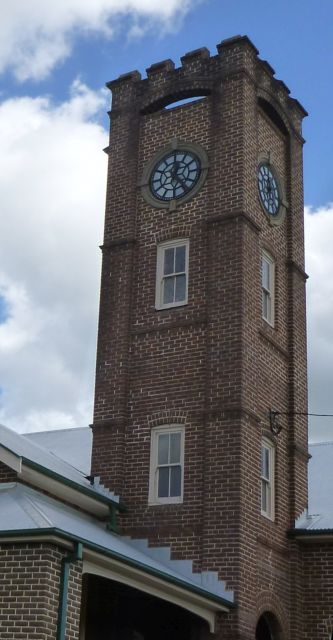
Detail of the clock tower

Wingham is an historic town located on the Manning River in the Mid North Coast region of NSW within the local government area of Greater Taree, 335 kilometres north of Sydney. Its population was 5313 in the 2011 census.

The Wingham Memorial Town Hall is located in a suburban area on the corner of Queen Street and Farquhar Street on a rise about midway between the town centre and its railway station. The building, dating from 1924, is a distinctive single storey brick building with corrugated iron roof, large gables, covered verandahs and castellated corner clock tower.

Designed by local architect James Thomson Chambers, it is rare and possibly unique within NSW as an institutional building designed in the Interwar Californian Bungalow architectural style. This style is characterised by its earthy appearance, brown brick work, low-pitched street-facing gables with decorative timber inserts, corrugated iron roof and substantial masonry piers on its verandahs. It also displays aspects of the Federation Free Style, characterised by the asymmetrically positioned landmark tower; and the Federation Arts and Crafts style, characterised by the large arch over the entrance and decorative painted wood work. Chambers' daughter's history of his career states: ':Much of Chambers' work espouses the philosophies used by the Federation Arts and Crafts Movement, which can be seen in his design of the Memorial Town Hall, with its asymmetric placement of the clock tower; its open vestibule area making it a place for the people; as well as the use of local product, tradesmen and artisans... The idea that the landscaping was part of the overall design of a building was favoured by the Arts and Crafts Movement... Buildings in the federation Arts and Craft style were... not merely facades, but rather were built "in-the-round", in artful informality.'

The gable to Farquhar Street covers an open spaced entrance vestibule and is entered through a wide brick segmental arch. The vestibule is panelled in wood and there are two segmental wooden arches to double doors that lead into the main hall. Between these doors there is an attractive semi-octagonal glazed ticket box with a timber moulded cornice and a row of little transom lights and each divided, by leadlight, into four panes.

The clock-tower stands about 15 metres high and has brick piers on each corner and a circular clock on each face. It is crenelated at the top.

The hall itself was eighty by forty feet (24 by 12 m) and seated 600 people; had an eighteen-foot (5.5 m) vestibule; the stage was forty by twenty feet (12.2 by 6.1 m) with three change rooms ten by ten feet (3.0 by 3.0 m); a supper room thirty-three by twenty-six feet (10.1 by 7.9 m) and a kitchen thirteen by ten feet (4.0 by 3.0 m); Council Chambers and a Town Clerk's room, both eighteen by eighteen feet (5.5 by 5.5 m); and two small rooms either side of the vestibule. The clock, costing 225 pounds, was donated through fundraising by the women of Wingham. The interior of the hall was decorated in pale cool finishes, to reflect the climate, the ceiling highlighted in darker paint work along the decorative lattice work.

By contrast, in 2015 the interior colours of the building are predominantly off-white.

Apart from the main hall, there is a supper room and service rooms together with the former civic office spaces, all with high ceilings (approximately 6m). The tower is accessible by ladder stairway. The four clock faces keep accurate time using recently installed electric mechanisms, installed by Ingrams Bright, an electronic master system. Each clock face has its own motor which runs off power. The original clock mechanism, replaced c. 1985, is on display in the Wingham Museum.

The Memorial Town Hall retains its intact World War I Honour Rolls displayed in the exterior foyer to the main hall. The Honour Rolls comprise a total of 1047 entries encompassing service in both wars and peacekeeping operations. The earliest entry relates to the Soudan (sic) War of 1885, the most recent to service in Iraq in 2003. Of these entries 232 are for service in World War 1 and a further 696 are for service in World War II. The insignia of the Royal Australian Air Force, the Australian Army and the Royal Australian Navy are displayed in the foyer, positioned above the main entry doors and ticket booth.

The original street fencing and entry gates have been removed. Good photographic records of these elements are available and the local community are investigating their reinstatement. The roof was replaced c. 2010 following hail damage.

Although the building's office spaces have been under-utilised since the town hall functions moved to Taree in the mid 1980s following local government amalgamations and the closure of the Wingham Shire offices, the various rooms of the building have since been in occasional community use by organisations such as the Baptist Church and Wingham Community Centre. The War Veterans' Remembrance Drive Association are due to assume occupancy of the office spaces in late 2015.

The SHR curtilage includes the main hall building, side driveway, mature phoenix palm trees and recently planted memorial rock gardens but excludes more recently constructed buildings in the rear of the lot including a shed used by the RSL and a childcare centre.

The hall was reported to be in good condition and fairly intact as at 1 June 2015.

=== Modifications and dates ===
- 1950s - ticket booth constructed in the vestibule
- 1969 (circa) - removal of brick fence around perimeter
- 1970 - verandah enclosed
- 1985 (circa) - Clock tower time keeping mechanism replaced with electronic system where each clock face runs off its own motor
- 1995 - toilets installed inside building
- 1999 - kitchen refurbished
- 2002 - refurbishment of the main hall
- 2003 - restoration of original form of the verandahs
- 2010 - Corrugated roof replaced following hail damage
- 2011 - installation of Cenotaph and Remembrance Wall near entrance foyer, dedicated 25 April 2011
- 2015 - office spaces repaired and repainted

== Heritage listing ==
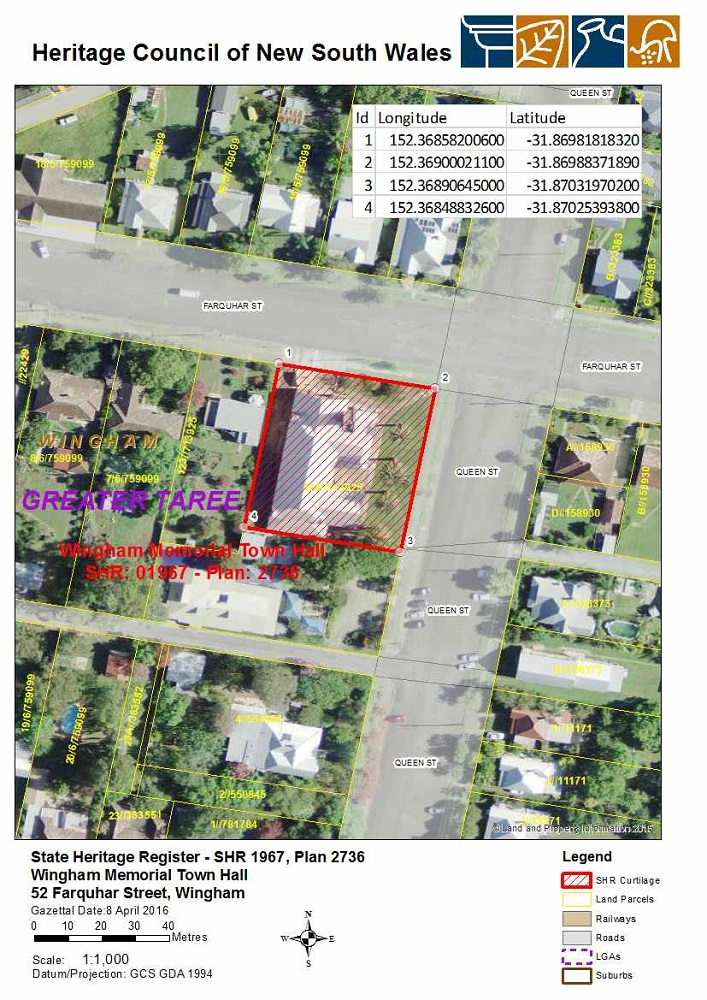
Heritage boundaries

The Wingham Memorial Town Hall is of state aesthetic significance for its architectural design as a landmark twentieth century civic building in the NSW Mid North Coast region. Designed in the Interwar California Bungalow style, which is usually reserved for residential design, the hall has been described as "architecturally unique". It is also rare as a memorial town hall in NSW. It is of state representative significance as a high quality, regional town hall building and for its memorial function designed to permanently commemorate the local men who lost their lives in World War I. Its status as a war memorial epitomises the importance of "remembrance" in Australian culture. The hall is also of representative significance as a community hall used for social and cultural events that draw the community together.

Wingham Memorial Town Hall was listed on the New South Wales State Heritage Register on 8 April 2016 having satisfied the following criteria.

The place is important in demonstrating the course, or pattern, of cultural or natural history in New South Wales.

The Wingham Memorial Town Hall has local historical significance as the seat of local government prior to amalgamation in 1981.

The place is important in demonstrating aesthetic characteristics and/or a high degree of creative or technical achievement in New South Wales.

The Wingham Memorial Town Hall is of state aesthetic significance for its architectural design as a landmark twentieth century civic building in the NSW Mid North Coast region. Designed in the Interwar California Bungalow style, which is usually reserved for residential design, the hall has been described as "architecturally unique". The town hall is a strongly and confidently massed building with a dramatic entrance vestibule. Its asymmetrically placed clock tower and mature phoenix palm trees contribute to its strong streetscape presence.

The place possesses uncommon, rare or endangered aspects of the cultural or natural history of New South Wales.

The Wingham Memorial Town Hall is of state significance for its rarity as one of only three known memorial town halls in NSW (along with Tamworth and Manila memorial town halls). It is also rare as a civic building designed in the Interwar Californian Bungalow style.

The place is important in demonstrating the principal characteristics of a class of cultural or natural places/environments in New South Wales.

The Wingham Memorial Town Hall is of state representative significance as a high quality, regional town hall building and for its memorial function designed to permanently commemorate the local men who lost their lives in World War I. This commemoration function, extended over time to recognise men who died in later wars, demonstrates the high level of commitment by local communities in NSW to honouring the young men they lost to war. Its status as a war memorial epitomises the importance of "remembrance" in Australian culture. The hall is also of representative significance as a community hall used for social and cultural events that draw the community together, including its several decades functioning as the local cinema.
