= Ella Simon =

Australian Aboriginal activist

- Born: Cinderella Jane née Whitbread/ Russell; 1902; Taree, New South Wales
- Died: 13 February 1981 (aged 78–79); Taree, New South Wales
- Occupation: Aboriginal Activist/First Aboriginal Person in Australia to be a Justice of The Peace
- Spouses: Clement Ritchie (m. 1916; div. 1933); Joseph (Joe) Simon (m. 1934–1981)
- Parents: Samuel Whitbread (father); Lucy Ann Russell (mother)

Cinderella (Ella) Jane Simon (1902 – 13 February 1981), a Biripi woman, was an Australian Aboriginal activist.

== Early years and background ==
Simon was born in a tent on the edge of Taree to Lucy Ann Russell, a Biripi woman. Rusell died from typhoid in 1909. Simon's father is understood to be Samuel Whitbread, a saddler at Wingham. Whitbread Street in Taree is named after Samuel Whitbread's brother, Stephen Whitbread (1857-1937), who was the town clerk (1888-1933).

The main 'Aboriginal camp' at Taree at the time was at Brown's Hill Fringe Camp, now the site of Ruprecht Park, was located on the northern side of the Manning River, within Biripi Country. The camp was established in the 1850s by displaced Aboriginal people from the Biripi and Worimi nations. In May 1900, the location of the station at Purfleet was decided at a Sydney meeting of the Aboriginal Protection Board. This meeting established a government reserve (No. 89) of seven hectares (eighteen acres).

Simon's maternal grandfather was George Russell who was from the east coast and had an Aboriginal mother and Scottish father. Russell worked for local farmers and told the McClellans of the terrible conditions of Brown's Hill Camp. They were so sympathetic they offered him a little corner of their land. In 1902 Russell convinced several indigenous families to move from Brown's Hills camp to the land given by McClennan's. Russell helped build the first school in Purfleet in 1904 with 'Mr Belford from Glenthorne'.

Simon's maternal grandmother had the European name, Susan Russell. She also had the Aboriginal name, 'Kundaibark', which meant 'The wild apple tree', as she was born under a wild apple tree. She was from the Opossum clan of the Biripi nation; and her father was Irish. She was abandoned by her tribe as an infant after her mother died because of her lighter skin. She was found by stockmen and was brought up by station people. Simon's maternal grandmother returned to the Biripi nation when she became of age and raised Simon. In 1912, Simon's maternal grandfather died.

== Career ==
Simon attended school in Purfleet until aged 12 years. On 29 May 1916 at the Methodist parsonage, Taree, she married Clement Ritchie, a labourer.

Simon left for work in Sydney in the 1920s. She returned to Purfleet to look after her maternal grandmother; who died in 1932. The following year, Simon divorced from Clement Ritchie, on the grounds of adultery. On 30 April 1934 at the Court House, Taree, she married Joseph (Joe) Simon, a widower with four sons, who was a fine guitarist and singer. She had become an assertive and skilful spokesperson for her people with successive resident government managers, some of whom employed her as a domestic. During World War II she and Joseph grew vegetables at Avoca on contract for the army; he later worked as a professional fisherman. In 1945, they returned to Purfleet.

In 1957, Simon was granted a Certificate of Exemption. This certificate provided an exemption to an Aboriginal person from state laws relating to the control of Aborigines (for example the Aborigines Protection Act and Regulations).

Simon became the secretary of the newly formed United Aborigines Mission at Purfleet. In 1960 she formed an Aboriginal branch of the Country Women's Association's (CWA) on Purfleet reserve and became its president. Through her position as President of the Purfleet branch of the CWA, Simon gained the support of the President of the Taree Branch, Mrs Hickson, in confronting the Mission Manager about the need for stoves for Aboriginal houses. At the time, apart from the Manager's home and Simon's home, Aboriginal people in Purfleet would cook on an open fire, using a camp oven. In addition to stoves being placed into homes at Purfleet as a result of this confrontation with the Mission Manager by the CWA, bathrooms were added, a footpath was constructed, water and electricity were supplied and a pre-school was started.

On 27 April 1960, Simon opened the Gillawarra gift shop selling Aboriginal artefacts. The Shop Committee included the Mission Manager, Simon, two other Aborigines, four business men from Apex (including Allan Cowan an accountant and Max Carey, a chemist). In 1962, Simon became the first Aboriginal Justice of the Peace in Australia. In 1962 she was also named Lady of Distinction by Quota.

Between May and December 1973, Simon recorded her oral narrative. In one recording session she was alone, another time she was with a European Australian friend, Anne Ruprecht and another time she was with an Aboriginal friend. In 1978, Simon wrote an autobiography, Through My Eyes; further editions were published in 1987 and 1995.

Simon died in Taree in 1981.

== Relatives ==
Horry Saunders refers to Simon as a great influence in his life. Saunders' wife, Faith (nee Marr) was a cousin of Simon. Faith Saunders' father was Pastor Bert Marr. Horry Saunders used to play with Simon's son when he was a youth.

== Recognition ==
In December 1997, the dual-lane Pacific Highway Taree bypass opened and as a result, most of the traffic carried by the Martin Bridge became local traffic. The second carriageway was opened to traffic in April 2000 and became the southbound carriageway of the re-routed Pacific Highway. The Pacific Highway has two bridges that cross the Manning River. The southern bridge is named the Ella Simon Bridge in her honour. It crosses the southern entrance of the Manning River onto Dumaresq Island.

The Ella Simon Bridge at Pampoolah, named in honour of Ella Simon in recognition of her legacy.
