= Wingham Brush Nature Reserve =

Protected area in New South Wales, Australia

- IUCN category IV (habitat/species management area)
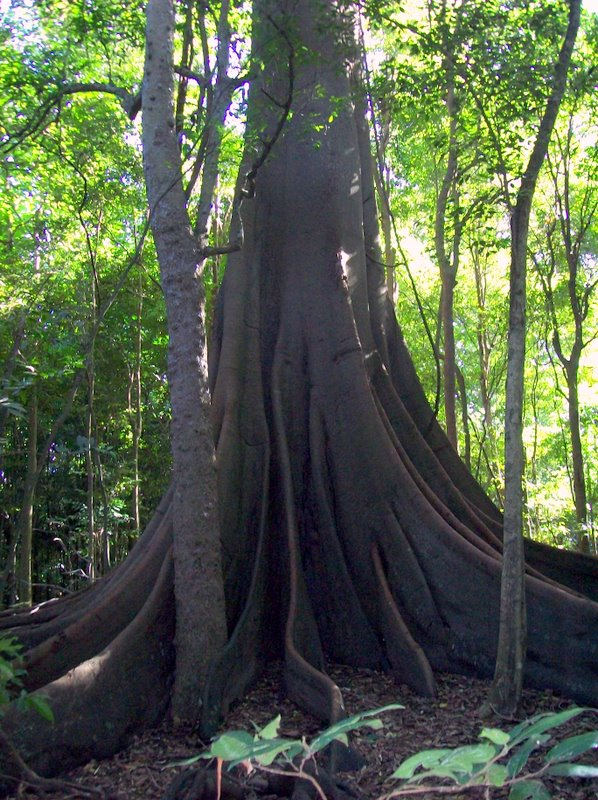
- Moreton Bay fig, located in the reserve

- Location within New South Wales
- Location: New South Wales
- Nearest city: Wingham
- Coordinates: 31°52.2′S 152°22.8′E
- Area: 0.08 km^{2} (0.031 sq mi)
- Established: July 2000
- Governing body: NSW National Parks and Wildlife Service
- Website: Official website

The Wingham Brush Nature Reserve is a protected nature reserve in the Mid North Coast region of New South Wales, in eastern Australia. The 8-hectare (20-acre) reserve is a rare example of sub tropical lowland rainforest and is situated on the Manning River.

== Features ==
Much of Australia's lowland sub tropical rainforest was cleared for housing and agriculture, leaving only small patches remaining, such as at Wingham Brush The soils are derived from the Manning River. These alluvial soils are enriched from basaltic deposits upstream at Barrington Tops and the Comboyne and Bulga Plateaux. The average annual rainfall is 1,100 millimetres (43 in) at Wingham.

=== Fauna ===
The most obvious mammal species in the rainforest is the grey-headed flying fox. Many other species of bats occur here too. Noteworthy birds occurring here include the osprey, green catbird, wompoo fruit-dove and brush turkey. Nocturnal gliders and possums occur in the rainforest, as do many species of reptiles, such as the land mullet.

=== Flora ===
The reserve contains 76 species of trees. Most evident in Wingham Brush are the large Moreton Bay figs. Another very common plant is the giant stinging tree. The largest known blush walnut was measured at 37 metres tall, with a base of over a metre wide. Other significant tree species include white cedar, black apple, white walnut, shiny-leaved stinging tree, native elm, hairy rosewood and black booyong.

==== Rainforest regeneration ====
Rainforest regeneration programmes have been put in place to encourage local rainforest species and suppress the problem of invasive weeds. The forest was badly infested with weeds until local residents decided to act in 1980. The vines Madeira vine and cats claw creeper were particularly damaging. After the cleanup, the previously degraded area was transformed back into pristine rainforest. The "Wingham Brush method" is an internationally recognised technique for rainforest regeneration.

== Indigenous Australians ==
Wingan in the local indigenous Biripi language means "where bats come to drink". Indigenous Australians regularly visited the rainforest for the collection of food, medicinal purposes, the collection of fibres for making bags and nets and social gatherings. The rainforest has spiritual significance to local indigenous people.

== Gallery ==
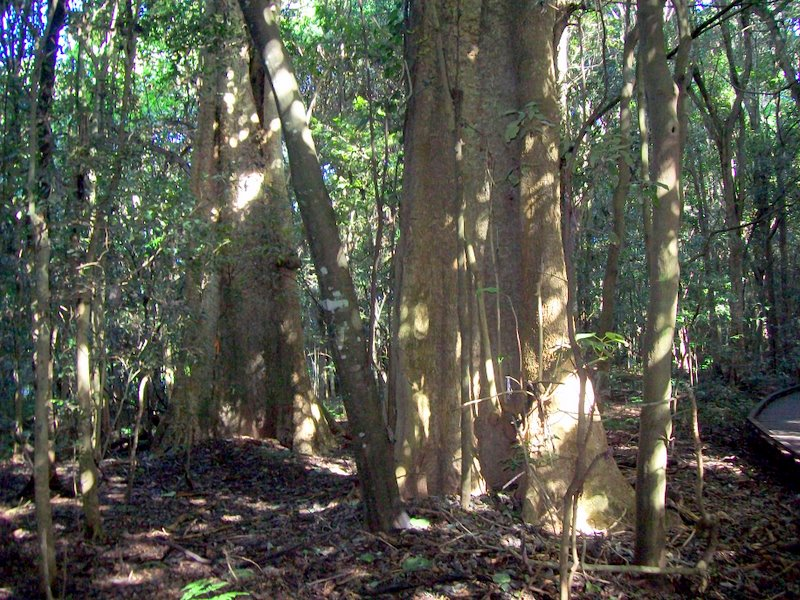
Giant stinging trees

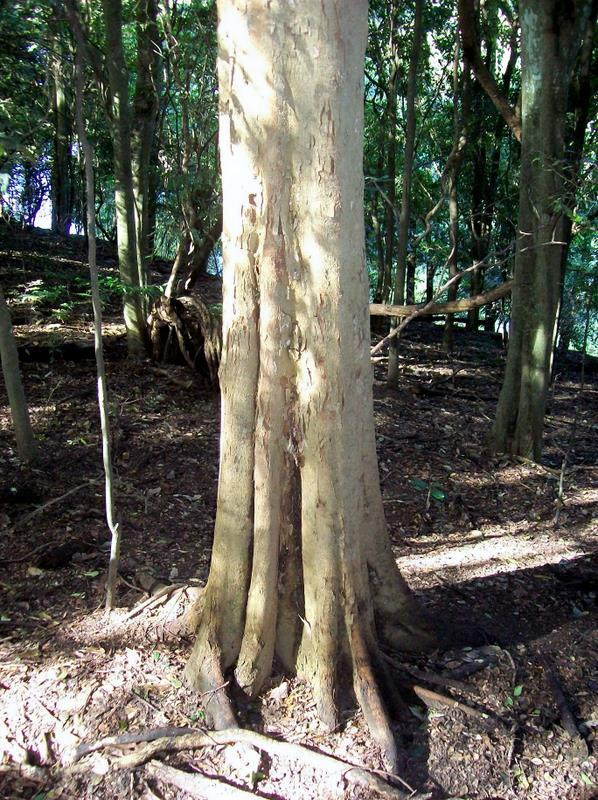
Native elm

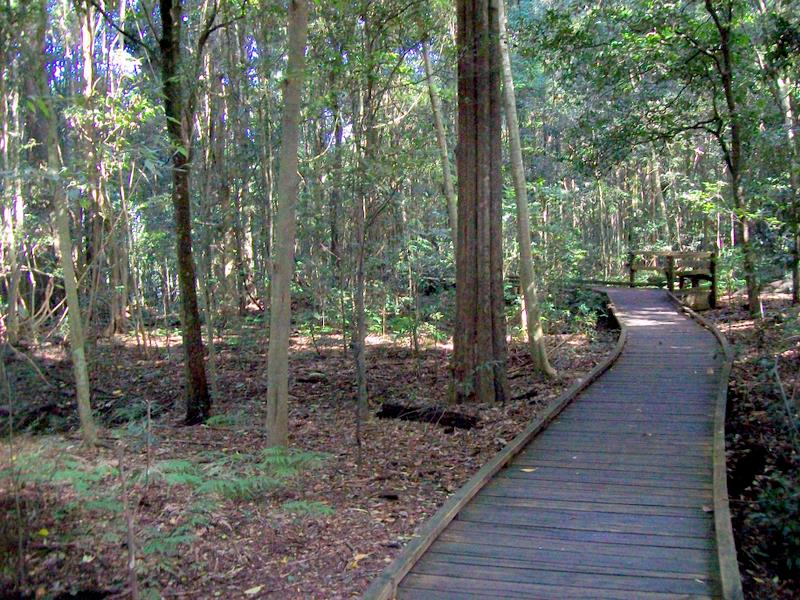
Black apple beside the boardwalk

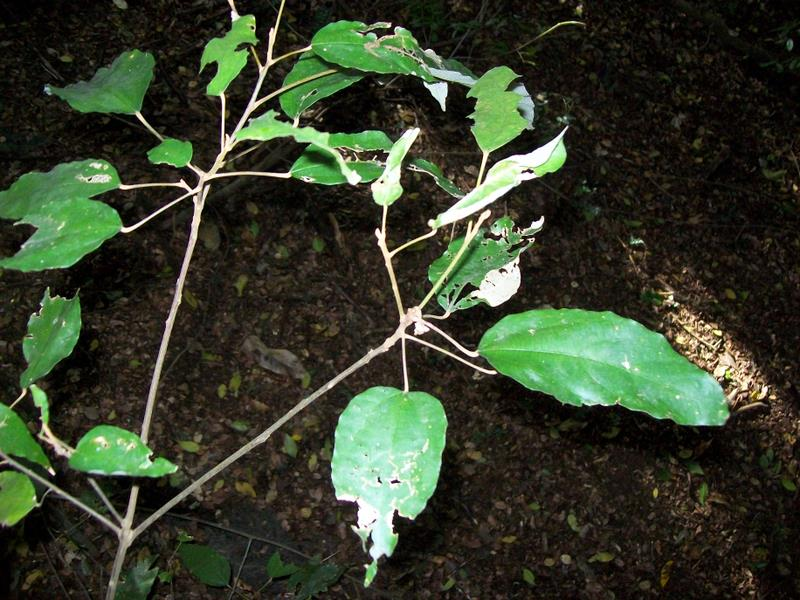
Red kamala

== See also ==
- Protected areas of New South Wales
