= Wingham Post Office =

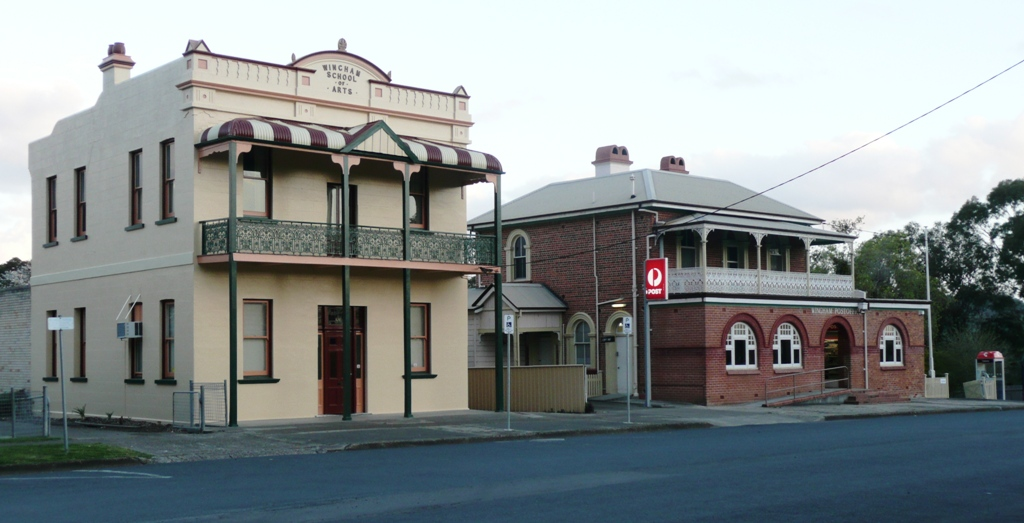
- Wingham Library and Post Office (on right)

- Location within New South Wales Location within Australia
- 31.8703°S 152.3761°E
- Location: Wynter Street, Wingham, New South Wales, Australia

Site notes
- Architect: Colonial Architect's Office under James Barnet
- Owner: Australia Post

New South Wales Heritage Register
- Official name: Wingham Post Office
- Type: state heritage (built)
- Designated: 22 December 2000
- Reference no.: 1419
- Type: Post Office
- Category: Postal and Telecommunications
- Builders: Original building constructed by William T. Smith of Cundletown.

Wingham Post Office is a heritage-listed post office at Wynter Street, Wingham, New South Wales, Australia. The original building was designed by the Colonial Architect's Office under James Barnet and constructed by William T. Smith of Cundletown. Additions were designed by the CAO under Barnet's successor, Walter Liberty Vernon, and built by S. A. Levick (1904) and H. W. Alcorn (c. 1909–10). The property is owned by Australia Post. It was added to the New South Wales State Heritage Register on 22 December 2000.

== History ==
The first official postal service in Australia was established in April 1809, when Sydney merchant Isaac Nichols was appointed as the first Postmaster in the colony of New South Wales. Prior to this, mail had been distributed directly by the captain of the ship on which the mail arrived; however, this system was neither reliable nor secure.

In 1825 the colonial administration was empowered to establish a Postmaster General's Department, which had previously been administered from Britain.

In 1828 the first post offices outside of Sydney were established, with offices in Bathurst, Campbelltown, Parramatta, Liverpool, Newcastle, Penrith and Windsor. By 1839 there were forty post offices in the colony, with more opening as settlement spread. The advance of postal services was further increased as the railway network began to be established throughout NSW from the 1860s. Also, in 1863, the Postmaster General W. H. Christie noted that accommodation facilities for postmasters in some post offices was quite limited, and stated that it was a matter of importance that "post masters should reside and sleep under the same roof as the office".

The appointment of James Barnet as Acting Colonial Architect in 1862 coincided with a considerable increase in funding to the public works program. Between 1865 and 1890 the Colonial Architects Office was responsible for the building and maintenance of 169 post offices and telegraph offices in NSW. The post offices constructed during this period were designed in a variety of architectural styles, as Barnet argued that the local parliamentary representatives always preferred "different patterns".

The construction of new post offices continued throughout the 1890s Depression years under the leadership of Walter Liberty Vernon, who retained office from 1890 to 1911. While twenty-seven post offices were built between 1892 and 1895, funding to the Government Architect's Office was cut from 1893 to 1895, causing Vernon to postpone a number of projects.

Following Federation in 1901, the Government of Australia took over responsibility for post, telegraph and telephone offices, with the Department of Home Affairs Works Division being made responsible for post office construction. In 1916 construction was transferred to the Department of Works & Railways, with the Department of the Interior responsible during World War II.

On 22 December 1975 the Postmaster General's Department was abolished and replaced by the Postal & Telecommunications Department, with Australia Post and Telcom being established. In 1989, the Australian Postal Corporation Act established Australia Post as a self-funding entity, which heralded a new direction in property management, including a move towards smaller, shop-front style post offices away from the larger more traditional buildings.

For much of its history, the post office has been responsible for a wide variety of community services including mail distribution, as agencies for the Commonwealth Savings Bank, electoral enrolments, and the provision of telegraph and telephone services. The town post office served as a focal point for the community, most often built in a prominent position in the center of town close to other public buildings, creating a nucleus of civic buildings and community pride.

=== Wingham Post Office ===
The first Post Office to serve Wingham was established on 1 September 1853, located approximately four miles from Wingham at Bungay, moving to Wingham in 1856. For the next 28 years the office continued to operate out of temporary accommodation until the erection of an official office in the town. The Post and Telegraph Offices were amalgamated in April 1880, having worked from separate buildings since the arrival of the telegraph in 1879.

In March 1880, Robert Burdett Smith MP presented a petition to the Postmaster General asking for the construction of an official Post and Telegraph Building in Wingham. With the backing of the Superintendent of the Telegraph Department for a new building in January 1881, a letter was sent to the Minister for Works requesting the erection of a new building. In May 1881, James Henry Young MP responded to another public meeting by recommending a site for a new office. This site was a portion of the Government Reserve commencing at the southwest corner of the Public School, extending to Farquhar Street and bounded by Wynter Street on the western side. The choice of the site on the Government Reserve caused continuing delays to the project, as the Postmaster General's Department and the Lands Department squabbled over the positioning of the building.

Following further representations to Parliament from the residents of Wingham, the Postmaster General (PMG) gave approval for £1,000 to be placed on the Parliament estimates committee for the erection of a new office at Wingham. The site chosen was changed after the Lands Department objected to the building being on the Government Reserve, and they recommended a site facing Isabella Street.

Despite the ongoing problem with the selection of a site for the building, plans for the office were still being drawn by the Colonial Architect. The Postal Inspector, De Milhau, who had recommended the original site on the government reserve, suggested that Wingham Post Office be based on similar sized offices at Wallsend, Clarence Town and Dungog. The estimated cost for such a building was £1,425, or £1,700 with an underground tank and fencing. In July, Inspector De Milhau recommended that the site proposed be selected, with an additional 100 feet to Isabella Street secured. In December 1882 the Lands Department again advised the PMG about their objections to the proposed site and suggested a site adjoining the Public School that had a frontage to Isabella Street of 125 links and a depth of 400 links. The PMG rejected this advice, advising the Lands Department that a site with 200-foot frontage to Isabella Street was needed.

The Colonial Architect submitted a fresh plan for the building on 13 December 1882 for an estimated cost of £1,325, which was approved by the PMG. Again the Lands Department raised objections to the site, arguing against the curtailing of the Recreational Reserve; however, the PMG approved the erection of the building and informed the Lands Department on 7 April 1883.

On 10 April 1883 the Public Works Department advised that the tender for the erection of Wingham Post and Telegraph Office had been awarded to W.T. Smith for £1,625, with underground tank and fencing, to be completed within 12 months. Confusion over the site remained even after the tender was awarded, with the Department of Public Instruction complaining that the new office would be directly in front of the school teacher's residence. However, the office was not in front of the teacher's house, and the building continued.

The Postmaster, James Hodgins, advised the PMG that he moved into the new office on 27 June 1884. In March 1886 a temporary building was added to the office to serve as a bathroom for the Postmaster and his family. A permanent bathroom was not added until 1895-6, being seen as an expensive extravagance prior to the turn of the 1900s. During the 1890s, before 1896, a first-floor verandah and post boxes were also added.

Between 1902 and 1910 a number of alterations and extensions were made to the Post Office building. A new counter was installed in 1902, with a battery and store room being erected the following year. Batteries were used to provide electric current to the morse equipment. S. A. Levick of Cundletown made other repairs and alterations to the building during 1904 for a cost of £136. Part of this work included the construction of a front entrance lobby and the removal of a dividing wall in the residential section to create one room.

In 1909, a portion of the front office was partitioned to allow for a private space for the public telephone to be located in, as privacy on the phone had been a problem. A manual telephone exchange had been added to the office in August of the same year.

In September 1909, two plans were submitted for the extension of the public space in the office. The plan that was eventually accepted included the use of a verandah and provided for an office 29 feet x 15 feet and a public space of 21 feet x 6 feet 9 inches. The tender was awarded to H. W. Alcorn of Taree for £256, but cost £299.2.9 to complete.

Up to 1923, a number of outbuildings were also added to the complex, including a linesmen's office, engineer's stores and tools shed, a mechanic's room and store, tool and battery room and a slab shed for records storage. These extensions represent the growing population of the district and the growing importance of the Post and Telegraph service to the district. Further extensions were added to the building in 1922 at a cost of £944.6.3, but the details of the works are unknown.

In 1983, $39,000 was spent on major renovation and refurbishment of the Wingham Post Office, which included the erection of a wooden picket fence and interior redesign to reflect the historic nature of the Office. The building was also repainted in a colour scheme sympathetic to its heritage values.

== Description ==
Wingham Post Office is a two-storey face and painted brick Victorian Regency building, with a Federation Filigree influenced first-floor verandah, and Federation Free Style infill and addition to the ground floor. It was originally a symmetrical building, and has a tan coloured hipped corrugated steel roof. The southern single-storey addition has a shallow hipped corrugated steel roof and the rear outbuildings are hipped or skillion, excepting the early toilet structure to the rear with a narrow gabled roof. Three chimneys punctuate the roof line; two corbelled, rendered and painted chimneys to the two-storey section north and west ridge lines, and one corbelled face brick chimney to the rear kitchen.

Additions to the Post Office have been extensive, including the first-floor verandah (c. 1890s), the brick infill of the ground-floor verandah (c. 1911), the complementary single-storey addition to the south (1920s) and numerous outbuildings and structures of varying ages. The outbuildings are predominantly constructed of weatherboard or face brick.

There is a full length verandah to the first-floor western facade overlooking the street. It has an asphalt lined floor, cream painted cast iron balustrade, cast iron posts and brackets, light green painted boarded soffit and a face brick balustraded southern end. A notable feature of the verandah is a grooved stone gutter around its perimeter. There is a rear ground-floor verandah between the main building and the detached hipped roof kitchen, with a concrete floor and steps, picketed balustrade, timber posts and green painted boarded soffit. To the northern facade is the original gable ended timber porch forming the entry to the stairwell. It has a raked boarded soffit, square timber posts, brackets and vertical boarded valance and gable infill.

The ground-floor front facade is constructed in reddish-brown stretcher bond brickwork with rubbed and tuck pointed, corbelled, wide, red brick arches over windows and the main entry, continuing with a matching low string course between and to the sides. The first floor has English bond face brick to the northern and western facades, and cream painted brickwork to the remaining.

Fenestration of the building is regular, with arched sash windows to the original section of the building, in particular to the first-floor south, west and north facades. There is a single squared sash window to the rear facade centre and to the ground-floor front facade are the c. 1911-1920s multi-pane, wide arched windows, with squared sash windows to the southern facade ground floor. There are shallow brick arched headers to the southern ground floor windows and brick sills, however the original arched windows to the first floor and northern facade ground floor retain classically moulded architraves and sills, currently painted a tan colour. The doorways to the northern facade ground floor and the first-floor centre French doors also retain original moulded architraves.

The ground floor of Wingham Post Office comprises five main areas. These include a small carpeted retail area to the southwestern corner, carpeted mail sorting and storage to the northwestern corner, contractor's room at the centre, partitioned carpeted offices to the southeastern corner and staff facilities to the rear. The staff facilities incorporate the vinyl floored original kitchen and early outbuildings further to the rear. The retail area does not maintain a standard Australia Post c. 1990s fitout of display wall panelling and grey colour scheme, as seen in many other offices.

Ceilings to the ground floor comprise square set plaster ceilings, plasterboard ceilings with a coved cornice to the main building and board and batten ceilings to the southern single-storey addition. There are banks of attached and suspended fluorescent lights to the ground floor, with pendant lights to the retail area and a ceiling fan. There is also intrusive air conditioning ducting to the ground floor, both exposed ducting and vents in some walls.

White painted architraves appear to be original and in good condition, and there is a simple picture rail to the original section of building. Some original skirting is retained to the contractor's room, and is painted dark brown.

Windows to the ground floor comprise the multi-pane wide arched windows to the western side, two pane upper and lower arched windows to the northern side and squared six pane upper and single lower pane sash windows to the southern side. There are later doorways punched through some original fabric, and there are modern flush security doors and a glazed front retail door to the exterior. Some original four panel doors are retained to the ground floor with fanlights over, particularly to the stairwell, the remainder being modern doors and open doorways.

Walls are rendered and painted brick in a yellow/beige colour scheme, with a half glazed plasterboard partitioned office to the southern side. Fireplaces have been bricked in, one surround being retained to the contractors room.

The stair in the northeastern corner is carpeted and retains original turned and carved polished timber posts and squared balusters and is in good condition, with metal edge strips to the treads and original skirting.

The first floor of Wingham Post Office is tenanted, and currently comprises four offices and a reception area accessed via the original stair to the northeastern corner. The entire first floor is carpeted.

Ceilings to the first floor are mostly plasterboard with a coved cornice; however, some square-set plaster ceilings have been retained. Lighting is single fluorescent tubes, with a pendant light to the stairwell. There are no air conditioning ducts to the ceilings, however a single unit is located on the northern wall of the reception area.

Architraves to the first floor appear to be original moulded timber and in very good condition. Skirting appears to be original, and complementary fabric has been installed to the later office and cupboard addition adjacent to the reception area.

Windows are original two pane upper and lower sash windows with an arched upper sash. The internal doors are original four panel with fanlights over. The original door of the western wall at the top of the stair and fanlight have been relocated to the new office adjacent to reception, with complementary architrave fabric used. Original French doors have also been retained to the verandah, with a later screen door.

Walls are painted rendered brick, with a c. 1994 plasterboard partitioned office adjacent to reception and the arched fireplaces have been retained, with slate surrounds.

Signage to Wingham Post Office is simply lettering across the front facade at the first floor level, centred over the front arched entry. A standard Australia Post sign on a post is located to the northwestern corner of the building.

The Post Office is an important historic feature located on a major thoroughfare within Wingham. It is flanked by the two-storey complementary Victorian School of Arts building to the north and the unsympathetic modern red brick Telstra building to the southeast. Directly opposite the Post Office is Wingham Park, which is bordered by mature trees, maintaining an open grassed field within. Landscaping within the site is limited to a concrete footpath to the west, though the grassed rear yard of the building contains many mature trees, shrubs and garden beds, including frangipanis, jacaranda and ferns, with some concrete paths. There is a picket fence to the front boundary of the site and an information sign and telephone booths to the south on the footpath.

There is a carport to the northeastern corner of the building and attached weatherboard skillion shed to the eastern end. Another skillion roofed weatherboard addition is located to the rear southern side of the yard containing a store and toilet, with an early brick toilet addition and corrugated iron privacy screens adjacent to the north. Two separate weatherboard additions are attached to the kitchen east and south sides and there is another to the northern end of the rear verandah, currently storage. A covered concrete walkway links the majority of the outbuildings.

Wingham Post Office was reported to be generally in very good condition as at 3 August 2000. Archaeological potential for the site is considered high.

While there have been a series of additions and alterations to Wingham Post Office, and the original form of the building is still apparent in remnant fabric, the remaining original interior fabric on the ground floor has been altered substantially. The exterior is in very good condition and intact. The Post Office retains the features which make it culturally significant, including architectural details such as the decorative filigree verandah with cast iron posts, wide arched windows, and medium pitch roof, and its overall form and style.

=== Modifications and dates ===
The original building was completed in 1884, comprising a two-storey face brick building with an awning to the ground floor entrance.

In 1886, a wash house was apparently constructed.

The first floor verandah would have been added c. 1890s, along with the installation of post boxes.

A bathroom and two earth closets were constructed in 1895-6.

During the 1904 alterations, a new counter was provided, the front entrance lobby appears to have been altered, the removal of a wall between two rooms of the private residence occurred and a battery and store were erected.

Later additions, including the arched window brick infill of the ground floor verandah for additional office space occurred during alterations in c. 1910.

The 1920s saw major extensions occur, most likely including the southern side single-storey addition and some rear outbuildings and weatherboard additions. This may also have been the time when the southern end of the first-floor verandah was enclosed with a low brick wall and glazing above.

During the 1980s the entrance porch was tiled and in 1983 more renovations were carried out, including the reinstatement of the picket fence and the addition of ceiling fans and modern light fittings, along with a new colour scheme.

Plans from 1993 indicate the construction of the concrete covered walkway between outbuilding to the rear and the installation of internal office partitions for the southern office. Also included on these plans is the apparent conversion of the residence ground-floor dining and living room to the mail contractors room. Removal of wall fabric opened up the former northwestern corner office, and the removal of the former lunch room and kitchenette to the southeast corner opened up the office space. At around this time, the upper floor section of the residence was converted to office space, the bathroom removed and a partition wall constructed to create another office at the western side at the centre.

Very little appears to have changed since this time, the only noticeable alteration being the removal of the glazing to the first-floor southern end of the verandah. The main intrusive elements on the site are the carport to the northeastern corner of the building and the modern red brick Telstra building to the southern side.

== Heritage listing ==
Wingham Post Office is significant at a State level for its historical associations, aesthetic qualities and social meaning.

Wingham Post Office is associated with the early development of the town, as it is linked with the original postal services established in 1853 in nearby Bungay, and in Wingham in 1856. Wingham Post Office has been the centre of communications for Wingham for over a century, and reflects the intensive community agitation in the late nineteenth century for improved communication services in the area.

Wingham Post Office also provides evidence of the changing nature of postal and telecommunications practices and important information on the changing requirements and standards in working conditions in NSW.

Wingham Post Office is aesthetically significant because it is a strong example of the Victorian Regency style, with Federation period additions, and makes an important aesthetic contribution to the civic precinct in Wingham. Wingham Post Office is also associated with the Colonial Architect's Office under James Barnet, and the Government Architect's Office under Walter Liberty Vernon.

Wingham Post Office is also considered to be significant to the Wingham community's sense of place.

Wingham Post Office was listed on the New South Wales State Heritage Register on 22 December 2000 having satisfied the following criteria.

The place is important in demonstrating the course, or pattern, of cultural or natural history in New South Wales.

Wingham Post Office is associated with the early development of the town, as it is linked with the original postal services established in 1853 in nearby Bungay, and in Wingham in 1856.

Wingham Post Office is also historically significant because it has been the centre of communications for the community for over a century, and reflects the intensive community agitation in the late nineteenth century for improved communication services in the area.

Wingham Post Office also provides evidence of the changing nature of postal and telecommunications practices and important information on the changing requirements and standards in working conditions in NSW.

The additions made to Wingham Post Office to improve the accommodation facilities for the residing postmasters reflects the changing requirements and standards in working conditions in NSW. Wingham Post Office is historically significant because it is associated with the Colonial Architect's Office under James Barnet, which designed and maintained a number of post offices across NSW between 1865 and 1890.

The additions and alterations carried out in 1904 and 1910 were designed by the NSW Government Architect's Office under W.L. Vernon.

The place is important in demonstrating aesthetic characteristics and/or a high degree of creative or technical achievement in New South Wales.

Wingham Post Office is an architecturally distinct building incorporating a combination of the Victorian Regency, Federation Filigree and Federation Free Classical architectural styles, with such characteristics as the decorative filigree verandah with cast iron posts, wide arched windows, and medium pitch roof. As such, it is considered to be an unusual country town post office with strong aesthetic value.

Wingham Post Office also makes a valuable contribution to the late Victorian and Federation character of the civic precinct around the central park of Wingham.

These qualities make it a landmark in the civic precinct of Wingham.

The place has a strong or special association with a particular community or cultural group in New South Wales for social, cultural or spiritual reasons.

As a prominent civic building, and as the historic centre of communications for the town, Wingham Post Office is considered to be significant to the Wingham community's sense of place.

The place has potential to yield information that will contribute to an understanding of the cultural or natural history of New South Wales.

The site has some potential to contain archaeological information which may provide information relating to the previous use of the site and the evolution of the building and out-buildings associated with the use by the Post Office.

The place possesses uncommon, rare or endangered aspects of the cultural or natural history of New South Wales.

As an unusual example of a combination of Victorian Regency and Federation period architectural styles, Wingham Post Office is considered to be a rare building in NSW.

The place is important in demonstrating the principal characteristics of a class of cultural or natural places/environments in New South Wales.

Wingham Post Office is a good example the Victorian Regency style of architecture. It is part of the group of nineteenth-century post offices in NSW designed by the Colonial Architect's Office under James Barnet. The early 1900s additions and alterations provide good evidence of the portfolio of work, which were designed by the NSW Government Architect's office under Walter Liberty Vernon.
