= Cedar Party Creek =

Coordinates: 31°45′S 152°22′E

Cedar Party Creek Pahpoo Creek

Location
- Country: Australia
- State: New South Wales
- Region: NSW North Coast (IBRA), Mid North Coast
- District: Mid-Coast Council
- Town: Wingham

Physical characteristics
- Source
  - location: near Mooral Creek
- Mouth: confluence with the Manning River
  - location: at Wingham
  - elevation: 17 m (56 ft)
- Length: 21 km (13 mi)

Basin features
- River system: Manning River catchment

Cedar Party Creek, a perennial stream of the Manning River catchment, is located in the Mid North Coast region of New South Wales, Australia.

== Course and features ==
The Cedar Party Creek rises about 2.4 kilometres (1.5 mi) southeast of the village of Mooral Creek. The river flows generally south by east before reaching its confluence with the Manning River, at Wingham; over its 21 kilometres (13 mi) course.

The Manning River eventually flows into the Tasman Sea through a minor delta east of Taree.

== See also ==
- List of rivers of Australia
- List of rivers in New South Wales (A-K)
- Rivers of New South Wales
