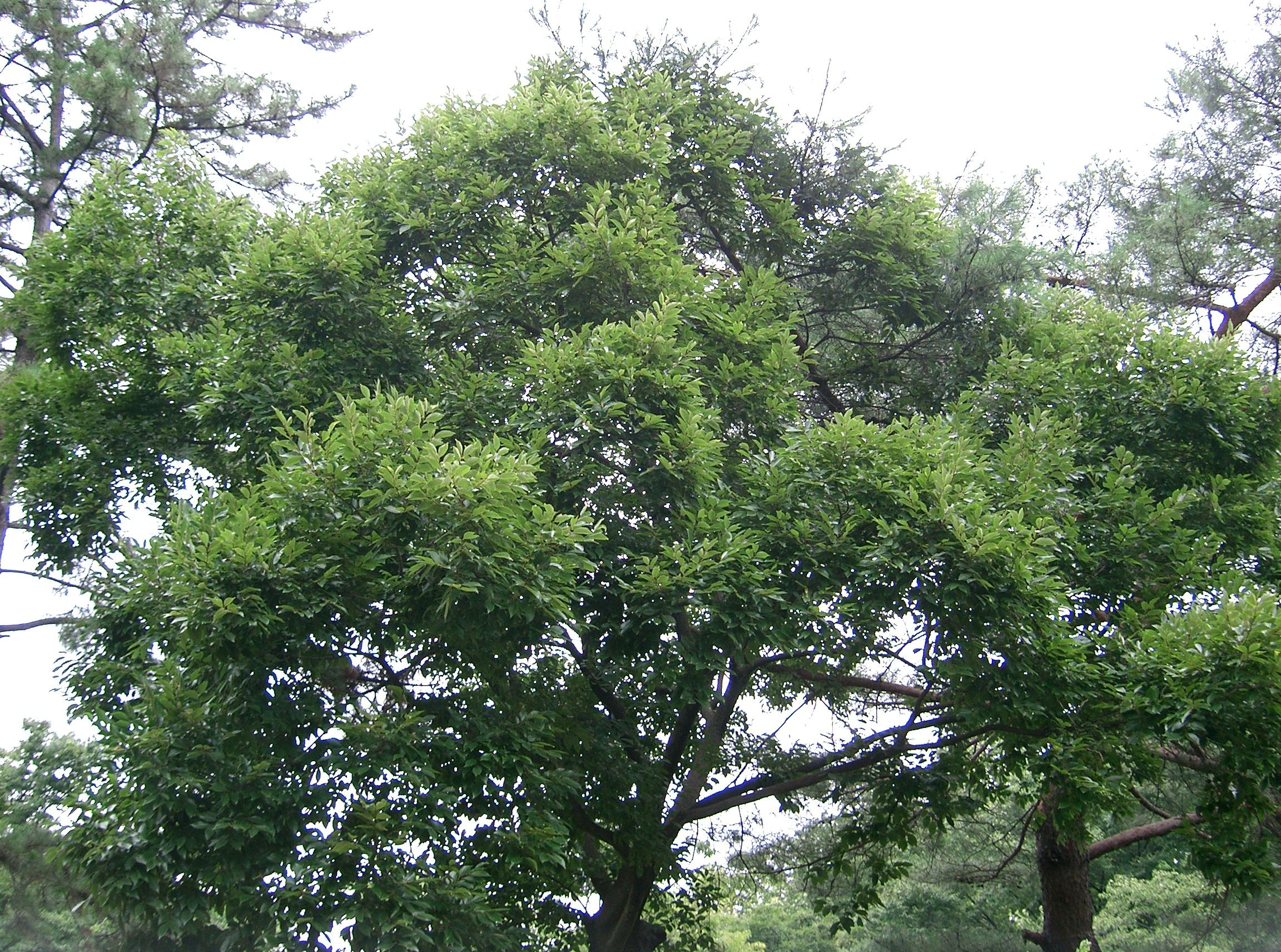

Scientific classification
- Kingdom: Plantae
- Clade: Tracheophytes
- Clade: Angiosperms
- Clade: Eudicots
- Clade: Rosids
- Order: Rosales
- Family: Cannabaceae
- Genus: Aphananthe
- Species: A. aspera

Binomial name
- Aphananthe aspera (Thunb.) Planch.

Synonyms
- Homoioceltis aspera (Thunb.) Blume; Prunus aspera Thunb.

= Aphananthe aspera =

Species of tree

Aphananthe aspera, commonly known as scabrous aphananthe or muku tree, is a flowering plant in the family Cannabaceae. It is found on slopes and stream banks between 100 and 1600 m. It is native to China, Taiwan, Japan, Korea, and Vietnam.

== Uses ==
It is used as an ornamental plant in Chinese classical gardens. Aphananthe aspera is a source of fibre and wood, and has been used for making paper. Leaves gathered in autumn are used as a fine sandpaper for polishing wood and similar materials. It is not clear from the sources referred to, whether the effectiveness of the leaves as sandpaper depends on their roughness, or whether they contain abrasive phytoliths.
