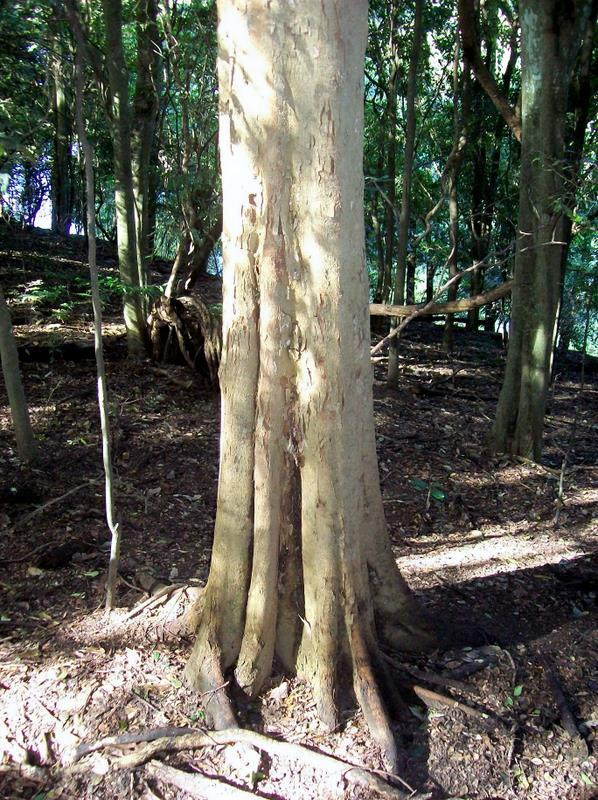
- Aphananthe philippinensis

Scientific classification
- Kingdom: Plantae
- Clade: Tracheophytes
- Clade: Angiosperms
- Clade: Eudicots
- Clade: Rosids
- Order: Rosales
- Family: Cannabaceae
- Genus: Aphananthe; Planch.

Species
- See text

Synonyms
- Mirandaceltis Sharp 1958

= Aphananthe =

Genus of flowering plants

Aphananthe is a small genus of evergreen trees in the family Cannabaceae. Around six species are recognised, found in Korea, Japan, Madagascar, South-east Asia, Mexico, Central America, and Australia. Leaves are alternate on the stem and toothed. Flowers are unisexual, fruit form as drupes. The generic name of Aphananthe refers to insignificant flowers.

Species include:

- Aphananthe aspera (Thunb.) Planch.
- Aphananthe cuspidata (Blume) Planch.
- Aphananthe monoica (Hemsl.) J.-F.Leroy
- Aphananthe philippinensis Planch.
- Aphananthe sakalava J.-F.Leroy
