= Tinonee, New South Wales =

Town in New South Wales, Australia

Tinonee
- Town
- Tinonee viewed across the Manning River from Andrews Reserve in Taree.

- Coordinates: 31°56′13″S 152°24′50″E
- Country: Australia
- State: New South Wales
- Region: Mid North Coast
- LGA: MidCoast Council

Population
  - Total: 840 (2021)
- Postcode: 2430

Tinonee is a small town on the banks of the Manning River, near Taree on the Mid North Coast of New South Wales, Australia. It is within the Mid-Coast Council local government area. Founded in 1854, Tinonee was one of the earliest European settlements on the Manning River and once a major commercial hub. At the 2021 census, it had a population of 840 people.

Tinonee is situated on Bucketts Way, which formerly served part of the main road between Sydney and Brisbane. A punt once operated across the Manning River between Tinonee and Taree Estate.

== Name ==
The name Tinonee is believed to come from the local Aboriginal Biripi people's word "Tinobi", which means "big shark", or "Tinobah", meaning "place of sharks".

== History ==
The Biripi area takes in such towns as Taree, Wingham, Nabiac, and Tinonee. The Biripi people travelled around their country according to the seasons and the availability of their food sources. They also traded with other Nations for tools, food, and useful equipment. During their travels, they harvested the native plants and utilised them for their survival and their traditional practices. These practices were orally handed down over the generations.

Australian Aboriginal culture is considered one of the world's oldest living cultures. The Indigenous people of Australia have inhabited this region for over 60,000 years. Their history and knowledge is one of an oral nature with the knowledge and wisdom of the very first inhabitants of this land handed down over the millennia so that it still exists today. Aboriginal people have lived in a harmonious way with nature, caring for it and surviving on it. By ensuring nature's survival the Aboriginal people have ensured their own survival.

The cultural, spiritual and philosophical beliefs may vary between tribes and the knowledge of a group may vary from time to time. With the arrival of European settlers into this area, much of the knowledge and customs of the Aboriginal people were slowly changed and some things have been lost or forgotten. Scientists have had to work over recent decades to bridge this gap in Indigenous knowledge. Enormous inroads have been made in creating a better understanding of the traditional Indigenous knowledge of the fauna and flora of Australia. This is partly due to the development of a trusting relationship between certain dedicated individuals who have worked at bridging the social and cultural gaps that were created with the occupation and development of this land

Formerly a major river port town, Tinonee through its history has been the host of such industries as shipbuilding, farming, logging, timber milling and broom making. With such activities, Tinonee would have been quite a hub of activity, and at one time hosted numerous hotels and accommodation houses, to cater for the passing trade. Ships built in Tinonee were known to be taken to sea through the entrance at Harrington, and off to the major ports such as Sydney and further afield. The growth of the town was impacted with the train going through Taree railway station (in 1913), and the opening of the Martin Bridge (in 1940). The Tinonee Historical Museum is being established to cover local history.

== Attractions ==
The old post office serves as a craft and flowers shop and has a teahouse overlooking the Manning River and Taree Estate. Newsreels and films are screened at the Terrace Cinema Museum, which has 22 seats and is the smallest cinema in Australia. This has been noted in the Guinness Book of World Records. It uses original projecting equipment and has authentic slides that are shown occasionally. The Deep Water Shark Gallery displays Aboriginal artwork, including works in wood, clay and paint. Tinonee is also home to a llama visitor centre, where visitors can feed and pet the llamas.

On the road from Tinonee to Wingham is the Brushy Cutting Lookout which offers views of the Manning Valley. The Manning River at Tinonee is a popular place for waterskiing and boating. Andrew's Reserve is a park on the opposite bank and may be accessed from the Taree by taking Edinburgh Drive through Taree Estate.

== Schools ==
Tinonee Public School is a co-educational school, with classes from Kindergarten to Grade 6, located adjacent to the Manning River in the historical centre of the town. The school first opened on 1 October 1859 with Mrs Eliza Jane Baxter as the first teacher. At the end of that year, the school boasted an enrolment of 25 pupils. The school website covers its history well.

== Churches ==
Tinonee is the home to St Luke's Anglican Church, John Knox Presbyterian Church of Eastern Australia, and a Uniting Church congregation, all located near the same intersection, near the highest point in the town.

The current St Luke's Anglican Church was built in 1905, replacing an earlier church dating from the 1860s. Originally a site was set aside on the river flats for an Anglican church allowing people to come to church by boat, but the site was deemed unsuitable because of flooding. St Luke's is situated on a site overlooking the Manning River and was extended in the 1980s when a hall was added to the northern side of the building, allowing views of the river.

John Knox Presbyterian Church was built in 1880 at the corner of Manchester and Winter Streets. This building is home to a congregation of the Presbyterian Church of Eastern Australia, and part of the Parish of the Manning. Before the turn of the 20th century services at John Knox were held in Gaelic.

The Tinonee cemetery is located between the township and Peg Leg Creek on the Bucketts Way.

== Sport ==
The township has hosted an array of sporting clubs, including teams representing the area in Cricket, Rugby league, Netball, Tennis and Association football (soccer). The Tinonee Eagles, also known as the Tinonee Football Club, play Association Football on the Tinonee Recreation Reserve (also known as the Bob Collier Oval). Being made up of players from junior level, through to the over 35's, the club was established in 1971 by Terry Smith from the Manning region.
