= Rhema FM Manning Great Lakes =

Coordinates: 31.8685°S 152.3732°E

Rhema FM Manning Great Lakes is a Christian community radio station broadcasting to the Manning Great Lakes region of New South Wales, Australia.

Rhema FM is operated by Manning Great Lakes Christian Broadcasters Incorporated. Rhema's studios are located at 51a Isabella Street, Wingham and its transmitter is located in nearby Killabakh.

== History ==
Rhema FM began broadcasting as Radio Rhema at 6am Monday 14 March 1994, initially broadcasting on 103.3 FM with a temporary part-time licence. Rhema FM later gained a temporary full-time licence. In 1999 Rhema applied for a permanent licence, but was unsuccessful, with the licence being given to 2TLP The Listening Place, an Indigenous station in nearby Taree.

In 2000 the Australian Broadcasting Authority, now the Australian Communications and Media Authority, issued Rhema FM a temporary full-time licence to broadcast on 106.5 FM, a frequency suggested by Rhema FM. Rhema FM hopes to gain a permanent full-time licence, and was given notice that such a licence may become available in 2003. Rebel Media, operators of Rebel FM and The Breeze, objected to the issuing of a third community licence in the Taree area, indicated that it may want to broadcast in the Taree area in the future.

== Name ==
Rhema (ρημα) is the Ancient Greek word that describes the act of speaking. Rhema FM adopted the name because it is an affiliate of United Christian Broadcasters Australia, which required its stations to bear the Rhema name.

Rhema FM changed its name from Radio Rhema to Rhema FM like many other UCB stations. The first to do so was Rhema FM Newcastle.

== Staff ==
Rhema FM is operated by volunteers and administered by the board of Manning Great Lakes Community Broadcasters Incorporated.

=== Chairman of the Board ===
- Graham Keene (1994–1998)
- Ken George (1998–2002)
- Steve Smith (2002–present)

=== Station Manager ===
- Graham Keene (1994–1998)
- Mark Spencer (1998–present)
