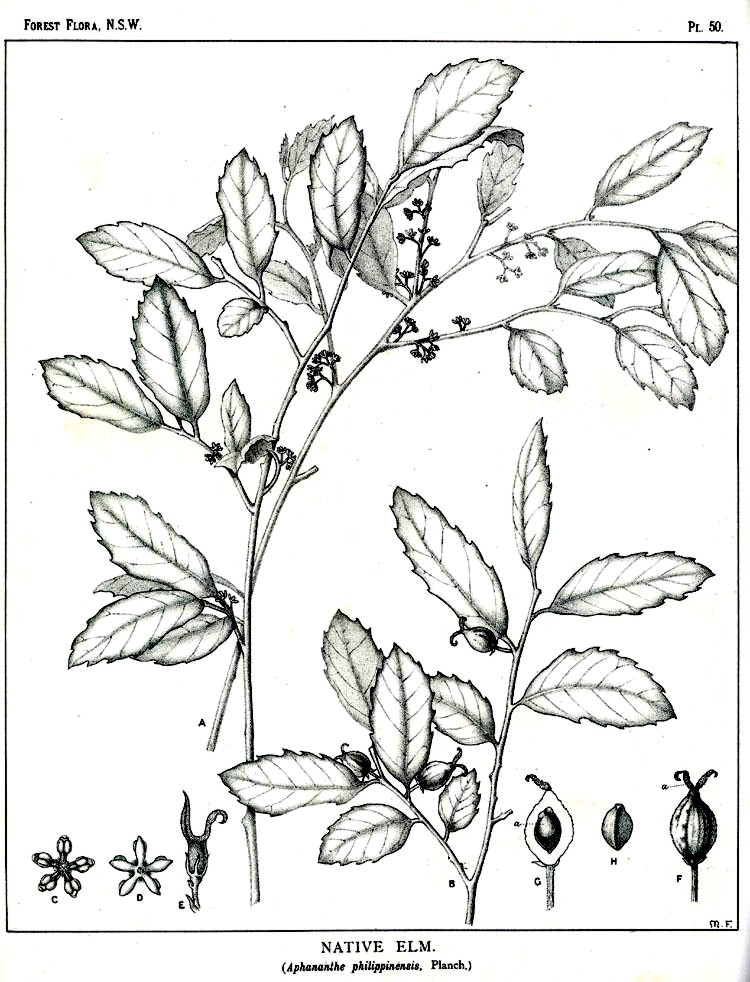
- Drawing by Margaret Flockton

Scientific classification
- Kingdom: Plantae
- Clade: Tracheophytes
- Clade: Angiosperms
- Clade: Eudicots
- Clade: Rosids
- Order: Rosales
- Family: Cannabaceae
- Genus: Aphananthe
- Species: A. philippinensis

Binomial name
- Aphananthe philippinensis Planch.

Synonyms
- Aphananthe rectinervis (F.Muell.) Planch.; Taxotrophis rectinervis F.Muell.; Sponia ilicifolia Kurz

= Aphananthe philippinensis =

Native elm

Species of tree

Aphananthe philippinensis is a common rainforest tree in the family Cannabaceae. In Australia it occurs from the Manning River in New South Wales to near Herberton in tropical Queensland. It was first described from the island of Luzon in the Philippines, hence the species name. The generic name of Aphananthe refers to 'insignificant flowers'. This plant also occurs on the Solomon Islands and in Papua New Guinea

The Australian habitat includes dry rainforest sites. However, it is mostly seen by streams on moist alluvial soils. Common names in Australia include native elm, grey handlewood, axe-handle wood, rough-leaved hickory and asbestos tree.

== Description ==
Growing to 35 metres tall and 85 cm in width, though usually seen as a smaller sized tree. The trunk is fluted and irregular in shape, buttressed at the base. The brown bark sheds irregularly; pustules and bumps give a patchy appearance. Branchlets are grey in colour with longitudinal cracks.

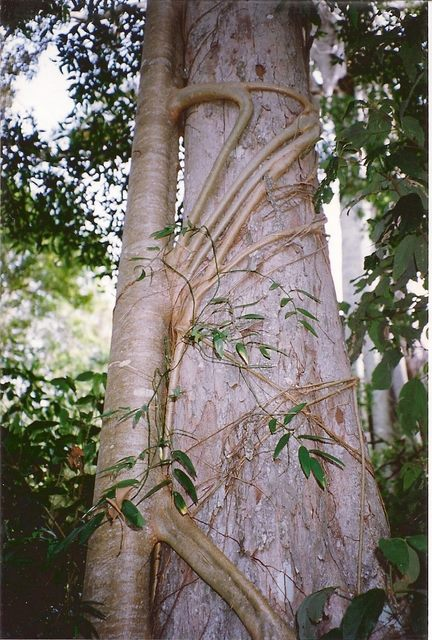
Native elm covered by a Moreton Bay fig and wombat berry vine, growing in a dry rainforest by the Richmond River, Australia

=== Leaves ===
Leaves are alternate on the stem, hard, dry to touch and sandpapery, though easily snapped off and brittle. They are prominently toothed with a sharp prickly point, lanceolate in shape, 4 to 6 cm long, and 1.5 to 3 cm wide. The leaves are green and veiny on both sides, paler below. The leaves have a midrib, with lateral and net veins visible. The midrib is depressed on the upper surface and raised underneath. The midrib is pale in colour under the leaf.

=== Flowers and fruit ===
Male flowers form on small cymes. Female flowers occur on the same plant, being in singles or rarely two together, forming on a 5 mm long stalk. Male and female flowers are around 5 mm long. Flowering is from September to November.

The fruit is an egg-shaped, black drupe, 6 mm long containing a single seed. The seed is 5 mm long, somewhat 'three angled'. Fruit matures from February to June.

== Ecology ==
Native elm is a food tree for the common aeroplane and rounded six-line blue butterflies. Fruit are eaten by a variety of birds, including Australian king parrot, brown cuckoo-dove, black-faced cuckoo-shrike, figbird, green catbird, Lewin's honeyeater, olive-backed oriole, pied currawong, rainbow lorikeet, satin bowerbird, scaly-breasted lorikeet and yellow-eyed cuckoo-shrike.
