= Martin Bridge =

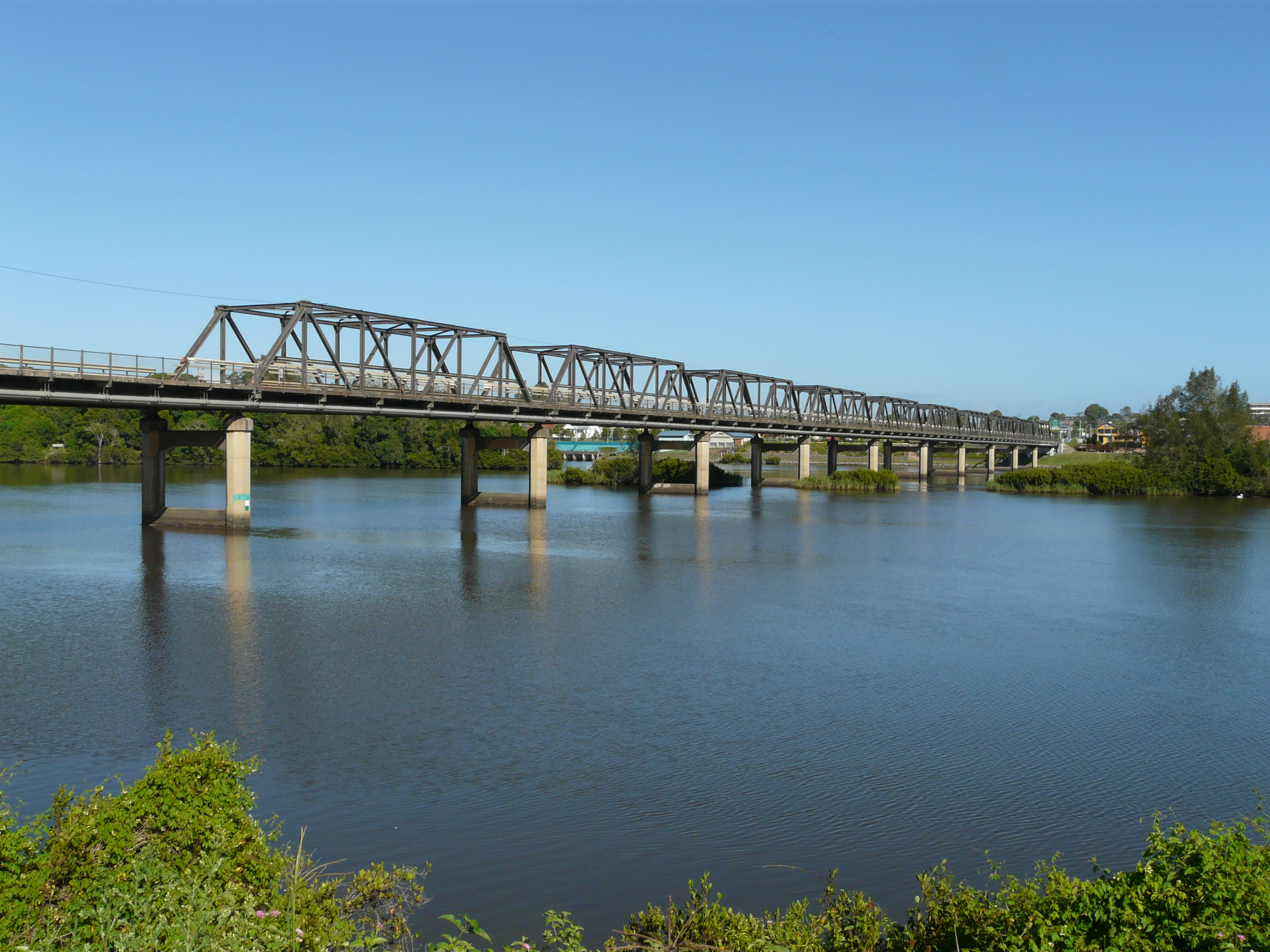
- Martin Bridge
- Coordinates: 31°55′05″S 152°27′33″E
- Carries: Manning River Drive (since 1997); Pacific Highway (1940–1997); Motor vehicles
- Crosses: Manning River
- Locale: Taree, Mid North Coast, New South Wales, Australia
- Begins: Taree
- Ends: South Taree
- Named for: Lewis Martin MP
- Preceded by: Tinonee Road Bridge, Tinonee
- Followed by: Ella Simon Bridge; Henry "Hawkeye" Edwards Bridge

Characteristics
- Design: Truss bridge
- Material: Steel
- Pier construction: Concrete
- Total length: 463 metres (1,519 ft)
- Longest span: 37.1 metres (122 ft)
- No. of spans: 11

History
- Construction start: 1938
- Construction end: 1940
- Construction cost: A£97,000
- Inaugurated: 18 May 1940 by Alexander Mair, Premier of New South Wales
- Replaces: Steam-driven timber punt (1902–1937)
- Replaced by: Ella Simon Bridge; Henry "Hawkeye" Edwards Bridge; (since 1997: concurrent use)

New South Wales Heritage Register
- Official name: Martin Bridge over the Manning River; RTA Bridge No. 1800
- Type: State agency heritage register
- Designated: c. 2010
- Reference no.: s.170
- Type: Road Bridge
- Category: Transport – Land

The Martin Bridge is a road bridge that carries the Manning River Drive across the Manning River in Taree, in the Mid North Coast region of New South Wales, Australia. In 2010, the bridge was added to New South Wales State Heritage Register.

== Description ==
The Martin Bridge is a steel truss bridge of eleven spans, each 37.1 metres (122 ft) long, on concrete supports, with three steel girder approach spans each 12.2 metres (40 ft) long. The total bridge length is 463 metres (1,519 ft). Originally it had a lifting span with two concrete counterbalances. The bridge was opened on 18 May 1940 by the Premier of New South Wales, Alexander Mair, and replaced a steam-driven timber ferry service, in operation since 1902, located at the end of Pulteney Street (the redundant section of approach road on the southern bank of the Manning River leading to the ferry was renamed Old Punt Road). The construction cost was A£97,000.

In an article published in the Newcastle Herald it was reported that the men who built the bridge had to work in air where the pressure was 241 kilopascals (35 psi) and that the cylinders which formed the legs of the bridge were sunk to a depth of 21 metres (70 ft). The article stated that:

"This is the story of men who have to yawn or blow through their noses for 17 minutes before they begin their daily work; who have to wave their heads and legs and arms about and exercise all their joints for 38 minutes before they finish."

— Newcastle Herald, n.d.

The bridge is named in honour of Lewis Martin, the Member for Oxley and the Minister for Works and Local Government at the time of construction. The bridge was the major piece of engineering on a deviation of the Pacific Highway from the previous crossing of the Manning River upstream at Tinonee. The location of the crossing of the Manning River by the Pacific Highway was changed yet again in December 1997 when the Taree bypass opened and two bridges, namely the Ella Simon Bridge and the Henry "Hawkeye" Edwards Bridge, that crossed the Manning River via Dumaresq Island. As a result, most of the traffic now carried by the Martin Bridge is local traffic.

== See also ==
- List of bridges in Australia
- Manning River railway bridge, Taree
