= Wingham, New South Wales =

Wingham
- Town
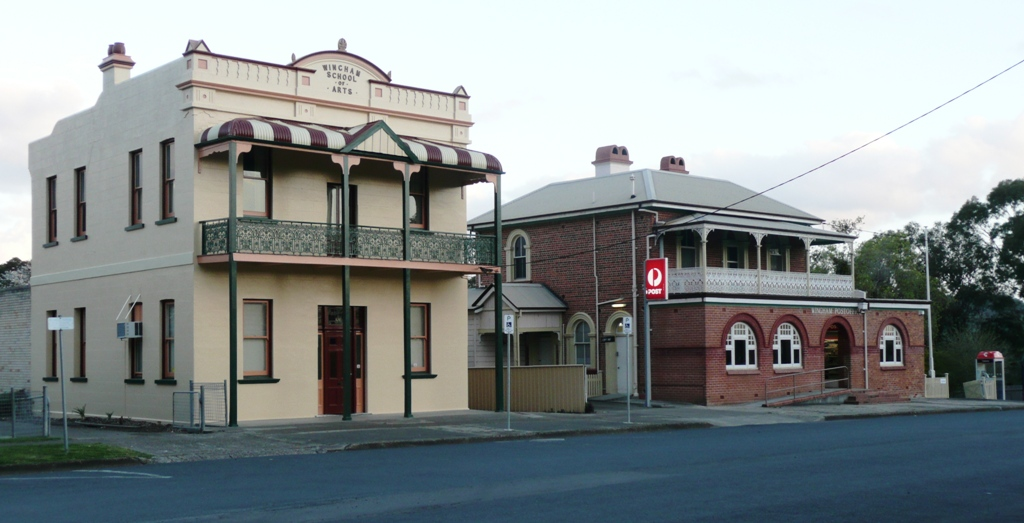
- Wingham Library and Post Office

- Coordinates: 31°52′S 152°22′E
- Country: Australia
- State: New South Wales
- LGA: Mid-Coast Council
- Location: 329 km (204 mi) NE of Sydney; 13 km (8.1 mi) NW of Taree; 614 km (382 mi) S of Brisbane; 90 km (56 mi) SW of Port Macquarie; 46 km (29 mi) N of Forster
- Established: 1844

Government
  - State electorate: Myall Lakes
  - Federal division: Lyne
- Elevation: 17 m (56 ft)

Population
  - Total: 5,395 (2021 census)
- Postcode: 2429

Wingham is a town in the Mid North Coast region of New South Wales, Australia in the Mid-Coast Council area 329 kilometres (204 mi) north of Sydney. According to the 2021 census, Wingham had a population of 5,395.

== History ==
Wingham is located on Biripi country.

The first land grant in the area was made at The Bight to George Rowley in 1841. Wingham was chosen as a location for a government settlement because supply boats could not proceed any further up the Manning River and was also located on the road from Raymond Terrace to Port Macquarie. Named after Wingham in Kent, England, Wingham was proclaimed a village in 1844 but allotments were not made until 1854, the same year that Henry Flett laid out Taree as a private settlement. In the meantime, Tinonee had also been established as a government settlement and in 1866 had a population of 100, compared to 90 at Wingham and 150 at Taree.

Wingham was proclaimed a municipality in 1889. By 1909, Wingham consisted of 285 houses and had a population of 900, but government services had been transferred to Taree, which had a population of 1300 in 269 houses. The municipalities were merged with each other and the Manning Valley Shire in 1981 to form the City of Greater Taree.

== Heritage listings ==
Wingham has a number of heritage-listed sites, including:

- 52 Farquhar Street: Wingham Memorial Town Hall
- Wynter Street: Wingham Post Office

== Climate ==
Wingham has a humid subtropical climate, bordering on oceanic climate and in keeping with most coastal NSW locations, receives fairly even distribution of rainfall, with only a short dry season between July and October. Wingham supports a small and rare subtropical rainforest ecosystem.

Climate data for Wingham
Month	Jan	Feb	Mar	Apr	May	Jun	Jul	Aug	Sep	Oct	Nov	Dec	Year
Mean daily maximum °C (°F)	28.9 (84.0)	28.4 (83.1)	26.9 (80.4)	24.3 (75.7)	21.5 (70.7)	19.0 (66.2)	18.5 (65.3)	20.1 (68.2)	23.0 (73.4)	24.8 (76.6)	26.0 (78.8)	27.7 (81.9)	20.1 (68.2)
Mean daily minimum °C (°F)	18.3 (64.9)	18.2 (64.8)	16.7 (62.1)	13.7 (56.7)	10.1 (50.2)	8.1 (46.6)	6.8 (44.2)	6.8 (44.2)	9.4 (48.9)	11.8 (53.2)	15.2 (59.4)	16.7 (62.1)	12.6 (54.7)
Average precipitation mm (inches)	97.3 (3.832)	135.0 (5.314)	158.9 (6.255)	104.7 (4.123)	93.1 (3.665)	101.7 (4.002)	60.6 (2.387)	54.6 (2.148)	51.1 (2.011)	74.4 (2.930)	115.0 (4.526)	79.1 (3.114)	1,125.5 (44.307)
Average precipitation days (≥ 0.1in)	9.1	9.5	10.2	8.3	7.8	7.0	5.1	5.6	5.4	7.1	8.6	8.1	91.8

== Town ==
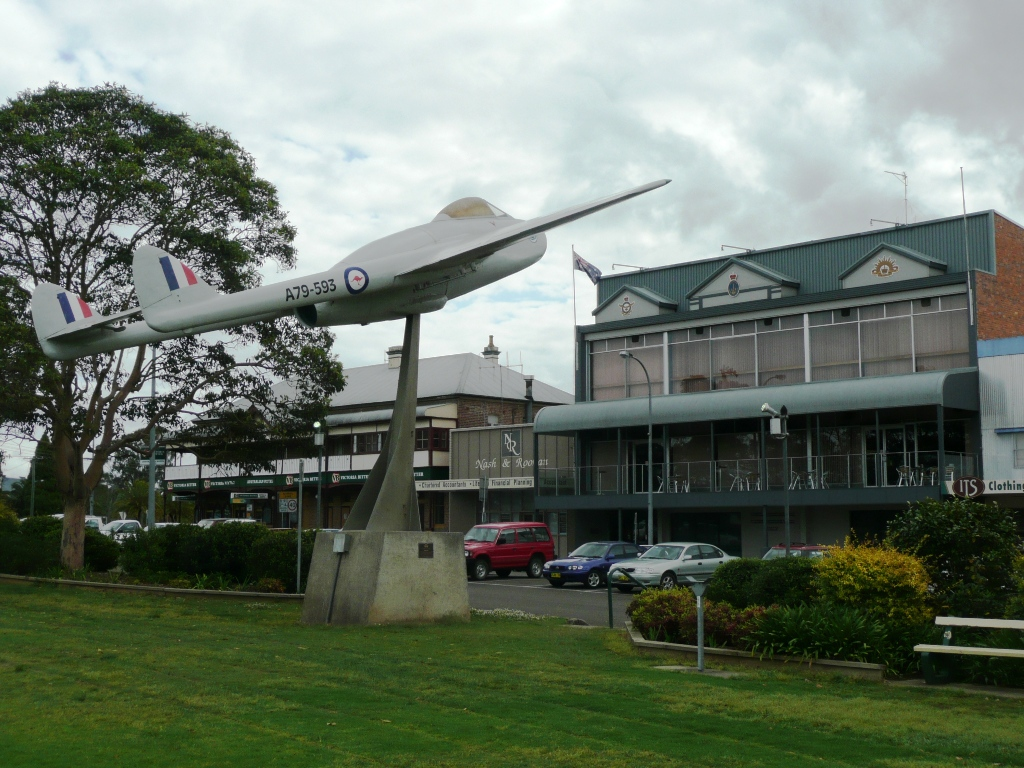
A de Havilland Vampire at Central Park outside the Wingham RSL

Wingham's main street, Isabella Street runs east west and fronts the typically English town square, Central Park. Around the eastern end Central Park are the Wingham Brush Public School, the Victorian style School of Arts, built in 1907 and now a council building with Library at the rear, the state heritage listed Post Office, built in 1884, and a telephone exchange. Along the southern side of the park runs Farquhar Street which has a private residence, the Georgian Revival style Courthouse, built in 1934, the 1909 Federation style police station, Catholic Presbytery, St. Joseph's Catholic School, Our Lady of Perpetual Succour Catholic Church, the Manning Valley Historical Society rooms and Museum and a dental surgery. On the corner of Bent and Farquhar Streets stands the old Gibson and Skinner Butchery, built in 1911. Bent Street runs along the western side of Central Park and is home to the Australian Hotel (the Top Pub to the locals), the Wingham District Memorial Services Club, formerly a Returned Services League Social Club and various shops. Shops also dominate the northern side of the park. The Northeast corner was occupied by the Wingham Hotel or Bottom Pub from 1926 until it burned down on 5 July 2010.

Historical population
Year	Pop.	±%
1921	1,172	—
1933	1,600	+36.5%
1947	2,097	+31.1%
1954	2,591	+23.6%
1961	2,887	+11.4%
1966	2,827	−2.1%
1971	2,919	+3.3%
1976	3,435	+17.7%
1981	3,937	+14.6%
1986	4,297	+9.1%
1991	4,407	+2.6%
1996	4,446	+0.9%
2001	4,660	+4.8%
2006	4,812	+3.3%
2011	4,518	−6.1%
2016	4,532	+0.3%
2021	4,556	+0.5%
Source: Australian Bureau of Statistics data.

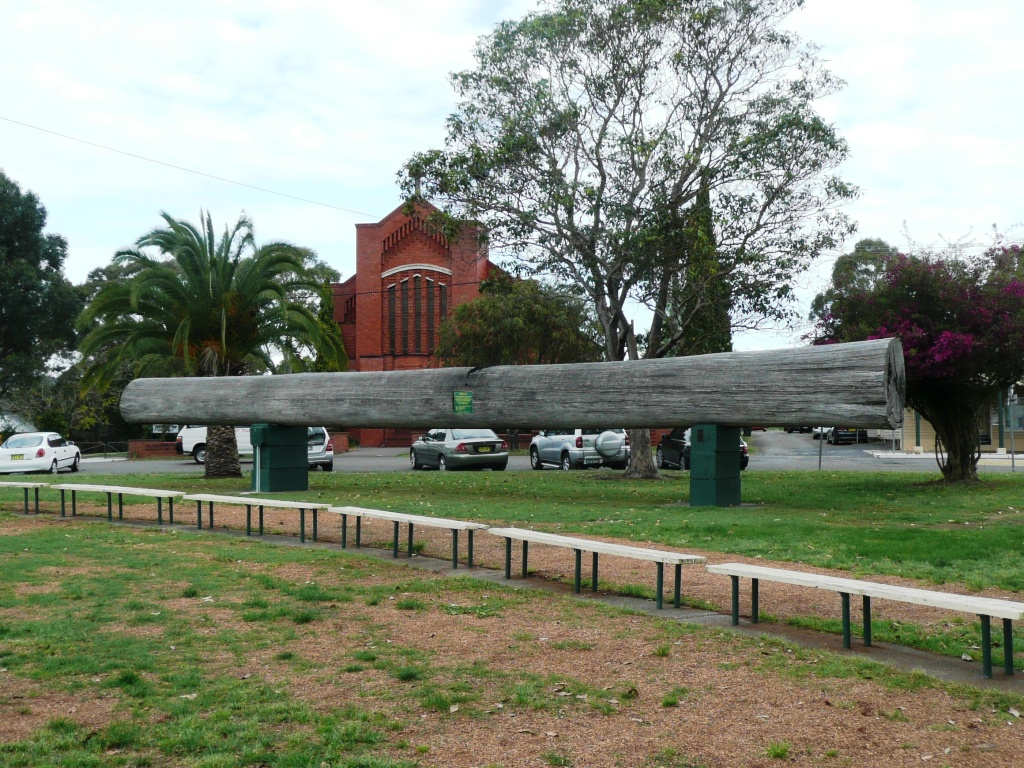
The Big Log opposite Wingham Roman Catholic Church

Central Park itself is home to "The Log," a massive log felled in the surrounding countryside which serves to remind the townsfolk of the timber (and dairy) driven history of the area, a de Havilland Vampire fighter plane (opposite the RSL Club), a cricket pitch (Phil Tufnell played an exhibition match in Wingham in which he was bowled for a duck in the first innings, by Glenn Levine, but made a good fist of it in the second), some children's play equipment, a drinking fountain commemorating the installation of mains water in the town, a small ornamental waterfall (which has been filled in with a garden), and two flag poles at opposite ends of the northern side of the park.

== Education ==
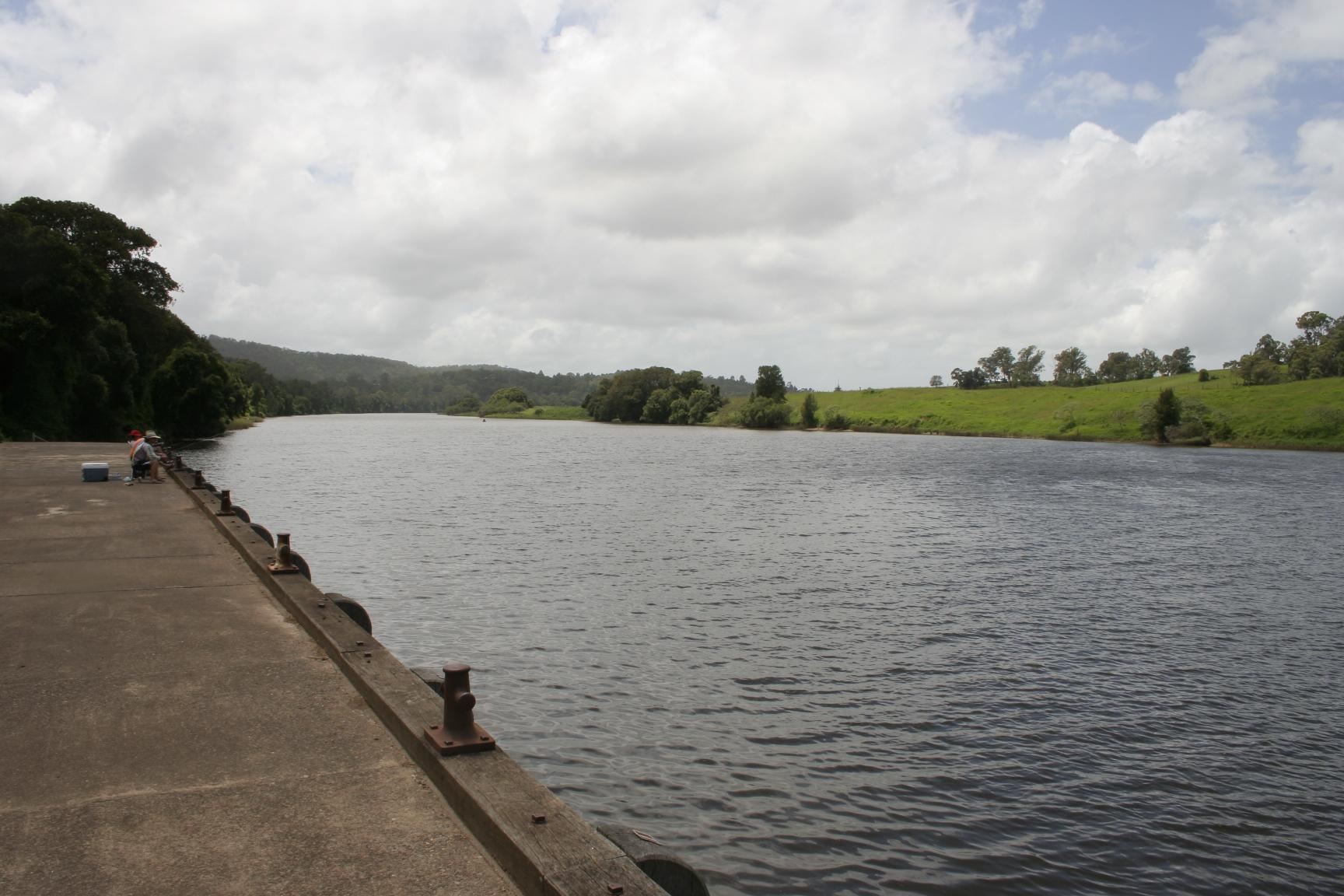
The old cargo wharf on the Manning River

There are five schools in Wingham. Wingham Public School is located in Murray Road, and is known to the locals as Murray Road Public School. St Joseph's Catholic School is located between the Catholic Church and Presbytery on the southern side of Central Park, Wingham Special Education primary school for young mentally challenged children, located in the north end of Richardson Street and Wingham Brush Public School is around the corner between the eastern side of Central Park and Wingham Brush.

Wingham High School is located three blocks northeast of Central Park, and has an extensive agricultural science department, owning three properties and a feedlot. The WHS Agricultural Show Team breeds all their own cattle through both natural mating and artificial insemination. They specialize in commercial beef animals, and have won first ribbons for hoof and hook, steer competitions, as well as junior judging and parading, in such shows as the Royal Sydney Show, Royal Brisbane Show and Tamworth Show.

== Tourism ==
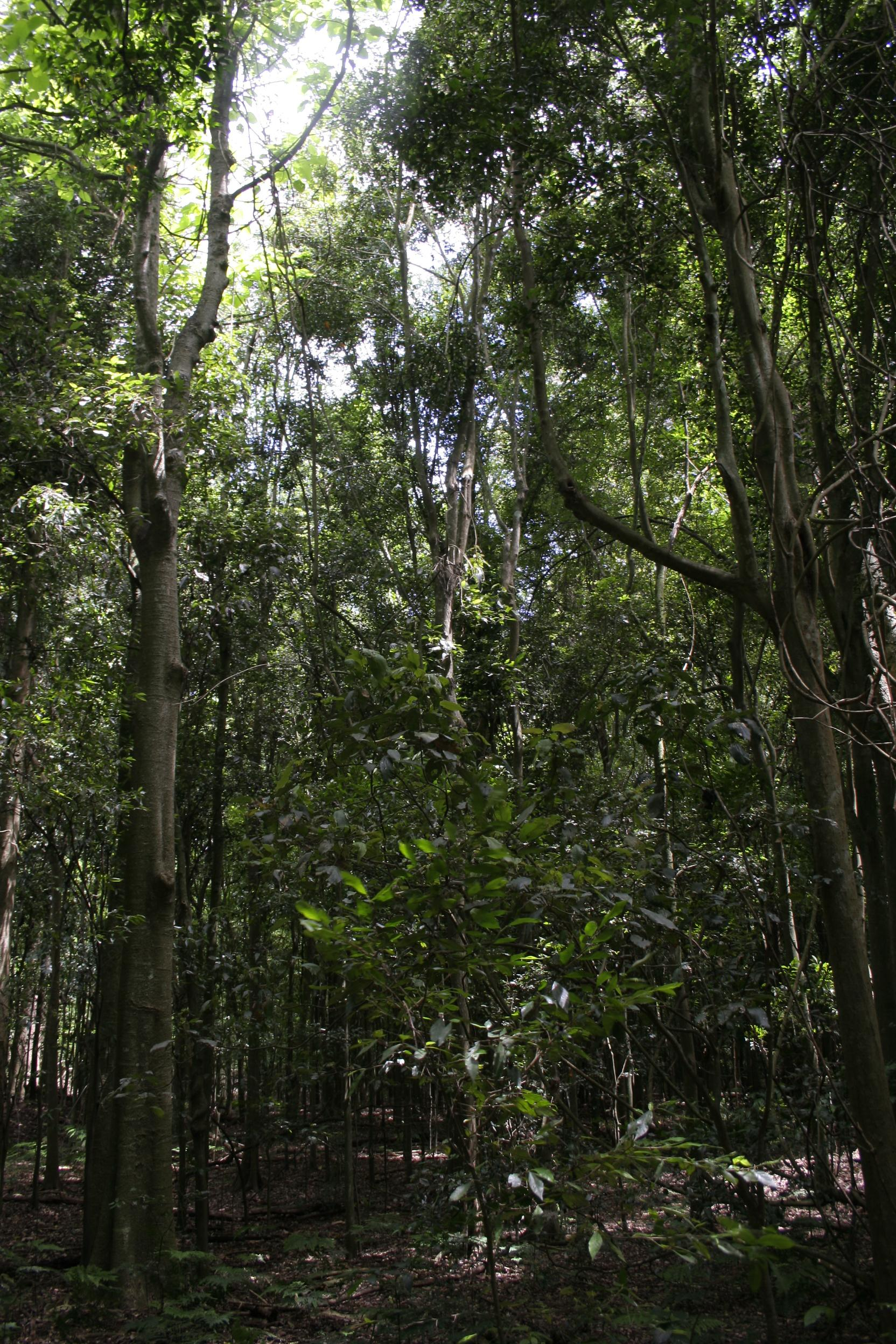
Wingham Brush

Along the Manning River is Wingham Brush, an area of lowland tropical rainforest remnant on a floodplain, including spectacular Moreton Bay fig trees and home to a colony of Grey Headed flying foxes. The story of the restoration of Wingham Brush from a weed infested area of public land is an epic tale of a small band of dedicated volunteers battling entrenched regeneration doctrine, competing interests, bureaucracy and public opinion. Thankfully the volunteers and local know-how prevailed and Wingham Brush remains a fantastic tropical rainforest remnant that brings tourists from around the world to view the rainforest and the flying foxes nightly exit over the Manning River at Wingham Riverside Reserve (WRR) overnight camping area.Unfortunately the camping area was washed away in the 2025 record floods. There is no longer an amenities block, camping area or a boat ramp at Wingham Brush. For many years the flying foxes were considered pests and various initiatives were taken to remove them, including offering free ammunition to those willing to shoot them. These efforts proved ineffective and, in more recent years, moves have been taken to protect the flying foxes, which have become a tourist attraction.

Wingham is the gateway to the Ellenborough Falls on the Bulga Plateau, the second longest single drop waterfall in the Southern Hemisphere. The Bank Guesthouse, formerly the local branch of the Westpac Bank, featured on the Seven Network's Sydney Weekender with Mike Whitney in 1999.

== Jimmy Governor ==
The infamous murderer and fugitive Jimmy Governor was incarcerated in Wingham immediately after his capture. The cell in which he was imprisoned is on display at the Manning Historical Society Museum. A memorial to Governor is located at the site of his capture, a 30-minute drive west along the Wingham-Elands road, outside the small town of Bobin.

== Communications ==
Wingham did have a local newspaper, the Wingham Chronicle, however the office has been closed for a number of years and the paper is now combined with the Manning River Times. It is a paid subscription service. Rhema FM Manning Great Lakes radio station operates from Wingham.

Di Morrissey, one of Australia's most successful novelists with 23 best-selling novels and two children's books, was born in Wingham on 18 March 1948.

== Transport ==
Wingham is served by the NSW TrainLink Grafton, Casino and Brisbane XPT services on the North Coast railway line with complementing bus services which travel to Broadmeadow and Newcastle Interchange connecting with services to and from Sydney. Six XPT services stop at Wingham (three in each direction). Night time XPT services ceased calling at Wingham from the early 1990s until around 2011. Night time services stopping in Wingham ended in the early 1990s when the station became unattended. Wingham station opened on 5 February 1913 and features single platform and a 780-metre crossing loop which is predominantly used for freight cargo traveling along the North Coast railway line.

== People ==
According to the 2021 census, Wingham had a population of 5,395. This has increased only marginally since ten years earlier, when it was 5,313 people at the 2011 census.

The demographic breakdown shows that people in Wingham are generally older, with a median age of 47 compared to the national median of 38 years. 86.4% were born in Australia, higher than the national figure of 66.9%. The next most common countries of birth were England (2.2%) and New Zealand (0.8%). 7.3% identified as Aboriginal and/or Torres Strait Islander. The question about religion is optional, and 7.6% did not answer it. The most common response was "No Religion" (38.6%), followed by Anglican (25.0%) and Catholic (13.7%).

== Annual events ==
- Wingham Summertime Rodeo. Events include rodeo, bucking horses, saddlebronc, rodeo clowns, and bucking bulls. First week in January.
- Wingham Show held annually at Wingham Showground.
- Wingham Beef Week, is a show specifically geared to accommodate both schools and studs. Competitions include Junior judging, parading, hoof and hook, unled carcase, Weebollabolla shorthorn and Manildra group school steer competition. With around 150 head of cattle and 400 participants this is one of the largest shows off its kind on NSW. WBW traditionally begin the day after mother's Day in mid May.
- Bonnie Wingham Scottish Festival usually held first weekend in June.
- Wingham Campdraft at Wingham Showgrounds, first week in November.
- Wingham Music Festival, formerly known as Wingham Akoostik Festival is held in Wingham Showground every third weekend in October. Originally in 2007, it started in Wingham Central Park before moving to a larger venue in 2015 and presents various genres of music.
