= Taree =

Town in New South Wales, Australia

- Town
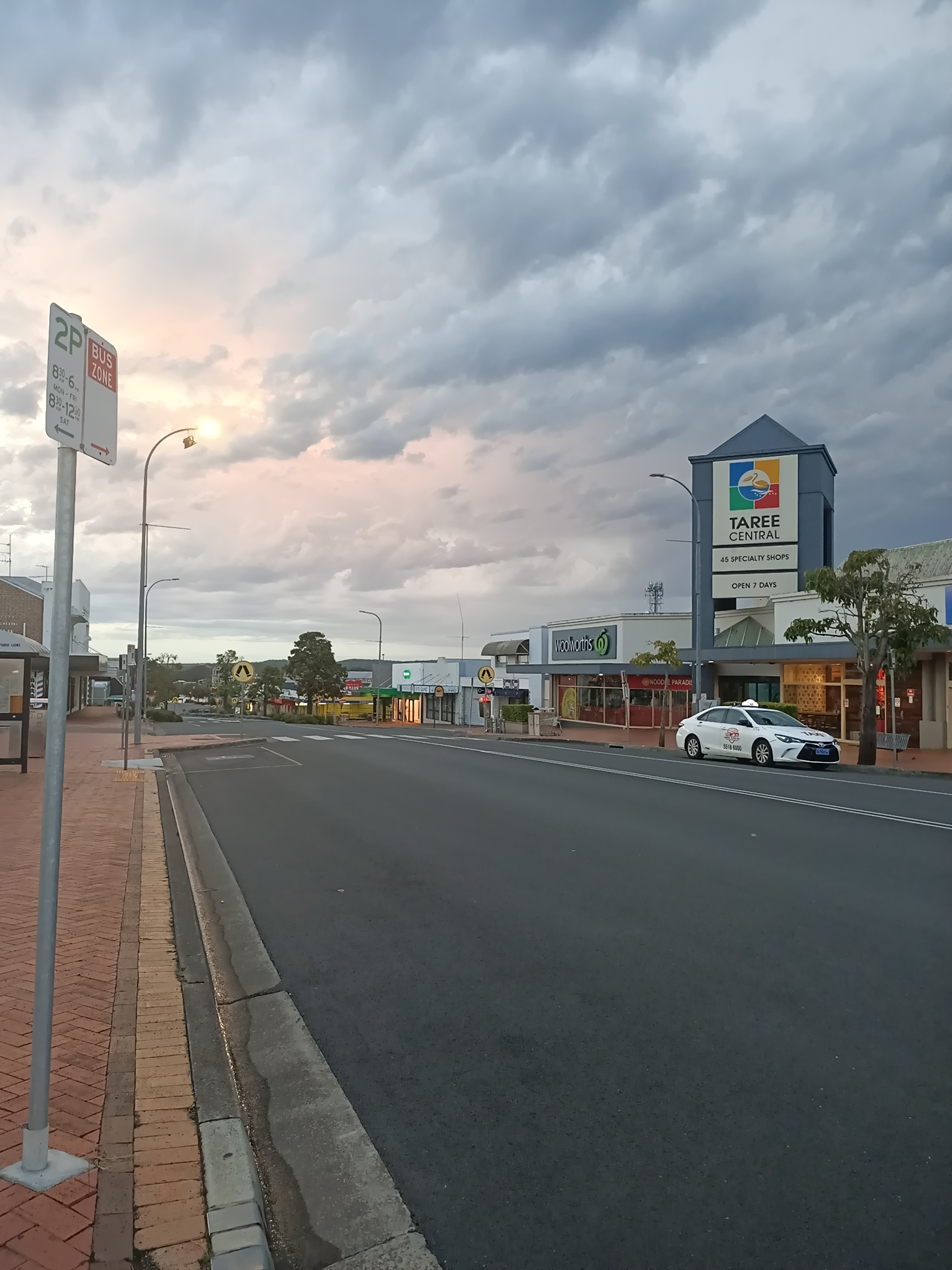
- Street view of Taree central business district with Taree Central mall visible in the background

- Coordinates: 31°54′0″S 152°27′0″E
- Country: Australia
- State: New South Wales
- LGA: MidCoast Council
- Location: 317 km (197 mi) NE of Sydney; 606 km (377 mi) S of Brisbane; 81 km (50 mi) SSW of Port Macquarie; 69 km (43 mi) SSW of Wauchope; 37 km (23 mi) N of Forster
- Established: 1831

Government
  - State electorate: Myall Lakes
  - Federal division: Lyne
- Elevation: 5 m (16 ft)

Population
  - Total: 16,715 (2021)
- Postcode: 2430
- Mean max temp: 24.3 °C (75.7 °F)
- Mean min temp: 12.0 °C (53.6 °F)
- Annual rainfall: 1,174.9 mm (46.26 in)

Taree (/tɑːriː/) is a town on the Mid North Coast, New South Wales, Australia. It and nearby Cundletown were settled in 1831 by William Wynter. Since then it has grown to a population of 16,715, and commands a significant agricultural district. Situated on a floodplain by the Manning River, it is 16 km from the Tasman Sea coast, and 317 km north of Sydney.

Taree is within the local government area of Mid-Coast Council, the state electorate of Myall Lakes and the federal electorate of Lyne.

== Name ==
The name Taree is derived from "tareebit", a Biripi word meaning tree by the river, or more specifically, the sandpaper fig (Ficus coronata).

== History ==
The Biripi are the Indigenous people of what is now known as Taree. The Aboriginal population of the Manning River was relatively dense before colonisation by Europeans.

In 1826, Assistant Surveyor Henry Dangar was instructed by John Oxley as Surveyor General (and a shareholder in the Australian Agricultural Company) to survey the land between Port Stephens and the Hastings River. During this expedition, Dangar identified that Harrington Lake was a river with two entrances to the sea. Later in 1826, the river was named the Manning River by Robert Dawson for the Deputy Governor of the Australian Agricultural Company, William Manning.

In 1829, Governor Darling proclaimed the division of the settlement of the colony of New South Wales into Nineteen Counties. The northern limit of the settlement was declared to be the Manning River.

Taree was laid out as a private town in 1854 by Henry Flett, the son-in-law of William Wynter who had originally settled the area in 1831. 100 acres (40 ha) had been set aside for the private township and 40 lots were initially sold. Taree was declared a municipality on 26 March 1885 and the first municipal council was elected by the residents.

In the early 1800s the road from Newcastle to Port Macquarie came via Gloucester and forded the river near Wingham. Boats could not go further upstream than this due to narrowing of the river and rapids. Hence a town formed at Wingham, about a day's ride from Gloucester.

Timber getting, especially cedar, ensured goods were brought to Wingham and then shipped to Newcastle and beyond by boat. Coopernook similarly formed a local shipping hub. In 1844, the government of New South Wales had established Wingham as its administrative centre. When the North Coast railway line came through in 1913, it initially terminated at Taree.

Even before the rest of the line was completed it became apparent that it was safer to send goods by rail to Newcastle and Sydney rather than hazarding the bar at the outlet to the river at Harrington where many ships had been lost. Although connected to the railway, sea transport continued to dominate along the North Coast until the 1930s. This changed when the Martin Bridge replaced the ferry across the Manning River in 1940. River traffic significantly reduced after this, ensuring Taree's place as the centre of business.

The oldest surviving building in Taree is the old St Paul's Presbyterian Church, built-in 1869 in the Victorian Gothic Revival style, next door to the current building, in Albert Street.

A record breaking rain event in March 2021 led to flooding in the town, sweeping debris such as a water tank and shipping container into the Manning River which struck the Martin Bridge. The river peaked at 5.7 m (19 ft), inundating properties in Taree South and Glenthorne and falling just short of the historical high of 6 m (20 ft) in 1929.

In the 24 hours to 9 am on 7 July 2022, a record 305 mm (12.0 in) of rain was recorded in town. Since records began in 1881, this was the wettest day in the history of Taree.

On 21 May 2025, the Manning River at Taree surpassed its 1929 record during a major flood.

== Heritage listings ==
Taree has a number of heritage-listed sites, including:

- Taree railway station on the North Coast railway line

== Climate ==
Taree experiences a humid subtropical climate (Köppen: Cfa, Trewartha: Cfal/Cfbl); with warm to hot, humid summers and mild to cool, short winters; and with a moderately high precipitation amount of 1,149.7 mm (45.26 in), with moderate precipitation even during its drier months. The highest temperature recorded at Taree was 45.7 °C (114.3 °F) on 12 February 2017; the lowest recorded was –4.0 °C (24.8 °F) on 14 June 2004, 14 July 2002, and 29 August 2003. The area features 102.5 clear days and 120.9 cloudy days annually.

Climate data for Taree Airport AWS (1997–2022 averages and extremes)
Month	Jan	Feb	Mar	Apr	May	Jun	Jul	Aug	Sep	Oct	Nov	Dec	Year
Record high °C (°F)	42.9 (109.2)	45.7 (114.3)	41.0 (105.8)	33.4 (92.1)	30.0 (86.0)	27.0 (80.6)	26.6 (79.9)	32.0 (89.6)	37.5 (99.5)	40.0 (104.0)	42.0 (107.6)	43.0 (109.4)	45.7 (114.3)
Mean daily maximum °C (°F)	29.0 (84.2)	28.3 (82.9)	26.8 (80.2)	24.4 (75.9)	21.5 (70.7)	18.9 (66.0)	18.7 (65.7)	20.2 (68.4)	23.1 (73.6)	24.8 (76.6)	26.1 (79.0)	27.8 (82.0)	24.1 (75.4)
Daily mean °C (°F)	23.7 (74.7)	23.3 (73.9)	21.8 (71.2)	19.0 (66.2)	15.8 (60.4)	13.5 (56.3)	12.7 (54.9)	13.5 (56.3)	16.2 (61.2)	18.4 (65.1)	20.6 (69.1)	22.3 (72.1)	18.4 (65.1)
Mean daily minimum °C (°F)	18.4 (65.1)	18.2 (64.8)	16.8 (62.2)	13.6 (56.5)	10.1 (50.2)	8.1 (46.6)	6.6 (43.9)	6.7 (44.1)	9.3 (48.7)	12.0 (53.6)	15.1 (59.2)	16.8 (62.2)	12.6 (54.8)
Record low °C (°F)	9.0 (48.2)	8.0 (46.4)	9.0 (48.2)	4.0 (39.2)	−0.6 (30.9)	−4.0 (24.8)	−4.0 (24.8)	−4.0 (24.8)	−2.0 (28.4)	3.0 (37.4)	5.0 (41.0)	8.1 (46.6)	−4.0 (24.8)
Average rainfall mm (inches)	94.8 (3.73)	156.1 (6.15)	198.7 (7.82)	98.3 (3.87)	80.5 (3.17)	100.3 (3.95)	51.1 (2.01)	46.1 (1.81)	45.8 (1.80)	78.1 (3.07)	109.0 (4.29)	90.9 (3.58)	1,149.7 (45.25)
Average precipitation days (≥ 1.0 mm)	9.4	10.3	10.7	9.7	7.6	8.7	6.2	5.4	5.9	7.6	10.0	9.1	100.6
Average afternoon relative humidity (%)	60	63	62	62	58	59	56	50	53	55	62	60	58
Average dew point °C (°F)	18.2 (64.8)	18.7 (65.7)	17.4 (63.3)	14.7 (58.5)	11.0 (51.8)	9.0 (48.2)	7.5 (45.5)	7.2 (45.0)	10.0 (50.0)	12.0 (53.6)	15.1 (59.2)	16.6 (61.9)	13.1 (55.6)
Source: Bureau of Meteorology (temperature, precipitation, humidity) (1997–present normals and extremes)

== Demographics ==
Historical population
Year	Pop.	±%
1911	1,539	—
1921	1,765	+14.7%
1933	4,581	+159.5%
1947	5,423	+18.4%
1954	7,408	+36.6%
1961	10,050	+35.7%
1966	10,560	+5.1%
1971	11,493	+8.8%
1976	13,440	+16.9%
1981	14,697	+9.4%
1986	15,994	+8.8%
1991	16,303	+1.9%
1996	16,702	+2.4%
2001	16,621	−0.5%
2006	16,517	−0.6%
2011	15,848	−4.1%
2016	16,197	+2.2%
2021	16,715	+3.2%
Source: Australian Bureau of Statistics data. (Note: Some of the population numbers may be higher as they use Urban Centre and Locality statistical areas as some census years did not include smaller statistical areas in their publications, and so they may not match with official town boundaries)

In the 2021 census, there were 16,715 people in Taree.

Age

The median age in Taree is 45, compared to the national median of 38. Taree has a higher proportion of older people, with 28.3% of people over 65 compared to a national average of 17.2%, and 4.6% of residents aged over 85, more than the national average of 2.1%.

Indigenous status

12.7% of the population identify as Aboriginal or Torres Strait Islander, with the median age amongst this group being 20.

Country of birth

82.1% of people were born in Australia, compared to the national average of 66.9%. The next most common countries of birth were England (2%), India (0.8%), the Philippines (0.8%), New Zealand (0.7%) and the Netherlands (0.3%).

Language used at home

86.8% of people spoke only English at home. Languages other than English included Malayalam (0.6%), Mandarin (0.3%), Filipino (0.3%), Punjabi (0.2%) and Nepali (0.2%)

Religious affiliation

The most common response for religious affiliation was No Religion (36.1%), followed by Anglican (20.5%), Catholic (15.2%) and Uniting Church (4.1%).

Employment status

Among the residents of Taree, 46.9% worked full-time, 37.4% worked part-time. The unemployment rate is 9.3%, more than the national rate of 5.1%.

Industry of employment

The most common industries of employment were hospitals (6.8%), aged care residential services (6.1%), other social assistance services (5%), supermarket and grocery stores (4.4%), and takeaway food services (3.6%).

Household income

The median weekly household income is $968. This compares with a national average of $1,746. 30.3% of households had a gross weekly income of less than $650, which is higher than the national average of 16.5%.

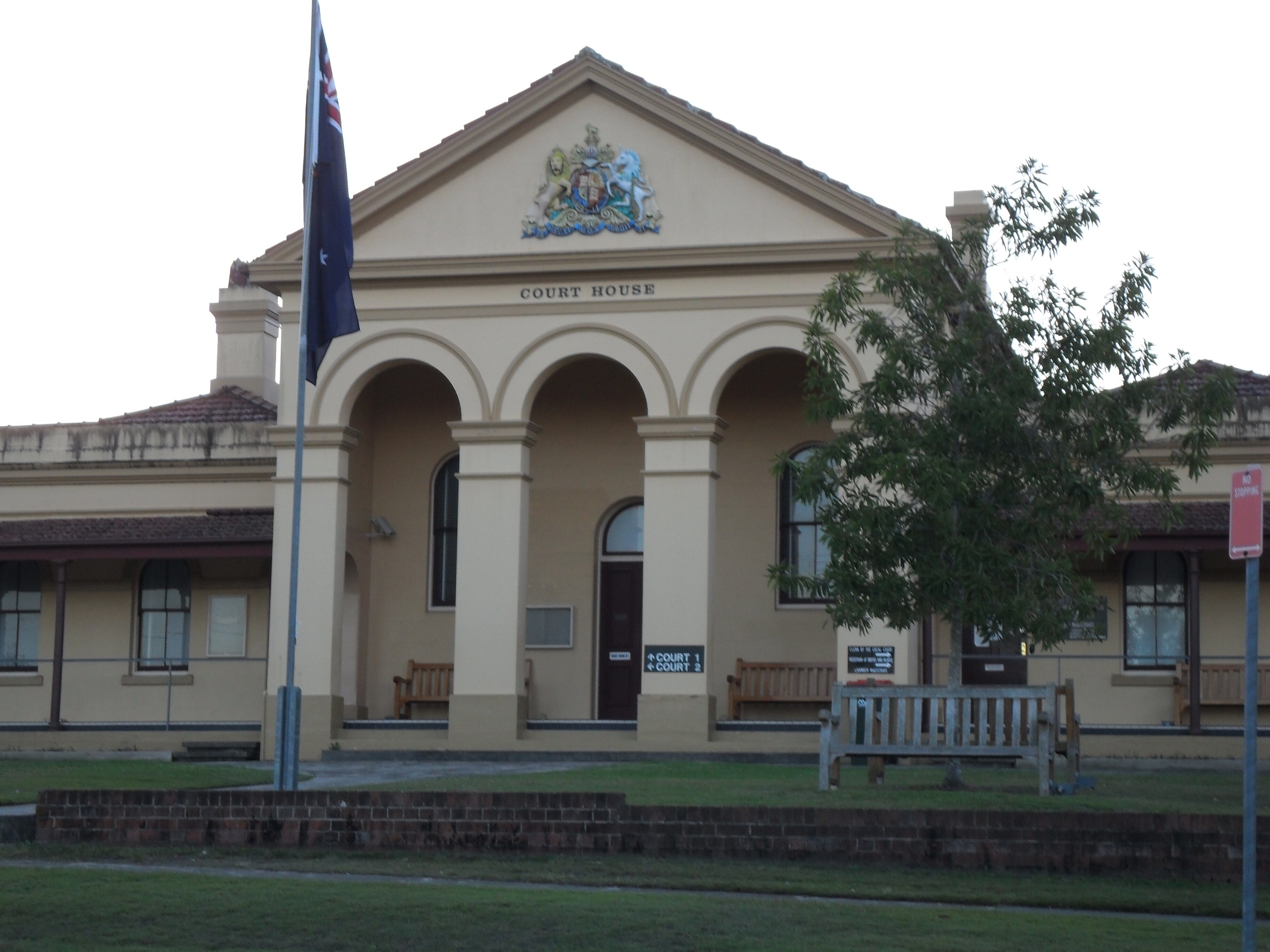
Taree Courthouse

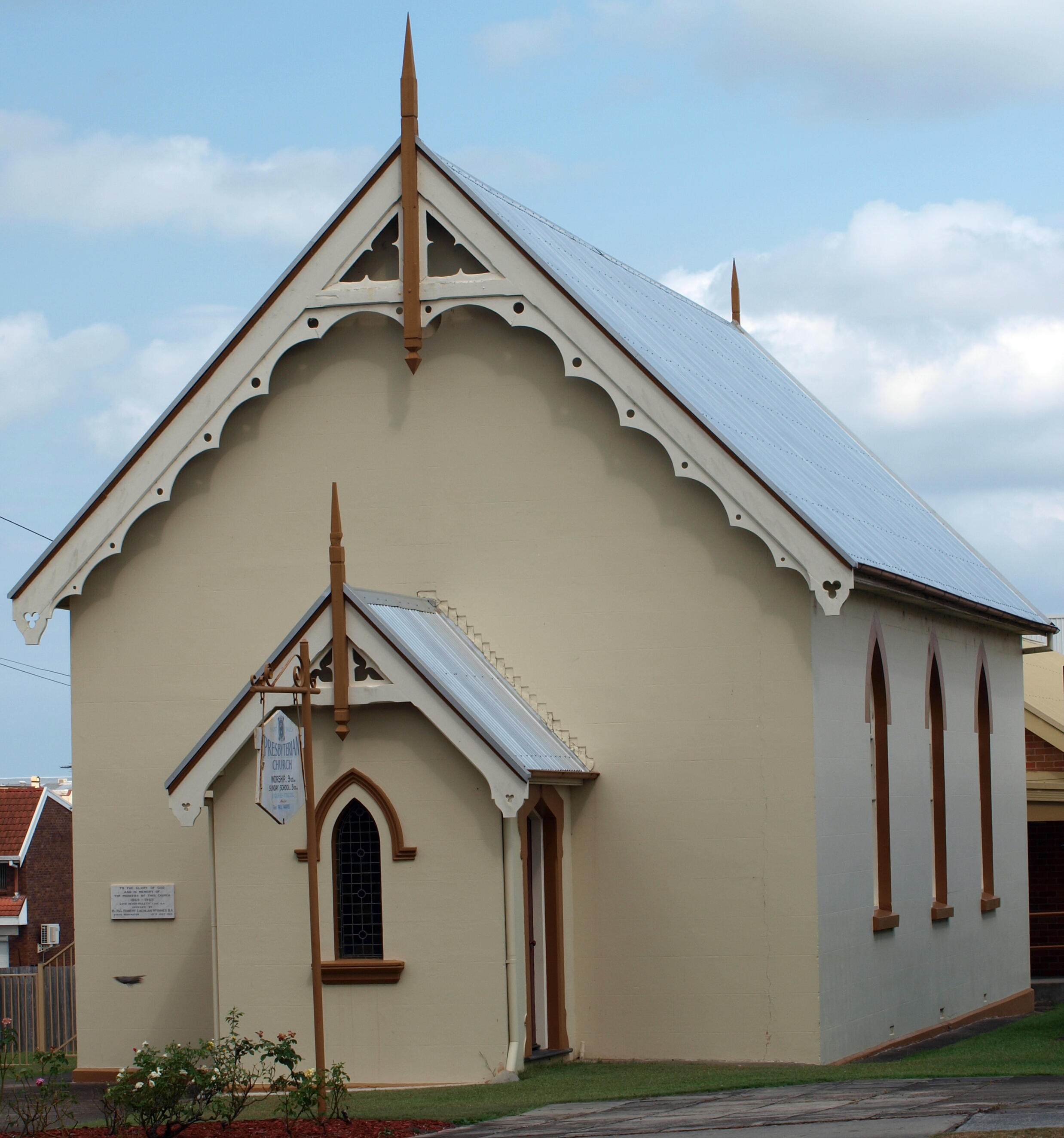
The old St Paul's Presbyterian Church.

== Transport ==
Taree is located on the Pacific Highway. Taree railway station on the North Coast line is served by NSW TrainLink services from Sydney to Grafton, Casino and Roma Street.

Taree Airport was served by FlyPelican services to Sydney until July 2022.

== Education ==
There are several public schools in the Taree area including Taree Public School, Taree High School, Taree West Public School, Manning Gardens Public School, Chatham Public School, Chatham High School, and Cundletown Public School.

Private schools in and around Taree include Manning District Adventist School, Tinonee, Manning Valley Anglican College, Cundletown, Midcoast Christian College, Kolodong, St Joseph's Primary School, and St Clare's High School.

Several post-secondary education and training facilities have a presence in Taree: the North Coast Institute of TAFE, Taree Community College, the Australian Technical College – Manning Valley Campus.

== Media ==
=== Newspapers ===
The Manning River Times is based in Taree.

=== Television ===
All major digital-only television channels are available in Taree. The networks and the channels they broadcast are listed as follows:

- Seven (formerly Prime7 and Prime Television), 7two, 7mate, 7Bravo, 7flix. Seven Network owned and operated station channels.
- Nine (NBN), 9Go!, 9Gem and 9Life. Nine Network affiliated channels, owned by WIN Corporation.
- 10, 10 Drama, 10 Comedy and Nickelodeon. Network 10 owned and operated station channels.
- ABC, ABC Family, ABC Kids, ABC Entertains and ABC News, part of the Australian Broadcasting Corporation.
- SBS, SBS2, SBS World Movies, SBS WorldWatch, SBS Food and NITV, part of the Special Broadcasting Service.

Of the three main commercial networks:

- The Seven Network airs a half-hour local Seven News bulletin for the North Coast at 6 pm each weeknight. It is broadcast from studios in Canberra with reporters based at a local newsroom in the city.
- WIN Television airs NBN News, a regional half and hour-long program including opt-outs for the Mid North Coast, every weeknight at 5:30 pm. It is broadcast from studios in Newcastle with reporters based at a local newsroom in the city.
- Network 10 airs short local news updates throughout the day, broadcast from its Hobart studios.

=== Radio ===
There are four local radio stations, commercial stations 2RE and Max FM and community stations 2BOB and 2TLP.

The ABC broadcasts Triple J (96.3FM), ABC Classic (98.7FM), Radio National (97.1FM) and ABC Mid North Coast (95.5FM and 756AM) into Taree.

Rhema FM Manning Great Lakes broadcasts from studios in nearby Wingham and Racing Radio is also broadcast to Taree.

== Sport ==
The most popular sport in Taree is rugby league. The city has one team competing in the Group 3 Rugby League Premiership, the Taree City Bulls. The Old Bar Pirates and Wingham Tigers are based just outside the city in Wingham and Old Bar. The town has produced many NRL-calibre stars, most notably Latrell Mitchell and Danny Buderus.

Other sports played in the town include soccer, rugby union, tennis and cricket.

=== Rugby league teams in Taree and surrounds ===
Senior teams

- Taree City Bulls
- Wingham District Tigers
- Old Bar Pirates

Junior teams

- Taree Red Rovers (feeder club of Taree City Bulls)
- Taree Panthers (feeder club of Taree City Bulls)
- Old Bar Pirates
- Wingham District Tigers

== Tourism ==
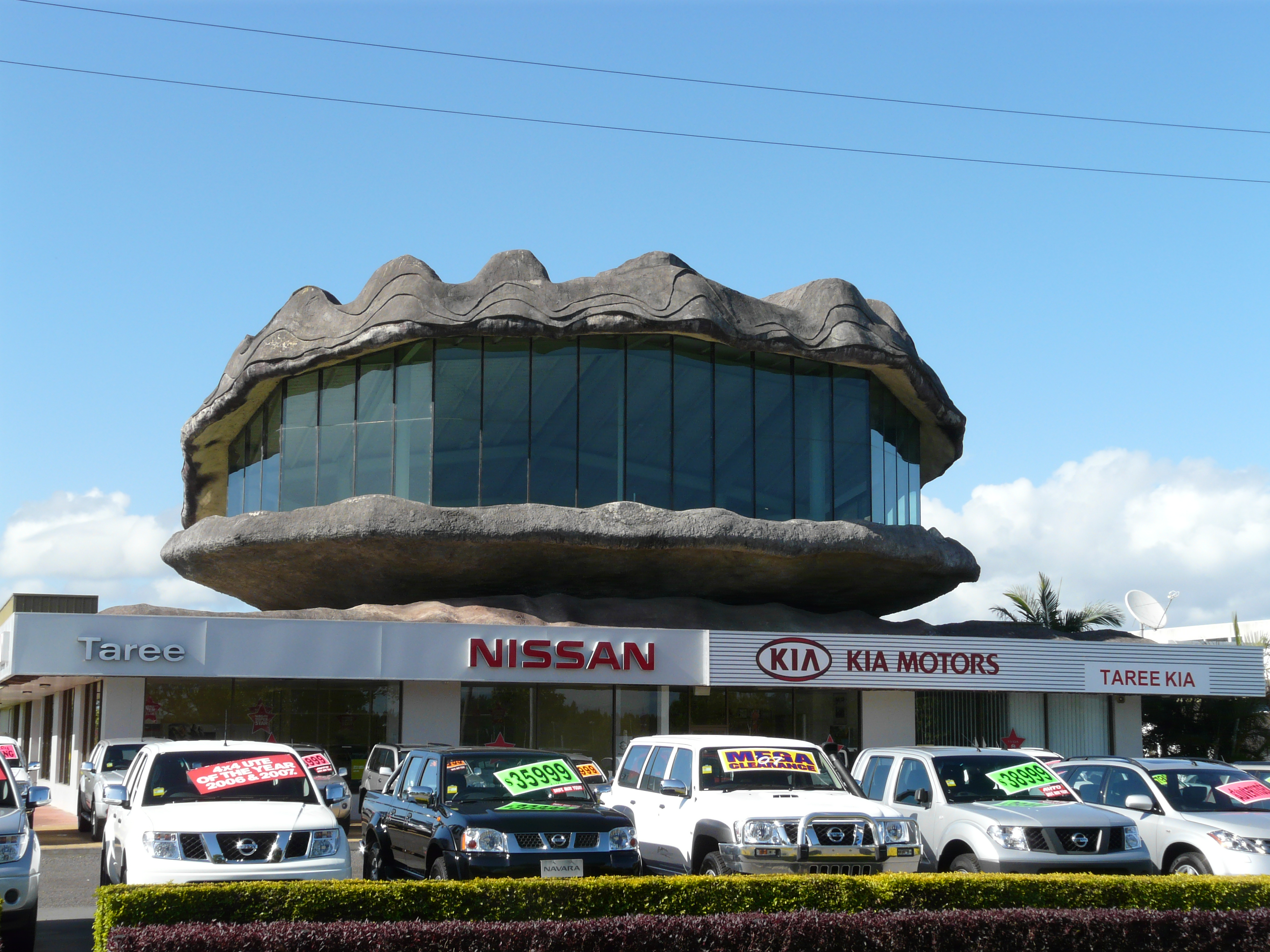
The Big Oyster

A local tourist attraction is a building called "The World's Largest Oyster", also called "The Big Oyster". Big Things are a common form of tourist attraction in Australia. Like the Big Merino and Big Banana, the 'Oyster' is an artifact based on local produce; the Manning River produced 1,752,000 oysters during 2013. The Big Oyster was an unsuccessful business venture, known to the locals as a 'Big Mistake', and is now home to a motor dealership.

The Manning Entertainment Centre was built in the 1980s as the cultural centre of the district. It seats 505 people and has previously presented artists such as the Sydney Symphony Orchestra, the Australian Ballet and Dame Joan Sutherland. Local performers, including the district eisteddfod and local amateur dramatic societies, use it to provide cultural opportunities for the local community.

Located next to the Entertainment Centre and the Visitor Information Centre at the northern entrance to Taree is the Manning Aquatic and Leisure Centre. This facility includes a 25-metre indoor heated pool with slippery dip and a 50-metre outdoor pool and soon after the time of opening had the second most expensive pool entrance fee in Australia, the most expensive being a pool in Perth, Western Australia. The Aquatic Centre was built in the late 1990s – early 2000s to replace the Taree Pool, which has been redeveloped into a public park with outdoor stage.

The Manning Regional Art Gallery is located in a cottage-style building next to Taree Public School. The art gallery hosts a changing selection of works by local artists and visiting exhibitions.

Nearby towns include historic Wingham, Tinonee, and the beachside town of Old Bar.

== Annual events ==
=== January ===
Events in the NSW Rowing Association Annual Pointscore Rowing Regatta are held at Endeavour Place in Taree during the third week of January. This Regatta runs over three days (Friday to Sunday) and consists of over 200 races with more than 500 competitors travelling from many parts of New South Wales to compete.
The Manning River Summer Festival runs throughout the month of January, incorporating the town's New Year's celebrations, a "Family Fun Day" in Queen Elizabeth Park on Australia Day, and also vide variety of cultural events.

=== March / April ===
The Easter Powerboat Classic is held on the Manning River near Queen Elizabeth Park during the Easter Long Weekend.

=== August ===
The Taree Gold Cup is a prestigious horse racing event held at the Bushland Drive Racecourse.

=== October ===
The Taree Annual Show is held the second weekend in October. It consists of a sideshow, precision driving team, rodeo events, and cattle and livestock judging.

== Notable people ==
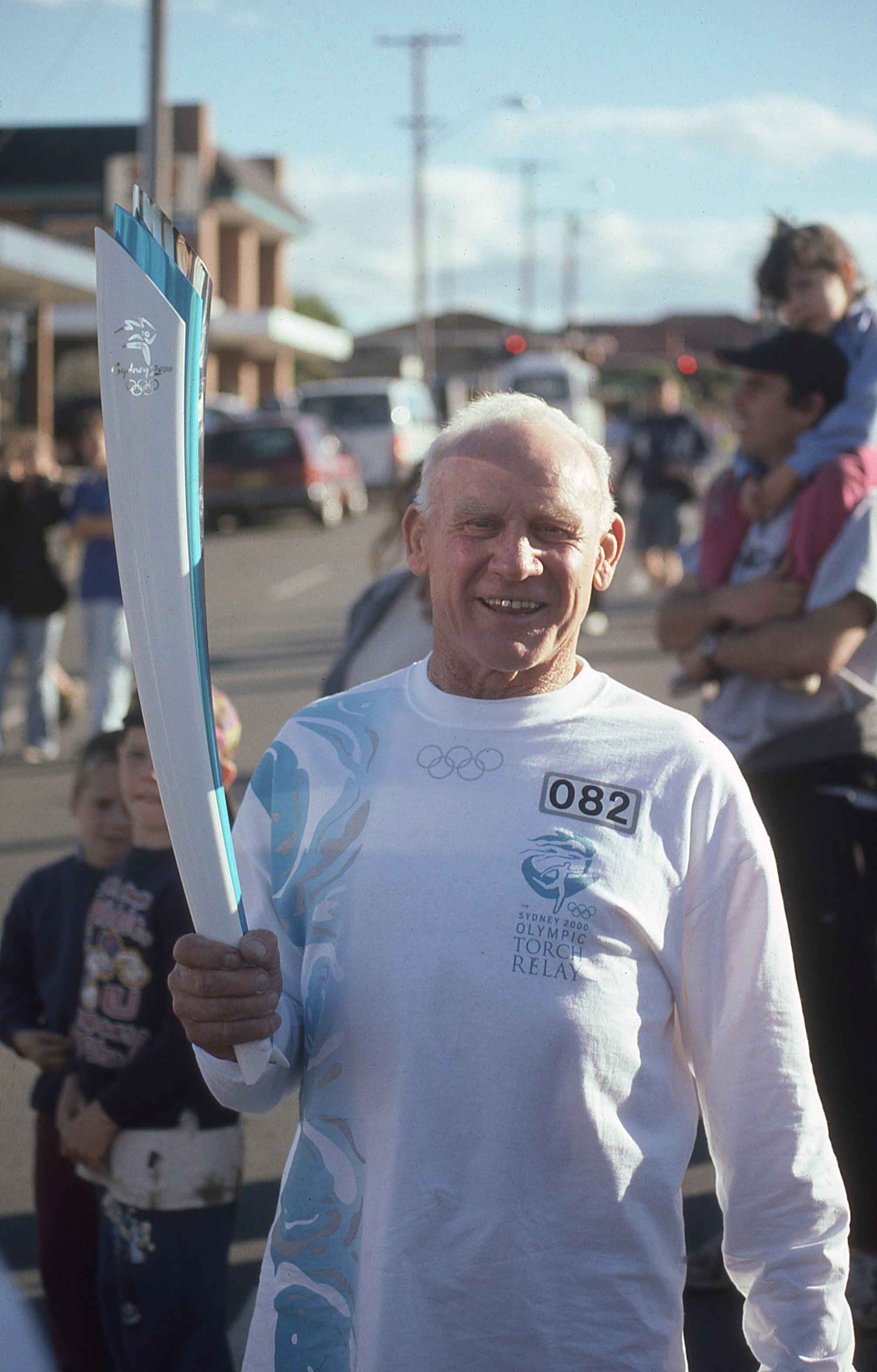
Fred Atkins carrying the Olympic Torch through Taree for the Sydney Olympic Games 2000.

Academic

- Murray Batchelor – Mathematical physicist
- John H. Coates – Mathematician
- Clem Tisdell – Economist

Arts, entertainment and media

- Sir Dick Boyer – Former Chairman of the ABC
- Liz Hayes – Television reporter
- Ian Moffitt – Journalist and author
- Leslie Allan Murray – Poet
- Amanda Thane – Operatic soprano
- Jim Frazier – Inventor and Artist

Politics and public service

- Ella Simon – Aboriginal Activist/First Aboriginal Person in Australia to be a Justice of The Peace
- Sir Leslie Boyce – British Conservative Party politician
- Bruce Cowan – Politician
- Dr Ken Henry – Former Secretary to The Treasury
- Lewis Martin – Politician
- Mark Vaile – Former Deputy Prime Minister and National Party leader

Sport

- Matt Adamson – Rugby league footballer
- Phil Adamson – Rugby league footballer
- Mitchell Barnett – Rugby league footballer
- Troy Bayliss – Professional motorcycle racer
- Aaron Bird – Cricketer
- David Boyd – Rugby league footballer
- Kasey Brown – Professional squash player
- Danny Buderus – Rugby league footballer
- Coral Buttsworth – Tennis player
- Mal Cochrane – Rugby league footballer
- Boyd Cordner – Rugby league footballer
- Damian Cudlin – Professional motorcycle racer
- Daniel Dumas – Rugby league footballer
- Scott Dureau – Rugby league footballer
- Peter Gallagher – Rugby league footballer
- Josh Graham – Rugby union and rugby league footballer
- Ben Harris – Rugby league footballer
- Joshua Hook – Professional motorcycle racer
- Leigh Marning – Rhythmic gymnast and contortionist
- Luke McKenzie – Professional Triathlete
- Latrell Mitchell – Rugby league football player
- Jarrod Mullen – Rugby league footballer
- Jade North – Soccer player
- Erin Osborne – Cricketer
- Stewart Pike – Paralympic swimmer
- Ian Ruff – Olympic medallist sailor
- Michael Sullivan – Rugby league footballer
- Adam Woolnough – Rugby league footballer
