= Tapin Tops National Park =

National park in New South Wales, Australia

- IUCN category II (national park)
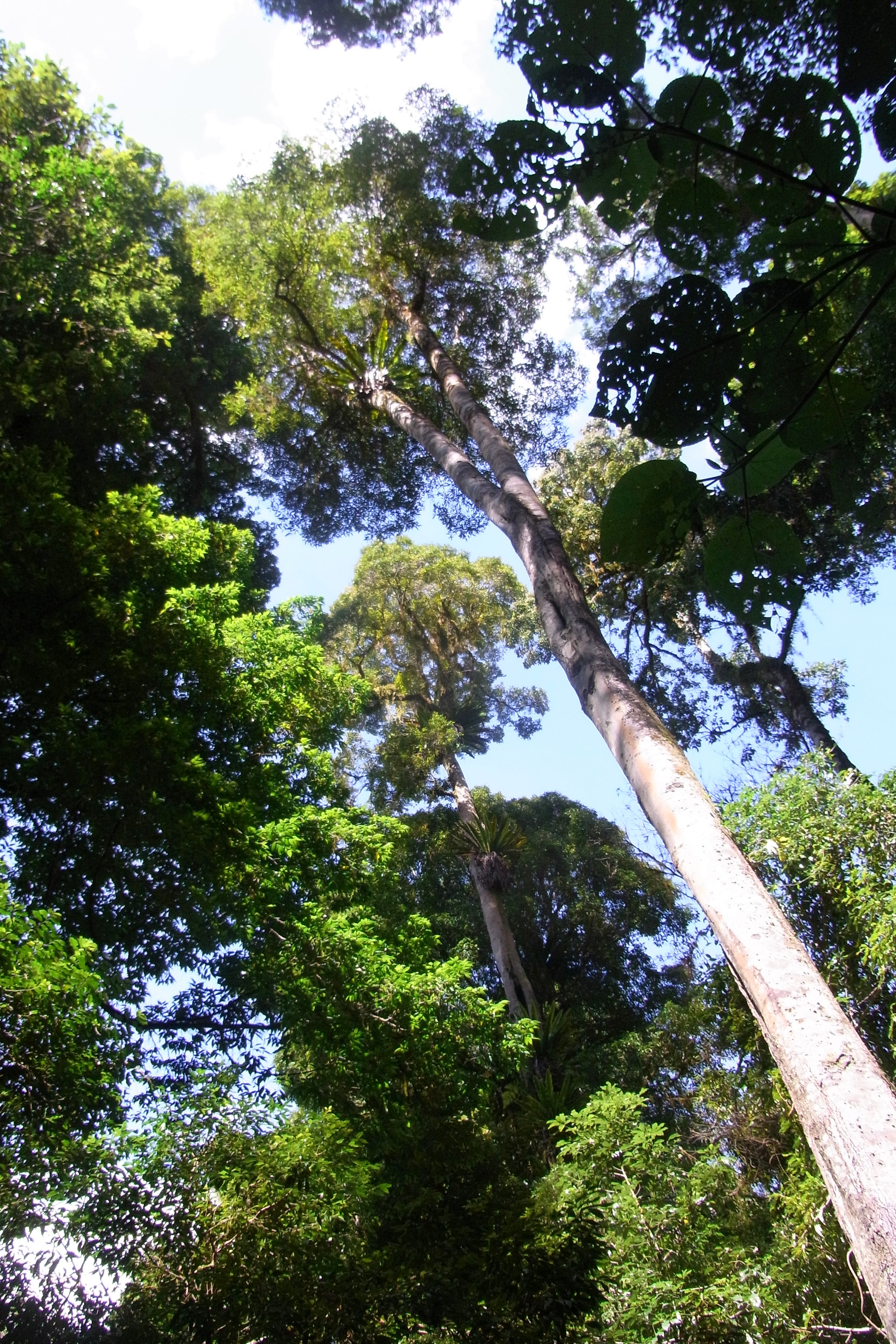
- rainforest at Tapin Tops National Park

- Location within New South Wales
- Location: New South Wales
- Nearest city: Wingham
- Coordinates: 31°39′49″S 152°11′13″E
- Area: 110 km^{2} (42 sq mi)
- Established: 1999
- Governing body: NSW National Parks & Wildlife Service
- Website: Official website

Tapin Tops National Park (Worimi: Dapin or Dapit) is a 110 km^{2} (42 sq mi) national park in the Mid North Coast region of New South Wales, Australia.

== Location and features ==
The Tapin Tops National Park is situated approximately 264 kilometres (164 mi) northeast of Sydney, with the closest town being Wingham. Access to the park from Wingham is reached via Elands Road, Wherrol Flat Road, Dingo Tops Road and Knodingbul Road, generally unsealed roads accessible via 2WD vehicles. The park is bounded by the Bulga, Knorrit, and Dingo state forests to the north, south, and southwest respectively, and by Killabakh nature reserve to the east.

Within the park are a number of threatened species including the common and little bent-wing bat and greater broad-nosed bat, the spotted-tailed quoll, the koala, the Parma wallaby, the red-legged pademelon, the glossy black cockatoo, the wompoo fruit dove, and the powerful owl. Threats to these species habitat led to a blockade of logging in the Dingo and Bulgar Forests in 1993, sections of which were added to the park.

Scenic lookouts such as Rowley's Peak provide panoramic views via a platform with a 360–degree view, across Taree and the Tasman Sea to the east, the catchment area of Caparra Creek to the southeast, and the extensive forested hinterland toward Nowendoc in the west. The platform has an estimated elevation of 1,000 metres (3,300 ft) AHD.

Mountain Brush circuit is a 15-minute walk through a rainforest which contain red cedar and coachwood, brush box, soft corkwood and the yellow carabeen.

Camping is permitted in the Dingo Tops campground. A walking track from Potoroo Falls picnic area can be accessed alongside the Little Run Creek to view Potoroo Falls, approximately 1 kilometre (0.62 mi) upstream. Several swimming holes are also located in the area.

Parts of the Rowleys and Nowendoc rivers and the Dingo and Bobin creeks lie within the Tapin Tops National Park.

== Etymology ==
The traditional custodians of the land now containing the Tapin Tops National Park are the Australian Aboriginal Birpai people of the Bundjalung nation. Tapin is the Aboriginal Kattang word meaning dingo, a subspecies of the grey wolf.

== See also ==
- Protected areas of New South Wales
