= Bohnock =

Rural locality in Australia state

- Town
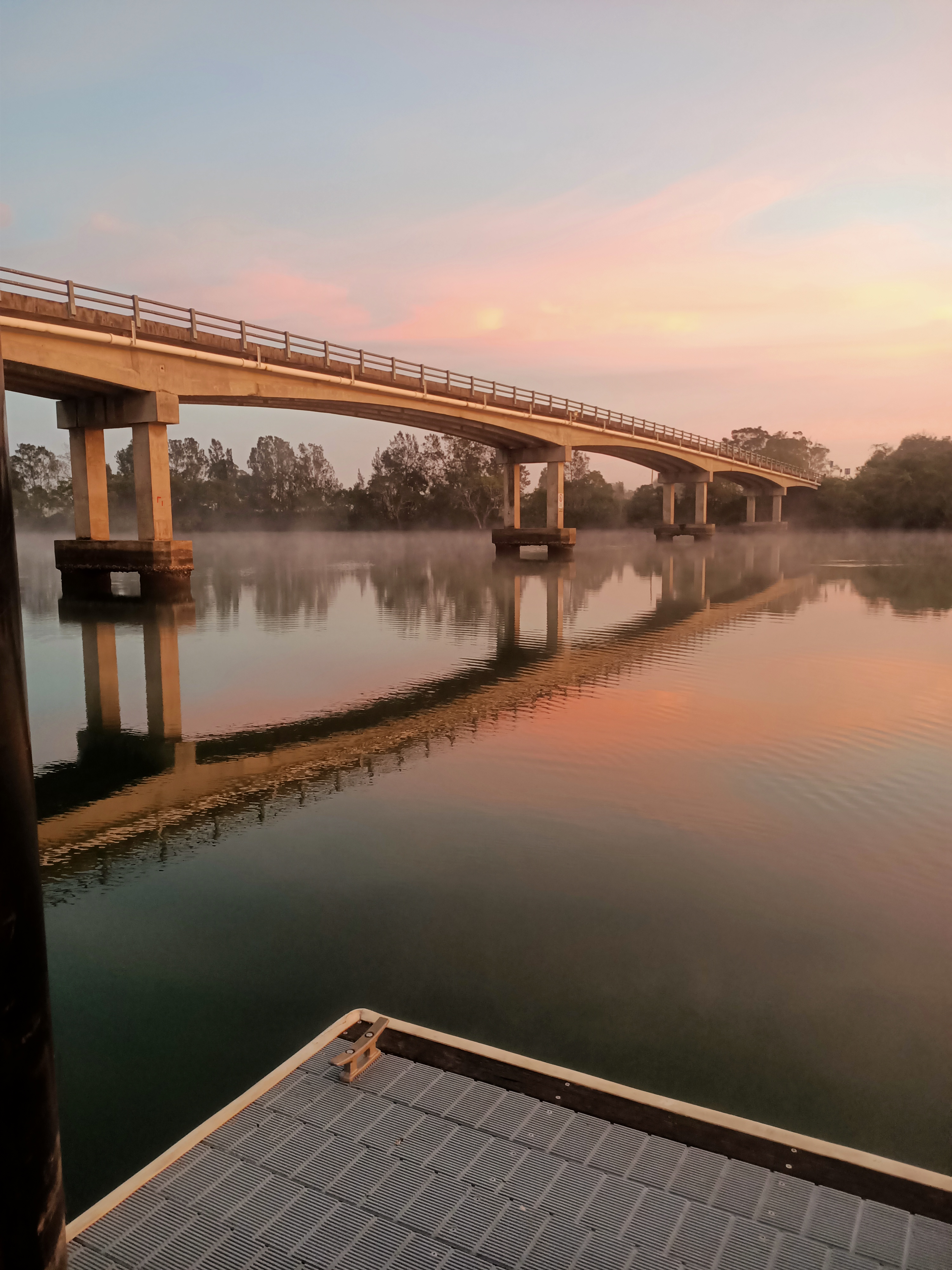
- Neville Weiley Bridge at Bohnock, seen from the boat ramp jetty

- Coordinates: 31.948389°S 152.567778°E
- Country: Australia
- State: New South Wales
- LGA: Mid-Coast Council
- Location: 320 km (200 mi) NE of Sydney; 16 km (9.9 mi) ESE of Taree; 6 km (3.7 mi) E of Old Bar

Government
  - State electorate: Myall Lakes
  - Federal division: Lyne

Population
  - Total: 83 (2021 census)
- Postcode: 2430
Localities around Bohnock
Dumaresq Island	Oxley Island	Mitchells Island
Pampoolah	Bohnock	Cabbage Tree Island
Saltwater	Old Bar	Old Bar

Bohnock is a small rural locality in the Mid North Coast region of New South Wales, Australia, within the MidCoast Council local government area. It is situated on the southern channel of the Manning River and provides access to the river via a public boat ramp. The locality is sparsely populated and is primarily rural in character, with limited commercial or urban development. It lies approximately 6 km west of the beachside town of Old Bar and approximately 16 km south-east of the regional centre of Taree.

== Etymology ==
According to the Midcoast Council, the origin of the name Bohnock is unclear despite extensive historical research. One theory is that the name came from the Indigenous language and is said to mean "big oyster". Originally the name "Bohnock" was applied to a much larger parish area.

== History ==
The Manning River region, including the area now known as Bohnock, was originally inhabited by the Biripi and Worimi Aboriginal people. Historical maps from the National Library of Australia show that "Bohnock" was used as a parish name within the County of Gloucester in the mid-twentieth century. The name was applied to a larger administrative area than the present-day locality.

Bohnock contains the Neville Weiley Bridge, which crosses the Manning River and was opened in 1958. It is named after Neville Weiley, a farmer and local councillor, who advocated for its construction. It was the first bridge in the region to connect the islands of the Manning River delta to the mainland, replacing earlier punt-based transport.

== Demographics ==
According to the 2021 Australian Census, Bohnock had a population of 83 people, with a median age of 52 years (41.2% male and 58.7% female). The median weekly household income was A$1,625, and there were 30 private dwellings with an average of 2.8 people per household and 2.9 motor vehicles per dwelling.

== Facilities ==
Bohnock has a bait and tackle shop, as well as Bohnock Boat Ramp Reserve, both located on Channel Close adjacent to the Neville Weiley Bridge crossing the Manning River. The reserve is managed by the MidCoast Council and provides public access to the river via a boat ramp. It also features a concrete jetty, a fish-cleaning table, car parking, and lighting.
