= Dingo Creek =

Coordinates: 31°40′S 152°19′E

Dingo Creek Eastern Branch Dingo Creek
- Location of mouth in NSW
- Etymology: Derived from the Aboriginal Kattang word tapin, meaning dingo

Location
- Country: Australia
- State: New South Wales
- Region: NSW North Coast (IBRA), Mid North Coast
- Municipality: Greater Taree

Physical characteristics
- Source: Mount Gibraltar, Comboyne Plateau
  - location: north of Wingham
  - elevation: 693 m (2,274 ft)
- Mouth: confluence with the Manning River
  - location: at Kilawarra, west of Wingham
  - elevation: 14 m (46 ft)
- Length: 78 km (48 mi)

Basin features
- River system: Manning River catchment
- Tributaries
  - right: Bobin Creek, Caparra Creek

Dingo Creek, a perennial stream of the Manning River catchment, is located in the Mid North Coast region of New South Wales, Australia.

== Course and features ==
The Dingo Creek rises below the Comboyne Plateau, about 1.6 kilometres (0.99 mi) southwest of Mount Gibraltar within the Killabakh Nature Reserve, north of the town of Wingham. The river flows generally west to a point east of Tapin Tops National Park, then south, joined by the Bobin and Caparra creeks, before reaching its confluence with the Manning River, at Kilawarra, west of Wingham. The river descends 679 metres (2,228 ft) over its 78 kilometres (48 mi) course.

The Manning River eventually flows into the Tasman Sea through a minor delta east of Taree.

== Etymology ==
The traditional custodians of the land surrounding the Dingo Creek are the Australian Aboriginal Biripi people. The name of the creek is derived from the Aboriginal Gathang word tapin, meaning dingo, a subspecies of the grey wolf.

== See also ==
- List of rivers of Australia
- List of rivers in New South Wales (A-K)
- Rivers of New South Wales
