= Croki, New South Wales =

Locality in New South Wales, Australia

- Town
- View across the Manning River towards Mitchells Island from Croki Reserve.

- Coordinates: 31°52′36″S 152°35′38″E
- Country: Australia
- State: New South Wales
- LGA: Mid-Coast Council
- Location: 320 km (200 mi) NE of Sydney; 13 km (8.1 mi) NW of Taree; 580 km (360 mi) S of Brisbane; 78 km (48 mi) SW of Port Macquarie; 46 km (29 mi) N of Forster
- Established: 1830s

Government
  - State electorate: Myall Lakes
  - Federal division: Lyne

Population
  - Total: 34 (2021 census)
- Postcode: 2430
Localities around Croki, New South Wales
Moto	Coopernook	Harrington
Kindee Kundle	Croki, New South Wales	Mitchells Island
Ghinni Ghinni	Oxley Island	Mitchells Island

Croki is a small rural village situated on Jones Island in the Mid North Coast region of New South Wales, Australia. It is within the MidCoast Council local government area.

== History ==
In the 1830s, Croki was one of the major river shipping points in the Manning region, supporting regular boat traffic that transported agricultural produce to larger centres such as Taree and Sydney. Croki's importance as a river port declined significantly following the opening of the North Coast railway line in 1913. Subsequent improvements to road infrastructure further reduced reliance on river-based transport. By the 21st century, Croki had become a small rural locality with the 2016 Australian census recording a population of 43.

== Geography ==
Croki is located on Jones Island in the Manning River estuary system, approximately 13 km upstream from the Manning Point entrance, measured along the river. The area consists mainly of dairy farmland and riverine landscape. It is situated on the low-lying Manning River floodplain and has been affected by periodic flooding throughout its history.

== Demographics ==
The 2021 census recorded Croki's population to have 34 people, of whom 40.5% were male and 59.5% were female. The median age was 61. There were 13 families and 22 private dwellings, with an average household size of 2.1 people, and the median weekly household income was $1,208.

== Amenities ==
Croki Reserve is a public recreation area on Barton Street, on the banks of the Manning River. It includes a netted swimming area and provides facilities for picnicking, as well as access to the river for boating and fishing.

Panoramic view of Croki Reserve, November 2026
