= Mitchell High School (New South Wales) =

School in Australia

Location
- 52 Keyworth Drive; Blacktown, western Sydney, 2148; Australia; 33°47′S 150°54′E

Information
- Type: Government-funded High school Co-educational
- Established: 1964; 62 years ago
- Status: Open
- Educational authority: NSW Department of Education
- School code: 8403
- Principal: Elena Marinis
- Staff: ~103, as of August 2019
- Years: 7–12
- Website: mitchell-h.schools.nsw.gov.au

Mitchell High School (abbreviated as MHS), established in 1964, is a coeducational government high school located in the suburb of Blacktown, in western Sydney. Mitchell has a proud Rugby Union tradition.

The school provides public education to students from years 7 to 12. It prepares students for the Higher School Certificate (HSC) in Year 12 and the Record of School Achievement (RoSA) for those students who wish to leave school before obtaining the HSC. The school celebrated its 50th anniversary in April 2014.

== History ==
=== Proposal ===
On 3 June 1962, a new school was proposed in the Blacktown South region due to the rising population demands in Western Sydney. At the time of the proposal, only three government schools existed in the area – Blacktown Boys High School, Blacktown Girls High School and Seven Hills High School.

=== Construction ===
==== Planning ====
The school's development was divided into two sections, referred to as stage 1 and stage 2 which both included construction of the main classroom blocks: A, B, C, and D. The final sections in developing the school not included in the initial two stages were building block E, the school hall, and the current dedicated school administration office.

==== Building ====
The landscape, which the school was provided, totalled 6.3 hectares in area, which equated to a final cost of approximately £332,850 ($665,700), which also included the development of stage 1 and stage 2. The two initial stages were completed on 10 June 1964 and the students and staff expected to attend Mitchell High School were moved out of the temporary classes at a school on Hereward Highway and at Blacktown Boys High School and Blacktown Girls High School respectively that they had started the year in. Mr Frank Doyle became the first principal of the school.

===== E block, school hall, and school administration office =====
Following the initial construction stages, E block was later completed in 1966 at a price of £90,738 ($181,476). The school hall was then opened on 23 December 1975, and then the current administration office was opened on 5 August 1993, moving out of the current location of the school library. There has since been a renovation of the administration building in late 2024 and finished early 2025

===== D block floor change =====
Due to the relocation of the administration office in 1993, the lower floor of the original D block was completely changed. The original foyer to the school became a performance space for dance and drama and consequently the embedded brass and marble school crest, which had been donated to the school by Mr Joseph Zarb, the original builder, was covered by the new dance flooring. A photograph of the covered marble crest currently hangs in the waiting room at the school administration office. This also resulted in the library being extended and allowed for space for more classrooms.
