= Rowleys River =

River in New South Wales, Australia

Coordinates: 31°45′S 152°04′E

Rowleys River Number Two River

Location
- Country: Australia
- State: New South Wales
- IBRA: New England Tablelands, NSW North Coast
- District: Northern Tablelands, Mid North Coast
- Local government areas: Walcha, Port Macquarie-Hastings

Physical characteristics
- Source: Great Dividing Range
  - location: southeast of Yarrowitch
  - elevation: 984 m (3,228 ft)
- Mouth: confluence with the Nowendoc River
  - location: southeast of Nowendoc
  - elevation: 335 m (1,099 ft)
- Length: 21 km (13 mi)

Basin features
- River system: Manning River catchment
- Tributaries
  - left: Cells River
  - right: Burns Creek
- National parks: Mummel Gulf, Cottan-Bimbang, Tapin Tops

Rowleys River, a perennial river of the Manning River catchment, is located in the Northern Tablelands and Mid North Coast districts of New South Wales, Australia.

== Course and features ==
Rowleys River rises on the eastern slopes of the Great Dividing Range, southeast of Yarrowitch, and flows generally south southeast, joined by two tributaries including the Cells River, before reaching its confluence with the Nowendoc River, southeast of Nowendoc. The river descends 864 metres (2,835 ft) over its 71 kilometres (44 mi) course.

== See also ==
- Rivers of New South Wales
- List of rivers of New South Wales (L–Z)
- List of rivers of Australia
