= Mitchells Island =

Island in New South Wales, Australia

- Part of Mitchells Island viewed across the Manning River from Croki Wharf.
- Interactive map of Mitchells Island

Geography
- Location: Manning River
- Coordinates: 31°54′00″S 152°37′00″E
- Area: 129.5 km^{2} (50.0 sq mi)
- Highest elevation: 151 m (495 ft)

Administration
- Australia
- State: New South Wales

Demographics
- Population: 462 (2021)

Mitchells Island is the largest of several islands in the mouth of the Manning River in New South Wales, Australia. It is roughly triangular in shape and has an area of approximately 130 km^{2} (50 sq mi).

== Geography ==
The island is bordered on the north by the main channel of the Manning River, on the southwest by Scotts Creek, and on the east by the Pacific Ocean. The ocean-facing coastline extends from Old Bar in the south to Harrington in the north.

Mitchells Island ranges in elevation from sea level to 151 m (495 ft). It and the adjacent Oxley Island are shale outcrops rather than sandy deposits.

== History ==
The island is named after Thomas Livingstone Mitchell (1792–1855), who served as Surveyor-General for Australia.

St. Mark's Church was built in 1872, with its first service on 6 June that year. According to local legend, the Church was built from a large cedar log washed downstream from a timber mill during floods. Its cemetery is on the highest point of the Island, overlooking the river towards the Little Brother mountain ranges.

== Population and settlement ==
According to the 2021 census, Mitchells Island had 462 residents.

Much of the island was formerly covered by dairy farms but only one remains today. The housing estate Manning Waters was developed in 1991 with two houses, and has since grown to 36 homes.

The island's only village is Manning Point, approximately 330 km (210 mi) north of Sydney. Besides the holiday rental units, the village has a general store, a bowling club, the two caravan parks, a cafe, and a bait shop. The general store is also the news agent, the video rental shop, the Australia Post Office, the bottle shop, the burger and fish and chips grill, and the grocery store.

== Environment ==
Mitchells Island largely consists of dense rainforest, home to many native animals including koalas, echidnas, wallabies, possums, bandicoots, quolls, goannas and various bird species.

== Recreation and tourism ==
The island is a popular holiday location and has two caravan parks and many rental homes and units.

The Pacific Ocean forms the eastern border of the island. While the entire length is a sand beach, there are two accesses. The northern access is from the village of Manning Point and is reinforced to allow four-wheel drive vehicle access. The southern access is from Beach Road and has no vehicular access and is pedestrian access only. This access is blocked to vehicles and is a narrow pedestrian path over the boundary dune. Neither beach is patrolled.
