= Burns Creek =

Coordinates: 31°22′S 152°53′E

Location
- Country: Australia
- State: New South Wales
- Region: New England Tablelands (IBRA), Northern Tablelands
- Local government area: Walcha

Physical characteristics
- Source: Great Dividing Range
  - location: near Dicks Hut
  - elevation: 984 m (3,228 ft)
- Mouth: confluence with the Rowleys River
  - location: south of Yarrowitch
  - elevation: 335 m (1,099 ft)
- Length: 21 km (13 mi)

Basin features
- River system: Manning River catchment

Burns Creek, a watercourse of the Manning River catchment, is located in the Northern Tablelands region of New South Wales, Australia.

== Course and features ==
The Burns Creek rises on the eastern slopes of the Great Dividing Range, about 3 kilometres (1.9 mi) northeast by north from the locality of Dicks Hut. The river flows generally southeast through Enfield State Forest, then south and east southeast before reaching its confluence with the Rowleys River, in remote country, south southeast of Yarrowitch. The river descends 648 metres (2,126 ft) over its 21 kilometres (13 mi) course.

== See also ==
- Rivers of New South Wales
- List of rivers in New South Wales (A-K)
- List of rivers of Australia
