= Caparra =

Caparra can refer to:

- Cáparra, the remains of a Roman city in Spain
- Caparra Archaeological Site, the remains of a Spanish colonial settlement in Puerto Rico
- Caparra Creek, New South Wales, Australia
- High Island (Queensland), Queensland, Australia
