= Old Bar Airfield =

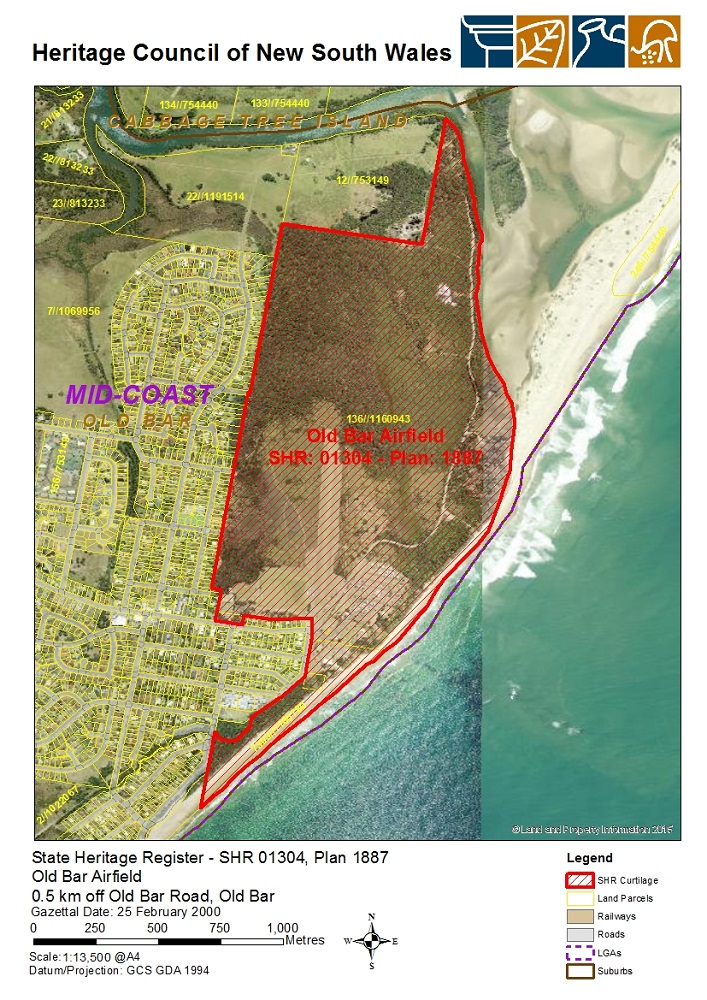
- Heritage boundaries

- Location within New South Wales Location within Australia
- 31.9649°S 152.5901°E
- Location: 0.5km off Old Bar Road, Old Bar, Mid-Coast Council, New South Wales, Australia

History
- Built: 1925–1925

Site notes
- Owner: Land and Property Management Authority (LPMA)

New South Wales Heritage Register
- Official name: Old Bar Airfield; Old Bar Airstrip; Old Bar Aerodrome
- Type: state heritage (complex / group)
- Designated: 25 February 2000
- Reference no.: 1304
- Type: Airfield/Landing Strip
- Category: Transport - Air
- Builders: George Bunyan and family

Old Bar Airfield is a heritage-listed airfield located off Old Bar Road at Old Bar, in the Mid North Coast region of New South Wales, Australia. It was built from in 1925 by George Bunyan and family. It is also known as Old Bar Airstrip and Old Bar Aerodrome. It was added to the New South Wales State Heritage Register on 25 February 2000.

== History ==
Old Bar Airfield was constructed in the mid 1920s by George Bunyan as part of the fledgling air mail and aerial passenger services following the Commonwealth Government's decision to call tenders to award contracts for these services. 44 Aerodromes and 90 Emergency Landing Grounds were established in the years to 1926 and Old Bar was the main refueling stop between Sydney and Brisbane.

The airfield was designated as an "aerodrome" on 6 November 1930 by the Department of Defence.

A major historical event was the Air Pageant held on 15 and 16 November 1930 with 35 planes including the "Canberra" owned by Sir Charles Kingsford Smith and the "City of Lismore" piloted by Captain Charles Ulm. The pageant featured "joyrides" typical of the early aviation "barnstorming" tradition.

The airfield was the refueling point for Kingsford-Smith and Ulm's Australian National Airways till mid 1931. From July, 1931 New England Airways operated a bi-weekly air service between Sydney and Brisbane stopping at Lismore, Grafton, Coffs Harbour and Old Bar.

The Royal Australian Air Force utilised the airstrip for refueling from the mid to late 1930s with regular visits of up to six Hawker Demons at Old Bar. For twelve months during 1939-40, the RAAF stationed a Wackett Gannet at Old Bar to undertake coastal surveying and mapping. The Old Bar Aerodrome was designated an emergency landing field for the RAAF during World War II.

The Old Bar Airstrip was visited constantly by the key Australian aviation pioneers including Kingsford-Smith, Ulm, Jean Batten and Nancy Bird Walton.

The Airfield was closed by Greater Taree City Council in February 1989 but was subsequently re-opened on the order of the then state Minister for Natural Resources, the Hon. Ian Causley.

On 1 January 1995 Greater Taree City Council removed runway markers, flight strip markers and the wind sock, effectively closing the airfield. The markers and windsock are presently stored at Taree Airport.

Prior to the site's heritage listing in February 2000, the council proposed to convert the airstrip site to playing fields and a skateboarding rink, with only token "special occasion" landings on what would become sporting fields.

In 2000 a 1.2m high post and wire fence 200m long was constructed at the airstrip's southern end. The 60m wide southern end is also to be fenced, as required by Council's insurers. This will allow the airstrip to be used for landings and take-offs without risk of any vehicle or person crossing the airstrip at the critical moment.

The airfield remained in use as of 2022, mostly by light sport aircraft.

== Description ==
Old Bar Airstrip is located near Old Bar Beach and is now surrounded by recreation facilities, caravan park and residential subdivision.

The Old Bar airfield is situated at the southern end of Old Bar Park immediately west of Old Bar Beach and adjoining Old Bar Road. While in their beginnings such fields initially accepted aircraft landings from a range of directions the terrain and remnant native vegetation suggest strongly that the current airstrip developed early in the airfield's history.

The airstrip is grassed on a compacted clay base, follows a north-south alignment and is approximately 675 metres in length by an average 60 metres in width.

Adjoining the airstrip to the west is an area of native wet heath vegetation containing the vulnerable plant species, Austral toadflax, (Thesium australe) and to the north and west are native eucalypt woodlands.

Various ephemera such as markers, fuel shed and windsock have been removed over the years. Of these the windsock and runway and flight strip markers are being stored at Taree Airport. A concrete slab at the south eastern end of the runway may be the foundation slab for the 1940s pump (National Trust of Australia (NSW) 1998)

It was reported to be in excellent physical condition with medium archaeological potential as at 19 July 1999. It was believed that the underground fuel tank may still be on site and intact; however, subsequent investigations have found no trace and local informants recalled that they were removed sometime in the 1960s. There may also be remnants of the former fuel pump.

Old Bar Airfield is largely intact. It was always a simple grassed airstrip in a native vegetation setting and it remains in this condition to the present day. Ephemera such as the windsock and fuel tanks have been re-sited but the windsock is in storage and could be reinstated.

== Heritage listing ==
The Old Bar Airfield has national historic significance as a rare intact and representative example of a key "aerodrome" from the earliest days of Australian aviation which has direct and important links with the nation's major aviation pioneers Sir Charles Kingsford-Smith, Captain C. T. P. Ulm, Jean Batten and Nancy Bird Walton. The Airfield was a vital component in the development of Australia's air mail and aerial passenger services, was the site of an historic 1930 air pageant and was utilised by the RAAF during the Second World War for refueling and coastal mapping and surveying.

The Airfield has significance for its ability to contribute to an understanding of the cultural history of Australia's earliest development of an aviation industry including air mail, passenger services and associated joy flight/aerial pageantry activity. The Old Bar Airfield has social significance to the aviation community throughout Australia and also to the local community particularly older residents who have witnessed the town's growth in association with the airfield and who for many years have campaigned for the Airfield's permanent protection.

The Airfield has high aesthetic significance when viewed from the air because of its coastal setting immediately adjoining the coastline within a bushland setting and with the backdrop of the Manning River Estuary. The Airfield has landmark qualities for the town of Old Bar

Old Bar Airfield was listed on the New South Wales State Heritage Register on 25 February 2000 having satisfied the following criteria.

The place is important in demonstrating the course, or pattern, of cultural or natural history in New South Wales.

The item is historically significant because of its key role in the development of Australia's air mail and aerial passenger services, its direct association with aviation pioneers Sir Charles Kingsford-Smith, Captain C.T.P Ulm, Jean Batten and Nancy Bird Walton, as the site of an historic air pageant in 1930 and its military use during World War II as a refueling and coastal mapping and surveying station for the RAAF.

The place is important in demonstrating aesthetic characteristics and/or a high degree of creative or technical achievement in New South Wales.

The item has high aesthetic significance when viewed from the air because of its setting immediately adjoining the coastline, within an area of native heath vegetation, fringed by eucalypt woodland and with the backdrop of the Manning Estuary and from the aerial perspective the airfield is the predominant landmark with strong sensory appeal in the town of Old Bar.

The place has strong or special association with a particular community or cultural group in New South Wales for social, cultural or spiritual reasons.

The item is socially significant because both the local community and the aviation community throughout Australia have recognised and are directly associated with its long history and have campaigned vigorously over many years for its recognition and conservation.

The place has potential to yield information that will contribute to an understanding of the cultural or natural history of New South Wales.

The item has major significance for its ability to contribute to an understanding of the cultural history of Australia's earliest development of an aviation industry and its role in air mail, aerial passenger services and joy flight/aerial pageantry activity.

The place possesses uncommon, rare or endangered aspects of the cultural or natural history of New South Wales.

Old Bar Airfield is a very rare example of an historic airfield in a coastal town setting, similar airfields have been upgraded with tarmac and facilities or have been closed for redevelopment.

The place is important in demonstrating the principal characteristics of a class of cultural or natural places/environments in New South Wales.

Old Bar Airfield represents the typical grassed airfield of the 1920s/1930s that were utilised by Australia's newly founded aviation industry. Its coastal setting with river backdrop, its overall size, runway length and low grassed appearance are compatible with and reminiscent of the 1920s/1930s Kingsford-Smith Airport in Sydney.
