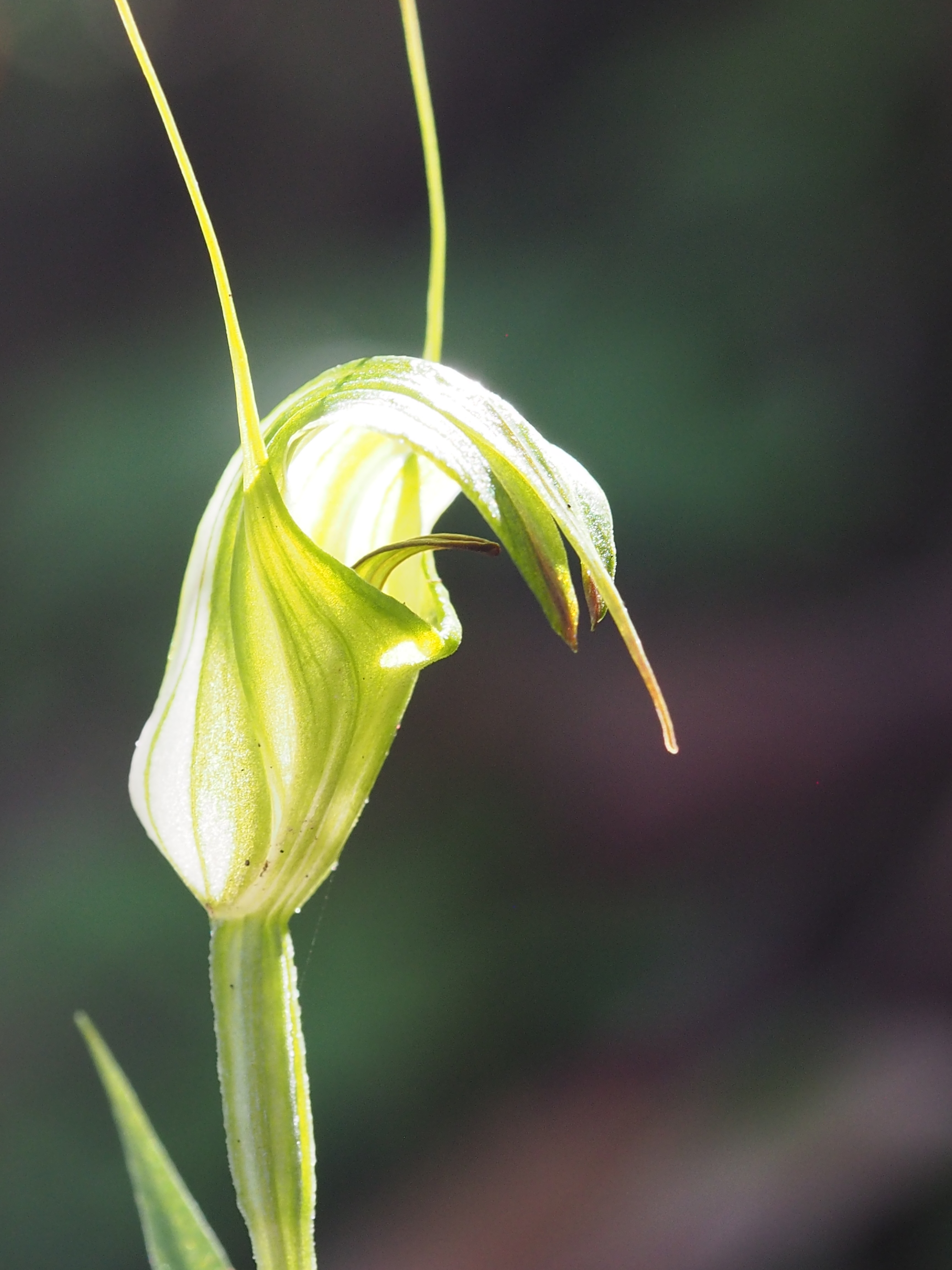
- Near Nowendoc

Scientific classification
- Kingdom: Plantae
- Clade: Embryophytes
- Clade: Tracheophytes
- Clade: Spermatophytes
- Clade: Angiosperms
- Clade: Monocots
- Order: Asparagales
- Family: Orchidaceae
- Subfamily: Orchidoideae
- Tribe: Cranichideae
- Genus: Pterostylis
- Species: P. russellii

Binomial name
- Pterostylis russellii T.E.Hunt

Synonyms
- Diplodium russellii (T.E.Hunt) (D.L.Jones) & M.A.Clem.

= Pterostylis russellii =

Russell's greenhood

Species of orchid

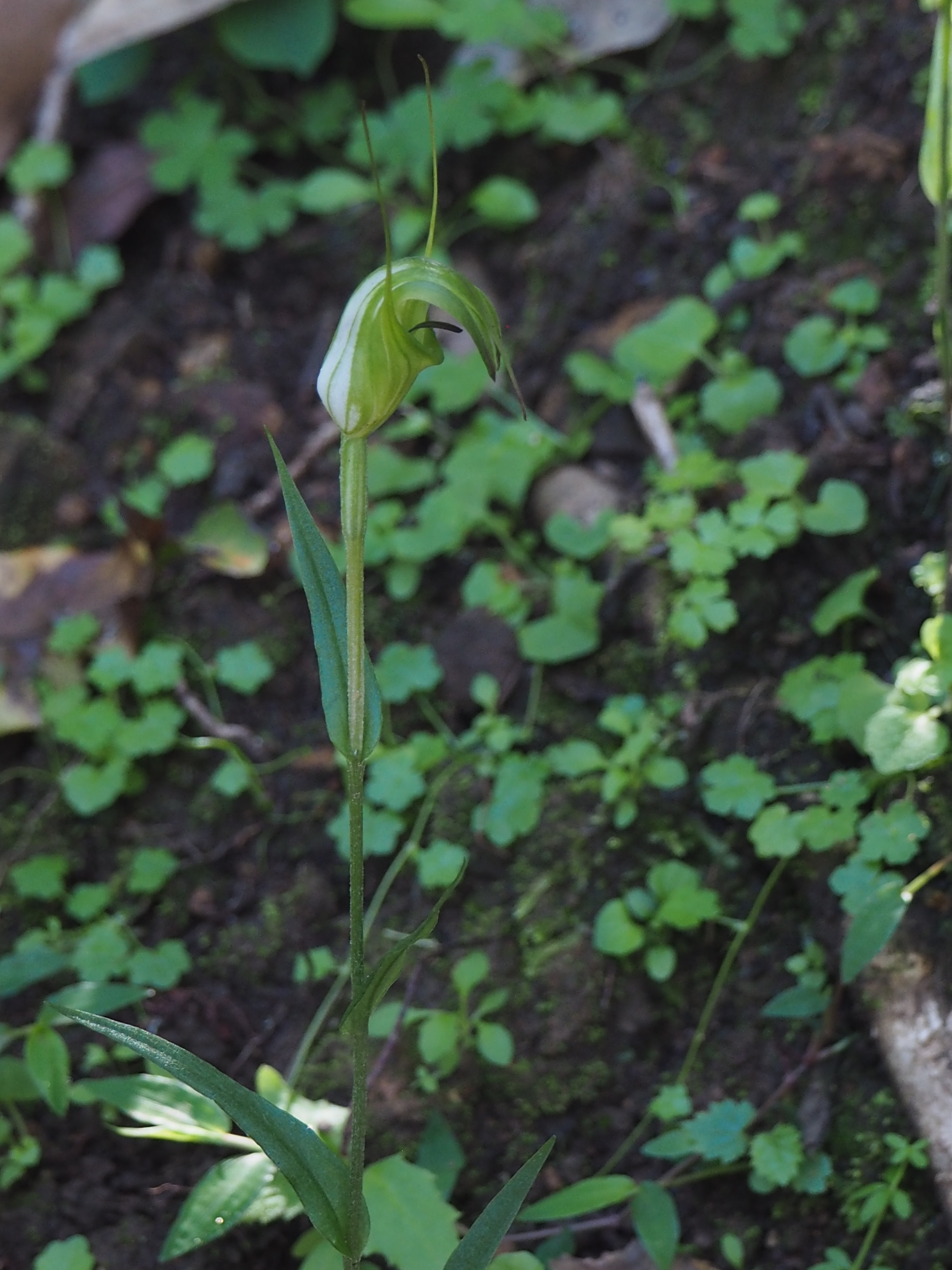
Habit

Pterostylis russellii, commonly known as Russell's greenhood, is a species of orchid endemic to eastern Australia. Non-flowering plants have a rosette of leaves flat on the ground but flowering plants have a single shiny white and dark green flower on a flowering stem lacking a rosette but with a few spreading stem leaves.

== Description ==
Pterostylis russellii is a terrestrial, perennial, deciduous, herb with an underground tuber and when not flowering, a rosette of between three and six dark green, oblong to heart-shaped leaves, each leaf 15–40 mm (0.6–2 in) long and 10–18 mm (0.4–0.7 in) wide. Flowering plants have a single shiny dark green and white flower 15–20 mm (0.6–0.8 in) long and 7–9 mm (0.3–0.4 in) wide on a stem 200–350 mm (8–10 in) tall with three to five stem leaves. The dorsal sepal and petals are fused, forming a hood or "galea" over the column curving forward in a semi-circle. The dorsal sepal ends with a thread-like tip 3–7 mm (0.1–0.3 in) long. The lateral sepals are held closely against the galea, have erect thread-like tips 20–30 mm (0.8–1 in) long and a protruding, V-shaped sinus between their bases. The labellum is about 11–14 mm (0.4–0.6 in) long and about 3 mm (0.1 in) wide, blackish, blunt and protruding above the sinus. Flowering occurs from April to August.

== Taxonomy and naming ==
Pterostylis russellii was first formally described in 1952 by Trevor Hunt from a specimen collected near Brisbane and the description was published in The Orchid Journal (California). The specific epithet (russellii) honours "Mr. A.J. Russell, then Captain Russell, a keen and competent student of Australian orchids" who first collected this species.

== Distribution and habitat ==
Russell's greenhood grows in moist, shady places in forest between Grafton in New South Wales and Gympie in Queensland.
