= Manning Point, New South Wales =

Manning Point New South Wales
- Coordinates: 31°54′54″S 152°40′04″E
- Population: 229 (2021 census)
- Postcode(s): 2430
- Elevation: 3 m (10 ft)
- Location: 339 km (211 mi) NNE of Sydney; 191 km (119 mi) NE of Newcastle; 33 km (21 mi) E of Taree; 105 km (65 mi) SSW of Port Macquarie
- LGA(s): Mid-Coast Council
- County: Macquarie
- Parish: Oxley
- State electorate(s): Myall Lakes
- Federal division(s): Lyne
Localities around Manning Point:
Mamboo Island	Harrington	Harrington
Mitchells Island	Manning Point	Tasman Sea
Old Bar	Tasman Sea	Tasman Sea

Manning Point is a small village located at the mouth of the Manning River in New South Wales, Australia . Lying on Mitchells Island, it lies opposite the town of Harrington. It is 33 kilometres (21 mi) east of Taree on the Mid North Coast. At the 2006 census, Manning Point had a population of 228.

It was previously known as Brighton.

Besides the holiday rental units, it has a general store, a bowling club, the two caravan parks, a cafe, and a bait shop. The general store is also the news agent, the video rental shop, the Australia Post Office, the bottle shop, the burger and fish and chips grill, and the grocery store.

The type collection of the jewel beetle species Maoraxia auroimpressa was collected at Manning Point.
