= Cells River =

Coordinates: 31°31′S 152°03′E

Location
- Country: Australia
- State: New South Wales
- IBRA: New England Tablelands, NSW North Coast
- District: Northern Tablelands, Mid North Coast
- Local government areas: Walcha, Port Macquarie-Hastings

Physical characteristics
- Source: Great Dividing Range
  - location: southeast of Yarrowitch
  - elevation: 1,010 m (3,310 ft)
- Mouth: confluence with the Rowleys River
  - location: northwest Wingham
  - elevation: 216 m (709 ft)
- Length: 32 km (20 mi)

Basin features
- River system: Manning River catchment
- National park: Cottan-Bimbang

Cells River, a perennial river of the Manning River catchment, is located in the Northern Tablelands and Mid North Coast districts of New South Wales, Australia.

== Course and features ==
Cells River rises on the eastern slopes of the Great Dividing Range, southeast of Yarrowitch, and flows generally southeast before reaching its confluence with the Rowleys River, in high country northwest of Wingham. The river descends 794 metres (2,605 ft) over its 32 kilometres (20 mi) course.

== See also ==
- Rivers of New South Wales
- List of rivers of New South Wales (A–K)
- List of rivers of Australia
