= Nowendoc River =

River in Australia

Coordinates: 31°45′S 152°04′E

Nowendoc River Peel Creek
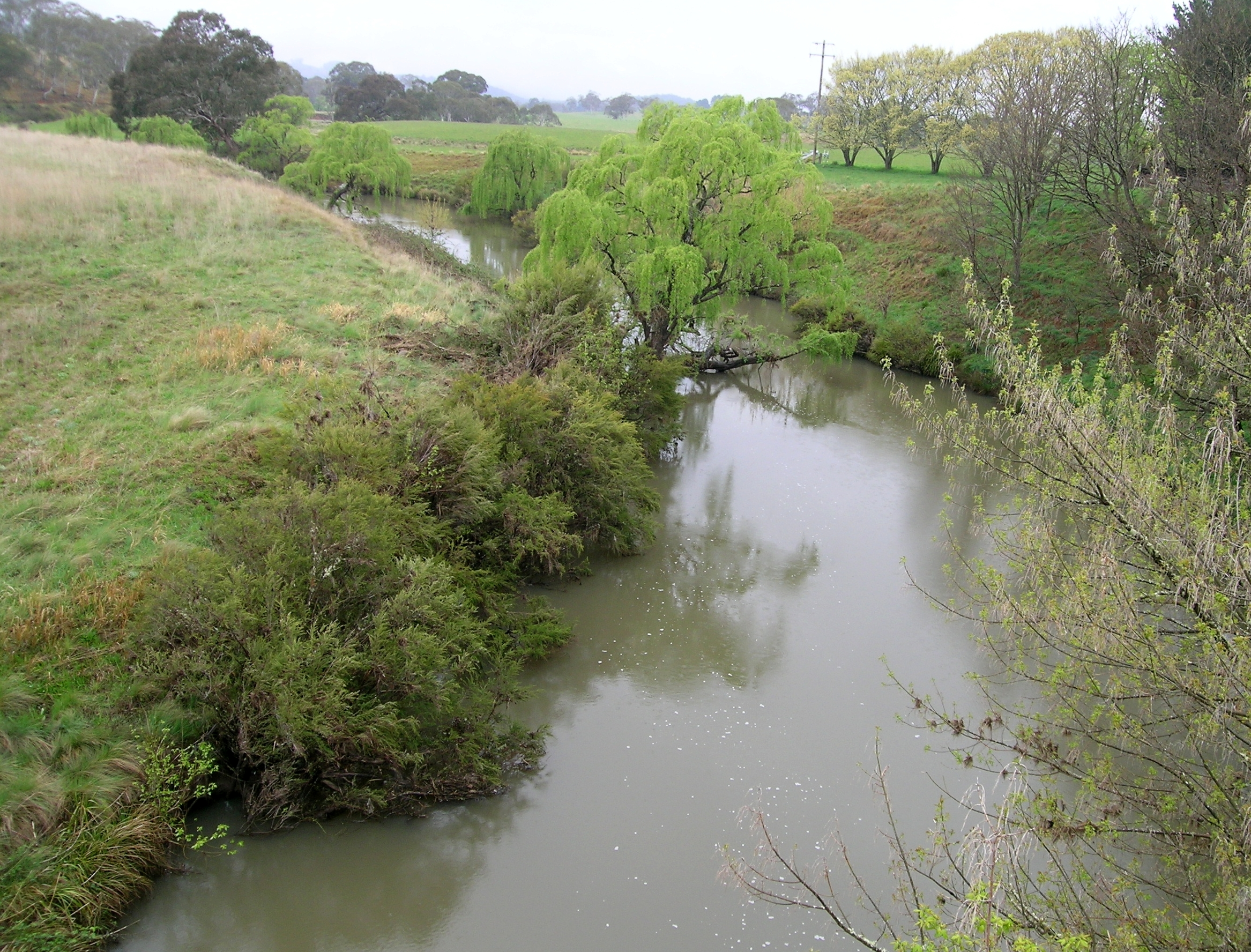
- Nowendoc River, 2011

Location
- Country: Australia
- State: New South Wales
- IBRA: New England Tablelands, NSW North Coast
- District: Northern Tablelands, Mid North Coast
- Local government areas: Mid-Coast Council

Physical characteristics
- Source: Great Dividing Range
  - location: below the Black Sugarloaf, south of Walcha
  - elevation: 1,150 m (3,770 ft)
- Mouth: confluence with the Manning River
  - location: near Knorrit Flat, west of Wingham
  - elevation: 52 m (171 ft)
- Length: 115 km (71 mi)

Basin features
- River system: Manning River catchment
- Tributaries
  - left: Cooplacurripa River, Rowleys River
- National park: Nowendoc National Park

Nowendoc River, a perennial river of the Manning River catchment, is located in the Northern Tablelands and Mid North Coast districts of New South Wales, Australia.

== Course and features ==
Nowendoc River rises on the eastern slopes of the Great Dividing Range, north of the Black Sugarloaf, south of Walcha and flows generally southeast, joined by two tributaries including Cooplacurripa River and Rowleys River, before reaching its confluence with the Manning River, west of Wingham. The river descends 1,100 metres (3,600 ft) over its 115 kilometres (71 mi) course.

== See also ==
- Rivers of New South Wales
- List of rivers of New South Wales (L–Z)
- List of rivers of Australia
