= Nikita Ridgeway =

Australian Bundjalung/Biripi graphic designer

Nikita Ridgeway (born 1986) is a Bundjalung/Biripi graphic designer from Australia, who was awarded the a BBC 100 Women Award in 2015 in recognition of her entrepreneurial work and advocacy for Aboriginal graphic design.

== Biography ==
Ridgeway was born in 1986 belongs to the Bundjalung and Biripi peoples. Her parents are Steven and Dianne Ridgeway; her grandmother was the historian and writer, Ruby Langford Ginibi. She attended Blacktown Girls' High School, and was the first Koori to be the school captain.

A graphic designer, she founded Dreamtime Ink Australia which is a social media account specialising in Aboriginal tattoo art in Australia. She also owns Boss Lady Creative Design Agency, which specialises in Aboriginal graphic design. In 2020 Ridgeway created artwork used in National Reconciliation Week.

In 2021 she created the brand for Coles' Supermarkets renewable energy initiative. Also in 2021 she created indigenous artwork used to decorate two fire trucks used by Wreck Bay (Australia) Rural Fire Brigade. The brigade is owned and managed by the Wreck Bay Aboriginal Community Council. Ridgeway has also worked on a variety of state-wide, national and international commissions, including the logo design for Sydney Water's Innovation Festival in 2021 and with the First Nations Foundation on a superannuation toolkit.

Ridgeway also established Australia's first indigenous hip-hop record label with her brother Stephen. Called Redfern Records, the label was named after the Sydney neighbourhood of Redfern they grew up in.

== Awards ==
- BBC 100 Women (2015)
- NSW Aboriginal Woman of the Year Finalist (2016)
