= Manning River Skull =

The Manning River Skull (or Taree Man) is a specimen of a caucasoid man discovered in 2011 on the bank of the Manning River in northern New South Wales, Australia.

When first discovered, local authorities speculated that the skull might be that of a missing local teenager. However, experts from the Australian National University later found there was an 80% chance the skull dated from 1650–1700 and a 20% chance that it belonged to someone living between 1780 and 1810.

It is currently held that Captain James Cook was the first European to reach eastern Australia, in 1770. However, the discovery of the Manning River Skull could, "open up a whole lot of avenues of history that we haven't been able to explore before". Australian archaeologist Adam Ford suggested that, "before we rewrite the history of European settlement we have to consider a number of issues, particularly the circumstances of the discovery," Ford added, "The fact the skull is in good condition and found alone could easily point to it coming from a private collection and skulls were very popular with collectors in the 19th century."
