= Caparra Creek =

Coordinates: 31°45′S 152°13′E

Caparra Creek Western Branch Dingo Creek
- Location of mouth

Location
- Country: Australia
- State: New South Wales
- Region: NSW North Coast (IBRA), Mid North Coast
- Municipality: Mid-Coast Council

Physical characteristics
- Source: Rowleys Peak, Great Dividing Range
  - location: Tapin Tops National Park
  - elevation: 873 m (2,864 ft)
- Mouth: confluence with the Dingo Creek
  - location: northwest of Wingham
  - elevation: 43 m (141 ft)
- Length: 50 km (31 mi)

Basin features
- River system: Manning River catchment
- National park: Tapin Tops NP

Caparra Creek, a perennial stream of the Manning River catchment, is located in the Mid North Coast region of New South Wales, Australia.

== Course and features ==
The Caparra Creek rises below Rowleys Peak on the eastern slopes of the Great Dividing Range in remote country within Tapin Tops National Park, northwest of the town of Wingham. The river flows generally southeast before reaching its confluence with the Dingo Creek, northwest of Wingham. The river descends 831 metres (2,726 ft) over its 50 kilometres (31 mi) course.

== See also ==
- List of rivers of Australia
- List of rivers in New South Wales (A-K)
- Rivers of New South Wales
