= Connollys Creek =

Coordinates: 31°51′00″S 152°08′30″E

Location
- Country: Australia
- State: New South Wales
- Region: NSW North Coast (IBRA), Mid North Coast
- Municipality: Mid-Coast Council

Physical characteristics
- Source: Great Dividing Range
  - location: Knorrit State Forest, near Rocks Crossing
- Mouth: confluence with the Manning River
- Length: 16 km (9.9 mi)

Basin features
- River system: Manning River catchment

Connollys Creek, a watercourse of the Manning River catchment, is located in the Mid North Coast region of New South Wales, Australia.

== Course and features ==
The Connollys Creek rises on the eastern slopes of the Great Dividing Range within the Knorrit State Forest, about 3.5 kilometres (2.2 mi) east of the locality of Rocks Crossing. The river flows generally south by east before reaching its confluence with the Manning River, over its 16 kilometres (9.9 mi) course.

The Manning River eventually flows into the Tasman Sea through a minor delta east of Taree.

== See also ==
- List of rivers of Australia
- List of rivers in New South Wales (A-K)
- Rivers of New South Wales
