= Bobin Creek =

Coordinates: 31°42′S 152°16′E

- Location of mouth

Location
- Country: Australia
- State: New South Wales
- Region: NSW North Coast (IBRA), Mid North Coast
- Municipality: Mid-Coast Council

Physical characteristics
- Source: Rowleys Peak, Great Dividing Range
  - location: Tapin Tops National Park
- Mouth: confluence with the Dingo Creek
  - location: northwest of Wingham
- Length: 24 km (15 mi)

Basin features
- River system: Manning River catchment
- National park: Tapin Tops NP

Bobin Creek is a non–perennial stream of the Manning River catchment in the Mid North Coast region of New South Wales, Australia.

== Course and features ==
Bobin Creek rises below Rowleys Peak on the eastern slopes of the Great Dividing Range in remote country within Tapin Tops National Park, northwest of the town of Wingham. The river flows generally southeast before reaching its confluence with the Dingo Creek, northwest of Wingham, over its 24 kilometres (15 mi) course.

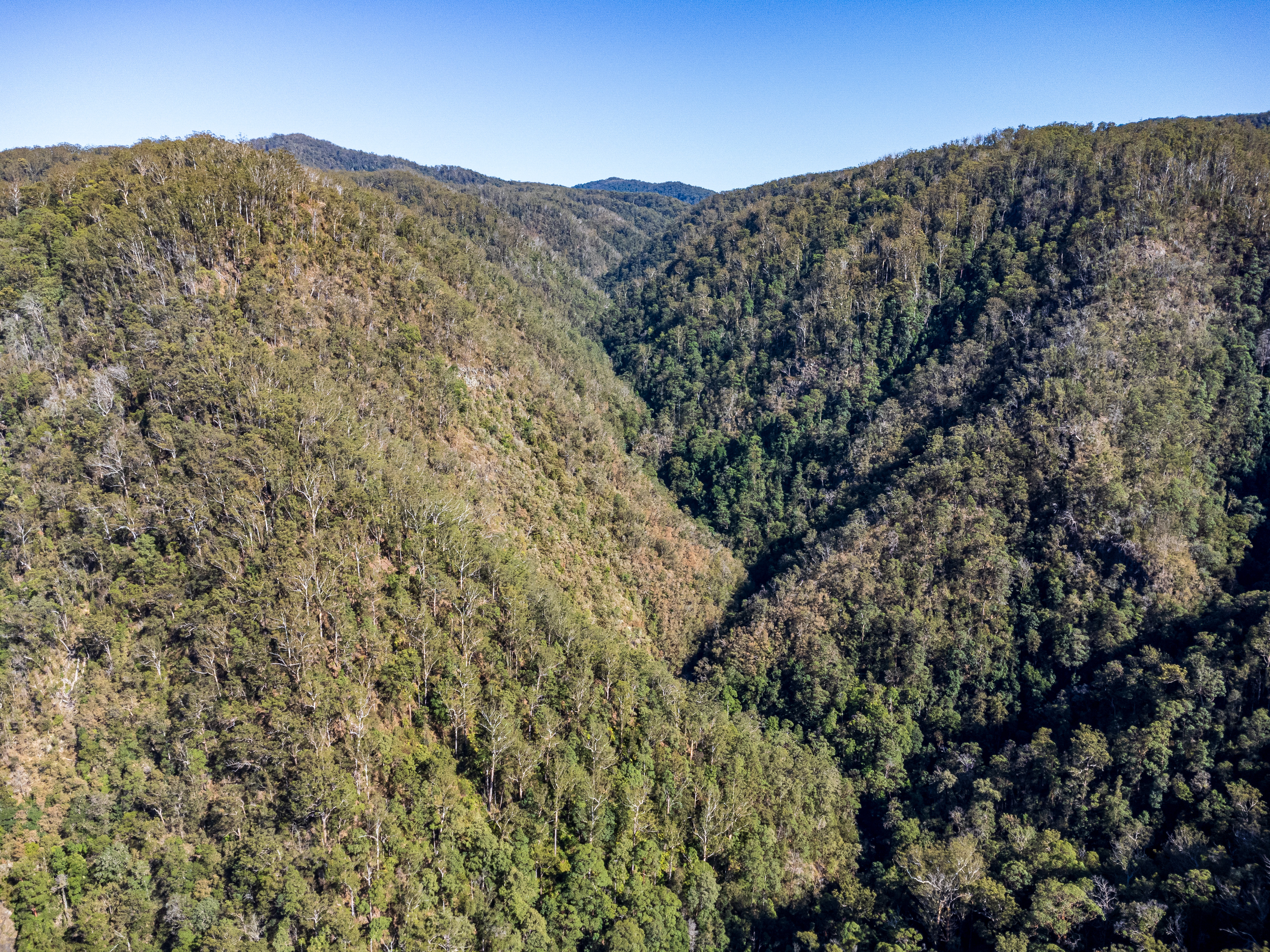
Upper Reaches of Bobin Creek looking West. Rowley's Peak is visible on the horizon to the left of the center

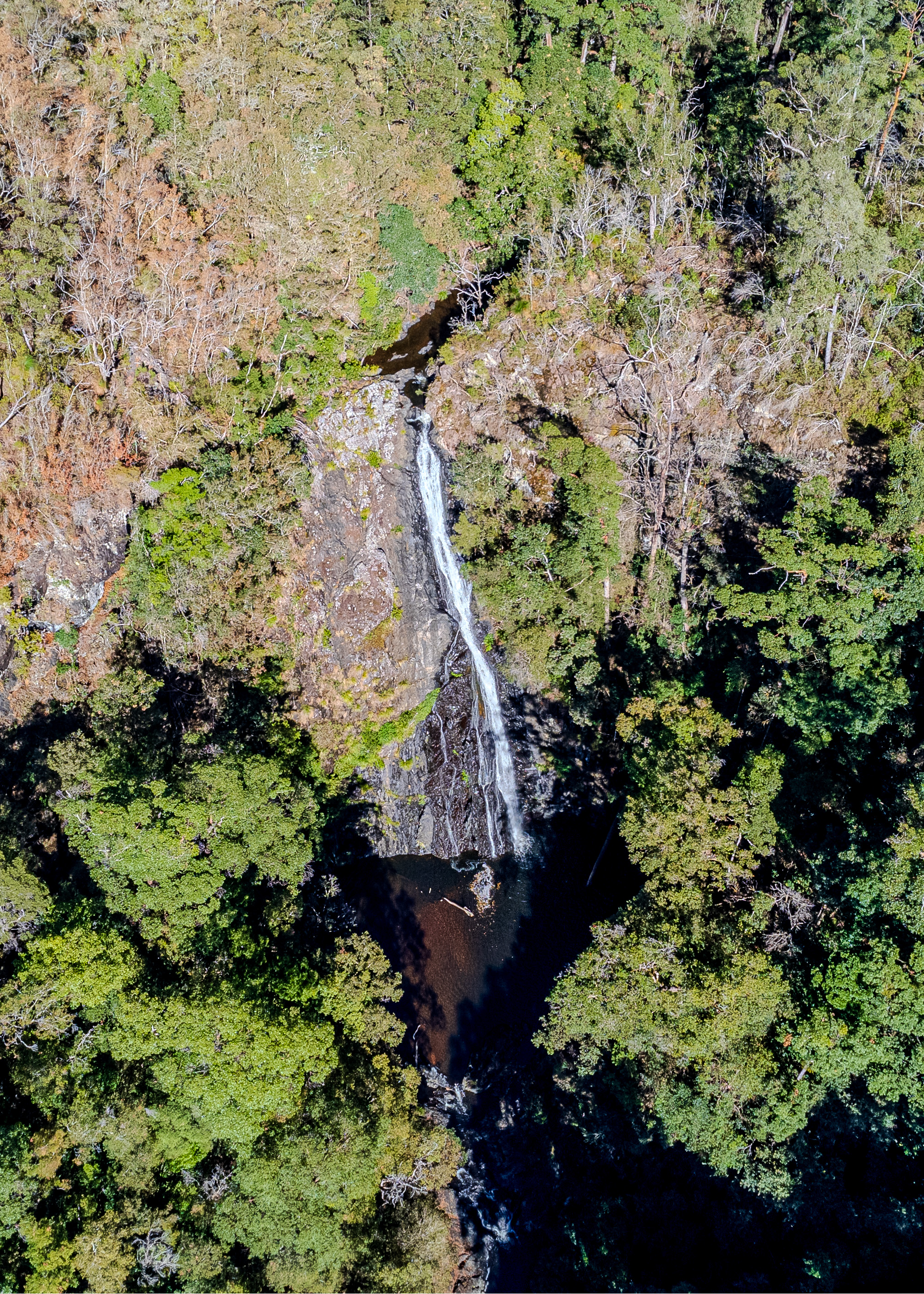
Deep Gorge Falls, Bobin Creek. 31°39'25"S 152°12'54"E

== See also ==
- List of rivers of Australia
- List of rivers in New South Wales (A-K)
- Rivers of New South Wales
