= Blacktown Boys High School =

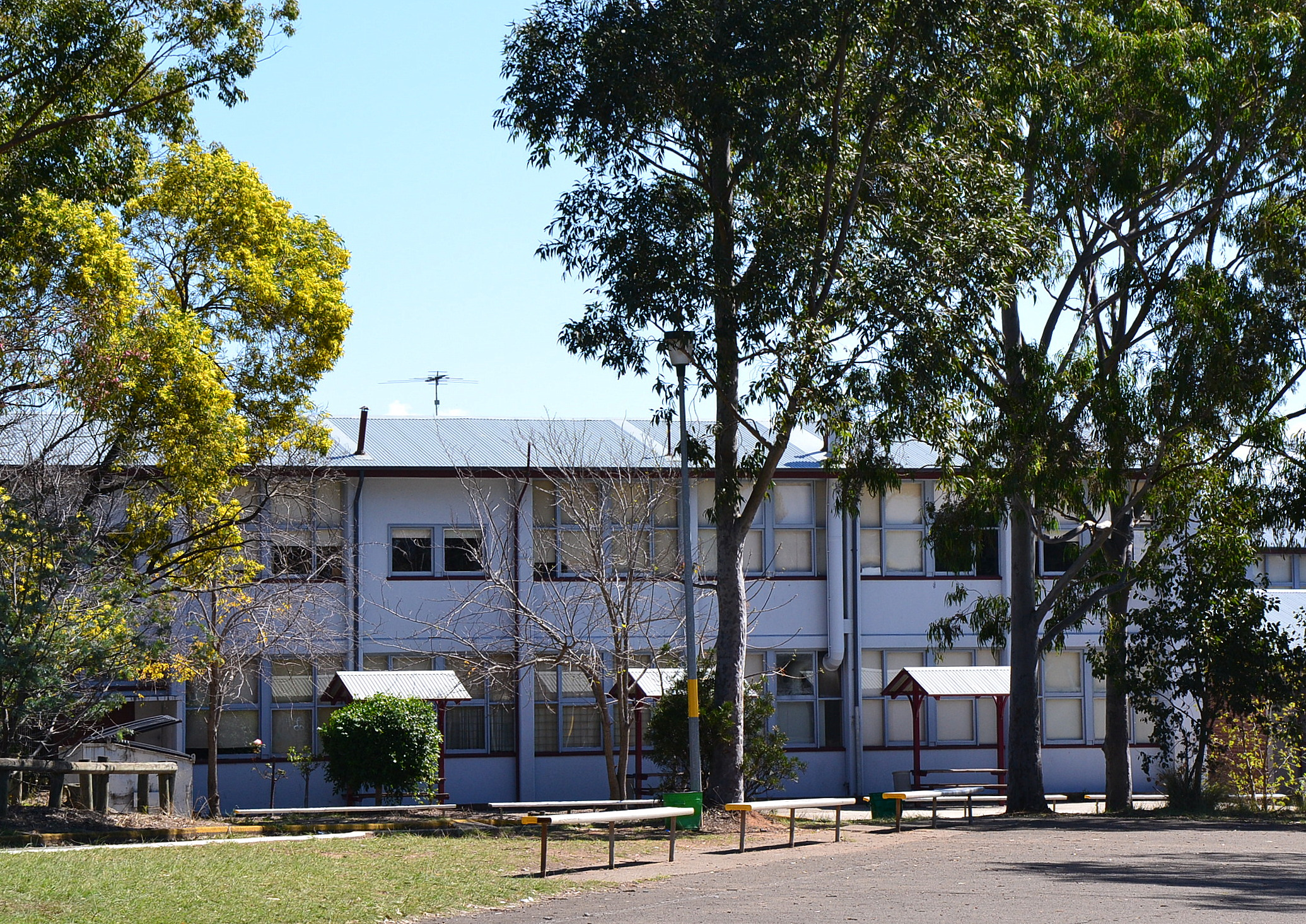
- Blacktown Boys High School, pictured in 2014

Location
- Blacktown, Western Sydney, New South Wales; Australia; 33°45′43″S 150°54′43″E

Information
- Type: Government-funded single-sex academically partially selective secondary day school
- Motto: Learn to live
- Established: January 1956; 70 years ago (as Blacktown High School; co-educational); January 1959; 67 years ago (as Blacktown Boys High School)
- Sister school: Blacktown Girls High School
- School district: Bungarribee; Metropolitan North
- Educational authority: New South Wales Department of Education
- Oversight: NSW Education Standards Authority
- Principal: Robert Murie
- Teaching staff: 52 FTE (2022)
- Years: 7–12
- Gender: Boys
- Enrolment: 822 (2022)
- Campus type: Suburban
- Colours: Gold and maroon
- Website: blacktownb-h.schools.nsw.gov.au

Blacktown Boys High School (BBHS) is a government-funded single-sex academically partially selective secondary day school for boys, located in Blacktown, a western Sydney suburb of New South Wales, Australia.

Established in 1956 as Blacktown High School, the school enrolled approximately 822 students in 2022, from Year 7 to Year 12, of whom 0.02 percent identified as Indigenous Australians and 89 percent spoke English as a second or foreign language. The school is operated by the NSW Department of Education in accordance with a curriculum developed by the New South Wales Education Standards Authority. The principal is Robert Murie, succeeding David Calleja.

Its sister school is Blacktown Girls High School which is located adjacent to the high school.

== History ==
The school was originally established in January 1956 as the co-educational Blacktown High School. However, owing to a growing local population and in accordance with government policy, it was decided that the schools would be split into two single-sex schools: Blacktown Boys High School, and Blacktown Girls High School. Both were fully split by 1959. Blacktown Boys was officially opened on 17 October 1959 by the Deputy Premier and Minister of Education, Bob Heffron.

A school cadet unit was formed in 1961, and disbanded in 1975 due to the Whitlam Labor Government withdrawing financial support to the Cadet Programme in Public Schools.

The school became a partially selective school in 2010.

== Notable former pupils ==
- Bob Brown – former politician and activist; former Leader of the Australian Greens; former Australian Senator; 1961 school captain
- Charles Casuscelli – politician; former Liberal Party Member for Strathfield (2011–2015); Chair of the NSW Parliament's Transport and Infrastructure Committee
- Graham Joseph Hill – theologian
- Mert Ney – perpetrator of the 2019 Sydney CBD stabbings.

== See also ==
- List of government schools in New South Wales
- List of selective high schools in New South Wales
- Education in Australia
