= Blacktown Girls High School =

Location
- Blacktown, New South Wales; Australia; 33.7616°S 150.9107°E

Information
- Type: Government-funded single-sex academically partially selective secondary day school
- Established: January 1956; 70 years ago (as Blacktown High School; co-educational); January 1959; 67 years ago (as Blacktown Girls High School)
- Sister school: Blacktown Boys High School
- School district: Bungarribee
- Educational authority: New South Wales Department of Education
- Oversight: NSW Education Standards Authority
- Principal: Maria Trimmis
- Teaching staff: 57.3 FTE (2018)
- Years: 7–12
- Gender: Girls
- Enrolment: 753 (2018)
- Campus type: Suburban
- Colours: Maroon and white
- Website: blacktowng-h.schools.nsw.gov.au

Blacktown Girls High School (abbreviated as BGHS) is a government-funded single-sex academically partially selective secondary day school for girls, located in Blacktown, a suburb of western Sydney, New South Wales, Australia.

Established in 1956 as the co-educational Blacktown High School, the school enrolled approximately 750 students in 2018, from Year 7 to Year 12, of whom three percent identified as Indigenous Australians and 85 percent were from a language background other than English. The school is operated by the NSW Department of Education in accordance with a curriculum developed by the New South Wales Education Standards Authority.

The school's brother school is Blacktown Boys High School.

== History ==
The school was originally established in January 1956 as Blacktown High School. However, owing to a growing local population and in accordance with government policy, it was decided that the schools would be split into two single sex schools: Blacktown Boys and Blacktown Girls High Schools. Both were fully split by 1959.

== Notable alumni ==
- Toni Collette, actress
- Nikita Ridgeway, tattoo artist and graphic designer

== See also ==
- List of government schools in New South Wales
- List of selective high schools in New South Wales
- Education in Australia
