= Nowendoc National Park =

National park in New South Wales, Australia

- IUCN category II (national park)
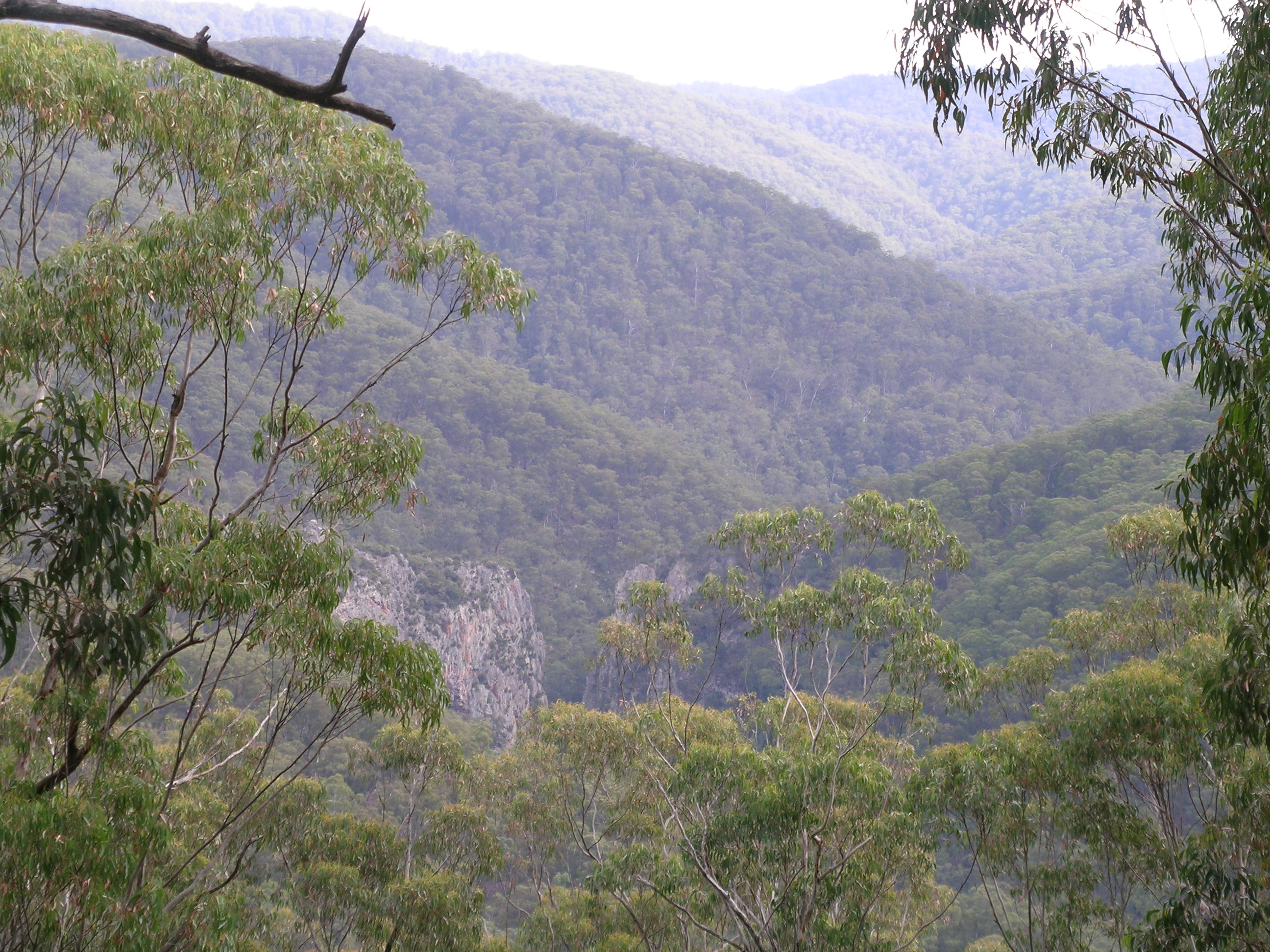
- Callaghans Canyon in Nowendoc National Park

- Location within New South Wales
- Location: New South Wales
- Nearest city: Nowendoc
- Coordinates: 31°31′58″S 151°35′52″E
- Area: 88 km^{2} (34 sq mi)
- Established: 1999
- Governing body: NSW National Parks & Wildlife Service
- Website: Official website

Nowendoc National Park is a protected area on the southern end of the Northern Tablelands and west of Nowendoc, New South Wales, Australia. It is located approximately 70 km south of Walcha and about 375 km north of Sydney.

The park is in the rugged escarpment terrain with eucalypt forests dominating the region, along with some rainforest along creeks. This park includes parts of the Myall and Callaghans Creeks which form part of the headwaters of the Barnard River.

== Access and facilities ==
All access roads to the park have a gravel surface, winding and steep in places and are unsuitable for caravans. The park is in two sections. The largest section can be reached from north-west of Nowendoc to visit the Myall Creek Camp Ground or view Callaghans Canyon. The south-eastern section with Wrights Hut is only accessible by a Four-wheel drive (4WD) and obtaining a key from the NSW National Parks & Wildlife Service for the locked gate on the trail south of Nowendoc The smaller, separate forested section is located on Millers Road.

There is a small, very basic camping area situated in a tall eucalypt forest beside Myall Creek with a wood-fired pit barbecue, but no other facilities. This and the Wrights Hut section area are accessible in dry weather with a 4WD. Self-reliant bushwalkers can explore local scenic waterfalls and rainforest. Further afield from the campground there are scenic canyons, waterfalls and heritage places.

== See also ==
- Protected areas of New South Wales
