= Old Bar, New South Wales =

Old Bar Baara (Birrpayi)
- Town
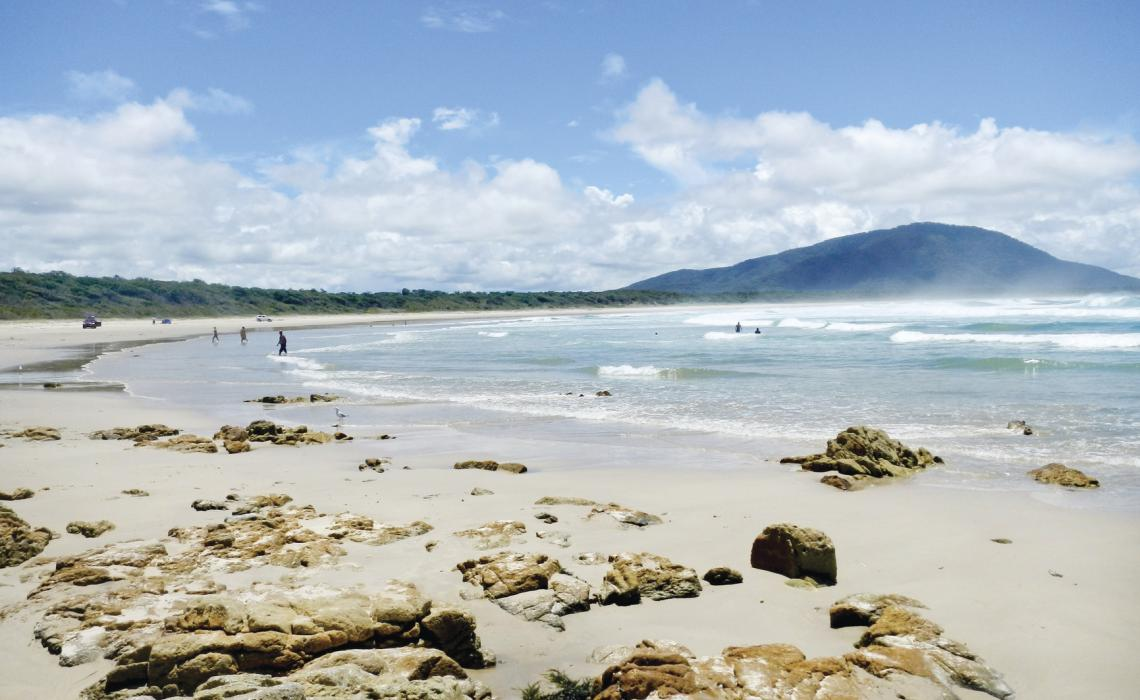
- Diamond Head Beach, Old Bar

- Coordinates: 31°58′S 152°35′E
- Country: Australia
- State: New South Wales
- LGA: Mid-Coast Council
- Location: 324 km (201 mi) NNE of Sydney; 177 km (110 mi) NE of Newcastle; 18 km (11 mi) E of Taree; 43 km (27 mi) N of Forster

Government
  - State electorate: Myall Lakes
  - Federal division: Lyne
- Elevation: 15 m (49 ft)

Population
  - Total: 5,126 (2021 census)
- Postcode: 2430
- County: Gloucester
- Parish: Bohnock
Localities around Old Bar
Bohnock	Cabbage Tree Island	Tasman Sea
Old Bar	Old Bar	Tasman Sea
Wallabi Point	Tasman Sea	Tasman Sea

Old Bar is a remote coastal town in New South Wales, Australia in Mid-Coast Council. It lies around 18 kilometres (11 mi) east of Taree on the Mid North Coast, and around 315 kilometres (196 mi) north of Sydney.

== Geography ==
Old Bar is on the southern side of the mouth of the Manning River.

== Demographics ==
The population of the urban centre was measured at 3,650 people in the 2011 census, and that of the suburb proper which includes some surrounding rural area at 4,272 people. It grew rapidly during a boom in housing in 1988.

== Airstrip ==
Light aircraft conducting pre-flight checks at Old Bar Airfield

Old Bar is a common place for light aircraft operations. Old Bar Airfield is an authorised grass airfield used for light aircraft takeoff and landing and is heritage listed.

== History ==
=== 2019 Bushfire ===
In November 2019, a bushfire that started at Hillville, south of Taree, jumped the Pacific Highway into the path of Old Bar and Wallabi Point. The day before, the NSW Rural Fire Service told residents in these areas to get out or defend. One home was confirmed lost on Old Bar Road.

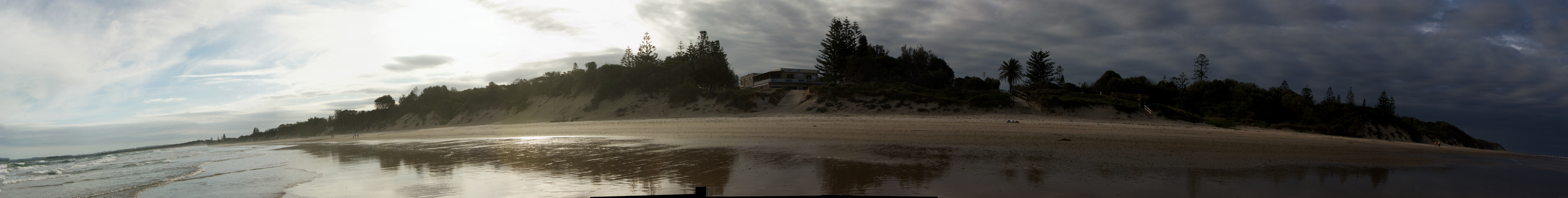
Old Bar Panorama, March 2014

== Heritage listings ==
Old Bar has a number of heritage-listed sites, including:

- 0.5 km off Old Bar Road: Old Bar Airfield

== Shared-use cycleways ==
Old Bar includes shared-use cycling and pedestrian infrastructure, including the Old Bar Cycleway connecting parts of the township and surrounding areas.

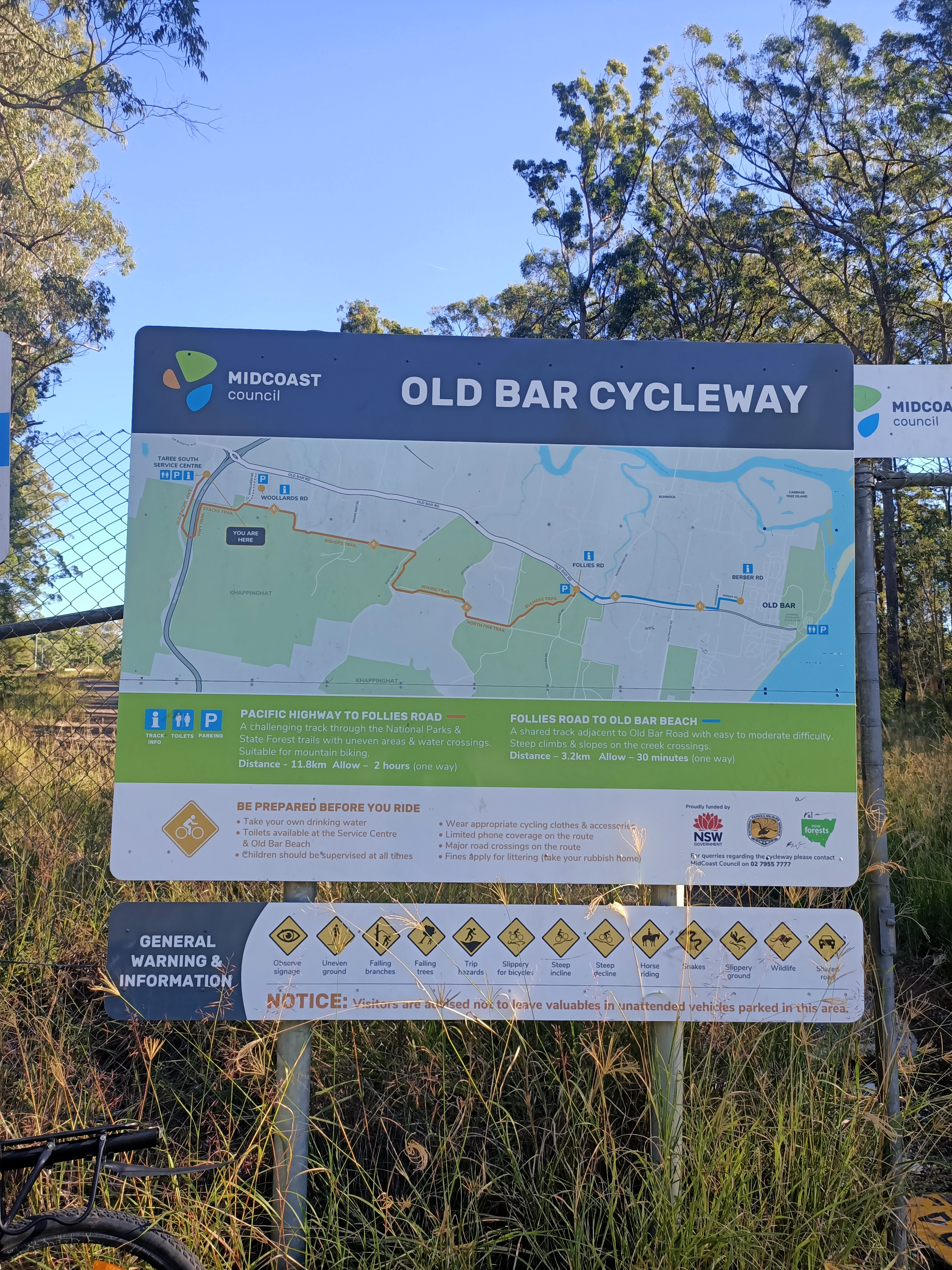
Old Bar Cycleway information sign showing a route map and safety guidance
