= Birrbay =

Indigenous people of New South Wales in Australia

The Birrbay people, also spelt Birpai, Biripi, Birippi and variant spellings, are an Aboriginal Australian people of New South Wales. They share a dialect continuum with the Worimi people.

== Language ==
Birrbay
- Birbayi
- Native to: Australia
- Region: New South Wales
- Ethnicity: Birrbay
- Extinct: after 1932
- Language family: Pama–Nyungan: Yuin–Kuric; Kuri; Worimi; Gathang; Birrbay

Language codes
- ISO 639-3: xbj
- Glottolog: birr1241
- AIATSIS: E3
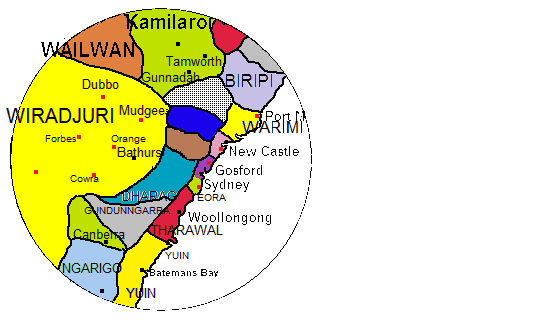
- Birrbay

The Gathang language (aka Gadjang or Worimi) is the speech of the Birrbay centred in Port Macquarie. Birpai is spelt Biripi in southern areas, such as Taree. Gathang was a community language spoken by the six tribes of the Worimi when required to meet. W. J. Enright found four elderly speakers of Gathang at Wauchope in 1932.

== Country ==
Birbay are the traditional owners of some 2,800 square miles (7,300 km^{2}) of Mid North Coast land, from Gloucester eastwards to the coast where the Manning River debouches into the Pacific at Taree. They were mainly located north of the Manning, and on the Forbes, Hastings (Dhungang) and Wilson rivers.

== Social organisation ==
The Birrbay, according to A. R. Radcliffe-Brown, had no moieties, but did divide their hordes into four intermarrying groups, 4 male phratries:

- Wombo
- Kurraboo
- Wirraw
- Murrong

marrying into four female groups:

- Gooran
- Karragan
- Wangan
- Wirragan

Traditions differ as to whether the Birrbay alternated between the coast and the hinterland seasonally. According to one tradition, they were divided into two distinct groups: inland women being called Winmurra and those of the coast Mari. The northern Birrbay alternated between inland and coastal camps according to the seasons, heading to locations that would provide best food sources. The modern families quite often still follow these protocols when the modern world allows.

An annual reunion of the MoB is held on the northern side of the hastings river in October. With descendants attending from far and wide, numbers for these group gatherings continue to increase annually, being held in a culturally significant location known in modern parlance as the coal wharf in contrast to assertions of near extinction claimed by John Heath in his recently released book Birrpai. Beyond the lens of Thomas Dick.

The Birrbay also had personal totems, called mari. The shark, dolphin and stingray are among the main totems of the clans.

== Murrawin ceremony ==
The Birrbay practised a form of ceremony known as Murrawin, found also among the Dunghutti and Gumbaynggirr peoples. It was described by R. H. Mathews in 1900. Unlike other rites, this did not require the presence of entire communities: two or three adjoining tribes would meet, choose initiated men from among each, and send them into the bush. They would select a spot several miles away, clear it, and create a 20-foot diameter circle on level ground with banked earth. There they would make bullroarers (gheewarra/guarra, according to the dialect) and return to the main camp. Over the following nights, once some elders had set up another site hundreds of yards away, whirl the bullroarers, while chanting incantations, and strike coolamons rhythmically with a nulla nulla. Gradually, the initiated men trickle over to this thoorapee site until all are gathered in. At this point, a slanging match is started as each tribe hurls invectives at another, The morning after, the whole tribal assembly shifts camp, and women and the young are separated from the men, who then file off, clicking their boomerangs, as they make their way to the ceremonial ring prepared several days earlier, where they dance.

On their return, they hunt game, and harvest honey, or grub up edible roots, to bring to the women's camp in procession (ngooraykoo binbinnie), where they all supper together. The men then return to the thoorapee, strip bark and form torches which they set alight and, swinging their firebrands, charge into the women's camp. Three times a boy, whom the women, on seeing the torches, prepare by stripping near their fire, is charged as if he were to be captured. A guardian, in tribal terms his brother-in-law, then, on the third attempt, takes him by the arm, and the tribesmen swing him up onto his shoulders as he is carried off.

In the thoorapee camp, the novice is placed prone, and two men straddle his midriff. Two grasp his shoulders, two his legs, and a fifth his loins, and he is raised high off the ground, with the two men still astraddle, and then lowered, thrice. The 7 men then grab their genitals and ask the novice to pay attention. Each then rubs the boy's nose and mouth, and he is then placed on a bed of leaves near the campfire. Feinting forays to poke his eyes out with sticks are fended off by two men wielding nulla nullas. The attackers back off, turned their backs, and walks backwards towards the boy, bending over him and threatening to shit on him. The men armed with nulla nullas intervene to save his honour. Buried in leaves, he must then lie there all night, motionless.

When morning breaks, two women elders edge near the camp, and throw boomerangs in, which fall short, and then are joined by the other women, who bear bundles of sticks. They all move towards the men's camp, singing incantations. The boy is once more set astraddle on a man's shoulders and the men tramp to the women's site, where he is let down, while his guardian stands nearby. He is then made to stand, a foot on the each shoulder of the two men who support him, and shown to the women, who throw sticks their way. Then men swarm together and, with spears and shields, form a wall to hide him, and place him back on a man's shoulders and take him back to their camp, where he is again buried in leaves. A group of elders among the men, then return to the women's camp, and successively hand over, first clumps of grass, which the younger boys receive and hold at their chests, and then bundles of sticks, which they grasp after throwing the sheaves of grass away. The men then leave, gathered grass and place it back at their camp on the initiand, while the women pack up and shift camp several miles away. While doing so, they must sing certain songs and eat a restricted diet. The men return to their old camp, and hunt as preparations are made for the last stage, the goorooyoonbang.

A dozen men standing astride a twenty-foot pole, three or four inches in diameter, which had been prepared earlier, raise it simultaneously between their legs to knee-height, as the boy sits downcast near the fire. The pole is pointed his way, and the lead man has another on his shoulders, grimacing as he gesticulates wildly. The pole is then placed almost flush to the boy, who must look at it, and the tunnel of legs, and feints are made to thrust it into him, while obscene remarks are made. They back off, turn the pole 90 degrees, and swaying together, hold it before the novice. The pole is dropped with a thud, raised and dropped again several times, bringing the rite to an end.

He is rudely awoken by a din of boomerangs thumping shields near his head the following morning, shown a "stranger" who has been poised, grasping two branches, as if he were trampling on air, and then told to reveal to no one the secrets revealed. They then all return to the women's camp, save for the novice, who must approach it in slow steps, pitching his gunyah every evening closer until, finally, he can enter the men's camp.

== History of contact ==
Birrbay oral histories tell of the massacre of about 300 men, women and children around 1826 at Blackmans Point. There is no single written account, but the diary of Henry Lewis Wilson, who oversaw convicts in the area, relates that after two convicts sent to work at Blackmans Point were killed by Indigenous men, a party of soldiers "got round the blacks and shot a great many of them, captured a lot of women and used them for a immoral purpose and then shot them. The offending soldiers were sent to Sydney to be tried, but managed to escape punishment.". Historian Lyndall Ryan, after finding further corroborating written accounts, thinks that the Blackmans Point event referred to by Wilson involved around 20 people, but other massacres in the area may have caused the deaths of up to 300 people. Two or three of the massacres will be included in the official list of colonial massacres being compiled by the University of Newcastle.

The area around Taree was first settled by a naval man, William Wynter, who took up a selection of 2,560 acres (1,040 ha) there in 1831. Wynter appears to have had very amicable relations with the Birrbay, something inferred by the fact that his son William, who grew up among the Birrbay, was allowed to go hunting with them, and learnt their language. This is thought to bear witness to the peaceful character of the Indigenous peoples themselves. Three years later cedar-cutters were establishing camps along the Manning river.

The highland areas and the Falls country around the Manning and Hastings rivers were still sufficiently wild to serve the Aboriginal outlaw Jimmy Governor as a sanctuary at the turn of the 20th century.

== Alternative names ==
Tindale gives the following names:

- Biripi
- Birippi (?)
- Birrapee
- Birripai
- Birripi
- Bripi
- Brippai
- Waw-wyper

AIATSIS notes the following synonyms:

Birbay, Biribai, Biribi, Biripi, Birippi, Birpai, Birpay, Birrapee, Birrbay, Birripai, Birripi, Bripi, Brippai, Gathang, Kattang, Waw wyper, Worimi

== Notable people ==
- Josh Addo-Carr, rugby league footballer
- Latrell Mitchell, rugby league footballer
- Jade North, Australian soccer player, who revealed his identity after years of hiding it, by tattooing "Biripi" on his arm
- Nikita Ridgeway, tattoo artist and graphic designer
- Ella Simon, historic figure, leader, autobiography Through My Eyes
- Kyah Simon, international soccer player

== Some words ==
- belbora/baalbora (place of evil, name for a massacre site)
- bellbouri (type of tea-tree)
- baka (knee)
- groki (toad fish)
- kimbriki (water reeds)
- koribar (white cedar)
- kundibakh (wild apples)
- kureeki (ferns)
- djareebin (native fig fruit, hence the name Taree, where it was abundant)
- tigerah (ironbark)
