= Worimi languages =

Australian Aboriginal languages of New South Wales

Worimi
- Hunter–Hastings
- Geographic distribution: New South Wales
- Linguistic classification: Pama–Nyungan: Yuin–Kuric; Kuri; Worimi
- Subdivisions: Awabakal; Worimi

Language codes
- Glottolog: hunt1235

Worimi is a small family of two to five mostly extinct Australian Aboriginal languages of New South Wales.

- Awabakal, spoken around Lake Macquarie in New South Wales. Awabakal was studied by Reverend Lancelot Threlkeld from 1825 until his death in 1859, assisted by Biraban, the tribal leader, and parts of the Bible were translated into the language. For example, the Gospel of Mark begins: "Kurrikuri ta unni Evanelia Jesu úmba Krist koba, Yenal ta noa Eloi úmba." The language is currently in early stages of revival.
- Gadjang (Worimi), previously extinct, in the early stages of revitalisation, spoken by the Worimi people, from the eastern Port Stephens and Great Lakes regions of coastal New South Wales.

The languages are close enough to be accepted as related in the conservative classification of Dixon. Bowern (2011) considers Gadjang, Worimi, and Birrpayi to be separate languages.
