= Walter John Enright =

Walter John Enright (10 March 1874 – 27 September 1949) was an Australian solicitor and amateur anthropologist whose notes on the Aboriginals of New South Wales made an important contribution to the conservation of their traditions. His friendship with, and unstinting assistance to, the new generation of professional anthropologists working on mobs in New South Wales is still remembered.

== Life ==
Enright was born in West Maitland into a Catholic family, with an Irish background. He grew up among Aboriginal people around the Port Stephens district. He graduated with honours in geology and French in 1893, Professor Edgeworth David was an important early influence from those days until Enright's death. Professionally he qualified as a solicitor and went into practice in West Maitland. He was a member of numerous learned societies. Building on his familiarity with Port Stephen natives, he developed a more scholarly approach after reading the works of R. H. Mathews, on behalf of whom he carried out extensive work in his particular region of interest.

In the 1930s he introduced himself to A. P. Elkin, then at Morpeth, asking him for help in organising his research, which had been focused on the Worimi, in terms of anthropological method, since he himself had not the time to acquire the relevant methodologies of analysis. Numerous joint forays into the field followed, as Enright introduced Elkin to informants whom he thought would prove useful. Elkin subsequently published a paper on the Worimi, acknowledging Enright's assistance and wrote a laudatory obituary on the latter's demise.

== Bibliography ==
- Enright, Walter John (5 July 1899). "Initiation Ceremonies of the Aborigines of Port Stephens, N.S.W." (PDF). Journal and Proceedings of the Royal Society of New South Wales: 115–124.
- Enright, Walter John (1900). "The language, (Gadjang (also spelt Kattang, Kutthung, Gadhang, Gadang, Gathang), weapons and manufactures of the aborigines of Port Stephens" (PDF). Journal and Proceedings of the Royal Society of New South Wales. 34: 103–118.
- Enright, Walter John (March 1932). "The Kattang (Kutthung) or Worimi: An Aboriginal Tribe". Mankind: 75–77.
- Enright, W. J. (August 1932). "Social Divisions of the Birripai" (PDF). Mankind. 1 (5): 102.

== Sources ==
- Elkin, A. P. (March 1932). "Notes on the Social Organization of the Worimi, a Kattang-speaking people". Oceania. 2 (3): 359–363. doi:10.1002/j.1834-4461.1932.tb00034.x. JSTOR 27976153.
- Elkin, A. P. (February 1950). "Obituary: MR. W. J. ENRIGHT, B.A" (PDF). Mankind. 4 (43): 162–164.
- Enright, W. A. G. (1981) [First published 1966]. "Enright, Walter John (1874–1949)". Australian Dictionary of Biography. 1. Melbourne University Press.
