= Harrington, New South Wales =

Harrington New South Wales
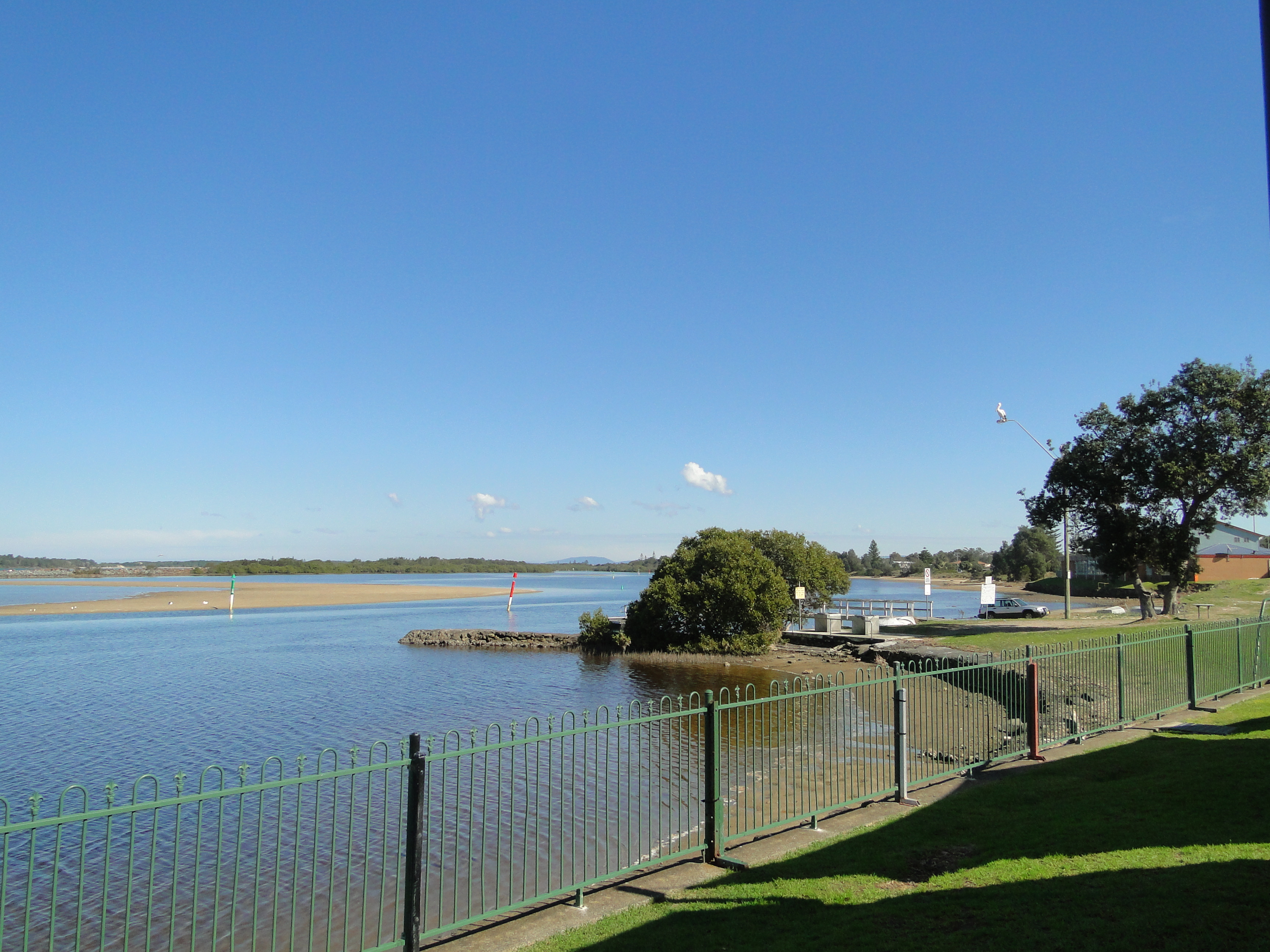
- Manning River at Harrington

- Coordinates: 31°52′S 152°41′E
- Population: 3,381 (2021 census)
- Postcode(s): 2427
- Elevation: 6 m (20 ft)
- Location: 335 km (208 mi) NE of Sydney; 73 km (45 mi) SW of Port Macquarie; 30 km (19 mi) NE of Taree
- LGA(s): Mid-Coast Council
- State electorate(s): Port Macquarie
- Federal division(s): Lyne
Mean max temp	Mean min temp	Annual rainfall
22.2 °C; 72 °F	13.0 °C; 55 °F	1,338.4 mm 52.7 in

Harrington is a fishing village located on the northern entrance of the Manning River in New South Wales, Australia. It was established in 1853 and proclaimed a village on 26 September 1896. It is 15 km north-east of Taree on the Mid North Coast, and 335 kilometres (208 mi) north east of the state capital, Sydney. At the 2021 census, Harrington had a population of 3,381. It was named after the Earl of Harrington by the explorer, John Oxley.

Historical population
Year	Pop.	±%
1966	543	—
1971	608	+12.0%
1976	896	+47.4%
1981	1,183	+32.0%
1986	1,234	+4.3%
1991	1,414	+14.6%
1996	1,397	−1.2%
2001	1,412	+1.1%
2006	1,753	+24.2%
2011	2,257	+28.8%
2016	2,896	+28.3%
2021	3,240	+11.9%
Source: Australian Bureau of Statistics data.

== Schools ==
- Harrington Public School

== Emergency Services ==
- Marine Rescue Crowdy Harrington
- SES
- RFS
