= Nowendoc, New South Wales =

Nowendoc
- Town
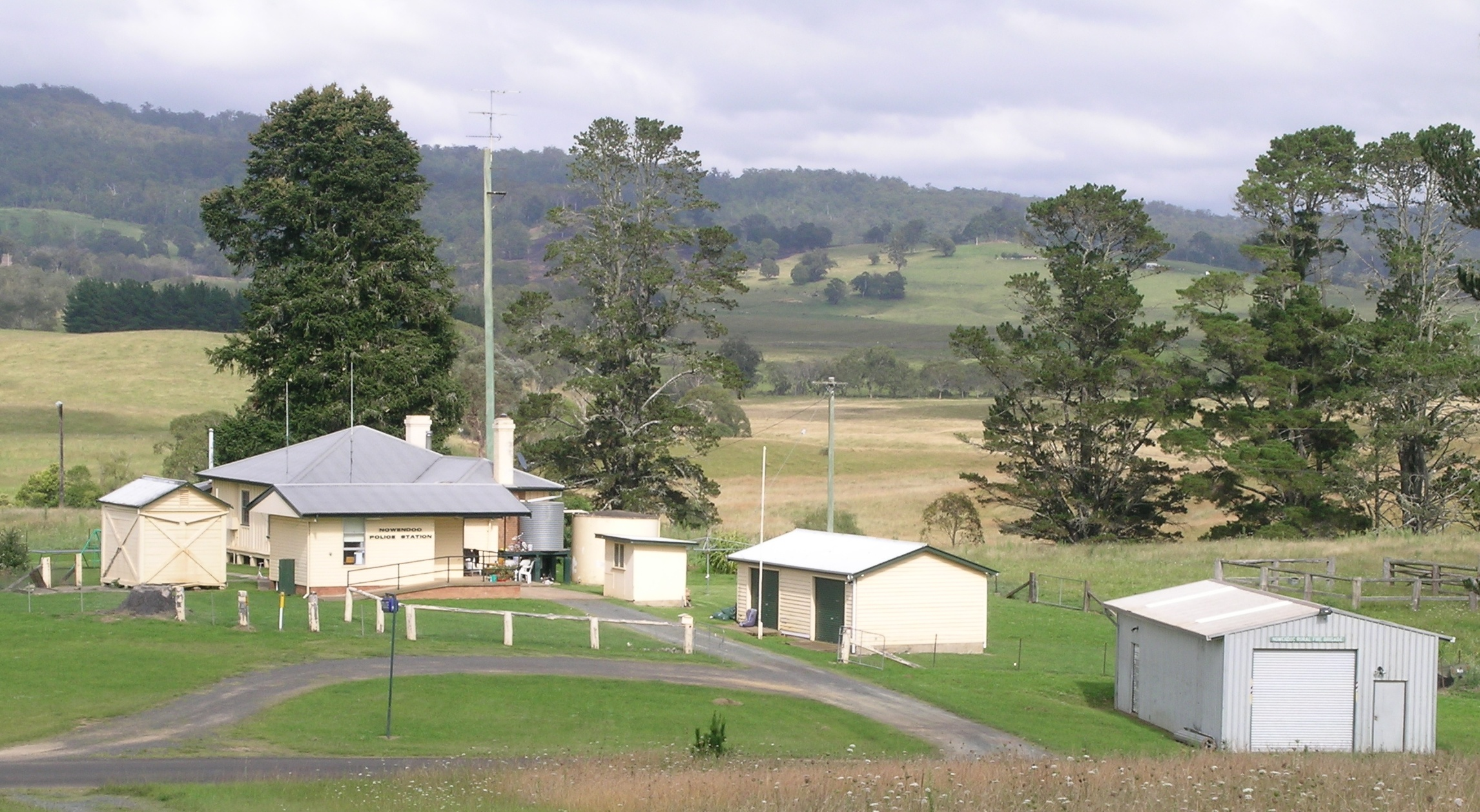
- Nowendoc Police Station and Rural Fire Service building on the right

- Coordinates: 31°31′S 151°44′E
- Country: Australia
- State: New South Wales
- LGA: Walcha Shire Council
- Location: 360 km (220 mi) N of Sydney; 109 km (68 mi) SE of Tamworth; 71 km (44 mi) S of Walcha
- Established: 1857

Government
  - State electorate: Northern Tablelands
  - Federal division: New England

Population
  - Total: 146 (2016 census)
- Postcode: 2354
- County: Hawes

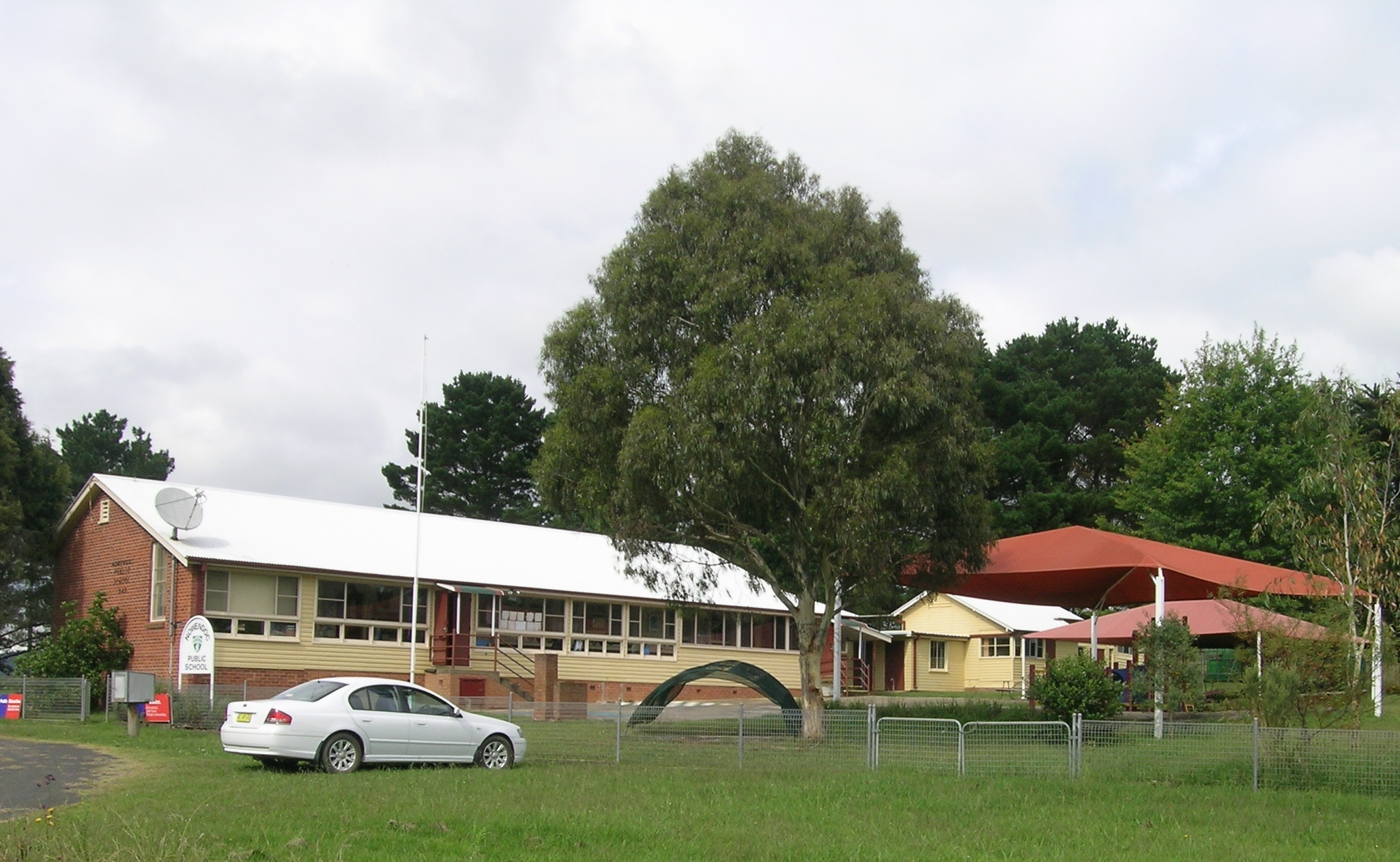
Nowendoc Public School

Nowendoc is a parish and village on the Northern Tablelands, New South Wales, Australia. It is 360 km north of the state capital, Sydney, and 66 km south of Walcha in the Walcha Shire local government area. A sealed road, Thunderbolts Way, is about three hundred metres to the south of Nowendoc and provides links to the south and north.

== History ==
In 1836 William Telfer marked a tree line from Gloucester through Giro on the Barnard River, over Hungry Hill to Nowendoc and on to Ogunbil via Whites Sugarloaf. The Australian Agricultural Company (AACo) set up stations and resting places for their travelling sheep along this route to be known as the ‘Peel Line’. During the years 1840 to 1845 Nowendoc was one of the AACo outstations for their sheep. In 1857 John Hall surveyed 39 allotments to define the village of Nowendoc. Thomas Laurie discovered alluvial gold there in 1872 and by 1873 there were about 100 people camping at Township Spur. By 1945 nearly all mining has ceased. Some dairying was done during the earlier years of settlement.

The name Nowendoc comes from a Worimi term meaning 'rough ground'.

The village has a cemetery, church, school, sports ground, store, police station, a New South Wales Rural Fire Service station and community hall. The store is trading and offers coffee, food and items for travellers. There is also a small motel on the edge of the village on the Taree road. A post office operated intermittently from 1861 to 1979. The completion of the telephone line to Walcha in 1921 reduced the isolation of the area. Rural electricity was supplied during 1964–65 to those who made the contribution of £248/10/– towards the cost of connection. The local Uniting Church was officially opened in 1976.

At the 2016 census, Nowendoc and the surrounding area had a population of 146. The main industries are beef cattle breeding and timber.

Nowendoc is a centre for those keen on bushwalking, fishing and similar activities and lies near the top of the escarpment that contains the bulk of the Barrington Tops National Park. Many scenic walks and drives can be easily accessed from Nowendoc with the Nowendoc National Park nearby. Tennis, football and cricket are popular sports that enjoyed by residents. An annual rodeo is held on the Nowendoc sports ground.

=== Manhunt ===
In late 2011 and early 2012 Nowendoc featured heavily in the media, as it was the base for a NSW Police manhunt for Malcolm Naden, who had been wanted by police for some six years. Up to 90 police were based in the village at the height of the operation. In late March 2012 Naden was captured by NSW Police about 30 km west of Gloucester.
