= Gathang language =

Australian Aboriginal language

Gathang
- Worimi, Lower North Coast
- Region: New South Wales
- Ethnicity: Worimi (Warrimay), Birrbay (Birpai), Guringay (Gringai)
- Extinct: late 20th century
- Revival: >1,000 (2018-19)
- Language family: Pama–Nyungan: Yuin–Kuric; Kuri; Worimi; Gathang
- Dialects: Gadjang (Kattang, Katthang, Gathang); Worimi (Warimi); Birbay (Birrpayi)

Language codes
- ISO 639-3: kda – inclusive code Individual code: xbj – Birrpayi
- Glottolog: wori1245 Worimi
- AIATSIS: E67
- ELP: Birrpayi
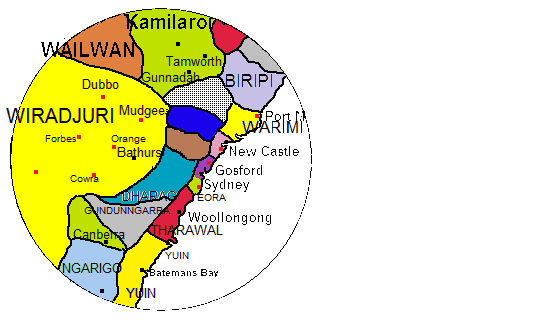
- Traditional lands of Australian Aboriginal tribes around Sydney, New South Wales; Worimi in yellow, on the right (Note: This map is indicative only.)

The Gathang language (also spelt Gadjang, Katang, Kattang, Kutthung, Gadhang, Gadang) is an Australian Aboriginal language or group of dialects. Dialects of this language include Birrbay, Guringay, Awabakal and Warrimay, which are used by the Worimi, Gringai, Awabakal and Birrbay peoples. It went extinct during the latter half of the 20th century, but has been revived in the 21st century.

== History and status ==
After the colonisation of Australia, many of the hundreds of Aboriginal languages fell into disuse. The Worimi people comprised 18 clan groups (ngurras), all of whom spoke Gathang. The four ngurras of the Port Stephens area moved to the settlement at Carrington to work at the Australian Agricultural Company, and over the years lost their language and culture as they learnt European ways. Many Worimi people were forced into missions and reserves.

In 1887: E.M. Curr published the first word list of the Gathang language, which had been compiled by John Branch, and in 1900, W.J. Enright published a description and word list. In 1929, American linguist Gerhardt Laves worked with Gathang speakers Charlie Briggs, Bill Dungie, Charlie Bugg, Jim Moy, Albert Lobban, Hannah Bugg, Susan Russell, Ted Lobban, and Mrs Russell. During the 1960s, Swedish linguist Nils Holmer made recordings of two Worimi elders, Eddie Lobban and Fred Bugg, and compiled a grammar of the Gathang language.

For many years the language was extinct, but revitalisation has been under way in the 21st century. In 2010, A Grammar and Dictionary of Gathang: The Language of the Birrbay, Guringay and Warrimay, by Amanda Lissarrague, was published, and the Muurrbay Aboriginal Language and Culture Co-operative started running classes in Taree, Forster, and Port Macquarie. The number of speakers soon grew, and classes were introduced at TAFEs, schools, and within family groups. As of 2014, there were 40 recorded speakers of the language, and by 2018-2019 there were more than a thousand, after work had been done on reviving the language. Today, books, songs, dance, storytelling, and language workshops are all used to help revive and preserve the language, and it is being studied at PhD level.

== Classification ==
Gathang is closely related to Awabakal, in the Yuin–Kuric group of Pama–Nyungan. Gathang is the language name covering three dialects: Birrbay, Guringay, and Warrimay.

== Phonology ==
The phonology of the language was recorded by Enright. The description that follows was extracted from the updated phonology by Amanda Lissarague (2010).

=== Vowels ===
	Front	Back
High	ɪ ⟨i⟩ iː ⟨ii⟩	ʊ ⟨u⟩ uː ⟨uu⟩
Low	ə ⟨a⟩ aː ⟨aa⟩	

There is also the diphthong "ay", pronounced [aj].

=== Consonants ===
		Bilabial	Velar	Dental	Palatal	Alveolar
Plosive	voiceless	p ⟨p⟩	k ⟨k⟩	t̪ ⟨th⟩	c ⟨tj⟩	t ⟨t⟩
Plosive	voiced	b ⟨b⟩	g ⟨g⟩	d̪ ⟨dh⟩	ɟ ⟨dj⟩	d ⟨d⟩
Nasal		m ⟨m⟩	ŋ ⟨ng⟩	n̪ ⟨nh⟩	ɲ ⟨ny/yn⟩	n ⟨n⟩
Lateral						l ⟨l⟩
Approximant		w ⟨w⟩			j ⟨y⟩	ɹ ⟨r⟩
Flap/Trill						ɾ~r ⟨rr⟩

Within the orthography, both voiceless and voiced stops are written, words begin with voiced stops only and only voiced stops may occur in consonant clusters or suffixes. There is some inconsistency in the orthography to choice of stop intervocalically. The dictionary/grammar written by Lissarrague prescribes voiceless stops intervocalically, but this is violated many times such as in magu - axe. The phonemes /p/ and /b/ may contrast, such as gaparr - baby, boy, and gabarr - head. This is unclear.

There is some evidence of a merger of the dental and palatal stops/nasals, with free variation existing in many words, such as djinggarr~dhinggarr - silver, grey.

At the end of a word, a nasal may also be pronounced as its corresponding stop. (E.g. bakan~bakat - rock).

Intervocalically, "b" may be pronounced as [v].

== Vocabulary ==
Some Gathang words are:

- Barrgan (boomerangs)
- Wamarr (woomeras
- Ganay (digging sticks)
- Garrigay (wild myrtle)
- Buwatja (food)
- Ngapuwi (freshwater)
- Duumala (creeks)
- Bami (rivers)
- Ganya (bark huts)
- Wirray (bush)

There are many place names in New South Wales which have names ascribed to them in the Gathang language, including:

- Birubi ("Southern Cross" or "view of the Southern Cross")
- Tanilba ("place of white flowers")
- Mallabula ("swampland between two mountains")
- Karuah ("place of native plum tree")
- Pindimar ("place of black possums")
