= Manning River =

River in New South Wales, Australia

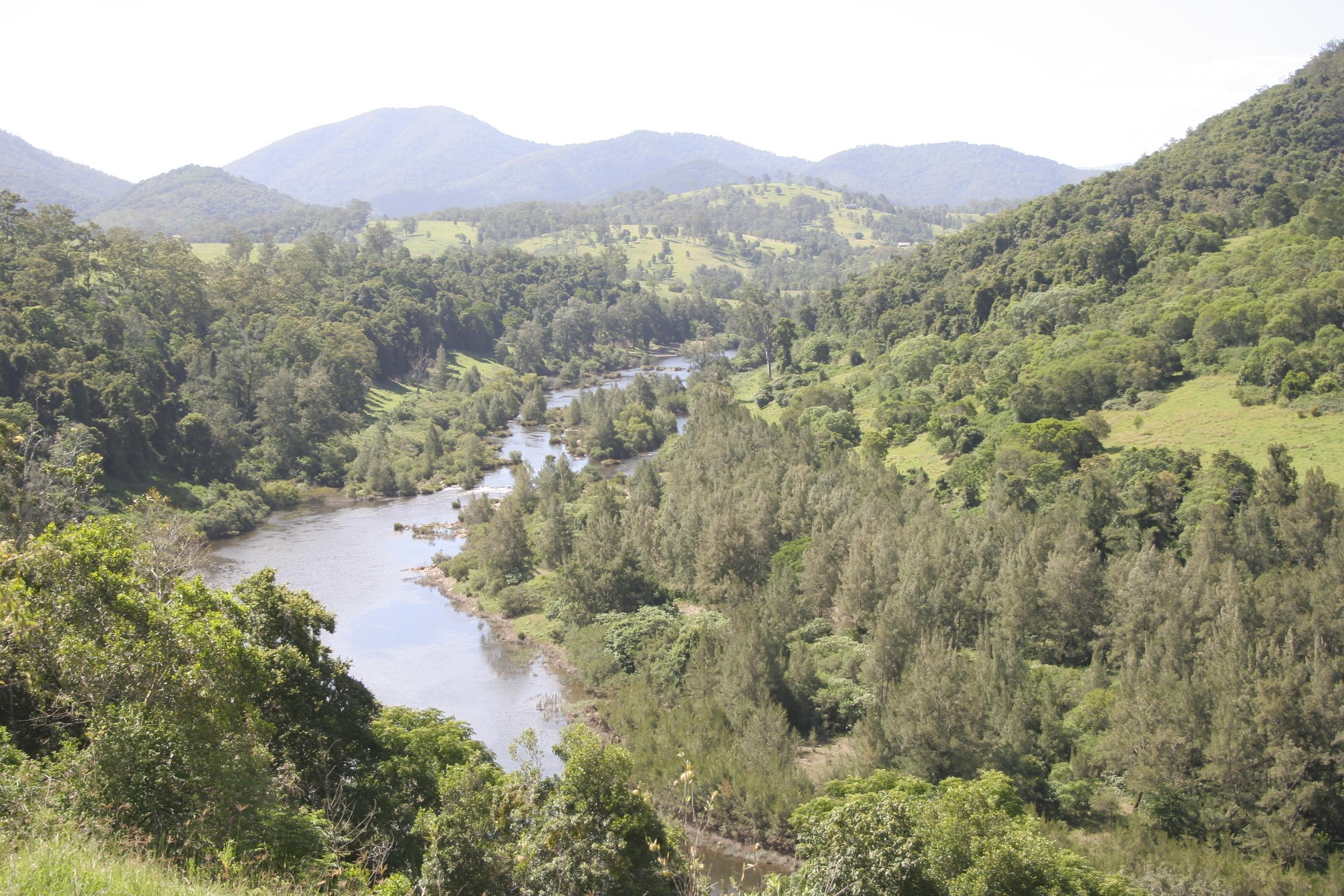
- Manning River, upstream of Mount George
- Etymology: In honour of Sir William Manning
- Native name: Boolumbahtee (Birrpayi)

Location
- Country: Australia
- State: New South Wales
- Region: New England Tablelands, NSW North Coast (IBRA), Northern Tablelands, Mid North Coast
- Local government area: Mid-Coast Council
- Towns: Wingham, Taree

Physical characteristics
- Source: Mount Barrington, Great Dividing Range
  - location: Barrington Tops National Park, near Ellerston
  - coordinates: 31°54′S 151°28′E
  - elevation: 1,500 m (4,900 ft)
- Mouth: Tasman Sea of the South Pacific Ocean
  - location: Old Bar and Harrington Point
  - coordinates: 31°53′S 152°42′E
  - elevation: 0 m (0 ft)
- Length: 261 km (162 mi)
- Basin size: 8,125 km^{2} (3,137 sq mi)
- Discharge
  - location: Near mouth
  - average: 63 m^{3}/s (2,000 GL/a)

Basin features
- Tributaries
  - left: Backwater Creek, Pigna Barney River, Barnard River, Nowendoc River, Connollys Creek, Bobin Creek, Dingo Creek, Cedar Party Creek, Dawson River, Lansdowne River
  - right: Gloucester River, Bakers Creek (New South Wales), Burrell Creek (New South Wales), Scotts Creek (New South Wales)
- National parks: Barrington Tops, Woko,

Manning River (Biripi: Boolumbahtee), an open and trained mature wave dominated barrier estuary, is located in the Northern Tablelands and Mid North Coast districts of New South Wales, Australia. It is the only double delta river in the southern hemisphere in which there are two permanent entrances to the river, one at Old Bar and another at Harrington, and is one of only two rivers in the world to have permanent multiple entrances (the other being the Nile in Egypt).

== Course and features ==
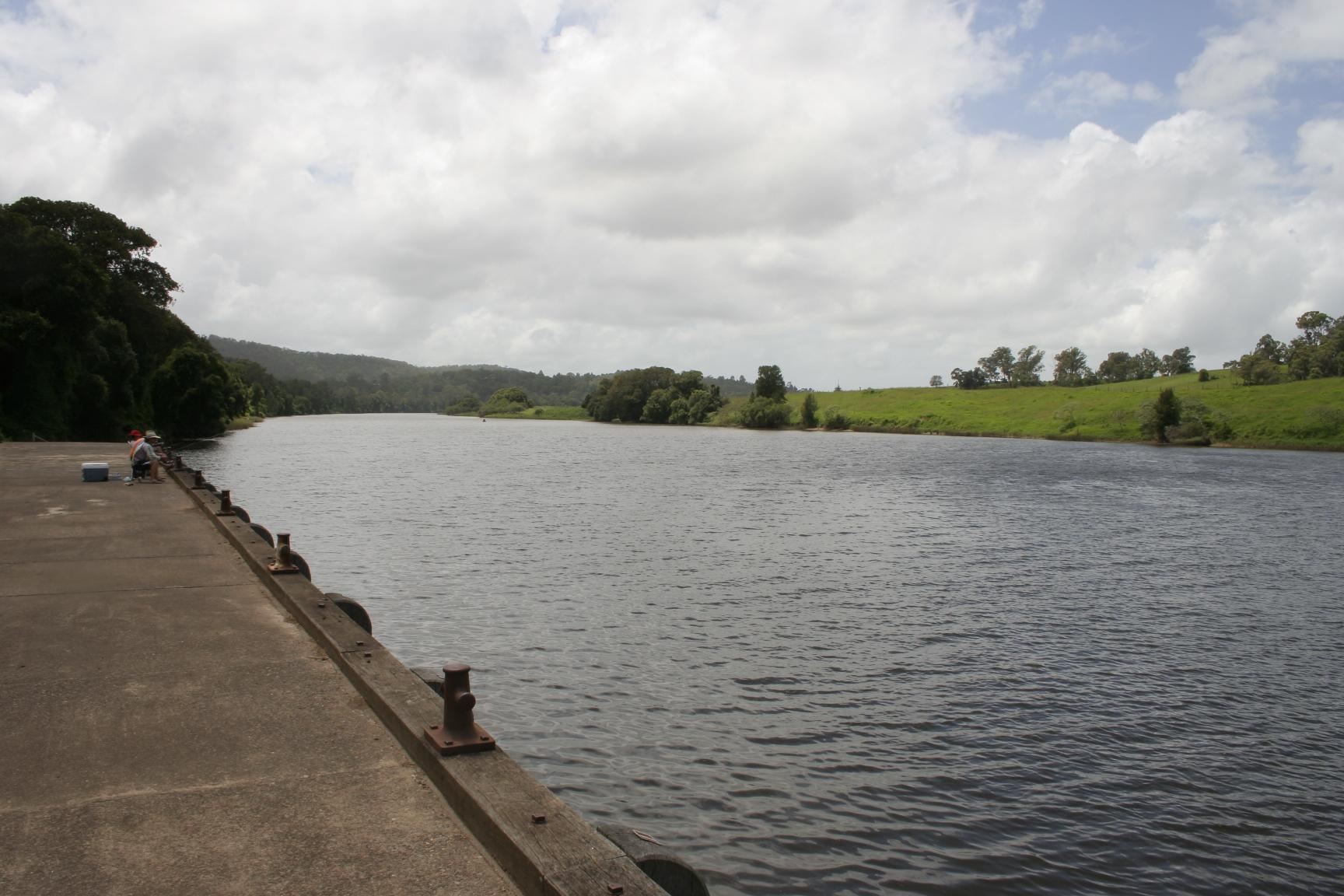
Cargo wharf at Wingham

Manning River rises below Mount Barrington, on the northeastern slopes of the Great Dividing Range within Barrington Tops National Park, east southeast of Ellerston, and flows generally southeast, joined by eleven tributaries, including the Pigna Barney, Barnard, Nowendoc, Gloucester, Dawson, and Lansdowne rivers, descending 1,500 metres (4,900 ft) over its 261-kilometre (162 mi) course from the high upper reaches, through the Manning Valley, and out to sea.

The river flows past the towns of Wingham and Taree. At Taree, the river splits and becomes a double delta. The southern arm reaches its mouth at the Tasman Sea of the South Pacific Ocean, near Old Bar. The northern arm is joined by the Dawson River and further downstream the Lansdowne River, reaching its mouth at the Tasman Sea, near Harrington Point, creating two separate entrances to the river: Harrington Inlet (north) and Farquhar Inlet (south). Within the delta there are several channels dividing coastal land into large islands, such as Mitchells and Oxley islands. Between Croki (in the north) and Cabbage Tree Island east of Bohnock (in the south), Scotts Creek links both the northern and southern passages of the river.

The Manning River is one of Australia's few large river systems that have not been dammed for water supply purposes anywhere along its catchment. The local water supply is fed by Bootawa Dam, which is an offsite dam, however, water is pumped from the river to the dam whenever river turbidity and flow levels can allow. A small weir is located in the upper reaches of the Barnard River, part of the inter-basin water transfer of the Barnard River Scheme, enabling water to be pumped into the Hunter River to meet the cooling needs of Bayswater and Liddell electric power stations. The scheme is shut down until needed but as of 2019 this scheme was decommissioned due to its rare use (with the last water transfer in 2011).

The Manning River is one of only a few Australian mainland rivers to receive annual winter melting snow deposits.

The Manning River is crossed by the Pacific Highway at two bridges: the Ella Simon Bridge near Taree, spanning the southern channel, and the Henry "Hawkeye" Edwards Bridge at Cundletown, spanning the northern channel. The river is also crossed by the North Coast railway line at the heritage-listed Manning River railway bridge at Mount George.

== History ==
The traditional custodians of the land surrounding the Manning River and its associated valley are the Australian Aboriginal Biripi, who named the river as Boolumbahtee, meaning a place where the brolgas played.

In 1818, John Oxley crossed and named Harrington and Farquhar inlets during a trip from the Hastings River, near Port Macquarie, to Port Stephens. The Manning River itself was first surveyed by Henry Dangar in 1825 and again in 1826 on behalf of the Australian Agricultural Company. Later in 1826, the river was named the Manning River by Robert Dawson for the Deputy Governor of the Australian Agricultural Company, William Manning. In the same year it was declared that the Manning was the northern limit of the Nineteen Counties, defining the areas of New South Wales where settlers were free to occupy.

Until 1913, ships servicing the coast brought goods and supplies up the river. Before modern roads were built, the Manning River effectively acted as a highway for moving people, timber, produce and supplies. Wingham was established at the furthest point supply boats could reach up the river and became the region's major port. Croki was another major transport hub, that served as a landing port. Trips by riverboats travelling between Sydney and Manning settlements were common, until the railway link to Sydney opened in 1913, and improved road connections had reduced the demand for river transport. Eventually Croki and Wingham ceased being thriving ports as river based transport became replaced by road and rail. The old cargo wharf at Wingham Brush has since been refurbished. The town of Tinonee was also settled on the river near Taree.

In 2008 a pod of bottle-nosed dolphins became stranded up stream from Wingham between Jackson and Abbotts Falls (visible from Brushy Cutting Lookout). Authorities observed, but did not intervene. Despite this area having adequate food, and a high level of water, all dolphins soon died stranded in this section of fresh and/or brackish water. This is assumed by specialists now to relate to low salinity water leading to fresh water skin disease. Necroscopies and water testing were not carried out.

In March 2021, a record breaking low pressure trough brought intense rainfall to the Manning Valley catchment area, inundating properties at Taree and Wingham. It peaked at 5.7 m (19 ft) in Taree, falling just short of the record 6 m (20 ft) flood of 1929.

In September 2023 a pod of five bottle-nosed dolphins became entrapped in a fresh water section of the Manning River, again between Jackson and Abbotts Falls. First observations reported one deceased dolphin, and the four surviving dolphins abnormal behaviour thrashing in deep sections of river and remaining circling within a small section of the river. Relevant authorities were notified. A period of observation of the dolphins was enacted. Water testing some days later revealed the water was fresh, and not brackish as had been presumed. Fresh water skin disease quickly developed in all dolphins as a result of prolonged fresh water exposure. Visual growths and deep lesions became evident, even from the shore, and the last surviving dolphins colours began to change. Rescue was formally enacted after three of the dolphins were found deceased. The fourth dolphin perished the day following, before rescue could be enacted. A skilled multidisciplinary team, carried out a successful and humane capture of the only surviving dolphin on 17 September 2023. Once captured, the final dolphin, who came to be known as Forest, was initially given medical clearance to travel to the Sea World Foundation in Queensland, to be rehabilitated. On full recovery Forest would have been released locally in the Mid Coast. Forest was sedated with specialist marine mammal vets and a team of volunteers alongside her. She was travelling in a specially equipped veterinary vehicle and was under sedation with the specialist team all around her when she died. Necroscopy showed prolonged exposure to fresh water conditions led to array of major health concerns, ultimately organ failure. The pod of five dolphins perished within 5.5-13.5 days of becoming entrapped in fresh water conditions. This event is being used to better understand fresh water skin disease internationally, and to support better outcomes if this happens again in this stretch of the Manning River.

In May 2025, after heavy rainfall in the Mid North Coast, the river at Taree broke an almost 100-year record where it passed 6 metres (20 ft).

== Ecology ==
The Manning River is a major producer of Australian oysters and is home to many fish species, including the yellowfin bream (Acanthopagrus australis). Dusky flathead (Platycephalus fuscus), a widespread Australian estuary fish is also present in the river. The freshwater prawn M. australiense has been recorded in high abundance in both natural mangrove forests and hybrid mangrove shorelines within the estuary.

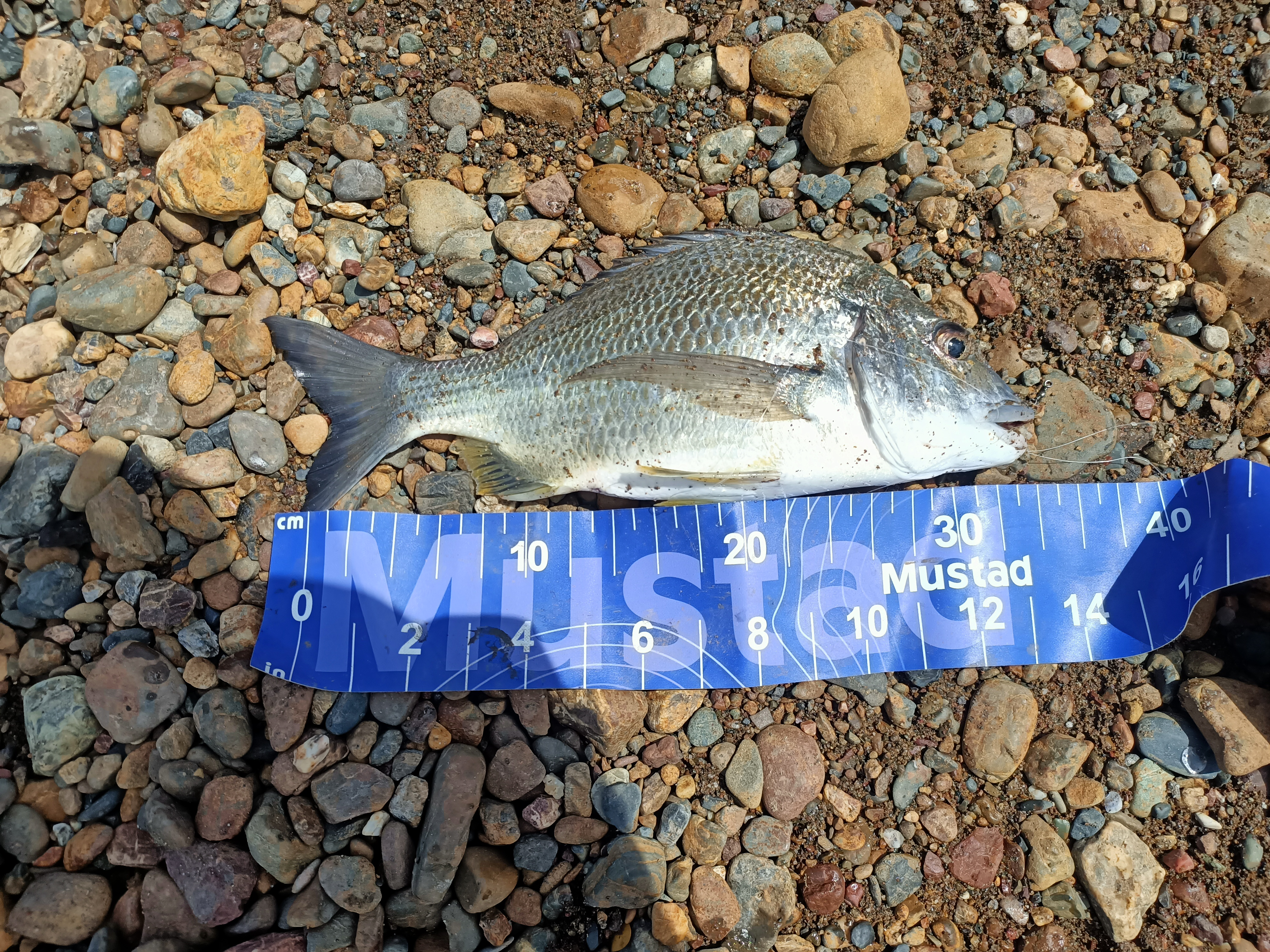
A yellowfin bream (Acanthopagrus australis) measuring approximately 35 cm, caught in the Manning River in 2026.

The river provides habitat for the endangered Manning River helmeted turtle (Myuchelys purvisi), which is endemic to its upper and middle catchments. Bull sharks have been caught and tagged in the river and it is not uncommon to find them as far upstream as Wingham, about 40 kms from the coast. Dolphins are also present however freshwater exposure has occasionally led to mortality events near Wingham. Whales also frequent the river, mainly at the larger Harrington Inlet, although some do enter the Farquar Inlet and generally do not venture far up river.

== Events and industry ==
Taree is home to the annual Manning River Summer Festival, which features rowing, and sailing. The Taree Powerboat Club Spectacular is held in the Manning River during the Easter long weekend.

The Manning Point Fishing Classic, held annually at Manning Point is the Australian leg of the Poissons et boisson extrêmes extreme fishing tour. The tour pits an invitation only collection of notorious fishers, known for their extreme dedication to the twin arts of fishing and drinking.

Commercial fishing and oyster farming are both practiced in the Manning. The peak season for oyster production is September to March; and the annual production during 2013 was 146,000 dozen. The link between Taree and the oyster industry is shown by the presence in Taree of the "Big Oyster", a building constructed in the shape of an open oyster shell.

The Manning River area is popular for domestic tourism.

== See also ==
- Manning River Skull
- Rivers of New South Wales
- List of rivers in New South Wales (L-Z)
- List of rivers of Australia
