= City of Greater Taree =

Former local government area in New South Wales, Australia

Greater Taree
- Local government area
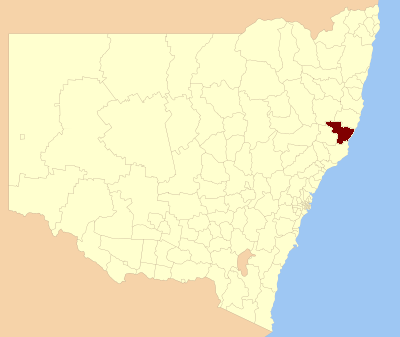
- Location in New South Wales
- Coordinates: 31°54′S 152°27′E
- Country: Australia
- State: New South Wales
- Region: Mid North Coast
- Established: 1981
- Abolished: 12 May 2016
- Council seat: Taree

Government
  - Mayor: Paul Hogan (Unaligned)
  - State electorates: Myall Lakes; Port Macquarie
  - Federal division: Lyne

Area
  - Total: 3,730 km^{2} (1,440 sq mi)

Population
  - Total: 46,541 (2011)
  - Density: 12.48/km^{2} (32.3/sq mi)
- Website: Greater Taree
LGAs around Greater Taree
Walcha	Port Macquarie-Hastings	Tasman Sea
Gloucester	Greater Taree	Tasman Sea
Gloucester	Great Lakes	Tasman Sea

The Greater Taree City Council (GTCC) was a local government area on the Mid North Coast of New South Wales, Australia, until 12 May 2016 when it was amalgamated to form part of the Mid-Coast Council. It was originally formed in 1981 from the Manning Shire, and the Taree and Wingham Municipal Councils. The council was centred on Taree, located adjacent to the Manning River, the Pacific Highway and the North Coast railway line.

The last serving mayor of GTCC was Paul Hogan, an unaligned politician.

== Towns and localities ==
Towns and localities included in the former GTCC were:

- Taree
- Bobin
- Bohnock
- Brinawa
- Burrell Creek
- Cedar Party
- Coopernook
- Coralville
- Croki
- Crowdy Head
- Cundletown
- Diamond Beach
- Dumaresq Island
- Dyers Crossing
- Elands
- Ghinni Ghinni
- Glenwarrin
- Hallidays Point
- Hannam Vale
- Harrington
- Johns River
- Jones Island
- Kippaxs
- Killabakh
- Kolodong
- Koorainghat
- Krambach
- Langley Vale
- Lansdowne
- Manning Point
- Marlee
- Mitchells Island
- Mooral Creek
- Moorland
- Mount George
- Old Bar
- Oxley Island
- Pampoolah
- Possum Brush
- Purfleet
- Rawson River
- Rocks Crossing
- Stewarts River
- Tinonee
- Upper Lansdowne
- Waitui
- Wallabi Point
- Wang Wauk
- Wherrol Flat
- Wingham

== Demographics ==
At the last 2011 Census performed for the local government area, there were 46,541 people in the GTCC government area, of these 48.7% were male and 51.3% were female. Aboriginal and Torres Strait Islander people made up 5.4% of the population, double the national average. The median age of people in the City of Greater Taree was 46 years; some nine years higher than the national median. Children aged 0 – 14 years made up 18.6% of the population and people aged 65 years and over made up 22.5% of the population. Of people in the area aged 15 years and over, 50.0% were married and 14.8% were either divorced or separated.

Population growth in the GTCC between the 2001 Census and the 2006 Census has been 5.39%; and in the subsequent five years was 3.09%. When compared with total population growth of Australia for the same periods, being 5.78% and 8.32% respectively, population growth in the GTCC local government area was significantly lower than the national average. The median weekly income for residents within the GTCC was significantly below the national average, being one of the factors that place the GTCC in an area of social disadvantage.

At the 2011 Census, the last to be performed for the former council, the proportion of residents in the local government area who stated their ancestry as Australian or Anglo-Saxon exceeded 83% of all residents (national average was 65.2%). In excess of 62% of all residents in the GTCC had nominated a religious affiliation with Christianity at the 2011 Census, which was higher than the national average of 50.2%. Meanwhile, as at the Census date, compared to the national average, households in the GTCC government area had a significantly lower than average proportion (3.4%) where two or more languages are spoken (national average was 20.4%); and a significantly higher proportion (93.3%) where English only was spoken at home (national average was 76.8%).

Selected historical census data for Greater Taree local government area
Census year		2001	2006	2011
Population	Estimated residents on Census night	42,838	45,145	46,541
Population	LGA rank in terms of size within New South Wales			
Population	% of New South Wales population			0.67%
Population	% of Australian population	0.23%	0.23%	▼0.22%
Cultural and language diversity				
Ancestry, top responses	Australian			34.3%
Ancestry, top responses	English			33.1%
Ancestry, top responses	Irish			8.0%
Ancestry, top responses	Scottish			7.6%
Ancestry, top responses	German			2.9%
Language, top responses (other than English)	German	0.2%	0.2%	▲0.3%
Language, top responses (other than English)	Italian	0.2%	▼0.1%	0.1%
Language, top responses (other than English)	Dutch	0.2%	0.2%	▼0.1%
Language, top responses (other than English)	Cantonese	0.1%	▲0.2%	▼0.1%
Language, top responses (other than English)	French	n/c	n/c	▲0.1%
Religious affiliation				
Religious affiliation, top responses	Anglican	34.9%	▼33.3%	▼32.3%
Religious affiliation, top responses	Catholic	20.0%	▲20.1%	▼19.2%
Religious affiliation, top responses	No Religion	11.5%	▲14.8%	▲18.4%
Religious affiliation, top responses	Uniting Church	8.7%	▼7.5%	▼6.8%
Religious affiliation, top responses	Presbyterian and Reformed	5.1%	▼4.7%	▼4.4%
Median weekly incomes				
Personal income	Median weekly personal income		A$336	A$395
Personal income	% of Australian median income		72.1%	68.5%
Family income	Median weekly family income		A$635	A$930
Family income	% of Australian median income		61.8%	62.8%
Household income	Median weekly household income		A$798	A$770
Household income	% of Australian median income		68.1%	62.4%

== Council ==
GTCC was last formed with nine councillors, including the mayor, for a fixed four-year term of office. The mayor was directly elected while eight other councillors were elected proportionally as one entire ward. The last election was held on 8 September 2012, and the makeup of the council when it was amalgamated into the Mid-Coast Council, including the mayor, was as follows:

Party	Councillors
Independents and Unaligned	9
Total	9

The current council, elected in 2012, in order of election, is:

Councillor	Party	Notes
Paul Hogan	Unaligned	Mayor
Trent Jennison	Unaligned	Elected on Paul Hogan's ticket
Peter Epov	Independent	
Kathryn Bell	Independent	
Alan Tickle	Unaligned	
David Keegan	Independent	
Brad Christensen	Independent	
David West	Unaligned	
Robyn Jenkins	Unaligned	

== History ==
The first movement to establish the GTCC began in November 1959. The Taree Municipal Council applied to the Department of Local Government to extend its boundaries to the coastal area between Old Bar and Seal Rocks.

At an inquiry of the Boundaries Commission at Taree in 1976, the Dungog Shire proposed that the areas covered by the shires of Dungog, Gloucester, Great Lakes and Manning and the municipalities of Taree and Wingham be combined into two areas "to elevate local government to its proper role". At this stage, Taree Municipal Council proposed only their merger with the Municipality of Wingham. A decision was postponed for five years. Due to the town of Taree not having a town hall, the Taree Municipal Council could not be renamed to The Greater Taree City Council as planned. By merging the Municipality of Taree and Municipality of Wingham together so that Taree could claim the town hall in Wingham as they own, only then could the formation of the Greater Taree City Council be formed.

On 1 January 1981, the City of Greater Taree was proclaimed, encompassing the Municipalities of Taree and Wingham and the Manning Valley Shire.

A 2015 review of local government boundaries by the NSW Government Independent Pricing and Regulatory Tribunal had recommended the merger of a number of adjoining councils. In the initial proposal, the City of Greater Taree was not included in any amalgamation proposals. The amalgamation of the Gloucester, Great Lakes and Greater Taree councils was proclaimed on 12 May 2016, and followed the submission for such an amalgamation by Gloucester Shire Council.
