= Great Lakes Council =

Former local government area in New South Wales, Australia

- Local government area
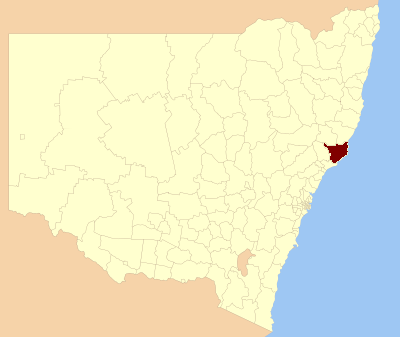
- Location in New South Wales
- Coordinates: 32°13′S 152°32′E
- Country: Australia
- State: New South Wales
- Region: Hunter, Mid North Coast
- Established: 7 March 1906
- Abolished: 12 May 2016
- Council seat: Forster

Government
  - Mayor: Jan McWilliams
  - State electorates: Myall Lakes; Upper Hunter; Port Stephens
  - Federal division: Paterson

Area
  - Total: 3,376 km^{2} (1,303 sq mi)

Population
  - Total: 34,430 (2011 census)
  - Density: 10.1985/km^{2} (26.414/sq mi)
- Time zone: UTC+10 (AEST)
  - Summer (DST): UTC+11 (AEDT)
- Website: Great Lakes Council
LGAs around Great Lakes Council
Gloucester	Greater Taree	Greater Taree
Dungog	Great Lakes Council	Tasman Sea
Port Stephens	Port Stephens	Tasman Sea

Great Lakes Council (trading as Great Lakes Shire) was a local government area in the Mid North Coast region of New South Wales, Australia. The area is situated adjacent to the shores of Port Stephens, Myall Lakes and Wallis Lake and the Pacific Highway and the Lakes Way. On 12 May 2016 the council was dissolved and the area included in the Mid-Coast Council, along with the City of Greater Taree and Gloucester Shire. From 7 March 1906 to 25 September 1971 it was known as Stroud Shire.

The Great Lakes area is home to the globally significant, Ramsar Convention listed Myall Lakes wetlands. These wetlands are an important foundation for the economies of the former suburbs of the Great Lakes Council local government area, particularly the recreational fisheries and tourism sectors.

== Amalgamation ==
A 2015 review of local government boundaries by the NSW Government Independent Pricing and Regulatory Tribunal recommended the merger of a number of adjoining councils. In the initial proposal, the Great Lakes Council was not included in any amalgamation proposals. However, Gloucester Shire Council submitted an alternate proposal to amalgamate the Gloucester, Great Lakes and Greater Taree councils. The outcome of an independent review was completed by May 2016, when the council was dissolved.

== Towns and localities ==
The former Great Lakes Council included the following towns and localities:

- Allworth
- Blueys Beach
- Bombah Point
- Boolambayte
- Boomerang Beach
- Booral
- Booti Booti
- Bulahdelah
- Bundabah
- Bungwahl
- Bunyah
- Carrington
- Charlotte Bay
- Coolongolook
- Coomba Bay
- Coomba Park
- Crawford River
- Darawank
- Elizabeth Beach
- Failford
- Forster
- Girvan
- Green Point
- Hawks Nest
- Limeburners Creek
- Markwell
- Mayers Flat
- Minimbah
- Monkerai
- Mungo Brush
- Myall Lake
- Nabiac
- Nerong
- Nooroo
- North Arm Cove
- Pindimar
- Sandbar
- Seal Rocks
- Shallow Bay
- Smiths Lake
- Stroud Road
- Stroud
- Tahlee
- Tarbuck Bay
- Tea Gardens
- Terreel
- The Branch
- Tiona
- Topi Topi
- Tuncurry
- Upper Karuah River
- Upper Myall
- Violet Hill
- Wallingat
- Wallis Lake
- Wards River
- Warranulla
- Washpool
- Weismantels
- Whoota
- Willina
- Wootton
- Yagon

== Demographics ==
At the 2011 census, there were 34,430 people in the Great Lakes Council local government area, of these 49.0 per cent were male and 51.0 per cent were female. Aboriginal and Torres Strait Islander people made up 3.8 per cent of the population, which was higher than the national and state averages of 2.5 per cent. The median age of people in the Great Lakes Council area was 52 years, significantly higher than the national median of 37 years; and the highest median of any local government area in New South Wales. Children aged 0 – 14 years made up 15.4 per cent of the population; and people aged 65 years and over made up 30.6 per cent of the population, with the latter significantly influencing the median age. Of people in the area aged 15 years and over, 52.4 per cent were married and 15.0 per cent were either divorced or separated.

Population growth in the Great Lakes Council between the 2001 census and the 2006 census was 4.00 per cent; and in the subsequent five years to the 2011 census, population growth was 5.08 per cent. When compared with total population growth of Australia for the same periods, being 5.78 per cent and 8.32 per cent respectively, population growth in the Great Lakes Council local government area was significantly lower than the national average. The median weekly income for residents within the Great Lakes Council area was nearly half the national average.

At the 2011 census, the proportion of residents in the Great Lakes Council local government area who stated their ancestry as Australian or Anglo-Saxon exceeded 82 per cent of all residents (national average was 65.2 per cent). In excess of 66% of all residents in the Great Lakes Council area nominated a religious affiliation with Christianity at the 2011 census, which was significantly higher than the national average of 50.2 per cent. Meanwhile, as at the census date, compared to the national average, households in the Great Lakes Council local government area had a significantly lower than average proportion (3.6 per cent) where two or more languages are spoken (national average was 20.4 per cent); and a significantly higher proportion (92.6 per cent) where English only was spoken at home (national average was 76.8 per cent).

Selected historical census data for the Great Lakes Council local government area
Census year		2001	2006	2011
Population	Estimated residents on Census night	31,266	32,766	34,430
Population	LGA rank in terms of size within New South Wales			
Population	% of New South Wales population			0.50%
Population	% of Australian population	0.17%	0.17%	▼0.16%
Cultural and language diversity				
Ancestry, top responses	English			34.2%
Ancestry, top responses	Australian			32.5%
Ancestry, top responses	Irish			8.6%
Ancestry, top responses	Scottish			7.6%
Ancestry, top responses	German			2.7%
Language, top responses (other than English)	German	0.1%	▲0.3%	▲0.4%
Language, top responses (other than English)	Italian	0.2%	0.2%	▲0.3%
Language, top responses (other than English)	Cantonese	0.2%	▼0.1%	0.1%
Language, top responses (other than English)	Dutch	0.1%	0.1%	0.1%
Language, top responses (other than English)	French	0.1%	0.1%	0.1%
Religious affiliation				
Religious affiliation, top responses	Anglican	38.1%	▼35.8%	▼34.0%
Religious affiliation, top responses	Catholic	22.1%	▲22.4%	▼22.3%
Religious affiliation, top responses	No Religion	11.3%	▲13.9%	▲16.8%
Religious affiliation, top responses	Uniting Church	7.4%	▼6.6%	▼6.0%
Religious affiliation, top responses	Presbyterian and Reformed	4.5%	▼4.1%	▼3.9%
Median weekly incomes				
Personal income	Median weekly personal income		A$338	A$395
Personal income	% of Australian median income		72.5%	▼68.5%
Family income	Median weekly family income		A$747	A$881
Family income	% of Australian median income		63.8%	▼59.5%
Household income	Median weekly household income		A$611	A$729
Household income	% of Australian median income		59.5%	▼59.1%

== Council ==
=== Former composition and election method ===
At the time of its dissolution, the Great Lakes Council was composed of nine councillors elected proportionally as a single ward. All councillors were elected for a fixed four-year term of office. The mayor was elected by the councillors at the first meeting of the council. The most recent and last election was held on 8 September 2012 and the makeup of the council was as follows:

Party	Councillors
Independents and Unaligned	8
Labor Party	1
Total	9

The last Council, elected in 2012 and dissolved in 2016, in order of election, was:

Councillor	Party	Notes
Jan McWilliams	Independent	Mayor
Len Roberts	Unaligned	
Karen Hutchinson	Independent	Elected on Jan McWilliams's ticket
Tony Summers	Independent	
Linda Gill	Independent	
John Weate	Country Labor	
Leigh Vaughan	Unaligned	
Jim Morwitch	Independent	
Carol McCaskie	Unaligned	Elected on Len Roberts's ticket
