= Electoral results for the district of Myall Lakes =

Election results for Myall Lakes, New South Wales, Australia

Myall Lakes, an electoral district of the Legislative Assembly in the Australian state of New South Wales, was established in 1988.

== Members ==
Election	Member	Party
1988	John Turner	National
1991	John Turner	National
1995	John Turner	National
1999	John Turner	National
2003	John Turner	National
2007	John Turner	National
2011	Stephen Bromhead	National
2015	Stephen Bromhead	National
2019	Stephen Bromhead	National
2023	Tanya Thompson	National

== Election results ==
=== Elections in the 2020s ===
==== 2023 ====
2023 New South Wales state election: Myall Lakes
Party	Candidate	Votes	%	±%
National	Tanya Thompson	24,809	47.1	−1.5
Independent	Jason Bendall	9,567	18.2	+18.2
Labor	Mark Vanstone	9,460	18.0	−11.2
Legalise Cannabis	Keys Manley	4,747	9.0	+9.0
Greens	Eleanor Spence	2,843	5.4	−0.2
Sustainable Australia	Maree McDonald-Pritchard	1,260	2.4	+0.7
Total formal votes		52,686	96.7	+0.1
Informal votes		1,786	3.3	−0.1
Turnout		54,472	88.8	−1.7
Two-party-preferred result
National	Tanya Thompson	28,362	65.8	+6.5
Labor	Mark Vanstone	14,731	34.2	−6.5
National hold		Swing	+6.5	

=== Elections in the 2010s ===
==== 2019 ====
2019 New South Wales state election: Myall Lakes
Party	Candidate	Votes	%	±%
National	Stephen Bromhead	24,367	48.43	+1.56
Labor	David Keegan	14,691	29.20	+1.26
Independent	Paul Sandilands	4,169	8.29	+8.29
Shooters, Fishers, Farmers	Heather Elliott	3,518	6.99	+6.99
Greens	Ellie Spence	2,797	5.56	−1.04
Sustainable Australia	Quentin Bye	773	1.54	+1.54
Total formal votes		50,315	96.70	−0.33
Informal votes		1,715	3.30	+0.33
Turnout		52,030	90.19	−0.56
Two-party-preferred result
National	Stephen Bromhead	25,990	59.19	+0.45
Labor	David Keegan	17,916	40.81	−0.45
National hold		Swing	+0.45	

==== 2015 ====
2015 New South Wales state election: Myall Lakes
Party	Candidate	Votes	%	±%
National	Stephen Bromhead	22,617	46.9	−17.7
Labor	David Keegan	13,483	27.9	+15.2
Independent	Steve Attkins	7,295	15.1	+15.1
Greens	Stephen Ballantine	3,186	6.6	−0.4
Christian Democrats	Andrew Weatherstone	1,158	2.4	+2.4
No Land Tax	Giovina Gouskos	515	1.1	+1.1
Total formal votes		48,254	97.0	+0.2
Informal votes		1,475	3.0	−0.2
Turnout		49,729	90.8	+0.4
Two-party-preferred result
National	Stephen Bromhead	24,370	58.7	−19.9
Labor	David Keegan	17,115	41.3	+19.9
National hold		Swing	−19.9	

==== 2011 ====
2011 New South Wales state election: Myall Lakes
Party	Candidate	Votes	%	±%
National	Stephen Bromhead	29,679	64.6	+15.4
Independent	Steve Attkins	6,186	13.5	+13.5
Labor	David Petroulakis	5,904	12.8	−7.5
Greens	Greg Smith	3,084	6.7	+0.7
Independent	Barry Wright	1,116	2.4	+2.4
Total formal votes		45,969	97.4	−0.7
Informal votes		1,230	2.6	+0.7
Turnout		47,199	93.5	
Notional two-party-preferred count
National	Stephen Bromhead	31,658	78.6	+11.2
Labor	David Petroulakis	8,629	21.4	−11.2
Two-candidate-preferred result
National	Stephen Bromhead	30,821	74.9	+7.5
Independent	Steve Attkins	10,311	25.1	+25.1
National hold		Swing	+7.5	

=== Elections in the 2000s ===
==== 2007 ====
2007 New South Wales state election: Myall Lakes
Party	Candidate	Votes	%	±%
National	John Turner	21,640	49.2	+11.2
Labor	Lisa Clancy	8,970	20.4	+0.1
Independent	Eddie Loftus	8,318	18.9	+18.9
Greens	Judy Donnelly	2,640	6.0	+1.7
Independent	John Stephens	1,458	3.3	+3.3
AAFI	Waldron Perry	990	2.2	+1.1
Total formal votes		44,016	98.1	0.0
Informal votes		870	1.9	0.0
Turnout		44,886	93.4	
Two-party-preferred result
National	John Turner	23,779	67.4	+3.5
Labor	Lisa Clancy	11,505	32.6	−3.5
National hold		Swing	+3.5	

==== 2003 ====
2003 New South Wales state election: Myall Lakes
Party	Candidate	Votes	%	±%
National	John Turner	18,745	43.8	−7.5
Labor	Lisa Clancy	9,661	22.6	−6.8
Independent	Mick Tuck	5,198	12.1	+12.1
Independent	John Chadban	4,793	11.2	+11.2
Greens	Linda Gill	1,901	4.4	+0.2
One Nation	Colleen Burston	733	1.7	−11.9
Fishing Party	Paul Hennelly	620	1.4	+1.4
AAFI	Barry Moulds	474	1.1	−0.4
Independent	Ian McCaffrey	471	1.1	+1.1
Democrats	Vickie Lantry	226	0.5	+0.5
Total formal votes		42,822	98.0	−0.3
Informal votes		871	2.0	+0.3
Turnout		43,693	92.3	
Two-party-preferred result
National	John Turner	19,832	65.4	+2.5
Labor	Lisa Clancy	10,471	34.6	−2.5
National hold		Swing	+2.5	

=== Elections in the 1990s ===
==== 1999 ====
1999 New South Wales state election: Myall Lakes
Party	Candidate	Votes	%	±%
National	John Turner	20,841	51.3	−3.6
Labor	Mike Tuffy	11,922	29.4	+2.0
One Nation	Jason Deeney	5,522	13.6	+13.6
Greens	Linda Gill	1,717	4.2	−2.0
AAFI	Ken Spragg	591	1.5	−4.9
Total formal votes		40,593	98.3	+3.0
Informal votes		701	1.7	−3.0
Turnout		41,294	94.5	
Two-party-preferred result
National	John Turner	22,531	62.9	−4.3
Labor	Mike Tuffy	13,314	37.1	+4.3
National hold		Swing	−4.3	

==== 1995 ====
1995 New South Wales state election: Myall Lakes
Party	Candidate	Votes	%	±%
National	John Turner	21,213	60.4	−1.0
Labor	Leellen Lewis	9,159	26.1	−1.3
AAFI	John Bridge	2,477	7.1	+7.1
Greens	Linda Gill	2,269	6.5	+6.5
Total formal votes		35,118	95.3	+1.6
Informal votes		1,736	4.7	−1.6
Turnout		36,854	94.8	
Two-party-preferred result
National	John Turner	22,781	68.4	−0.2
Labor	Leellen Lewis	10,531	31.6	+0.2
National hold		Swing	−0.2	

==== 1991 ====
1991 New South Wales state election: Myall Lakes
Party	Candidate	Votes	%	±%
National	John Turner	19,535	61.4	+0.1
Labor	Frank Rigby	8,711	27.4	+4.1
Democrats	Paul Moritz	1,942	6.1	+2.5
Call to Australia	Terrence Hazell	1,609	5.1	+5.1
Total formal votes		31,797	93.7	−3.7
Informal votes		2,155	6.3	+3.7
Turnout		33,952	94.6	
Two-party-preferred result
National	John Turner	21,086	68.6	−3.7
Labor	Frank Rigby	9,636	31.4	+3.7
National hold		Swing	−3.7	

=== Elections in the 1980s ===
==== 1988 ====
1988 New South Wales state election: Myall Lakes
Party	Candidate	Votes	%	±%
National	John Turner	16,522	52.6	−2.6
Labor	Andrew Baker	7,119	22.7	−16.3
Independent	Knox Greenaway	5,841	18.6	+18.6
Democrats	Amelia Newman	1,923	6.1	+6.1
Total formal votes		31,405	97.4	−1.0
Informal votes		852	2.6	+1.0
Turnout		32,257	94.9	
Two-party-preferred result
National	John Turner	20,001	69.9	+9.2
Labor	Andrew Baker	8,594	30.1	−9.2
National notional hold		Swing	+9.2	
