= Green Point, Mid-North Coast =

Green Point
- Suburb
- Interactive map of Green Point
- Coordinates: 32°14′51″S 152°30′50″E
- Country: Australia
- State: New South Wales
- Region: Mid North Coast
- LGA: MidCoast Council
- Location: 301 km (187 mi) NNE of Sydney; 153 km (95 mi) NNE of Newcastle; 10 km (6.2 mi) S of Forster; 121 km (75 mi) SSW of Port Macquarie

Government
  - State electorate: Myall Lakes
  - Federal division: Lyne

Population
  - Total: 522 (2021 census)
- Time zone: UTC+10 (AEST)
  - Summer (DST): UTC+11 (AEDT)
- Postcode: 2428
- County: Gloucester
Suburbs around Green Point
Wallis Island	Forster	Tasman Sea
Coomba Park	Green Point	Tasman Sea
Whoota	Pacific Palms	Tasman Sea

Green Point is a small coastal locality in the Mid North Coast region of New South Wales, on country of the Worimi People, Australia, in the Mid-Coast Council LGA, about 301 km north-north-east of Sydney.

== Geography ==
Green Point is a locality 10 km south of Forster. It is bounded by Wallis Lake to the west and Booti Booti National Park to the east.

== Demographics ==
The 2021 Census by the Australian Bureau of Statistics counted 522 people in Green Point on census night. Of these, 51% were male, whilst 49% were female.

The majority of residents (77.6%) are of Australian birth, with other common responses being England (6.9%), New Zealand (2.1%) and Germany (1%).

The age distribution of Green Point residents is skewed higher than the greater Australian population. 79% of residents were over 25 years in 2021, compared to the Australian average of 69.8%; and 21% were younger than 25 years, compared to the Australian average of 30.2%.

7.9% of respondents identified as Indigenous Australians.

== Transportation ==
=== Roads ===
Green Point is connected to The Lakes Way via Green Point Drive which goes north towards Forster and south towards Pacific Palms.

=== Public Transportation ===
Green Point is serviced by the Forster operator of the Buslines Group. Forster Buslines offers a route open to the general public and school buses.
