= Back Creek =

Back Creek may refer to:

== Australia ==
- Back Creek (Richmond Valley, New South Wales), a tributary of the Richmond River, in the Richmond Valley local government area of New South Wales
- Back Creek (Cooma-Monaro, New South Wales), a tributary of the Bombala River in the Cooma-Monaro Shire local government area of New South Wales
- Back Creek (Upper Hunter, New South Wales), a tributary of the Rouchel Brook, in the Upper Hunter Shire local government area of New South Wales
- Back Creek, New South Wales (Bland), a locality in Bland Shire local government area of New South Wales
- Back Creek, New South Wales (Gwydir), a locality in Gwydir Shire local government area of New South Wales
- Back Creek, New South Wales (Mid-Coast Council), a locality in Mid-Coast Council local government area of New South Wales
- Back Creek, New South Wales (Queanbeyan–Palerang), a locality in Queanbeyan–Palerang Shire local government area of New South Wales
- Back Creek, New South Wales (Tenterfield), a locality in Tenterfield Shire local government area of New South Wales
- Back Creek, New South Wales (Tweed), a locality in Tweed Shire local government area of New South Wales

== United States ==
- Back Creek (Missouri), a tributary of Wolf Creek
- Back Creek (Conococheague Creek), a tributary of Conococheague Creek in Pennsylvania
- Back Creek (New Jersey), an estuary of Delaware Bay
- Back Creek (Haw River tributary), a stream in Alamance County, North Carolina
- Back Creek (Rocky River tributary), a stream in Cabarrus and Mecklenburg Counties, North Carolina
- Back Creek (Caraway Creek tributary), a stream in Randolph County, North Carolina
- Back Creek (Potomac River tributary), a tributary of the Potomac River in Virginia and West Virginia
- Back Creek (Jackson River), a tributary of the Jackson River in Virginia
- Back Creek, part of the Chesapeake & Delaware Canal
