= John Thomson (Australian politician) =

Australian politician (1862–1934)

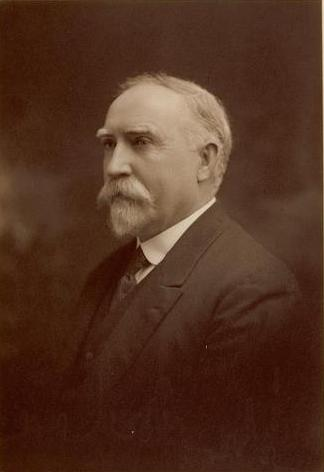

Member of the Australian Parliament for Cowper
- In office 12 December 1906 – 13 December 1919
- Preceded by: Henry Lee
- Succeeded by: Earle Page

Personal details
- Born: 1862 Taree, New South Wales
- Died: 14 July 1934 (aged 71–72)
- Party: Protectionist (1906–09); Liberal (1909–17); Nationalist (1917–19)
- Occupation: Shopkeeper, grazier

John Thomson (1862 – 14 July 1934) was an Australian politician. He was a Progressive Party member of the New South Wales Legislative Assembly from 1901 to 1904, representing the Manning electorate. He was then a member of the Australian House of Representatives from 1906 to 1919, representing Cowper for the Protectionist Party and its successors the Commonwealth Liberal Party and Nationalist Party.

== Early life ==
Thomson was born at Woolla (now Kolodong), near Taree, where his father was the local teacher. He was educated at Taree before entering his family's Taree general store business, taking over as manager following the death of his father in 1884. He was an alderman of the Municipality of Taree and its mayor from 1896 to 1901, president of the Manning River Agricultural & Horticultural Society and president of the Manning River District Hospital board.

== New South Wales parliament ==
He was elected to the New South Wales Legislative Assembly at the 1901 state election in the Manning electorate as a member of the Progressive Party (1901), defeating the sitting member James Young. The 1903 New South Wales referendum required the number of members of the Legislative Assembly to be reduced from 125 to 90, and the Manning was one of the abolished seats. Part of the Manning was absorbed into Gloucester, and both Thomson and Young contested the seat at the 1904 state election, with Young defeating Thomson. He stood again as an independent Nationalist candidate for the state seat of Oxley at the 1927 election, but was comfortably defeated.

== Australian parliament ==
In 1906, Thomson was elected to the Australian House of Representatives as a Protectionist, defeating Henry Lee of the Anti-Socialist Party for the seat of Cowper. In 1909 he became a member of the Commonwealth Liberal Party, the result of a fusion between the Protectionists and the Anti-Socialists. In 1911, he was part of the parliamentary party that visited England as guests for the Coronation of George V and Mary. He was a member of the Royal Commission on the Fruit Industry from 1912 to 1914, temporary chairman of committees from 1913 to 1917, a member of the Joint Committee on Public Accounts from 1914 to 1919 and its chairman from 1917. In 1917, the Commonwealth Liberal Party merged into the new Nationalist Party, and Thomson was Ministerial Whip from 1917 to 1919. He was defeated in 1920 by future Prime Minister of Australia Earle Page, who contested for the Farmers and Settlers Association.

== Later life ==
Following his parliamentary defeat, Thomson briefly resided in Melbourne before returning to his family business, serving as chairman of directors of what was now incorporated as Thomsons Ltd., a role he held until his death. He also purchased a grazing and dairying property at Mount George, and increasingly retired there apart from his board duties in his later years. He died at Mount George in 1934 and was buried at the Dawson River Cemetery at Cundletown.

New South Wales Legislative Assembly
Preceded by James Young	Member for Manning; 1901–1904	District abolished
Parliament of Australia
Preceded by Henry Lee	Member for Cowper; 1906–1919	Succeeded by Earle Page
