= Wallabi Point, New South Wales =

Wallabi Point
- Town
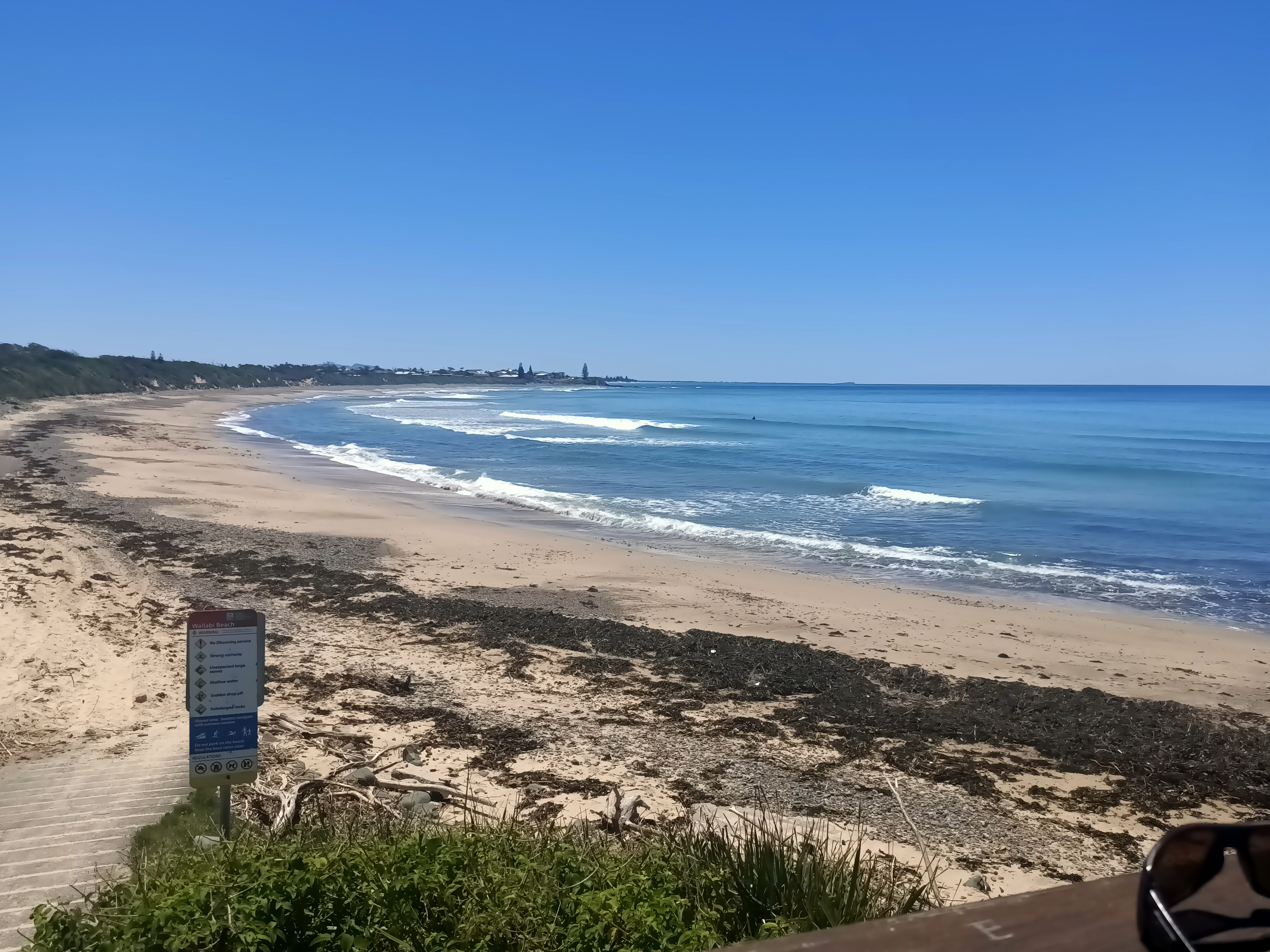
- Wallabi Beach at Wallabi Point on a cloud-free, bright Spring day.

- Coordinates: 31°59′40″S 152°34′6″E
- Country: Australia
- State: New South Wales
- LGA: Mid-Coast Council
- Location: 326 km (203 mi) NNE of Sydney; 178 km (111 mi) NE of Newcastle; 20 km (12 mi) SE of Taree; 45 km (28 mi) N of Forster

Government
  - State electorate: Myall Lakes
  - Federal division: Lyne
- Elevation: 14 m (46 ft)

Population
  - Total: 675 (2016 census)
- Postcode: 2430
- County: Gloucester
- Parish: Bohnock
Localities around Wallabi Point
Koorainghat	Old Bar	Old Bar
Saltwater	Wallabi Point	Tasman Sea
Diamond Beach	Tasman Sea	Tasman Sea

Wallabi Point is a coastal town in New South Wales, Australia in Mid-Coast Council.
