= Smiths Lake (New South Wales) =

- Smith Lake
- Location within New South Wales Location within Australia
- Location: Mid North Coast, New South Wales, Australia
- Coordinates: 32°23′S 152°30′E
- Type: Intermittently closed youthful saline coastal lagoon
- Primary inflows: Wamwarra Creek, Tarbuck Creek
- Primary outflows: Intermittently open sandbar to the Tasman Sea
- Catchment area: 28 square kilometres (11 sq mi)
- Basin countries: Australia
- Managing agency: Mid-Coast Council
- Surface area: 10 square kilometres (3.9 sq mi)
- Average depth: 2.4 metres (7 ft 10 in)
- Water volume: 23,552.5 megalitres (831.75×10^{6} cu ft)
- Surface elevation: 0 m (0 ft)
- Islands: Big Island, Little Island, Bull Island
- Settlements: Green Point, Pacific Palms, Smiths Lake
- Website: NSW Environment & Heritage webpage

Smiths Lake, an intermittently closed youthful saline coastal lagoon, is located within the Mid-Coast Council local government area in the Mid North Coast region of New South Wales, Australia. Smiths Lake is located adjacent to the village of Smiths Lake, and adjacent to the east coast, about 274 kilometres (170 mi) north of Sydney.

== Features and location ==
Drawing its catchment from within Wallingat National Park, Wallingat State Forest and the Wamwarra and Tarbuck creeks, Smiths Lake has a relatively small catchment area of 28 square kilometres (11 sq mi) and a surface area of 10 square kilometres (3.9 sq mi).

Part of the lake shore is a sandbar that separates the lake from the Tasman Sea. When the Mid-Coast Council deems that the lake water level is too high and may cause flooding to low-lying areas around the lake, a trench is constructed from the lake to the ocean using a bulldozer. This releases water from the lake into the ocean and considerably lowers the lake water level.

Due to the nature of Smiths Lake being a coastal dune lake, or coastal lagoon, it was featured in an American documentary about conservation done by producer Elam Stoltzfus.

The most northern of the Ramsar-protected Myall Lakes are located close to the south of Smiths Lake. However, Smiths Lake does not connect nor is formally part of the Myall Lakes. The southern part of Smiths Lake also forms the northern boundary of the Myall Lakes National Park.

Within Smiths Lake there are three islands; Big Island, Little Island, and Bull Island.

Smiths Lake supported a small but viable commercial fishing industry up until April 2007, when the lake was incorporated into the Port Stephens-Great Lakes Marine Park. Because of this, the western third of Smiths Lake is classed as a Sanctuary Zone and the northeastern area, known as Symes Bay, is classed as Habitat Protection Zone, which means commercial fishing in more than two thirds of the lake is no longer permitted.

== See also ==
- List of lakes of Australia
