= Dawson River (New South Wales) =

River in New South Wales, Australia

Coordinates: 31°53′S 152°30′E

Dawson River Dawsons River, Brimbin Creek

Location
- Country: Australia
- State: New South Wales
- IBRA: NSW North Coast
- District: Mid North Coast
- Local government area: Mid-Coast Council

Physical characteristics
- Source: Mount Goonook, Gibraltar Range
  - location: near Killabakh
  - elevation: 176 m (577 ft)
- Mouth: confluence with the Manning River
  - location: Cundletown
  - elevation: 0 m (0 ft)
- Length: 32 km (20 mi)

Basin features
- River system: Manning River catchment
- Tributaries
  - right: Williams Creek (Dawson, New South Wales)
- Nature reserve: Goonook

Dawson River, a perennial river of the Manning River catchment, is located in the Mid North Coast district of New South Wales, Australia.

== Course and features ==
Dawson River rises below Mount Goonook within the Gibraltar Range, near Killabakh, and flows generally south by east, before reaching its confluence with the northern passage of the Manning River, at Cundletown. The river descends 177 metres (581 ft) over its 32 kilometres (20 mi) course.

== See also ==
- Rivers of New South Wales
- List of rivers of New South Wales (A–K)
- List of rivers of Australia
