= Black Head, New South Wales =

Black Head Girriwa (Worimi)
- Town
- Black Head rock pool with Black Head Beach in the background.

- Coordinates: 32°4′18″S 152°32′47″E
- Country: Australia
- State: New South Wales
- LGA: MidCoast Council

Government
  - State electorate: Myall Lakes
  - Federal division: Lyne
- Postcode: 2430
Localities around Black Head
Rainbow Flat	Diamond Beach	Tasman Sea
Tallwoods Village	Black Head	Tasman Sea
Hallidays Point	Tasman Sea	Tasman Sea

Black Head, also known as Gearywah (Worimi: Girriwa), is a locality in the Mid North Coast region of New South Wales, Australia. It is between the towns of Taree and Forster, and is 79 kilometres (49 mi) south of Port Macquarie.

Black Head Beach has won awards, and it is patrolled during the summer. The Black Head Surf Lifesaving Club overlooks the beach.

There are cafés, a FoodWorks supermarket and a rock pool. Away from the beach there are coastal landforms, including the headland of Black Head, and rare tracts of littoral rainforest. On the first Sunday of each month from September to May, the town holds the Black Head Bazaar, a market that attracts numerous stallholders.

== See also ==
- Littoral Rainforests of New South Wales
