= Diamond Beach =

Diamond Beach may mean

- Diamond Beach, Iceland, a black-sand beach with iceberg fragments
- Diamond Beach, New Jersey, USA
- Diamond Beach, New South Wales, Australia
