= Diamond Beach, New South Wales =

Diamond Beach
- Town
- Diamond Beach viewed from the Diamond Beach Lookout

- Coordinates: 32°02′38.61″S 152°32′22.43″E
- Country: Australia
- State: New South Wales
- Region: Mid North Coast
- LGA: Mid-Coast Council
- Location: 303 km (188 mi) NNE of Sydney; 163 km (101 mi) NNE of Newcastle; 30 km (19 mi) SSE of Taree; 24 km (15 mi) N of Forster; 65 km (40 mi) NE of Bulahdelah

Government
  - State electorate: Myall Lakes
  - Federal division: Lyne
- Elevation: 6 m (20 ft)

Population
  - Total: 886 (2016 census)
- Time zone: UTC+10 (AEST)
  - Summer (DST): UTC+11 (AEDT)
- Postcode: 2430
- County: Gloucester
Localities around Diamond Beach
Koorainghat	Saltwater	Wallabi Point
Rainbow Flat	Diamond Beach	Tasman Sea
Tallwoods Village	Black Head	Tasman Sea

Diamond Beach is a coastal town in the Mid North Coast region of New South Wales, Australia, in the Mid-Coast Council LGA, about 303 km (188 mi) north-north-east of Sydney.

At the 2011 census, Diamond Beach had a population of 849 people.
