= Glen Martin, New South Wales =

Glen Martin New South Wales
- Coordinates: 32°32′17.7″S 151°49′16.2″E
- Population: 172 (2016 census)
  - Density: 2.493/km^{2} (6.46/sq mi)
- Postcode(s): 2321
- Area: 69 km^{2} (26.6 sq mi)
- Time zone: AEST (UTC+10)
  - Summer (DST): AEDT (UTC+11)
- Location: 216 km (134 mi) NNE of Sydney; 67 km (42 mi) N of Newcastle; 22 km (14 mi) SW of Dungog; 11 km (7 mi) NNE of Clarence Town
- LGA(s): Dungog
- Region: Hunter
- County: Gloucester
- Parish: Horton
- State electorate(s): Upper Hunter
- Federal division(s): Lyne
Suburbs around Glen Martin:
Flat Tops	Cambra	Booral
Glen William	Glen Martin	Limeburners Creek
Clarence Town	Clarence Town	Limeburners Creek

Glen Martin is a scattered rural community located within the Hunter Region of New South Wales, Australia. It is part of the Dungog local government area.

Not a lot is known about the early history of Glen Martin, but the name most likely comes from an early estate at the time of settlement. Records show that there was once a public school, community hall and Post Office in the area; none of these buildings stand today. In 2016 the population was 172 with a median age of 47. 86.6% of the population were born in Australia.
