= Dawson River =

Dawson River may refer to:

- Dawson River (New South Wales)
- Dawson River (Queensland)
- Dawson River (Tasmania)
