= Gundayne House =

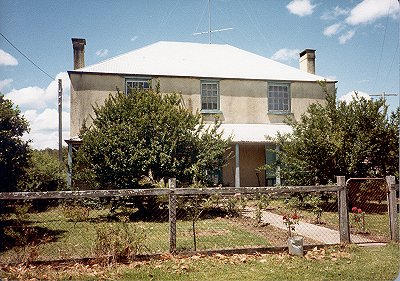

- Location within New South Wales Location within Australia
- 32.4743°S 151.9610°E
- Location: The Bucketts Way, Booral, Mid-Coast Council, New South Wales, Australia

New South Wales Heritage Register
- Official name: Gundayne House Group
- Type: state heritage (built)
- Designated: 2 April 1999
- Reference no.: 309
- Type: House
- Category: Residential buildings (private)
- Builders: Sam Carnell, mason

Gundayne House is a heritage-listed residence at 9 Lowes Lane, Booral, New South Wales, Australia. Locared just off the Bucketts Way in the state's Mid North Coast region, it was built by stonemason Sam Carnell. It was added to the New South Wales State Heritage Register on 2 April 1999.

== History ==
The district owes its early origins to the Australian Agricultural Company (AACo) which was set up in London in December 1824. It received a grant of one million acres (400,000 ha) in New South Wales and subsequently set up its first colony at Carrington on the northern shores of Port Stephens in January 1826. The AACo was responsible for the development of the region and the town of Stroud was established in 1827. The township of Booral developed as an agricultural service town within the company's most important crop growing areas.

The land was purchased in 1851 by John Lowry Esq. from the AACo. The first known owner was John Skillman.

The probable date of construction of Gundayne House is c. 1860. The stonemason was Sam Carnell, who was also stonemason of St Johns Church of England in Raymond Terrace.

In 1981 Great Lakes Shire Council received an application for subdivision of land for the purpose of purchasing and restoring Gundayne House. To safeguard the satisfactory restoration of the house, Great Lakes Shire Council nominated Gundayne House for protection under the Heritage Act in 1981.

An Interim Conservation Order was placed on the residence together with the outhouse and schoolhouse adjacent to it and its site on 23 April 1982.

In 1982 the original property was subdivided to excise the house and grounds subject of the Interim Heritage Order from the remainder of the property under an application approved under the Heritage Act 1977.

A Permanent Conservation Order was placed over Gundayne House on 25 May 1984.

== Description ==
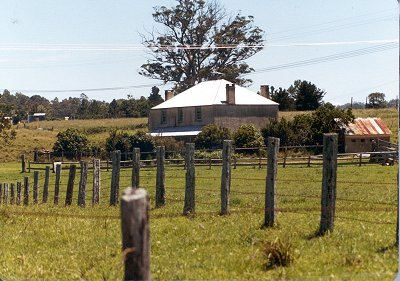
Gundayne House Group

Gundayne is part of a larger group of significant buildings including Booral House, the former wharf remains, St. Barnabas Church and cemetery and the Booral School group.

Garden

Remnants of the original garden layout and mature plantings, including two large specimens of magniflora still remain.

House

Gundayne is a two-storey residence of symmetrical design, built in approximately 1860 on land purchased from the Australian Agricultural Company. It is prominently located on the southern approach to the township to Booral. The land visually associated with the residence is bounded by the main road to the west, a lane to the south and a creek to the east and north and is approximately four hectares in area.

Constructed of brick, the walls of the house are covered with stucco and lime. The windows throughout are of 12 or 16 panes. The hipped roof of the house is of corrugated iron as is the roof of the front verandah. Of particular interest are the tapered timber columns of the front verandah which are typical of the Stroud district.

Further Stroud features can be seen in the squared patera and tapering pilasters of the ground floor fireplaces. All the joinery in the house is of cedar.

Outbuildings

Located at the rear of Gundayne House is a small rubble building which possibly predates the main house. Approximately 200 metres from the house is a small timber school house which dates from the 1890s.

A former church structure was on the property, but deteriorated and fell down.

== Heritage listing ==
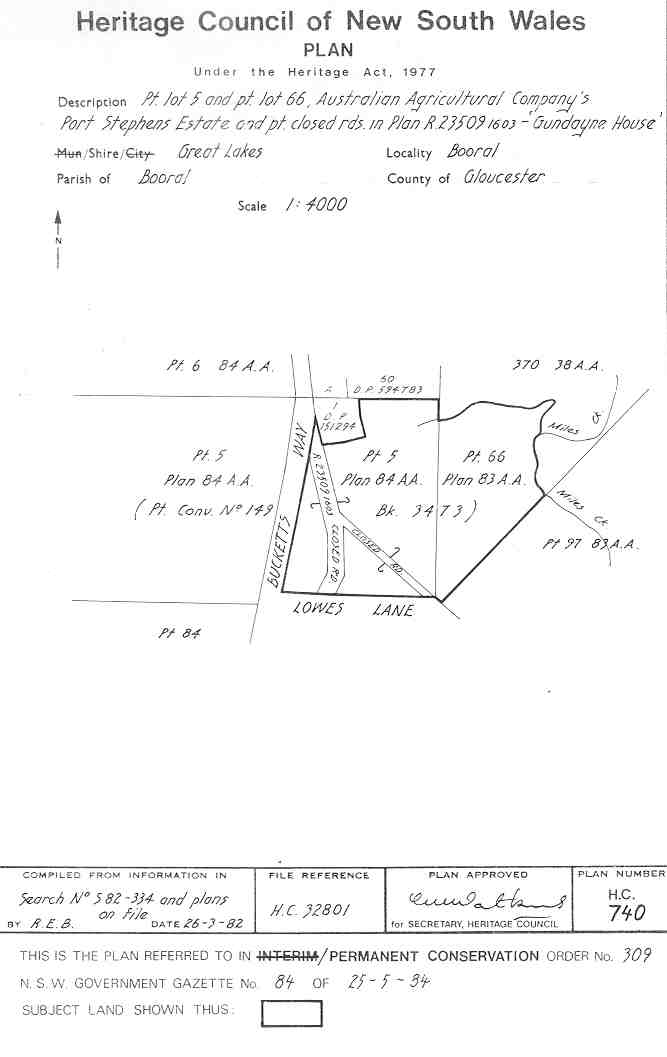
Heritage boundaries

Gundayne House is significant as an example of a mid-nineteenth century house, with its rural setting, its detailing in the local idiom and its association with other nearby heritage items such as The Gables and Booral Wharf. It is noteworthy for its simple Georgian detailing, relatively intact interior, a scenic rural setting with significant outbuildings (remains of weatherboard schoolroom, underground well and weatherboard church). It is one of the few buildings which serve as a reminders of the establishment of Booral as an Australian Agricultural Company town. Gundayne House is prominently located on the southern approach to the township of Booral.

Gundayne House was listed on the New South Wales State Heritage Register on 2 April 1999 having satisfied the following criteria.

The place is important in demonstrating the course, or pattern, of cultural or natural history in New South Wales.

Gundayne House is significant as an example of a mid-nineteenth century house, with its rural setting, its detailing in the local idiom and its association with other nearby heritage items such as The Gables and Booral Wharf. It is one of the few buildings which serve as a reminders of the establishment of Booral as an agricultural company town.

The place is important in demonstrating aesthetic characteristics and/or a high degree of creative or technical achievement in New South Wales.

It is noteworthy for its simple Georgian detailing, relatively intact interior, a scenic rural setting with significant outbuildings (remains of weatherboard schoolroom, underground well and weatherboard church). Gundayne House is prominently located on the southern approach to the township of Booral.
