= Manning River railway bridge, Taree =

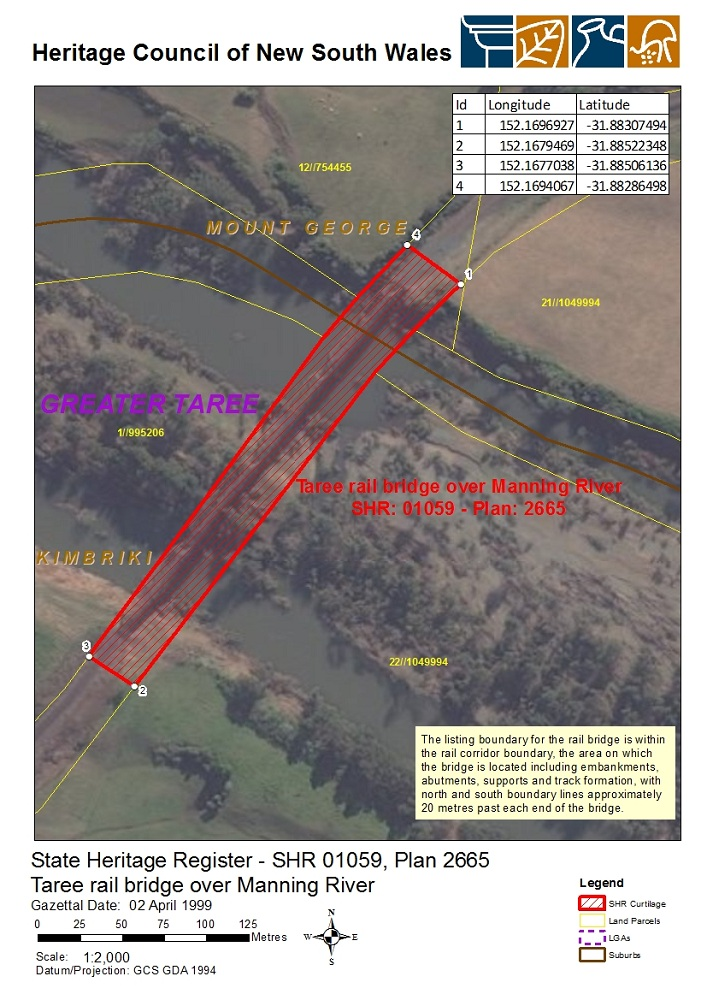
- Heritage boundaries
- Coordinates: 31°53′01″S 152°10′09″E
- Carries: North Coast Line
- Crosses: Manning River
- Locale: Near Mount George, Taree, Mid-Coast Council, New South Wales, Australia
- Other names: Taree rail bridge over Manning River; Mount George Rail Bridge over Manning River
- Owner: Transport Asset Manager of New South Wales

Characteristics
- Design: Truss bridge
- Material: Steel
- Longest span: 61 metres (200 ft)
- No. of spans: 4

Rail characteristics
- Track gauge: 4 ft 8 1/2 in (1,435 mm) standard gauge

History
- Constructed by: A. S. Norquay for Smith, Timms & Co.
- Fabrication by: R. Tulloch and Co. Ltd of Phoenix Ironworks
- Construction end: 1911

New South Wales Heritage Register
- Official name: Taree rail bridge over Manning River; Mount George Rail Bridge over Manning River
- Type: State heritage (built)
- Designated: 2 April 1999
- Reference no.: 1059
- Type: Railway Bridge / Viaduct
- Category: Transport – Rail

Location
- Interactive map of Manning River railway bridge, Taree

The Manning River railway bridge is a heritage-listed railway bridge that carries the North Coast Line across the Manning River located at Mount George, near Taree in the Mid-Coast Council local government area of New South Wales, Australia. The bridge is also known as the Mount George Rail Bridge over Manning River. The property is owned by Transport Asset Manager of New South Wales, an agency of the Government of New South Wales. It was added to the New South Wales State Heritage Register on 2 April 1999.

== History ==
The bridge was built in 1911. It was manufactured by R. Tulloch and Co. Ltd of Phoenix Ironworks in Pyrmont, Sydney, and was erected by A. S. Norquay for Smith, Timms & Co., contractors for the Gloucester to Taree section of the North Coast railway line.

It underwent repairs in 2005–2006.

== Description ==
It is a steel truss bridge comprising four 61-metre (200 ft) spans.

== Heritage listing ==
The underbridge over the Manning River is a typical structure on the North Coast railway line and a major structure in the local area.

The Taree rail bridge over Manning River was listed on the New South Wales State Heritage Register on 2 April 1999 having satisfied the following criteria.

The place possesses uncommon, rare or endangered aspects of the cultural or natural history of New South Wales.

This item is assessed as historically rare. This item is assessed as arch. rare. This item is assessed as socially rare.

== See also ==
- List of railway bridges in New South Wales
