= Number One, New South Wales =

Number One New South Wales
- Coordinates: 31°44′S 152°04′E
- Population: 27 (2021 census)
- Postcode(s): 2424
- Location: 360 km (224 mi) from Sydney; 220 km (137 mi) from Newcastle; 58 km (36 mi) from Taree
- LGA(s): Mid-Coast Council
- State electorate(s): Myall Lakes
- Federal division(s): Lyne

Number One is a small rural locality in the Mid North Coast region, located within the Mid-Coast Council local government area of New South Wales, Australia. It is situated approximately 360 kilometres (220 mi) north of Sydney.

At the 2021 census, the town reported a resident population of 27. The median age is 53.

The Nowendoc River, a perennial river of the Manning River catchment runs through the location.
