= Stephen Bromhead =

Australian politician (1957–2023)

Member of the New South Wales Parliament for Myall Lakes
- In office 26 March 2011 – 3 March 2023
- Preceded by: John Turner
- Succeeded by: Tanya Thompson

NSW Parliamentary Secretary for Regional Transport and Roads
- In office 12 April 2022 – 16 March 2023
- Minister: Sam Farraway
- In office 24 April 2019 – 22 June 2021
- Minister: Paul Toole

NSW Parliamentary Secretary for Regional Housing
- In office 22 June 2021 – 21 December 2021
- Minister: Melinda Pavey (Minister for Water, Property and Housing

Personal details
- Born: Stephen Bruce Bromhead; 30 October 1957
- Died: 16 March 2023 (aged 65)
- Party: The Nationals (since 1985)
- Spouse: Sue Bromhead
- Children: 7
- Education: University of New South Wales
- Occupation: Nurse; Solicitor; Police officer Politician

Stephen Bruce Bromhead (30 October 1957 – 16 March 2023) was an Australian politician who was a member of the New South Wales Legislative Assembly, representing Myall Lakes for the Nationals from 26 March 2011 until his retirement on 3 March 2023. He died less than two weeks later on 16 March 2023.

== Early years and background ==
Bromhead was a registered nurse with two certificates, commencing work initially as a nurse. He later joined the New South Wales Police Force, serving initially as a general duties officer and then as a detective; serving for a total of 12 years in the majority around Taree and surrounding districts. Whilst working as a police officer, Bromhead studied law by correspondence and was admitted as a solicitor. He had subsequently studied and completed his Master of Law through the University of New South Wales specialising in corporate, commercial and taxation law.

Bromhead had served as a Councillor on the Greater Taree City Council and had extensive community involvement including local rugby union football clubs, tourism associations, chambers of commerce, and horse racing clubs.

== Political career ==
Following an earlier announcement that the Nationals' sitting member, John Turner would not be seeking re-election, Bromhead was endorsed by the National Party as the candidate in June 2010. During the last two weeks of the election campaign, Bromhead was involved in a motor vehicle accident where it was reported that he fractured his leg. The leg was fractured again in September 2011 when Bromhead jumped up to ask a question during question time in parliament.

At the March 2011 elections, Bromhead was elected and received a swing toward him of 11.2% after preferences in the traditionally strong Nationals seat, winning 78.6% of the vote on a two-party preferred basis.

At the March 2015 elections, Bromhead was re-elected.

In October 2022, Bromhead announced he would retire and not contest the 2023 New South Wales state election as he had been diagnosed with mesothelioma. He died on 16 March 2023.

New South Wales Legislative Assembly
Preceded by John Turner	Member for Myall Lakes; 2011–2023	Succeeded by Tanya Thompson
