= Allocasuarina simulans =

Conservation status
- Vulnerable (EPBC Act)

Scientific classification
- Kingdom: Plantae
- Clade: Tracheophytes
- Clade: Angiosperms
- Clade: Eudicots
- Clade: Rosids
- Order: Fagales
- Family: Casuarinaceae
- Genus: Allocasuarina
- Species: A. simulans

Binomial name
- Allocasuarina simulans L.A.S.Johnson
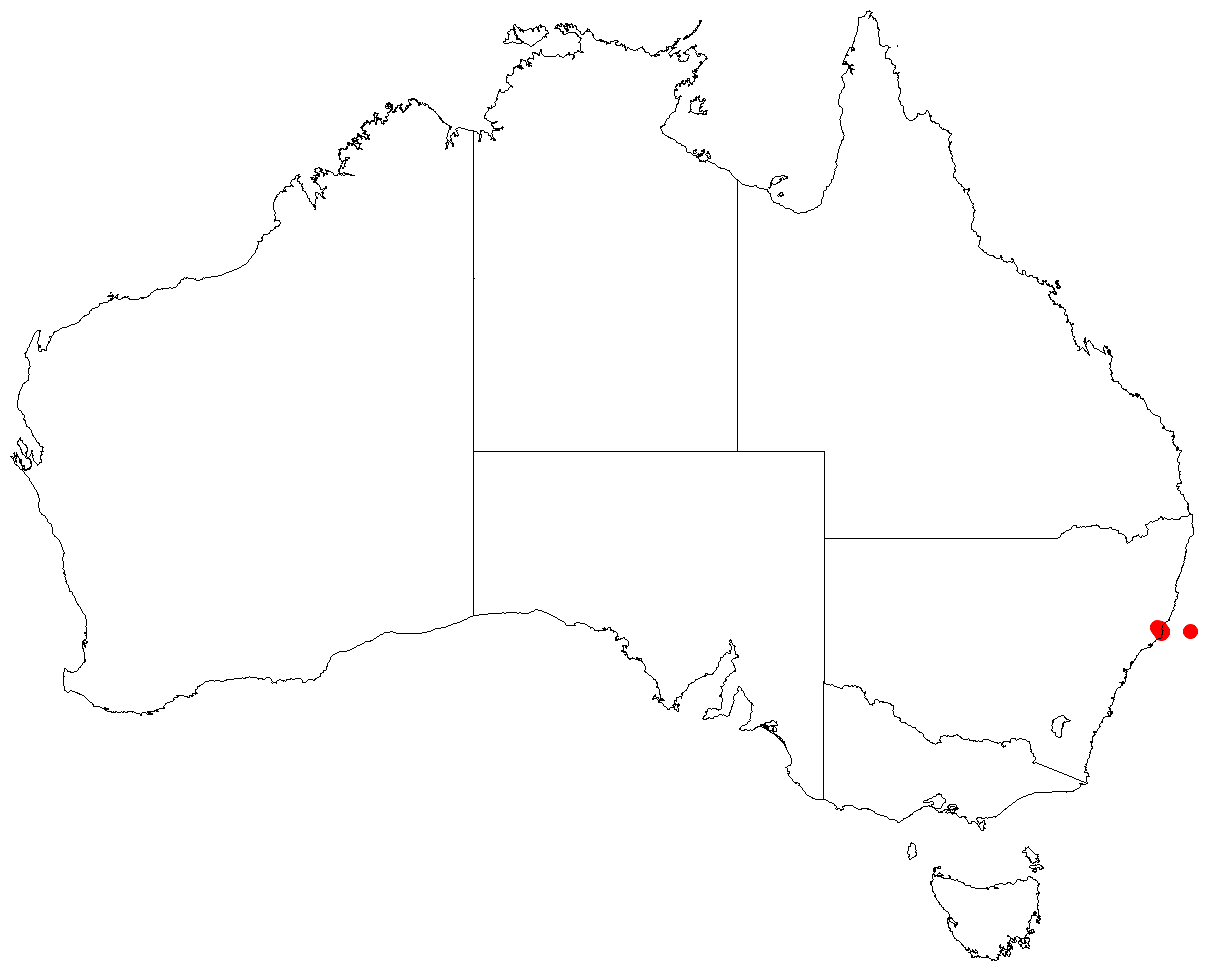
- Occurrence data from AVH

Species of tree

Allocasuarina simulans, commonly known as Nabiac casuarina, is a species of flowering plant in the family Casuarinaceae and is endemic to a restricted part of eastern New South Wales. It is a usually a dioecious shrub with branchlets up to 190 mm (7 in) long, the leaves reduced to scales in whorls of six, the fruiting cones 14–33 mm (0.6–1 in) long containing winged seeds (samaras) 4.5–6.0 mm (0.18–0.24 in) long.

== Description ==
Allocasuarina simulans is a dioecious, rarely a monoecious shrub that typically grows to a height of 1–3 m (3 ft 3 in – 9 ft 10 in) and mainly has smooth bark. Its branchlets are up to 190 mm (7.5 in) long, the leaves reduced to erect, often overlapping, scale-like teeth 0.5–1.1 mm (0.02–0.04 in) long, arranged in whorls of six around the branchlets. The sections of branchlet between the leaf whorls are 13–22 mm (0.5–0.9 in) long and 0.9–1.3 mm (0.04–0.05 in) wide. Male flowers are arranged in spikes 15–45 mm (0.6–2 in) long, with about four whorls per cm (per 0.4 in), the anthers about 1.3 mm (0.05 in) long. Female cones are borne on a peduncle 3–14 mm (0.1–0.6 in) long, the mature cones 14–33 mm (0.6–1 in) long and 9–12 mm (0.4–0.5 in) in diameter, the winged seeds 4.5–6.0 mm (0.18–0.24 in) long.

Nabiac casuarina resembles Allocasuarina distyla, but is usually more slender.

== Taxonomy ==
Allocasuarina simulans was first formally described in 1989 by Lawrie Johnson in Flora of Australia from specimens collected at an old airstrip near Nabiac in 1975. The specific epithet simulans means 'imitating' or 'resembling'.

== Distribution and habitat ==
This she-oak is only known from near Myall Lakes, where it grows in sandy heath, shrubland and open woodland between Booti Booti National Park and Nabiac in eastern New South Wales.

== Conservation status ==
Nabiac casuarina is listed as "vulnerable" under the Australian Government Environment Protection and Biodiversity Conservation Act 1999 and the New South Wales Government Biodiversity Conservation Act 2016. The main threats to the species include disturbance from sand mining, inappropriate fire regimes and weed invasion, especially by exotic species such as Lantana camara.
