= Cedar Party, New South Wales =

Cedar Party New South Wales
- Coordinates: 31°48′S 152°22′E
- Population: 379 (2021 census)
- Postcode(s): 2429
- Location: 328 km (204 mi) from Sydney; 188 km (117 mi) from Newcastle; 15 km (9 mi) from Taree
- LGA(s): Mid-Coast Council
- State electorate(s): Myall Lakes
- Federal division(s): Lyne

Cedar Party is a small town in the Mid North Coast region, located within the Mid-Coast Council local government area of New South Wales, Australia. It is situated approximately 328 kilometres (204 mi) north of Sydney.

At the 2016 census, the town reported a resident population of 364. The median age is 55 and Aboriginal and Torres Strait Islander people account for 5.5% of the population.

The Cedar Party Creek, a perennial stream of the Manning River catchment runs through the town.
