= Purfleet, New South Wales =

Purfleet
- Suburb
- Interactive map of Purfleet
- Coordinates: 31°56′S 152°28′E
- Country: Australia
- State: New South Wales
- City: Taree
- LGA: Mid-Coast Council
- Location: 313 km (194 mi) from Sydney; 167 km (104 mi) from Newcastle; 7 km (4.3 mi) from Taree

Government
  - State electorate: Myall Lakes
  - Federal division: Lyne

Population
  - Total: 127 (2016 census)
- Postcode: 2430

Purfleet is a small suburb of the Greater Taree region, located within the Mid-Coast Council local government area of New South Wales, Australia. It is situated approximately 313 kilometres (194 mi) north of Sydney.

== Demographics ==
At the 2016 census, the town reported a resident population of 127. The median age was 30.

== Indigenous presence ==
Prior to 1818, there were solely Aboriginal people tribes living in the greater area before European settlers arrival. By 1900, some 18 acres of land at Purfleet were allocated towards an Aboriginal reserve, originally known as Sunshine Station, established by the Aborigines Protection Board, with the purpose of racial segregation. Originally known as Sunshine Station, Aboriginals who are re-located from the greater area to the reserve, were forbidden to leave to go to nearby towns unless they attained permission of the manager. A mission school operated on the reserve from 1903 until 1952.

The Purfleet/Taree Local Aboriginal Land Council is located within the suburb, as is the Biripi Aboriginal Corporation Medical Centre.

Aunty Pat Davis-Hurst AO AM, an Aboriginal elder, healthcare worker and activist, was born on the mission.
