= Smiths Lake, New South Wales =

Smiths Lake
- Town
- Coordinates: 32°23′13″S 152°30′6″E
- Country: Australia
- State: New South Wales
- Region: Mid North Coast
- LGA: Mid-Coast Council
- Location: 274 km (170 mi) NNE of Sydney; 142 km (88 mi) NNE of Newcastle

Government
  - State electorate: Myall Lakes
  - Federal division: Lyne

Population
  - Total: 1,332 (2021 census)
- Time zone: UTC+10 (AEST)
  - Summer (DST): UTC+11 (AEDT)
- Postcode: 2428
Localities around Smiths Lake
Tarbuck Bay	Charlottes Bay	Pacific Palms
Bungwahl	Smiths Lake	Tasman Sea
Myall Lakes	Yagon	Seal Rocks

Smiths Lake is a small village in the Mid North Coast region of Pacific Palms, located within the Mid-Coast Council local government area of New South Wales, Australia. Smiths Lake is approximately 274 kilometres (170 mi) north of Sydney. Smiths Lake gives its name to the village, situated nearby. At the 2016 census, Smiths Lake had a population of 1,235 people.

== Tourism ==
Smiths Lake is a popular tourist destination, mostly due to its position next to several waterways. Popular tourist activities include boating and fishing on the local lakes (Smiths Lake, Myall Lakes and Wallis Lake) or swimming and sunbathing at the local beaches (Cellito beach, Blueys beach, Boomerang beach, Elizabeth beach, and Seal Rocks beach – also the unofficially naturist Shelley Beach). Other activities include nature walks in the surrounding national parks or visiting a regional attraction, such as Seal Rocks lighthouse or The Grandis, the tallest tree known in New South Wales at 84.3 metres (277 ft) tall.

== Commercial fishing ==
Smiths Lake supported a small but viable commercial fishing industry up until April 2007, when the lake was incorporated into the Port Stephens-Great Lakes Marine Park. Because of this, the western third of Smiths Lake is classed as a Sanctuary Zone and the northeastern area, known as Symes Bay, is classed as Habitat Protection Zone, which means commercial fishing in more than two thirds of the lake is no longer permitted.
