= Allworth, New South Wales =

Allworth
- Town
- Coordinates: 32°33′S 151°57′E
- Country: Australia
- State: New South Wales
- LGA: Mid-Coast Council
- Location: 210 km (130 mi) NNE of Sydney; 61 km (38 mi) N of Newcastle; 144 km (89 mi) from Taree; 44 km (27 mi) ESE of Dungog; 41 km (25 mi) WSW of Bulahdelah

Government
  - State electorate: Upper Hunter
  - Federal division: Lyne
- Elevation: 26 m (85 ft)

Population
  - Total: 190 (SAL 2021)
- Postcode: 2425
Localities around Allworth
Cambra	Booral	Girvan
Glen Martin	Allworth	The Branch
Twelve Mile Creek	Karuah	North Arm Cove

Allworth is a small village in New South Wales, Australia. It is located 210 km (130 mi) north of Sydney, and 61 km (38 mi) north of Newcastle.

At the 2021 census, Allworth had a population of 190.

== History ==
The Allworth Post Office, which was originally named New Wharf Post Office, opened on 15 July 1911 and closed on 14 March 1973. It Has since come into the housing market, having an estimated value of $700,000, it is also home to a family of 4
