= 2024 MidCoast Council election =

- 14 September 2024

All 11 seats on MidCoast Council 6 seats needed for a majority
- Registered: 78,357
- Turnout: 84.3%
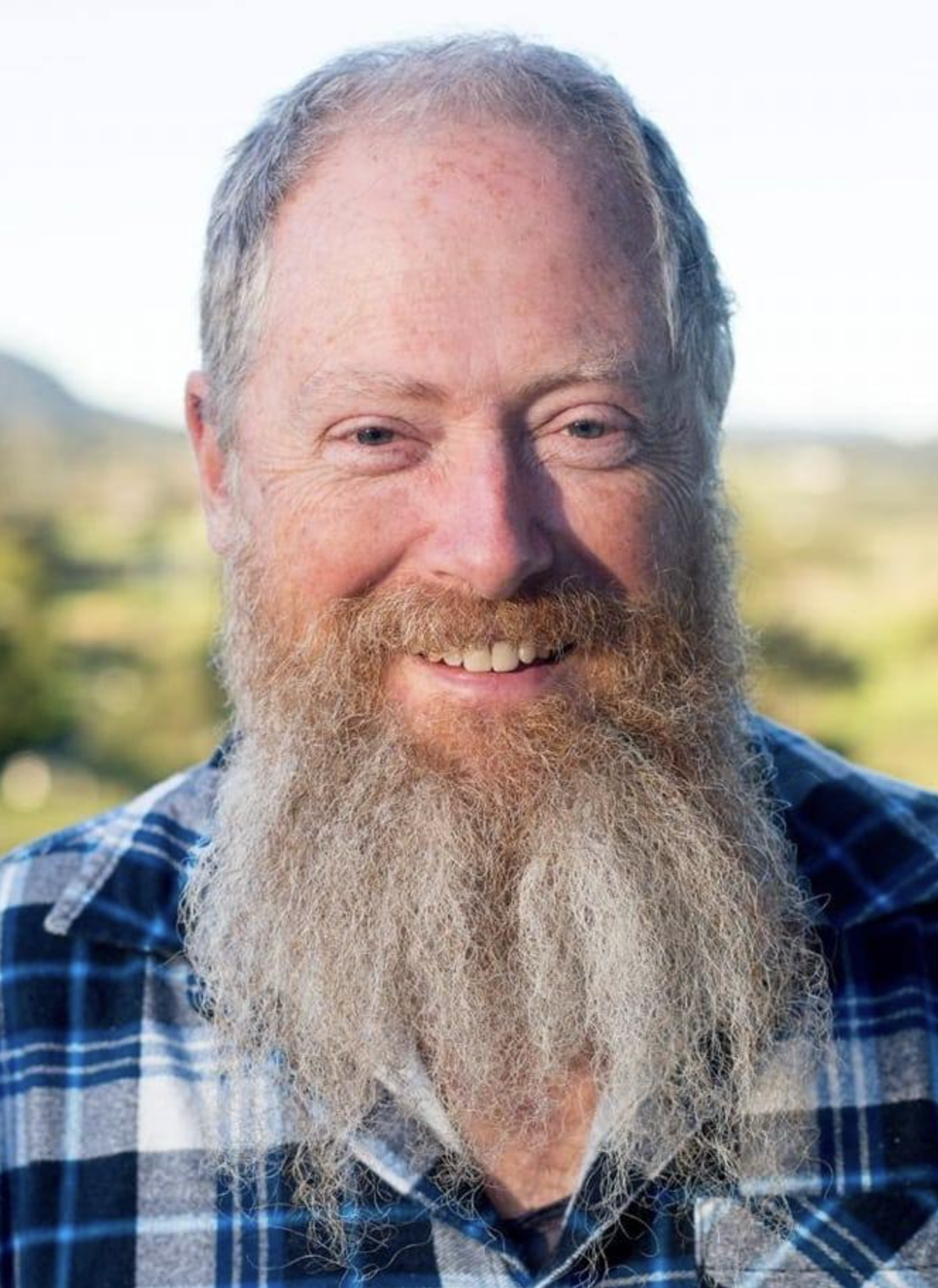

	First party	Second party	Third party
			TICK
Leader	Michael Graham	Claire Pontin	Alan Tickle
Party	Libertarian	Labor	Tickle Group
Last election	Did not contest	1 seat	1 seat
Seats before	0	1	1
Seats won	3	2	2
Seat change	▲3	▲1	▲1
Primary vote	13,709	9,573	9,443
Percentage	22.9%	16.0%	15.8%
Swing	▲22.9	▲6.0	▲3.7

The 2024 MidCoast Council election was held on 14 September 2024 to elect eleven councillors to MidCoast Council. The election was held as part of the statewide local government elections in New South Wales.

The Libertarian Party won three seats, while five candidates were elected from independent groups. The Liberal Party lost all two seats it held prior to the election, owing to a missed candidate nomination deadline which prevented its councillors from recontesting.

== Electoral system ==
Like in all other New South Wales local government areas (LGAs), MidCoast Council elections use optional preferential voting. Under this system, voters are only required to vote for one candidate or group, although they can choose to preference other candidates.

All elections for councillor positions are elected using proportional representation. MidCoast has an Australian Senate-style ballot paper with above-the-line and below-the-line voting. The council is composed of a single ward.

The election was conducted by the New South Wales Electoral Commission (NSWEC).

== Retiring councillors ==
=== Independents ===
- Kathryn Bell
- Peter Epov
- Katheryn Stinson

== Candidates ==
On 14 August 2024, the day that candidates nominations closed, the Liberal Party revealed they had missed the deadline to nominate 164 candidates in 16 different LGAs. This included all Liberal councillors seeking re-election to MidCoast Council.

Howard Group (Group A)	MidCoast Independents (Group B)	Team Jeremy Miller (Group C)	Labor (Group D)	Tickle Group (Group E)
1. Peter Howard; 2. Fabian Clancy; 3. Rebecca Ross; 4. Scott Paterson; 5. Roderick Donegan; 6. Emmerson Hollis	1. Thomas O'Keefe; 2. Bruce Murray; 3. Jeanette Hart; 4. Malcolm Motum; 5. Terry Munright; 6. Heather Vaughan	1. Jeremy Miller; 2. Donna Ballard; 3. Bronwyn Sharpe; 4. Alexander Lewers; 5. Tanya Brown; 6. Jake Davey	1. Claire Pontin; 2. Digby Wilson; 3. Nicolle Green; 4. Phillip Costa; 5. Michael Burgess; 6. Mark Vanstone	1. Alan Tickle; 2. Nicole Turnbull; 3. Carley Burke; 4. Philip Walkom; 5. Michael Kent; 6. Kylie Turner
CINC (Group F)	Libertarian (Group G)	Independent (Group H)	Greens (Group I)	Ungrouped
1. Emma Mellows; 2. Veronica Frost; 3. Jennifer Lennox; 4. John Fisher	1. Michael Graham; 2. Philip Beazley; 3. Mal McKenzie; 4. Mitchell Wilson; 5. John Gazecki; 6. Stuart Cameron	1. Paul Sandilands; 2. Mark Stuart Johnson; 3. Jessica Corkill; 4. Sandra Zielke; 5. Gilbert Whyte; 6. Scott Grant	1. Dheera Smith; 2. Janeece Irving; 3. Michael Townsend; 4. Jessica Harris; 5. Nathan Wales; 6. Megan Cooke	Richard Streamer (Ind); Elizabeth McEntyre (Ind); Karen Hutchinson (Ind); Stephen Smith (Ind); John Sahyoun (Ind Nat); Vivien Panhuber (Ind)

=== Withdrawn candidates ===
Party	Candidate	Details
Liberal	Troy Fowler	Incumbent councillor unable to recontest because of missed candidacy deadline.

== Results ==
2024 MidCoast Council election
Party	Candidate	Votes	%	±%
Libertarian	1. Michael Graham (elected 4); 2. Philip Beazley (elected 5); 3. Mal McKenzie (elected 10); 4. Mitchell Wilson; 5. John Gazecki; 6. Stuart Cameron	13,709	22.9	
Labor	1. Claire Pontin (elected 3); 2. Digby Wilson (elected 8); 3. Nicolle Green; 4. Phillip Costa; 5. Michael Burgess; 6. Mark Vanstone	9,573	16.0	
Tickle Group	1. Alan Tickle (elected); 2. Nicole Turnbull (elected 9); 3. Carley Burke; 4. Philip Walkom; 5. Michael Kent; 6. Kylie Turner	9,443	15.8	
Howard Group	1. Peter Howard (elected 1); 2. Fabian Clancy; 3. Rebecca Ross; 4. Scott Paterson; 5. Roderick Donegan; 6. Emmerson Hollis	6,832	11.4	
Team Jeremy Miller	1. Jeremy Miller (elected 2); 2. Donna Ballard; 3. Bronwyn Sharpe; 4. Alexander Lewers; 5. Tanya Brown; 6. Jake Davey	6,038	10.1	
Greens	1. Dheera Smith (elected 11); 2. Janeece Irving; 3. Michael Townsend; 4. Jessica Harris; 5. Nathan Wales; 6. Megan Cooke	3,931	6.6	
MidCoast Independents	1. Thomas O'Keefe (elected 7); 2. Bruce Murray; 3. Jeanette Hart; 4. Malcolm Motum; 5. Terry Munright; 6. Heather Vaughan	3,794	6.4	
Independent	1. Paul Sandilands; 2. Mark Stuart Johnson; 3. Jessica Corkill; 4. Sandra Zielke; 5. Gilbert Whyte; 6. Scott Grant	2,750	4.6	
Consultation Is Not Consent	1. Emma Mellows; 2. Veronica Frost; 3. Jennifer Lennox; 4. John Fisher	1,313	2.2	
Independent	Karen Hutchinson	901	1.5	
Independent	Elizabeth McEntyre	554	0.9	
Independent	Stephen Smith	531	0.9	
Independent National	John Sahyoun	289	0.5	
Independent	Richard Streamer	78	0.1	
Independent	Vivien Panhuber	51	0.1	
Total formal votes		59,787	90.5	
Informal votes		6,243	9.5	
Turnout		66,030	84.3	

=== Results summary ===
2024 MidCoast Council election: Results summary
Party	Votes	%	Swing	Seats	Change
Libertarian	13,709	22.9	+22.9	3	▲3
Labor	9,573	16.0		2	▲1
Tickle Group	9,443	15.8		2	▲1
Howard Group	6,832	11.4		1	
Team Jeremy Miller	6,038	10.1		1	
Independents	4,865	8.1		0	
Greens	3,931	6.6		1	
MidCoast Independents	3,794	6.4		1	
Consultation Is Not Consent	1,313	2.2		0	
Independent National	289	0.5		0	
Formal votes	59,787	90.5			
Informal votes	6,243	9.5			
Total	66,030	100.0		111	
Registered voters / turnout	78,357	84.3			
