= Blueys Beach, New South Wales =

Beach in New South Wales, Australia

Blueys Beach
- Beach
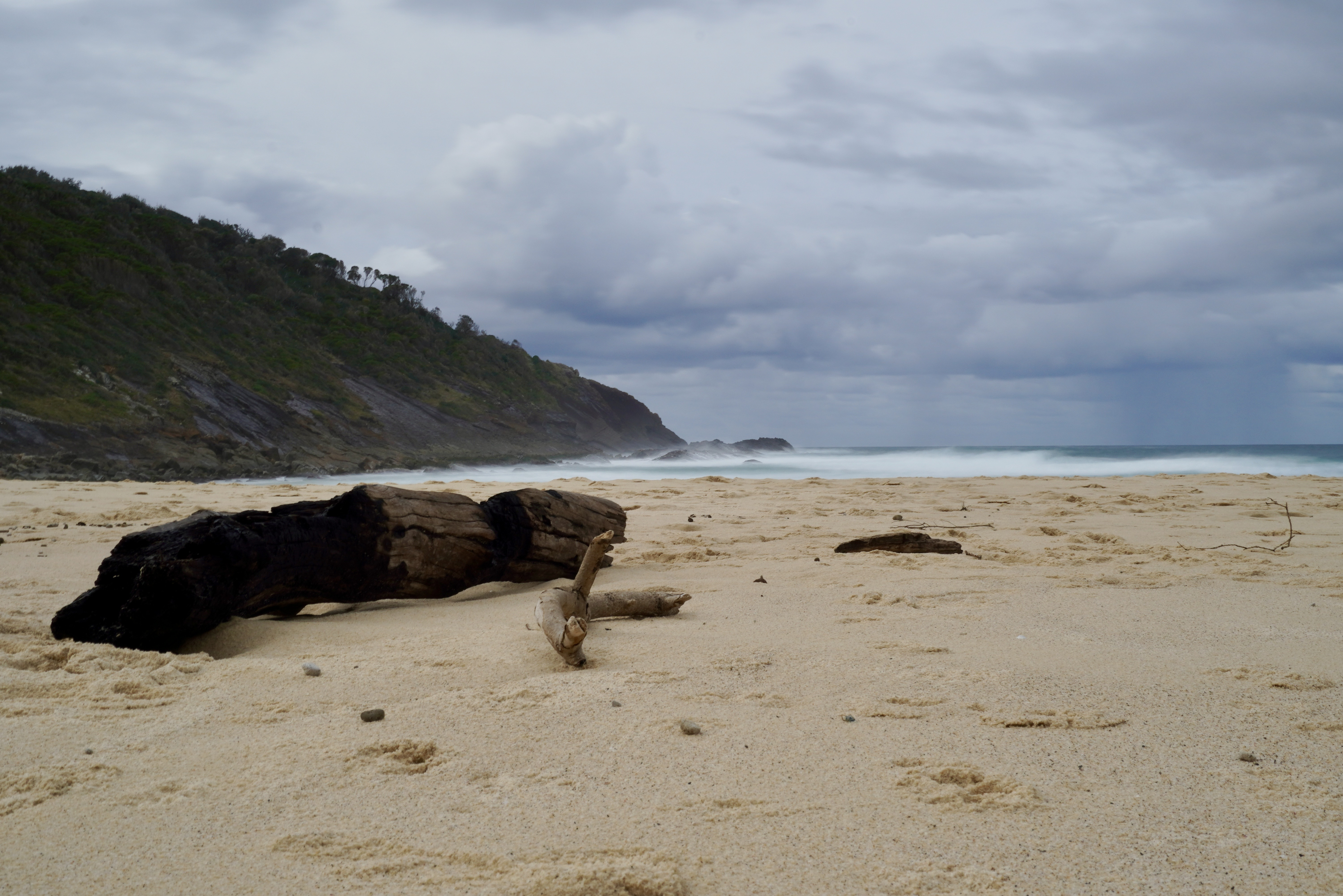
- Blueys Beach
- Interactive map of Blueys Beach
- Coordinates: 32°20′49″S 152°31′47″E
- Location: Pacific Palms, New South Wales, Australia

Dimensions
  - Length: 975 metres (3,199 ft)
- Patrolled by: None
- Hazard rating: 6/10 (Moderately hazardous)
- Access: Car and Foot

Blueys Beach is a beach and locality in the Pacific Palms area of New South Wales, Australia with a population of 668 people. Legend says that it got its name from a cow that fell off a cliff.

== Background ==
The beach stretches for 975 metres (3,199 ft) and is flanked by headland on either end. The beach is backed by steep hilly slopes 216 metres (709 ft) high, filled with vegetation and can only be accessed by foot. It is a popular tourist attraction, with thousands flocking to the area during Christmas. Although un-patrolled, It is extremely dangerous with powerful undercurrents and regular rescues. High swells and rough surf are common at times and it is regarded as the best surf beach in the area with usually consistent swell for advanced and knowledgeable surfers. There are also other beaches nearby such as Boomerang Beach, New South Wales and Elizabeth Beach, New South Wales which is safer and patrolled.
