= Krambach, New South Wales =

Krambach Gurambak (Worimi)
- Town
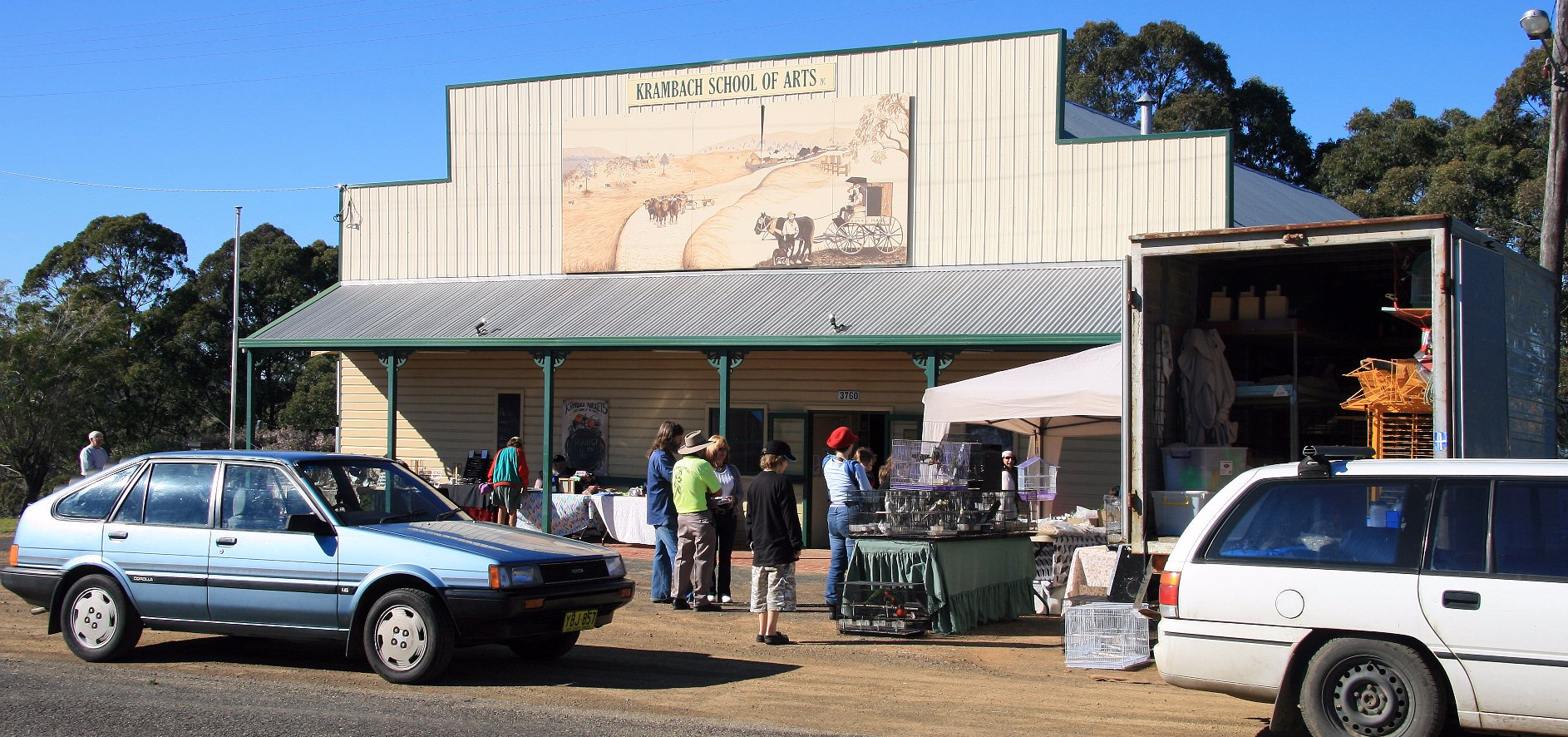
- Krambach community hall and markets

- Coordinates: 32°03′S 152°16′E
- Country: Australia
- State: New South Wales
- LGA: Mid-Coast Council
- Location: 295 km (183 mi) NE of Sydney; 39 km (24 mi) SW of Taree; 35 km (22 mi) E of Gloucester

Government
  - State electorate: Myall Lakes
  - Federal division: Lyne

Population
  - Total: 382 (2021 census)
- Postcode: 2429
- County: Gloucester
- Parish: Kundibakh

Krambach is a village in New South Wales, Australia in Mid-Coast Council. The village lies on the Bucketts Way, southwest of Taree on the Mid North Coast. Its population in the 2021 census was 382.

The Krambach Farmers Markets is held on the third Sunday of each month, from 8:00 AM to 12:00 PM.
