= Bobin, New South Wales =

Bobin New South Wales
- Coordinates: 31°43′34″S 152°17′02″E
- Population: 141 (SAL 2021)
- Postcode(s): 2429
- LGA(s): Mid-Coast
- State electorate(s): Myall Lakes
- Federal division(s): Lyne

Bobin is a small town, located in the Mid North Coast region of New South Wales, Australia.

Bobin is located approximately 334 km (208 mi) north of Sydney and about 493 km (306 mi) north-east of Canberra.

Nearby attractions include the Bulga and Ellenborough Falls.

It has one primary school: Bobin Public School (est. 1883)

The 1992 Australian animated theatrical movie, Blinky Bill: The Mischievous Koala, was filmed at a farm in Bobin.

Numerous homes and the Bobin Public School were destroyed in a fire, part of the disastrous 2019–20 Australian bushfire season. Fourteen homes were lost on one street in Bobin.
