= Back Creek, New South Wales (Tweed) =

Suburb of Tweed Shire, New South Wales, Australia

Back Creek
- Suburb
- Coordinates: 28°24′21″S 153°10′22″E
- Country: Australia
- State: New South Wales
- Region: Northern Rivers
- LGA: Tweed Shire

Government
  - State electorate: Lismore
  - Federal division: Richmond

Population
  - Total: 27 (2021 census)
- Time zone: UTC+10 (AEST)
  - Summer (DST): UTC+11 (AEDT)
- Postcode: 2484

Back Creek is a small rural locality in the Tweed Shire, part of the Northern Rivers region of New South Wales, Australia.

At the 2021 census, the town recorded a population of 27.
