= Pacific Palms, New South Wales =

Pacific Palms New South Wales
- Coordinates: 32°20′S 152°32′E
- Population: 936 (2021)
- Postcode(s): 2428
- Elevation: 11 m (36 ft)
- Location: 23 km (14 mi) South of Forster; 286 km (178 mi) North of Sydney; 42 km (26 mi) East of Bulahdelah
- LGA(s): Mid-Coast Council
- State electorate(s): Myall Lakes
- Federal division(s): Lyne
Localities around Pacific Palms:
Wallis Lake	Green Point	South Pacific
Whoota	Pacific Palms	South Pacific
Smiths Lake	Smiths Lake	South Pacific

Pacific Palms is small coastal locality in the Mid North Coast region of New South Wales (NSW), Australia, in the Mid-Coast Council local government area.

== Geography ==
The locality is bounded by Smiths Lake to the south and Booti Booti National Park to the north. It includes the villages of Blueys Beach, Elizabeth Beach, Boomerang Beach and Tiona.

== Tourism ==
A major attraction for visitors is the Green Cathedral at the north end of Pacific Palms. This outdoor cathedral is in a cabbage tree forest overlooking Wallis Lake. Blueys and Boomerang Beach are known for their beauty and surfing. Hiking trails and secluded beaches are also some of the attractions of the area.

== Demographics ==
The 2021 Census by the Australian Bureau of Statistics counted 936 people in Pacific Palms on census night. Of these 50% were male whilst 50% were female.

The majority of residents (78.2%) are of Australian birth, with other common responses being England (4.7%), New Zealand (1.6%) and Canada (0.6%).

The age distribution of Green Point residents is skewed lower than the greater Australian population. 62.1% of residents were above the age of 25 compared to the Australian average of 69.8%; and 38.9% were younger than 25 compared to the Australian average of 30.2%.

3.4% of residents identified as Indigenous Australians.
