= Killabakh, New South Wales =

Killabakh New South Wales
- Coordinates: 31°44′S 152°23′E
- Population: 248 (SAL 2021)
- Postcode(s): 2429
- Location: 339 km (211 mi) NE of Sydney; 18.9 km (12 mi) N of Wingham, New South Wales; 24.7 km (15 mi) N of Taree
- LGA(s): Mid-Coast Council
- State electorate(s): Myall Lakes
- Federal division(s): Lyne
- Website: Killabakh

Killabakh is a small village located on the Mid North Coast of New South Wales, and 339 kilometres (211 mi) north east of the state capital, Sydney.

At the 2016 census, Killabakh had a population of 274.

== Nature Reserves ==
- Goonook Nature Reserve was created in January 1999, and it covers an area of 1,016 hectares (2,511 acres)
- Killabakh Nature Reserve was created in January 1999. It covers an area of 2,644 hectares (6,533 acres)
- Coxcomb Nature Reserve was created in March 1999. It covers an area of 73 hectares (180 acres)
- Alfred Road Reserve. It covers an area of 2 hectares (5 acres)

== Annual events ==
- Killabakh a 'Day in the Country'

== Emergency services ==
- RFS
