= Tanya Thompson =

Australian politician

Tanya Thompson MP

Member of the New South Wales Assembly for Myall Lakes
- Incumbent
- Assumed office 25 March 2023
- Preceded by: Stephen Bromhead

Personal details
- Party: National Party

Tanya Louise Thompson is an Australian politician. She was elected a member of the New South Wales Legislative Assembly representing Myall Lakes for the National Party in 2023.

== Political career ==
Thompson is a small business owner who has worked in the hospitality and real estate sectors. Thompson has been a mental health advocate since her brother committed suicide in 2015. She worked as an electorate officer for her predecessor Stephen Bromhead.

New South Wales Legislative Assembly
Preceded by Stephen Bromhead	Member for Myall Lakes; 2023–present	Incumbent
