= Koorainghat, New South Wales =

Koorainghat New South Wales
- Coordinates: 31°59′21″S 152°28′29″E
- Population: 192 (2016 census)
- Postcode(s): 2430
- Location: 305.1 km (190 mi) NE of Sydney
- LGA(s): Mid-Coast Council
- County: Gloucester
- Parish: Bohnock
- State electorate(s): Myall Lakes
- Federal division(s): Lyne

Koorainghat is a coastal town in New South Wales, Australia in Mid-Coast Council.
