= Booral, New South Wales =

Booral New South Wales
- Coordinates: 32°28′12″S 151°59′05″E
- Population: 457 (SAL 2021)
- Postcode(s): 2425
- Elevation: 26 m (85 ft)
- Location: 50 km (31 mi) NE of Maitland; 31 km (19 mi) W of Bulahdelah; 34 km (21 mi) ESE of Dungog; 106 km (66 mi) SW of Taree; 215 km (134 mi) NNE of Sydney
- LGA(s): Mid-Coast Council
- State electorate(s): Upper Hunter
- Federal division(s): Lyne
Localities around Booral:
Washpool	Stroud	Girvan
Cambra	Booral	Girvan
Glen Martin	Allworth	The Branch

Booral is a locality in the Mid-Coast Council local government area in the Mid North Coast region of New South Wales, Australia. It had a population of 407 as of the 2016 census.

Booral Public School opened in October 1865. It had an enrolment of 85 students in 2017.

Booral Post Office opened in January 1874 and closed on 30 June 1986.

50.1% of residents are Christian, 39.8% have no religion, 1% are Muslim, 0.7% are Buddhists, and 7.6% haven't stated their religion.

89% of residents are born in Australia, 7% have not started their place of birth, 2% were born in the United Kingdom, 1% were born in New Zealand, and 1% were born in other countries.

== Heritage listings ==
Booral has a number of heritage-listed sites, including:

- The Bucketts Way: Gundayne House
