= John Turner (Australian politician) =

Australian politician

John Harcourt Turner OAM (born 22 April 1949) is a retired Australian politician who served as Deputy Leader of the National Party in New South Wales from 1999 to 2003 and a Member of the New South Wales Legislative Assembly representing Myall Lakes between 1988 and 2011 for the National Party.

Turner was educated at Aberdare Primary School and Sydney Grammar School. He received a Diploma of Law and practiced as a solicitor and tax agent before entering Parliament. Since entering Parliament he has received a Bachelor of Letters from Deakin University and a Bachelor of Arts from Murdoch University.

Turner was awarded the Medal of the Order of Australia in the 2023 King's Birthday Honours for "service to the people and Parliament of New South Wales".

New South Wales Legislative Assembly
New district	Member for Myall Lakes; 1988–2011	Succeeded by Stephen Bromhead
Party political offices
Preceded by George Souris	Deputy Leader of the New South Wales National Party; 1999–2003	Succeeded by Don Page
