= Back Creek, New South Wales (Mid-Coast Council) =

Back Creek
- Town
- Coordinates: 31°57′54″S 152°3′34″E
- Country: Australia
- State: New South Wales
- Region: Mid North Coast
- LGA: Mid-Coast Council

Government
  - State electorate: Upper Hunter
  - Federal division: Lyne

Population
  - Total: 20 (2021 census)
- Time zone: UTC+10 (AEST)
  - Summer (DST): UTC+11 (AEDT)
- Postcode: 2422

Back Creek is a small rural locality in the Mid-Coast Council, part of the Mid North Coast region of New South Wales, Australia.
