= Mount George, New South Wales =

Mount George
- Town
- Coordinates: 31°53′00″S 152°11′00″E
- Country: Australia
- State: New South Wales
- LGA: Mid-Coast Council
- Location: 23 km (14 mi) W of Taree

Government
  - State electorate: Myall Lakes
  - Federal division: Lyne

Population
  - Total: 337 (SAL 2021)
- Postcode: 2424

Mount George is a locality in the MidCoast Council of New South Wales. It had a population of 337 as of the 2021 census.

Mount George Public School opened in October 1874. It had an enrolment of 25 in 2015.

The Mount George Village Markets are held on the fourth Saturday of each month.

== Heritage listings ==
Mount George has a number of heritage-listed sites, including:

- North Coast railway: Mount George Rail Bridge over Manning River
