= Back Creek (Missouri) =

Stream in Missouri, U.S.

Back Creek is a stream in eastern St. Francois County, in the U.S. state of Missouri. It is a tributary of Wolf Creek which it joins about four miles southeast of Farmington, Missouri.

The headwaters arise about one mile north of Libertyvile at 37°43′06″N 90°16′43″W and the stream flows northwest to west to its confluence with Wolf Creek at 37°44′49″N 90°23′01″W.

Back Creek was named for the fact due to its irregular mouth, the creek backs up during high water.

== See also ==
- List of rivers of Missouri
