= Elizabeth Beach, New South Wales =

Beach in New South Wales, Australia

Elizabeth Beach
- Beach
- Interactive map of Elizabeth Beach
- Coordinates: 32.3316°S 152.5370°E
- Location: Elizabeth Beach, NSW 2428

Dimensions
  - Length: 0.6km
- Patrolled by: Pacific Palms SLSC
- Hazard rating: 4/10 (Moderately Hazardous)
- Access: car, foot, boat

Elizabeth Beach is a beach and locality located within the township of Pacific Palms, New South Wales.

The beaches itself measures 1km long and is surrounded by the Booti Booti National Park. The Surf Life Saving Club, established in 1986, is located in the centre of the beach. Small boats can be launched from the Southern end of Elizabeth Beach, adjacent to the creek that drains out into the surf.

There are two permanent riptides on both the north and south headland. The southern headland exists for 300m and continues until Shelly Beach. The northern point is named Seagull Point. Historically, waves at Elizabeth Beach have averaged between 0.5-1m throughout the year.

== Activities ==
Elizabeth Beach is popular among surfers and fishermen who fish along the beach or headlands.
