= Bungwahl, New South Wales =

Coordinates: 32°24′S 152°27′E

Bungwahl Bangwaal (Worimi) New South Wales
- Population: 249 (SAL 2021)
- LGA(s): MidCoast Council
- State electorate(s): Myall Lakes
- Federal division(s): Lyne

Bungwahl (Worimi: Bangwaal) is a small town in the Australian state of New South Wales, near Myall Lakes. It is close to lakes and beaches and the turnoff to Seal Rocks.

== History ==
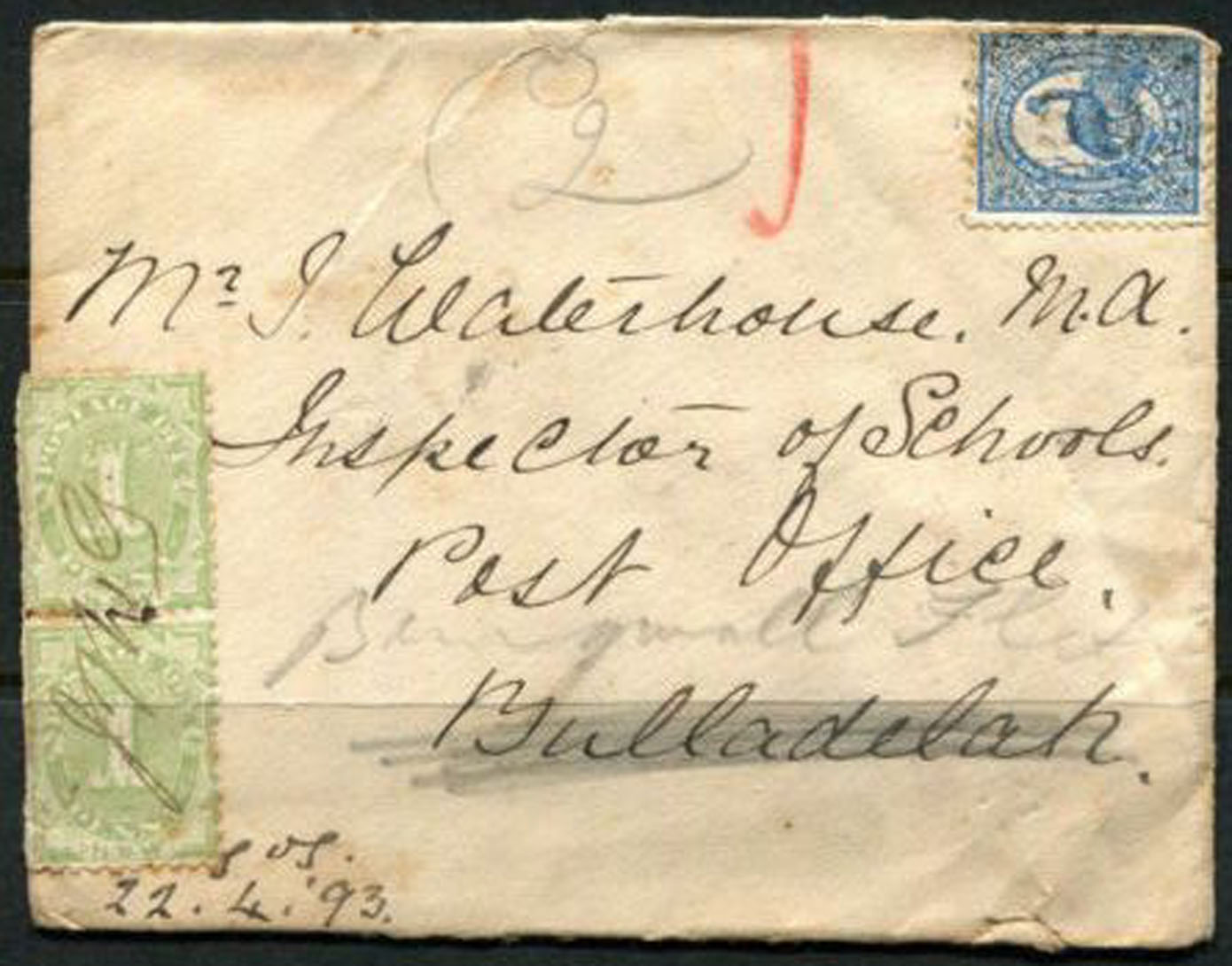
An underpaid letter to John Waterhouse readdressed to Bungwall Flat in 1893; the initials of the postmaster J. H. Grill

Bungwall Flat Post Office opened on 1 August 1875. It was renamed Bungwahl in 1896 and closed in 1993.
