= Kolodong, New South Wales =

Coordinates: 31°53′09″S 152°25′24″E

Kolodong is a locality between Taree and Wingham in the Manning Valley on the Mid North Coast of New South Wales, Australia. Kolodong contains some agricultural land, a small residential area and a sizeable industrial area. Kolodong is home to a day-care centre, Taree Baptist Church and Taree Christian College.
