= Boomerang Beach, New South Wales =

Locality in New South Wales, Australia

Boomerang Beach
- Beach
- Interactive map of Boomerang Beach
- Coordinates: 32°20′19″S 152°32′03″E
- Location: Pacific Palms, New South Wales, Australia

Dimensions
  - Length: 1.45 km (0.90 mi)
- Patrolled by: Pacific Palms SLSC in summer months
- Hazard rating: 6/10 moderately hazardous
- Access: Foot only

Boomerang Beach is a locality and beach in the township of Pacific Palms, New South Wales, 282km (175mi) by road north of Sydney. The 1.45 km beach is surrounded by the Booti Booti National Park and backed by dune vegetation.

Marine mammals such as whales and dolphins, as well as sharks frequent the water.

Recreational activities include swimming, surfing, fishing as well as snorkelling. This beach is only patrolled in summer and has moderately hazardous surf, several drownings have been recorded at Boomerang Beach.

Boomerang Beach is the home of the annual World Surf League event, The Great Lakes Pro and Surfing NSW Surf Masters.

It was named Australia's second best beach in 2023, by expert Brad Farmer.
