= Coolongolook, New South Wales =

Coolongolook
- Suburb
- Coordinates: 32°13′S 152°19′E
- Country: Australia
- State: New South Wales
- LGA: Mid-Coast Council
- Location: 267 km (166 mi) from Sydney; 128 km (80 mi) from Newcastle; 47 km (29 mi) from Taree

Government
  - State electorate: Myall Lakes
  - Federal division: Lyne

Population
  - Total: 392 (2016 census)
- Postcode: 2423

Coolongolook (/kəˈlʊŋɡʊlʊk/) is a small village in the Mid North Coast region, located within the Mid-Coast Council local government area of New South Wales, Australia. It is situated approximately 267 kilometres (166 mi) north of Sydney, on the Pacific Highway.

In the 19th century, gold was mined in the area.

At the 2016 census, the town reported a resident population of 392. The median age is 51 and Aboriginal and Torres Strait Islander people account for 11.3% of the population.

Coolongolook Public School is located on Lombard Street in the town.

In 1994, the Roads & Traffic Authority considered the environmental impact statement of a proposal for a toll road between Coolongolook and Possum Brush. The proposal was from Snowy Mountains Engineering Corporation and Travers Morgan Pty Ltd.

== See also ==
- Coolongolook, New South Wales travel guide from Wikivoyage
