= Cundletown, New South Wales =

Cundletown Gindul (Birrpayi)
- Suburb
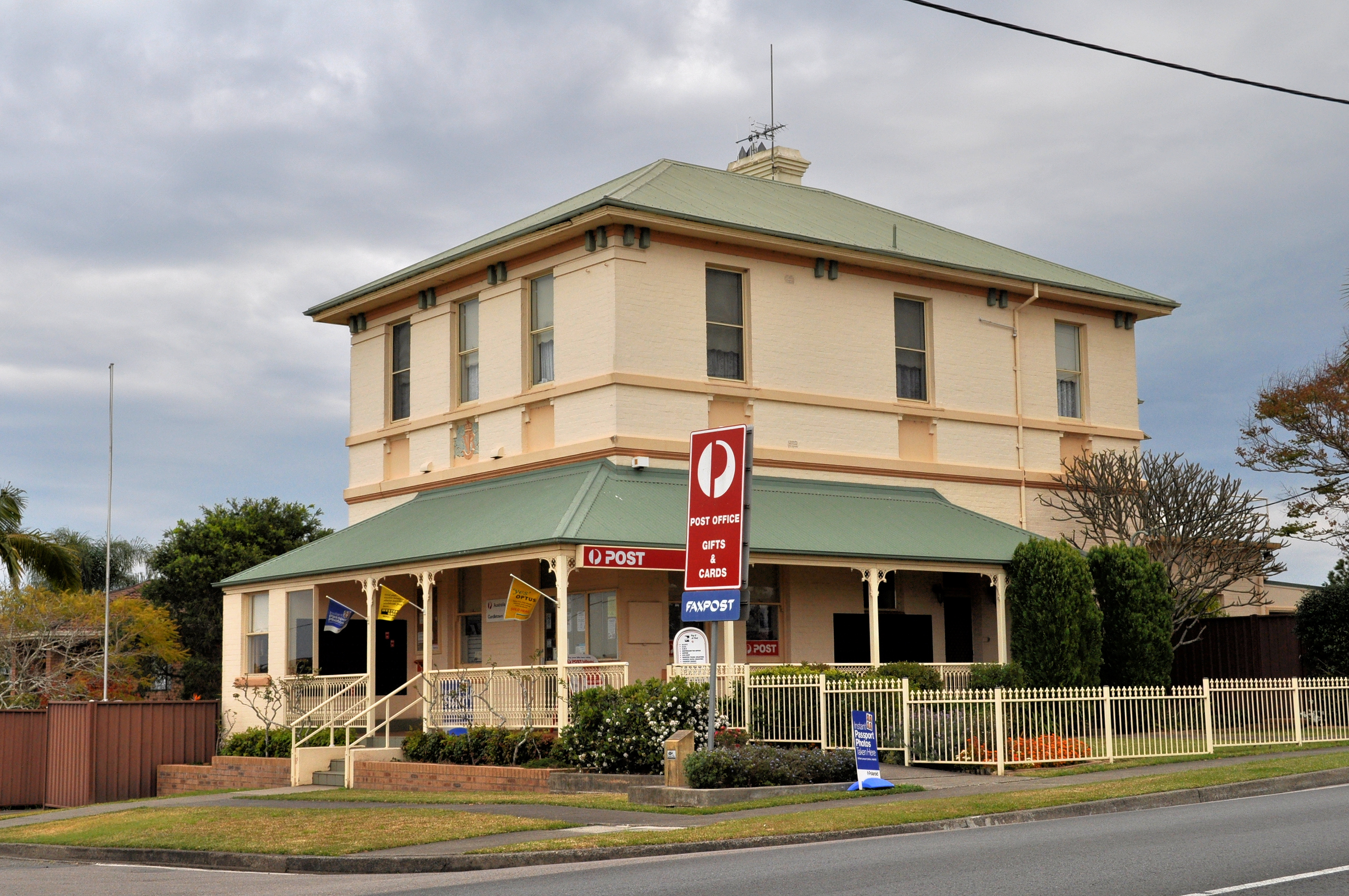
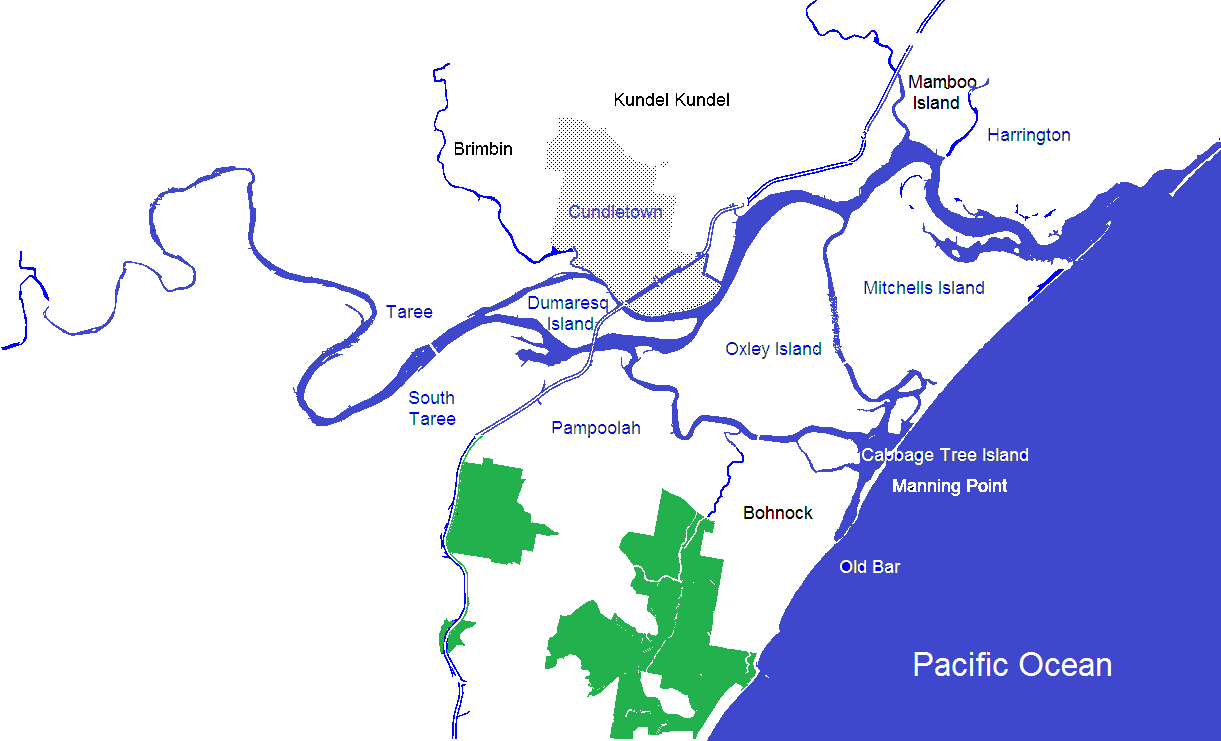
- Cundletown Post Office Map of Cundletown and surrounding area

- Coordinates: 31°53′58″S 152°31′07″E
- Country: Australia
- State: New South Wales
- City: Taree
- LGA: Mid-Coast Council
- Location: 323 km (201 mi) NNE of Sydney; 175 km (109 mi) NE of Newcastle; 8 km (5.0 mi) E of Taree; 42 km (26 mi) N of Forster

Government
  - State electorate: Myall Lakes
  - Federal division: Lyne
- Elevation: 10 m (33 ft)

Population
  - Total: 2,050 (2021 census)
- Postcode: 2430
- County: Gloucester
- Parish: Bohnock
Suburbs around Cundletown
Brimbin	Kundle Kundle	Moto
Taree	Cundletown	Ghinni Ghinni
Dumaresq Island	Dumaresq Island	Oxley Island

Cundletown (Birrpayi: Gindul) is a town on the Mid North Coast, New South Wales, Australia. Cundletown and the nearby larger town of Taree were both settled in 1831 by William Wynter. Cundletown had a population of 2,050 as of the 2021 census and is a significant agricultural district. It is 16 km (9.9 mi) from the Tasman Sea coast, and 317 km (197 mi) north of Sydney.

Cundletown is located near the Pacific Highway, while the nearest train station is at Taree, providing access to the North Coast Railway line.

Cundletown is within the local government area of Mid-Coast Council, the state electorate of Myall Lakes and the Federal electorate of Lyne.
