= Dungog Shire =

- Local government area
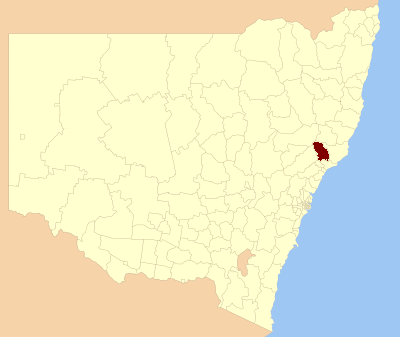
- Location in New South Wales

- Interactive map of Dungog Shire
- Coordinates: 32°24′S 151°45′E
- Country: Australia
- State: New South Wales
- Region: Hunter
- Established: 1 July 1958
- Council seat: Dungog

Government
  - Mayor: Digby Rayward (Independent)
  - State electorate: Upper Hunter
  - Federal division: Lyne

Area
  - Total: 2,251 km^{2} (869 sq mi)

Population
  - Totals: 9,195 (2015 est); 9,346 (2018 est.)
  - Density: 4.08/km^{2} (10.6/sq mi)
- Time zone: UTC+10 (AEST)
  - Summer (DST): UTC+11 (AEDT)
- Website: Dungog Shire
LGAs around Dungog Shire
Upper Hunter	MidCoast	MidCoast
Muswellbrook	Dungog Shire	MidCoast
Singleton	Maitland	Port Stephens

Dungog Shire is a local government area in the Hunter region of New South Wales, Australia. The Shire is situated adjacent to the Barrington Tops and consists predominantly of very rugged to hilly country which becomes less rugged from north to south.

Dungog Shire was formed on 1 July 1958 through the amalgamation of Wallarobba Shire with the Municipality of Dungog.

The mayor of the Dungog Shire Council is Clr. John Connors, an independent politician.

== Main towns/villages ==
The major population centres within the Shire are Dungog, Gresford, Paterson, Vacy, Martins Creek and Clarence Town. It also includes three main rivers, the Paterson River and Allyn River to the west and the Williams River to the east.

Dungog has one library, Dungog Library, in the town of Dungog. The library is part of the Newcastle Libraries Network, sharing a collection with Newcastle and Port Stephens.

== Demographics ==
At the 2011 census, there were 8,318 people in the Dungog Shire local government area, of these 50.3 per cent were male and 49.7 per cent were female. Aboriginal and Torres Strait Islander people made up 3.2 per cent of the population, which was higher than the national and state averages of 2.5 per cent. The median age of people in the Dungog Shire was 44 years, significantly higher than the national median of 37 years. Children aged 0–14 years made up 18.8 per cent of the population and people aged 65 years and over made up 17.6 per cent of the population. Of people in the area aged 15 years and over, 54.7 per cent were married and 11.5 per cent were either divorced or separated.

Population growth in the Dungog Shire between the 2001 census and the 2006 census was 2.37 per cent; and in the subsequent five years to the 2011 census, population growth was 3.18 per cent. When compared with total population growth of Australia for the same periods, being 5.78 per cent and 8.32 per cent respectively, population growth in the Dungog Shire local government area was approximately one-third of the national average. The median weekly income for residents within the Dungog Shire was lower than the national average.

At the 2011 census, the proportion of residents in the Dungog Shire local government area who stated their ancestry as Australian or Anglo-Celtic exceeded 85 per cent of all residents (national average was 65.2 per cent). In excess of 56% of all residents in the Dungog Shire nominated a religious affiliation with Christianity at the 2011 census, which was slightly higher than the national average of 50.2 per cent. Meanwhile, as at the census date, compared to the national average, households in the Dungog Shire local government area had a significantly lower than average proportion (2.0 per cent) where two or more languages are spoken (national average was 20.4 per cent); and a significantly higher proportion (95.0 per cent) where English only was spoken at home (national average was 76.8 per cent).

Selected historical census data for the Dungog Shire local government area
Census year		2001	2006	2011
Population	Estimated residents on Census night	7,875	8,062	8,318
Population	LGA rank in terms of size within New South Wales			
Population	% of New South Wales population			0.12%
Population	% of Australian population	0.04%	0.04%	0.04%
Cultural and language diversity				
Ancestry, top responses	Australian			35.4%
Ancestry, top responses	English			33.5%
Ancestry, top responses	Irish			8.8%
Ancestry, top responses	Scottish			7.6%
Ancestry, top responses	German			4.0%
Language, top responses (other than English)	German	0.2%	0.2%	0.2%
Language, top responses (other than English)	Tagalog	0.1%	▼ n/c	▲0.1%
Language, top responses (other than English)	Italian	0.1%	0.1%	0.1%
Language, top responses (other than English)	Afrikaans	0.1%	▼ n/c	▲0.1%
Language, top responses (other than English)	French	n/c	▲0.1%	0.1%
Religious affiliation				
Religious affiliation, top responses	Anglican	36.4%	▼34.2%	▲35.0%
Religious affiliation, top responses	Catholic	19.6%	▲20.1%	▼20.0%
Religious affiliation, top responses	No Religion	11.2%	▲13.7%	▲16.8%
Religious affiliation, top responses	Uniting Church	7.8%	▲8.2%	▼6.6%
Religious affiliation, top responses	Presbyterian and Reformed	7.0%	▼6.5%	▲6.6%
Median weekly incomes				
Personal income	Median weekly personal income		A$385	A$484
Personal income	% of Australian median income		82.6%	▲83.9%
Family income	Median weekly family income		A$1,059	A$1,278
Family income	% of Australian median income		90.4%	▼86.3%
Household income	Median weekly household income		A$873	A$1,005
Household income	% of Australian median income		85.0%	▼81.4%

== Council ==
=== Current composition and election method ===
Dungog Shire Council is composed of nine councillors elected proportionally in three separate wards, each electing two councillors. All councillors are elected for a fixed four-year term of office. The mayor is directly elected for the full term. The most recent election was held on 14 September 2024. An election was held in the A, B and C Wards. The makeup of the council is as follows:

Party	Councillors
Independents and Unaligned	6
Labor	1
Total	7

The current Council, elected in 2024 is:

Ward	Councillor	Party	Notes
Mayor	Digby Rayward	Independent	
A Ward	Michael Dowling	Independent	
A Ward	Liam Ley	Independent	
B Ward	Stephen Low AM	Independent	
B Ward	James Campbell	Unaligned	
C Ward	Fred Paton	Independent	
C Ward	Alexandria Carruthers	Labor	

== Election results ==
=== 2024 ===
2024 New South Wales local elections: Dungog
Party	Votes	%	Swing	Seats	Change
Independents	4,047	66.20	−10.46	3	▼1
Labor	753	12.32	+12.32	1	▲1
Independent National	664	10.86	−2.63	1	Steady
Independent Labor	649	10.62	+0.77	1	Steady
Formal votes	6,113	93.19	−2.15		
Informal votes	447	6.81	+2.15		
Total	6,560	100.0		6	
Registered voters | turnout	7,565	86.72	+0.13		

=== 2021 ===
2021 New South Wales local elections: Dungog
Party	Votes	%	Swing	Seats	Change
Independent	6,135	100.0		6	Steady
Formal votes	6,135	95.33			
Informal votes	300	4.67			
Total	6,435	100.0			

== Proposed merger ==
A 2015 review of local government boundaries by the NSW Government Independent Pricing and Regulatory Tribunal recommended that the Dungog Shire merge with adjoining councils. The government considered two proposals. The first proposed a merger of Dungog Shire and Mid-Coast Council councils to form a new council with an area of 5,200 square kilometres (2,000 sq mi) and support a population of approximately 14,000. Following the lodging of an alternate proposal by Mid-Coast Council Council to amalgamate the Gloucester, Great Lakes and Greater Taree councils, the NSW Minister for Local Government proposed a merger between the Dungog Shire and City of Maitland. In response to the government's proposal to merge the Newcastle and Port Stephens local government areas, Port Stephens Council has formally asked the government to evaluate a merger between Port Stephens and Dungog Shire. Although the Dungog Shire mayor is opposed to this merger, it is reported that the proposal has community support within both local government areas. The proposal was debated in the New South Wales parliament on 23 March 2016, with the Minister for Local Government confirming that the proposal had been referred to the Office of Local Government.
