= MidCoast Council =

- Local government area
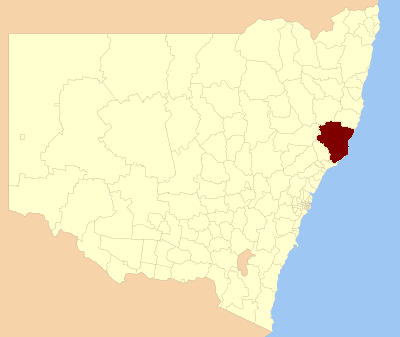
- Location in New South Wales

- Interactive map of MidCoast Council
- Coordinates: 32°00′S 151°58′E
- Country: Australia
- State: New South Wales
- Region: Mid North Coast, Hunter
- Established: 12 May 2016
- Council seat: Forster, Gloucester and Taree

Government
  - Mayor: Claire Pontin
  - State electorates: Myall Lakes; Upper Hunter; Port Macquarie; Port Stephens
  - Federal division: Lyne

Area
  - Total: 10,053 km^{2} (3,881 sq mi)

Population
  - Total: 96,579 (2021 census)
  - Density: 9.6070/km^{2} (24.8820/sq mi)
- Website: MidCoast Council
LGAs around MidCoast Council
Port Macquarie-Hastings & Walcha	Port Macquarie-Hastings	Port Macquarie-Hastings
Dungog	MidCoast Council	Tasman Sea
Port Stephens	Port Stephens	Tasman Sea

MidCoast Council is a local government area located in the Mid North Coast region of New South Wales, Australia. The council was formed on 12 May 2016 through a merger of the Gloucester Shire, Great Lakes and City of Greater Taree Councils.

The MidCoast local government area comprises an area of 10,053 square kilometres (3,881 sq mi) and occupies the southern portion of the Mid North Coast of New South Wales stretching 190 km (118 mi) between the coastal towns of Hawks Nest and Tea Gardens and northwards to Crowdy Bay National Park. The council region includes the three great lakes, the coastal towns of Seal Rocks, Forster, Taree, and onto Crowdy Head north of Harrington. The LGA extends inland to the Barrington Tops National Park west of Gloucester, plus Stroud, Bulahdelah and Wingham. It includes the Manning River and valley adjoining the Three Brothers mountains. At the time of its establishment the council had an estimated population of 90,504.

The Mayor of the MidCoast Council is Councillor Claire Pontin, who was elected on 12 January 2022.

== Towns and localities ==
The following towns and localities are located within the Mid–Coast Council area:

- Allworth
- Back Creek
- Bakers Creek
- Barrington
- Barrington Tops
- Baxters Ridge
- Belbora
- Berrico
- Bindera
- Black Head
- Blueys Beach
- Bobin
- Bohnock
- Bombah Point
- Boolambayte
- Boomerang Beach
- Booral
- Bootawa
- Booti Booti
- Bowman
- Bowman Farm
- Bretti
- Brimbin
- Bucca Wauka
- Bulahdelah
- Bulga Forest
- Bulliac
- Bundabah
- Bundook
- Bungwahl
- Bunyah
- Burrell Creek
- Cabbage Tree Island
- Caffreys Flat
- Callaghans Creek
- Caparra
- Carrington
- Cedar Party
- Cells River
- Charlotte Bay
- Cobark
- Comboyne
- Coneac
- Coolongolook
- Coomba Bay
- Coomba Park
- Coopernook
- Cooplacurripa
- Copeland
- Coralville
- Craven
- Craven Plateau
- Crawford River
- Croki
- Crowdy Bay
- Crowdy Head
- Cundle Flat
- Cundletown
- Curricabark
- Darawank
- Dewitt
- Diamond Beach
- Dingo Forest
- Dollys Flat
- Dumaresq Island
- Dyers Crossing
- Elands
- Elizabeth Beach
- Failford
- Faulkland
- Firefly
- Forbesdale
- Forster
- Gangat
- Ghinni Ghinni
- Giro
- Girvan
- Glen Ward
- Glenthorne
- Gloucester
- Gloucester Tops
- Green Point
- Hallidays Point
- Hannam Vale
- Harrington
- Hawks Nest
- Hillville
- Invergordon
- Johns River
- Jones Island
- Karaak Flat
- Karuah
- Khatambuhl
- Kia Ora
- Killabakh
- Killawarra
- Kimbriki
- Kippaxs
- Kiwarrak
- Knorrit Flat
- Knorrit Forest
- Koorainghat
- Krambach
- Kundibakh
- Kundle Kundle
- Langley Vale
- Lansdowne
- Lansdowne Forest
- Limeburners Creek
- Manning Point
- Mares Run
- Markwell
- Marlee
- Mayers Flat
- Melinga
- Mernot
- Minimbah
- Mitchells Island
- Mograni
- Mondrook
- Monkerai
- Mooral Creek
- Moorland
- Moppy
- Moto
- Mount George
- Mungo Brush
- Myall Lake
- Nabiac
- Nerong
- Nooroo
- North Arm Cove
- Number One
- Old Bar
- Oxley Island
- Pacific Palms
- Pampoolah
- Pindimar
- Possum Brush
- Purfleet
- Rainbow Flat
- Rawdon Vale
- Red Head
- Rookhurst
- Saltwater
- Sandbar
- Seal Rocks
- Shallow Bay
- Smiths Lake
- Stewarts River
- Stratford
- Strathcedar
- Stroud
- Stroud Road
- Tahlee
- Tallwoods Village
- Tarbuck Bay
- Taree
- Taree South
- Tea Gardens
- Terreel
- The Bight
- The Branch
- Tibbuc
- Tinonee
- Tiona
- Tipperary
- Tiri
- Titaatee Creek
- Tomalla
- Topi Topi
- Tugrabakh
- Tuncurry
- Upper Karuah River
- Upper Lansdowne
- Upper Myall
- Violet Hill
- Waitui
- Wallabi Point
- Wallanbah
- Wallingat
- Wallis Lake
- Wang Wauk
- Wards River
- Warranulla
- Washpool
- Waukivory
- Weismantels
- Wherrol Flat
- Whoota
- Willina
- Wingham
- Woko
- Wootton
- Yagon
- Yarratt Forest

== Heritage listings ==
MidCoast Council area has a number of heritage-listed sites, including:

- High Conservation Value Old Growth forest

== Demographics ==
The population for the predecessor councils was estimated in 2015 as:

- 5,160 in Gloucester Shire
- 36,720 in Great Lakes Council and
- 49,095 in City of Greater Taree.

== Council ==
MidCoast Council is composed of eleven councillors elected proportionally in a single ward. All councillors were elected to a fixed three-year term of office on 14 September 2024. The positions of Mayor and Deputy Mayor are chosen by councillors.

Party	Councillors
Libertarian	3
Independents	3
Alan Tickle Group	2
Labor	2
Greens	1
Total	11

The current Council, elected in 2024, in order of election, is:

Councillor	Party	Notes
Peter Howard	Independent	
Jeremy Miller	Independent	
Claire Pontin	Labor	
Alan Tickle	Independent	Alan Tickle Group
Michael Graham	Libertarian	
Phillip Beazley	Libertarian	
Thomas O'Keefe	Independent	
Digby Wilson	Labor	
Nicole Turnbull	Independent	Alan Tickle Group
Mal McKenzie	Libertarian	
Dheera Smith	Greens	

== Election results ==
=== 2024 ===
2024 MidCoast Council election: Results summary
Party	Votes	%	Swing	Seats	Change
Libertarian	13,709	22.9	+22.9	3	▲3
Labor	9,573	16.0		2	▲1
Tickle Group	9,443	15.8		2	▲1
Howard Group	6,832	11.4		1	
Team Jeremy Miller	6,038	10.1		1	
Independents	4,865	8.1		0	
Greens	3,931	6.6		1	
MidCoast Independents	3,794	6.4		1	
Consultation Is Not Consent	1,313	2.2		0	
Independent National	289	0.5		0	
Formal votes	59,787	90.5			
Informal votes	6,243	9.5			
Total	66,030	100.0		111	
Registered voters / turnout	78,357	84.3			

== See also ==
- Local government areas of New South Wales
