= Gloucester County, New South Wales =

Gloucester New South Wales
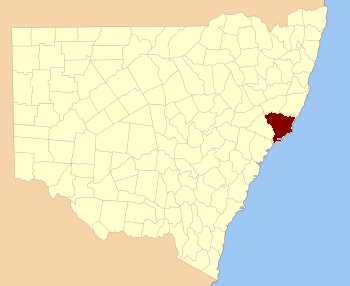
- Location in New South Wales
Lands administrative divisions around Gloucester:
Hawes	Macquarie	Pacific Ocean
Brisbane	Gloucester	Pacific Ocean
Durham	Northumberland	Pacific Ocean

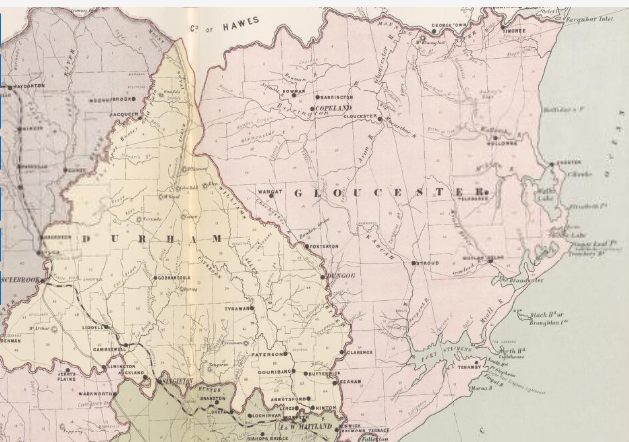
Map_of_Gloucester_County_NSW_(Australia)

Gloucester County was one of the original Nineteen Counties in New South Wales, and is now one of the 141 cadastral divisions of New South Wales. It includes the area around Port Stephens. It is bounded on the north and west by the Manning River, and on the south-west by the Williams River.

== Overview ==
Gloucester County was named after County Gloucester, England.

== Parishes within this county ==
A full list of parishes found within this county, their current LGA and mapping coordinates to the approximate centre of each location is as follows:

Parish	LGA	Coordinates
Alfred	Dungog Shire	32°13′54″S 151°45′04″E
Avon	Mid-Coast Council	32°06′54″S 151°58′04″E
Bachelor	Mid-Coast Council	32°12′54″S 152°32′04″E
Barrington	Mid-Coast Council	31°58′54″S 151°44′04″E
Beean Beean	Mid-Coast Council	31°59′54″S 151°30′04″E
Belbora	Mid-Coast Council	31°59′54″S 152°11′04″E
Berrico	Mid-Coast Council	32°05′54″S 151°47′04″E
Beryan	Mid-Coast Council	32°01′54″S 152°30′04″E
Bindera	Mid-Coast Council	31°57′54″S 151°48′04″E
Blackcamp	Dungog Shire	32°26′54″S 151°52′24″E
Bohnock	Mid-Coast Council	31°57′54″S 152°32′04″E
Boolambayte	Mid-Coast Council	32°19′54″S 152°14′04″E
Booral	Mid-Coast Council	32°27′54″S 151°58′17″E
Bootawa	Mid-Coast Council	31°56′54″S 152°19′04″E
Boranel	Mid-Coast Council	31°55′54″S 151°40′04″E
Bulahdelah	Mid-Coast Council	32°24′54″S 152°15′04″E
Carrington	Mid-Coast Council	32°37′24″S 152°00′04″E
Coolongolook	Mid-Coast Council	32°11′54″S 152°08′04″E
Coweambah	Mid-Coast Council	32°39′01″S 152°06′46″E
Craven	Mid-Coast Council	31°45′54″S 151°48′04″E
Crosbie	Mid-Coast Council	31°53′54″S 151°53′04″E
Curreeki	Mid-Coast Council	32°10′54″S 152°13′04″E
East Seaham	Port Stephens Council	32°39′54″S 151°45′04″E
Eldon	Port Stephens Council	32°43′54″S 151°45′04″E
Eurunderee	Mid-Coast Council	32°28′54″S 152°24′04″E
Euther	Mid-Coast Council	32°12′54″S 152°07′04″E
Evans	Mid-Coast Council	32°04′54″S 151°40′04″E
Faulkland	Mid-Coast Council	32°14′54″S 151°51′04″E
Fens	Mid-Coast Council	32°34′54″S 152°17′04″E
Fitzroy	Mid-Coast Council	31°59′54″S 151°52′04″E
Forster	Forster-Tuncurry Regional Council	32°17′54″S 152°30′04″E
Fosterton	Dungog Shire	32°26′04″S 151°46′14″E
Gloucester	Mid-Coast Council	31°57′54″S 151°57′04″E
Gorton	Mid-Coast Council	32°20′17″S 152°00′23″E
Grant	Mid-Coast Council	32°13′54″S 152°00′04″E
Gundaine	Mid-Coast Council	32°30′15″S 152°01′58″E
Hewong	Mid-Coast Council	32°07′54″S 151°44′04″E
Horton	Dungog Shire	32°29′04″S 151°49′34″E
Irralong	Dungog Shire	32°05′54″S 151°30′04″E
Karuah	Mid-Coast Council, Port Stephens Council	32°34′32″S 151°55′29″E
Kimbriki	Mid-Coast Council	31°55′19″S 152°12′25″E
Knowla	Mid-Coast Council	31°58′54″S 151°41′04″E
Kornga	Mid-Coast Council	31°50′54″S 151°41′04″E
Kundibakh	Mid-Coast Council	32°00′54″S 152°18′04″E
Kyle	Mid-Coast Council	32°09′54″S 152°09′04″E
Limestone	Mid-Coast Council	32°22′26″S 151°53′41″E
Milli	Mid-Coast Council	31°54′54″S 151°30′04″E
Mimi	Mid-Coast Council	32°03′54″S 152°11′04″E
Monkerai	Mid-Coast Council	32°16′54″S 151°54′04″E
Mount George	Mid-Coast Council	32°34′33″S 152°03′17″E
Myall	Mid-Coast Council	32°18′54″S 152°08′04″E
Nerong	Mid-Coast Council	32°28′54″S 152°08′04″E
Stockton	City of Newcastle	32°55′00″S 151°47′03″E
Stowell	Port Stephens Council	32°44′54″S 151°52′04″E
Stroud	Mid-Coast Council	32°23′30″S 151°59′47″E
Sutton	Port Stephens Council	32°42′54″S 151°55′04″E
Talawahl	Mid-Coast Council	32°02′54″S 152°24′04″E
Tarean	Port Stephens Council	32°37′24″S 151°54′04″E
Teleraree	Mid-Coast Council	32°13′54″S 152°12′04″E
Terreel	Mid-Coast Council	32°15′20″S 152°01′36″E
Thalaba	Dungog Shire	32°25′54″S 151°48′34″E
Tillegra	Dungog Shire	32°14′54″S 151°39′04″E
Tinonee	Mid-Coast Council	31°56′54″S 152°24′04″E
Tiri	Mid-Coast Council	31°53′54″S 151°58′04″E
Tomago	Port Stephens Council	32°48′54″S 151°44′04″E
Tomaree	Port Stephens Council	32°44′54″S 152°07′04″E
Topi Topi	Mid-Coast Council	32°21′54″S 152°22′04″E
Trevor	Mid-Coast Council	32°17′57″S 151°49′28″E
Tuncurry	Mid-Coast Council	32°05′54″S 152°30′04″E
Underbank	Dungog Shire	32°10′54″S 151°04′04″E
Verulam	Mid-Coast Council	32°19′54″S 151°54′04″E
Viney Creek	Mid-Coast Council	32°34′20″S 152°10′43″E
Wallingat	Mid-Coast Council	32°13′54″S 152°25′04″E
Wang Wauk	Mid-Coast Council	32°06′54″S 152°25′04″E
Wangat	Dungog Shire	32°14′54″S 151°42′04″E
Wawgan	Mid-Coast Council	32°01′54″S 151°39′04″E
Willabah	Mid-Coast Council	32°07′24″S 152°23′04″E
Wilmot	Port Stephens Council	32°36′54″S 151°49′04″E
Wollom	Mid-Coast Council	32°04′54″S 152°15′04″E
Womboin	Mid-Coast Council	31°57′54″S 151°30′04″E
