= Booti Booti National Park =

National park of New South Wales, Australia

- IUCN category II (national park)
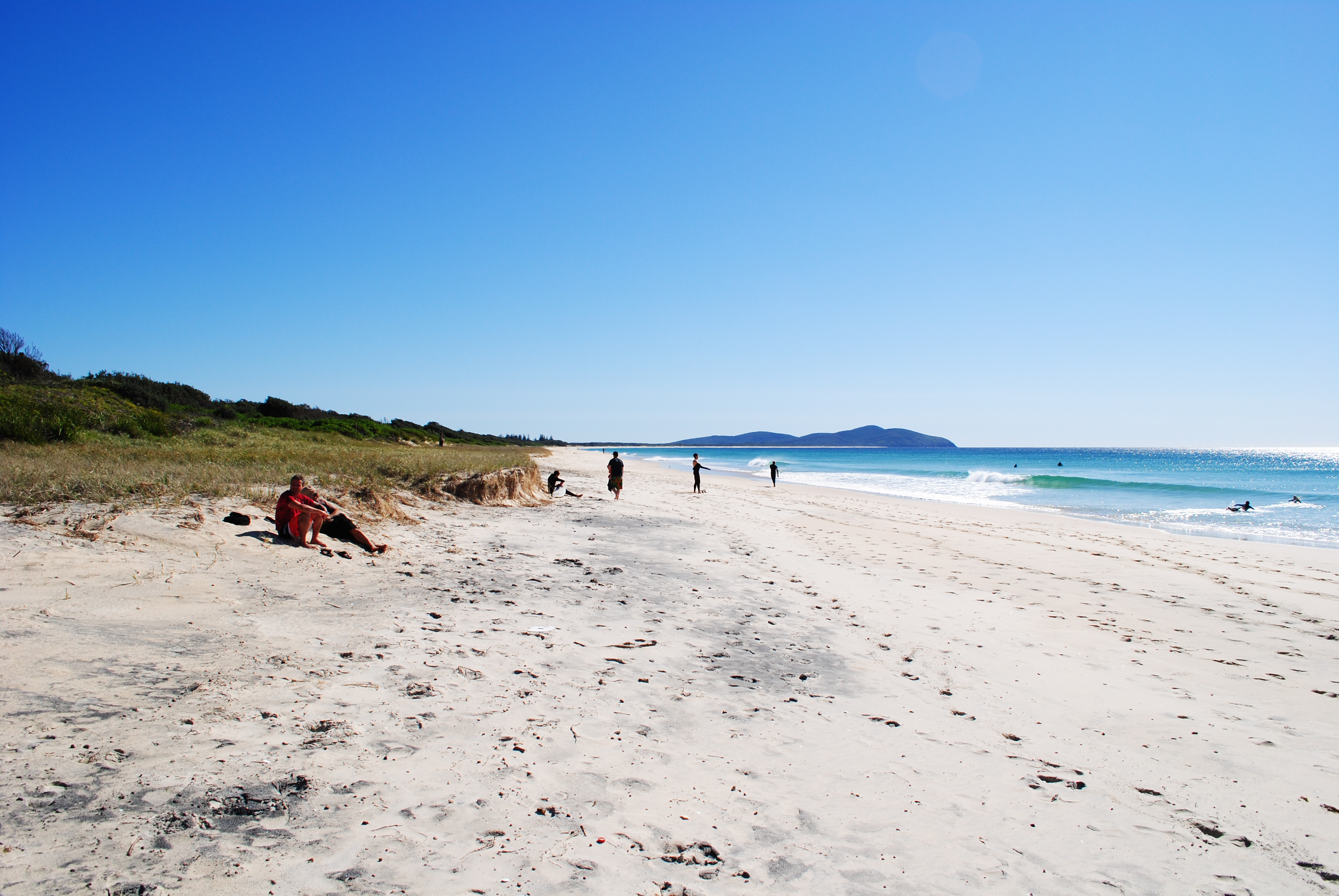
- A view of Seven Mile Beach, some of which is contained within Booti Booti National Park

- Location within New South Wales
- Location: New South Wales
- Nearest city: Forster-Tuncurry
- Coordinates: 32°14′40″S 152°32′36″E
- Area: 15.67 km^{2} (6.05 sq mi)
- Established: 1992
- Governing body: National Parks and Wildlife Service (New South Wales)

Booti Booti National Park (Worimi: Butibuti) is a national park in New South Wales, Australia, 282 kilometres (175 mi), by road, north-north-east of Sydney. The holiday town of Forster-Tuncurry lies immediately to the north.

== History ==
The first European to inhabit the area was a Captain J. Gogerly who sailed from Forster to Sydney with loads of timber. He and some of his family are buried in the park. Mining for mineral sands took place at Seven Mile Beach from 1969 to 1975, and at Elizabeth Beach from 1969 to 1970. The park was declared a state recreation area from 30 September 1977, then a national park in 1992.

== Geography ==
Geographically, the national park is made up of three hill complexes – the 224 metres (735 ft) high Cape Hawke to the north, and 169 metres (554 ft) high Booti Hill and 96 metres (315 ft) high Charlotte Head in the southern end. The three areas are connected by low–lying estuarine and aeolian sands. The stretch of land between Cape Hawke and Booti Hill is around 10 kilometres (6.2 mi) long and ranges between 400 metres (1,300 ft) and 3.25 kilometres (2.02 mi) wide. It separates Wallis Lake from the ocean. Cape Hawke and Charlotte Head were once islands, which became joined to the mainland by built-up sand deposits.

== Flora ==
654 species of native plants have been recorded from Booti Booti National Park. This formed 46 distinct plant communities within the park boundaries. 17% of the park is classified as rainforest. Seven distinct wet sclerophyll forest and ten dry sclerophyll forest communities have been recorded.

Five species recognised as threatened by the New South Wales Government occur within the park – these are Allocasuarina defungens, A. simulans, Chamaesyce psammogeton, Cynanchum elegans and Senna acclinis.

104 exotic species have been recorded from the park. Bitou bush (Chrysanthemoides monilifera var. rotundata) has infested sand dunes and cliff areas, having spread from nearby beach habitat. Lantana camara infests the rainforest at Cape Hawke, particularly disturbed habitat. Madeira vine (Anredera cordifolia) and coast morning glory (Ipomoea cairica) are vines that grow over and smother native vegetation in the park.

== Fauna ==
Booti Booti National Park has had 210 species of bird recorded within its limits.

== Activities ==
Activities at Booti Booti National Park include hiking, swimming, birdwatching, mooning and, during winter, whale watching. Camping sites are located at The Ruins, in the Booti Hill area at the park's southern end. A lookout is located on top of Cape Hawke.

== See also ==
- List of reduplicated Australian place names
- Protected areas of New South Wales
- Booti Booti National Park travel guide from Wikivoyage
