= Electoral district of Myall Lakes =

State electoral district of New South Wales, Australia

Myall Lakes New South Wales—Legislative Assembly
- Interactive map of district boundaries from the 2023 state election
- State: New South Wales
- Dates current: 1988–present
- MP: Tanya Thompson
- Party: The Nationals
- Namesake: Myall Lakes
- Electors: 61,336 (2023)
- Area: 5,023.82 km^{2} (1,939.7 sq mi)
- Demographic: Provincial and rural
Electorates around Myall Lakes:
Northern Tablelands	Oxley	Port Macquarie
Maitland	Myall Lakes	Pacific Ocean
Upper Hunter	Port Stephens	Pacific Ocean

Myall Lakes is an electoral district of the Legislative Assembly in the Australian state of New South Wales. It was represented by Stephen Bromhead of The Nationals until his death in 2023.

Myall Lakes covers most of the Mid-Coast Council in the Mid North Coast region which includes the suburbs and towns of Forster, Tuncurry, Bulahdelah, Nabiac, Failford, Pacific Palms, Smiths Lake, Bungwahl, Coolongolook and Wootton, Taree, Cundletown, Wingham, Tinonee, Old Bar, Krambach, Nabiac, Possum Brush and Hallidays Point.

== History ==
Myall Lakes was created in 1988, partly replacing Gloucester.

== Members for Myall Lakes ==
Member	Party	Term
John Turner	National	1988–2011
Stephen Bromhead	National	2011–2023
Tanya Thompson	National	2023–present

== Election results ==
2023 New South Wales state election: Myall Lakes
Party	Candidate	Votes	%	±%
National	Tanya Thompson	24,809	47.1	−1.5
Independent	Jason Bendall	9,567	18.2	+18.2
Labor	Mark Vanstone	9,460	18.0	−11.2
Legalise Cannabis	Keys Manley	4,747	9.0	+9.0
Greens	Eleanor Spence	2,843	5.4	−0.2
Sustainable Australia	Maree McDonald-Pritchard	1,260	2.4	+0.7
Total formal votes		52,686	96.7	+0.1
Informal votes		1,786	3.3	−0.1
Turnout		54,472	88.8	−1.7
Two-party-preferred result
National	Tanya Thompson	28,362	65.8	+6.5
Labor	Mark Vanstone	14,731	34.2	−6.5
National hold		Swing	+6.5	
