= Thunderbolts Way =

Road in New South Wales, Australia

Thunderbolts Way Bundarra Road New South Wales
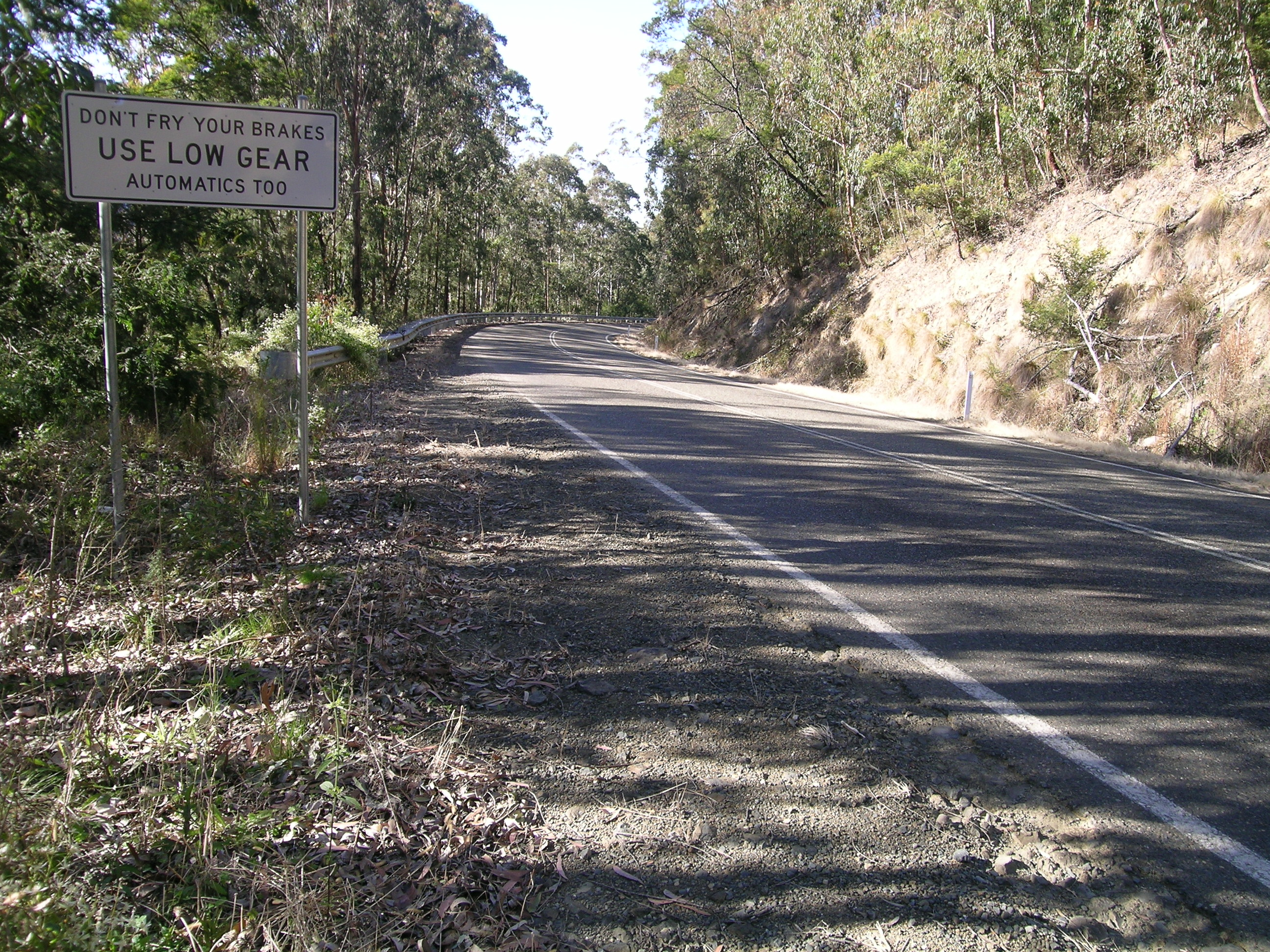
- Warning sign on Thunderbolts Way
- Coordinates: 29.779795°S 151.119151°E (North end); 32.005933°S 151.958648°E (South end)

General information
- Type: Rural road
- Length: 304.7 km (189 mi)
- Gazetted: August 1928 (as Main Roads 115 and 122); December 1934 (as Trunk Road 73)

Major junctions
- North end: Gwydir Highway; Inverell, New South Wales
- New England Highway; Oxley Highway
- South end: Bucketts Way; Gloucester, New South Wales

Location(s)
- Major settlements: Bundarra, Uralla, Walcha, Barrington

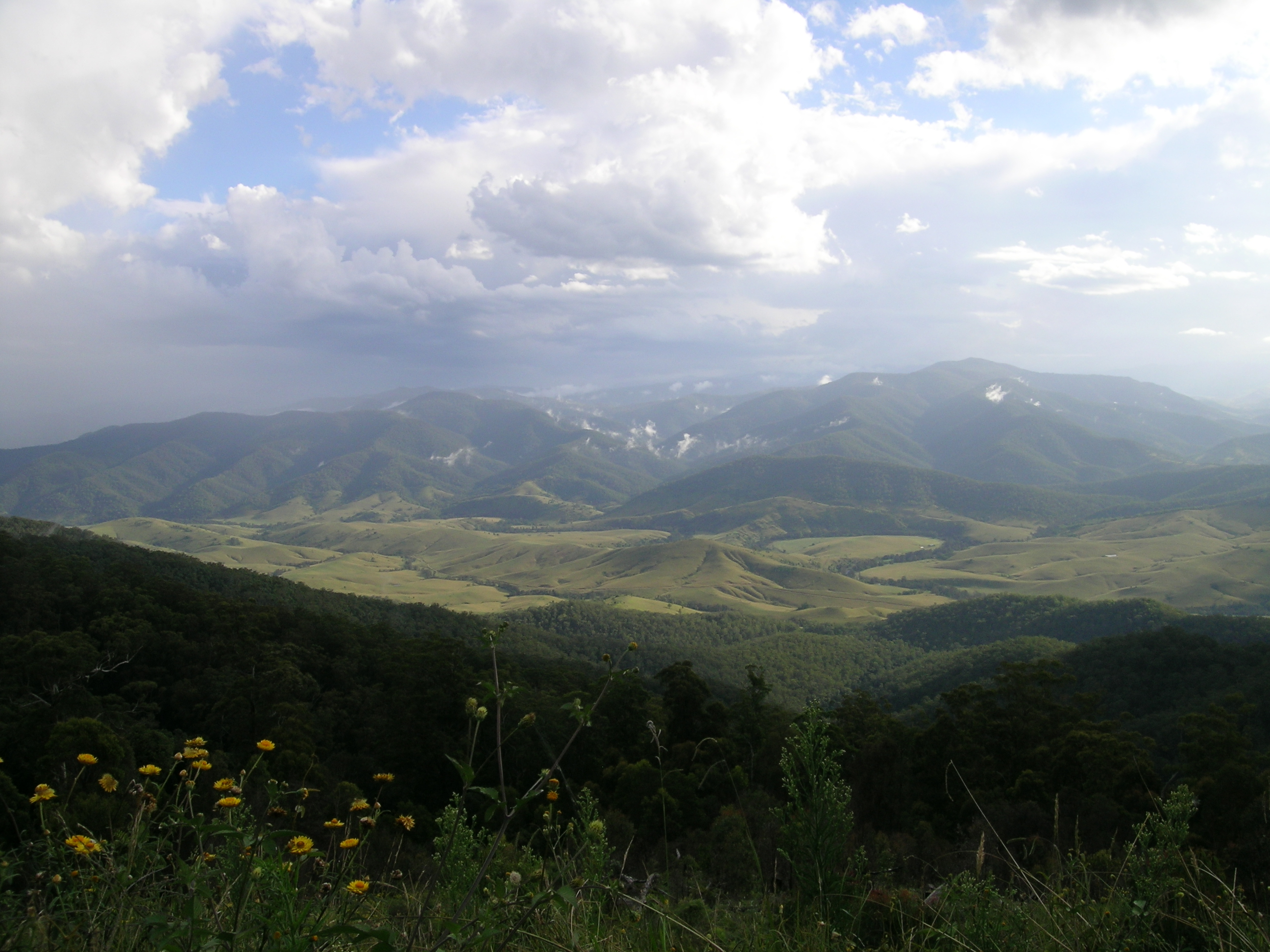
View from Carson's Lookout, Thunderbolt's Way, Gloucester

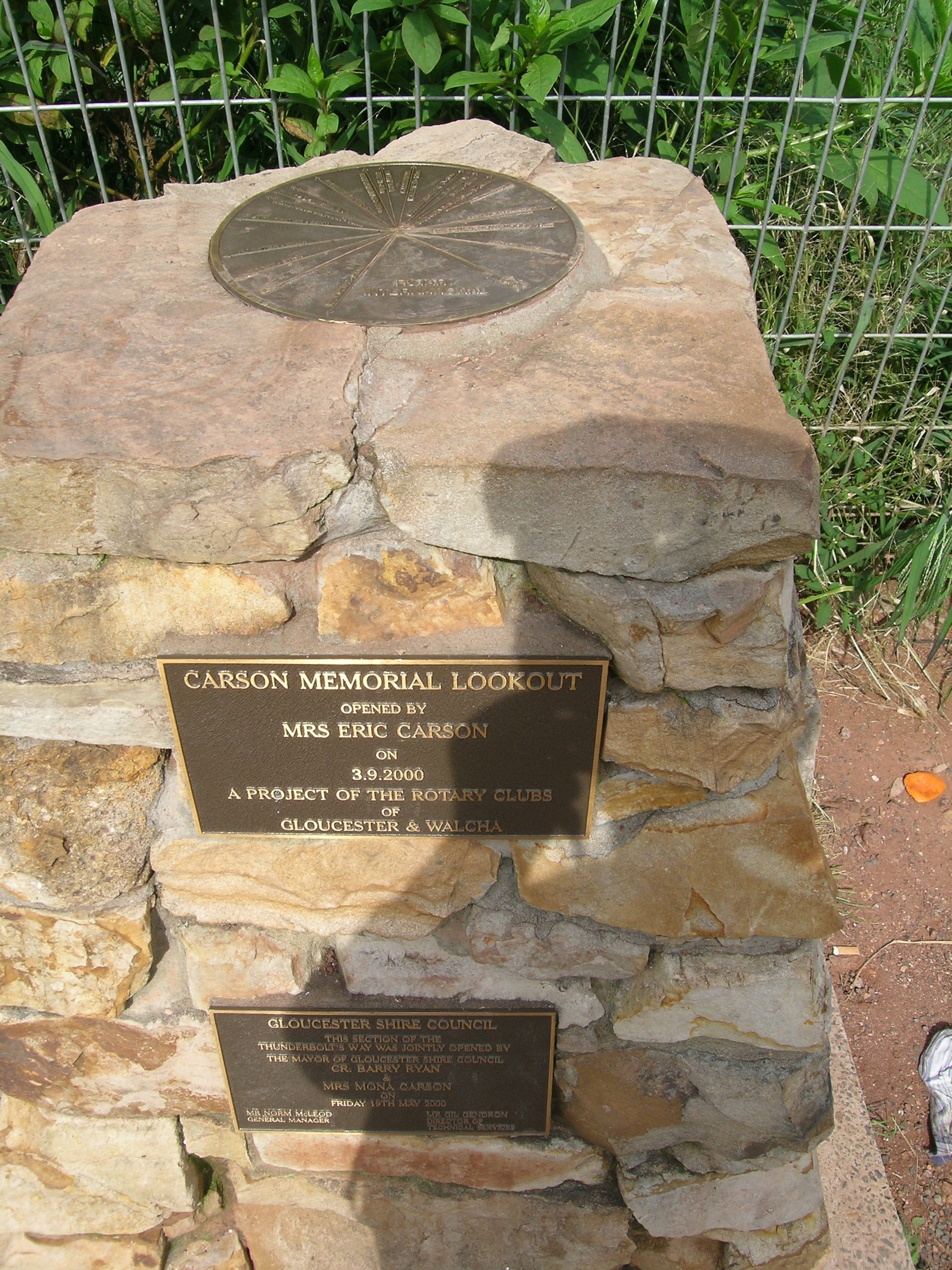
Monument commemorating the opening of a section of Thunderbolts Way

Thunderbolts Way (and at its northern end as Bundarra Road) is a 305-kilometre (190 mi) country road located in the Northern Tablelands region of New South Wales, Australia, linking Inverell via Bundarra, Uralla and Walcha to Gloucester The road is sealed and passes through thickly forested mountain areas with many nearby national parks and nature reserves.

It is named after a local bushranger, Frederick Ward, alias Captain Thunderbolt, who roamed these parts in the 19th century.

== Route ==
Thunderbolts Way is very hilly and winding as it passes across the Great Dividing Range. It is very popular with tourists, including motorcyclists, as it offers many pristine picnic and fishing spots. Riverside camping spots are available at Gloryvale Reserve and Bretti Reserve. There is also a picnic area, with toilets, near the Barrington River bridge.

Occasionally a dingo, koala or wombat may be among the animals to be spotted on this route. Bellbirds are frequently heard shortly after beginning the ascent up the mountain.

The only villages between Gloucester and Walcha are Barrington and Nowendoc, which is slightly north of this road. There is a public school and church at the hamlet of Rookhurst. After passing through Walcha, Dangar's Lagoon is situated close to Uralla where a statue of Captain Thunderbolt on horseback is located on the intersection of the New England Highway and Thunderbolts Way.

After passing Uralla the Mount Yarrowyck Nature Reserve is near the junction of the Armidale Road and Thunderbolts Way. This site protects an Aboriginal cave painting site and much of the natural environment of Mount Yarrowyck.

A new bridge constructed in 2015 crosses the Gwydir River shortly before reaching the Kingstown Road intersection and then the village of Bundarra. Once again the Gwydir River is crossed, this time by the Bundarra Bridge, a five-span iron lattice truss bridge, that was constructed in 1881. This bridge is 204 metres (669 ft) long and 5.6 metres (18 ft) wide between kerbs. It has been listed on the Register of the National Estate, being of state significance due to its design, historical value and aesthetic appearance. The next village encountered is Gilgai which is situated about 10 km (6 mi) south of Inverell.

== History ==
Eric Carson (1913–99), a Gloucester sawmiller and road builder, carved the first road through the ranges to bring out the magnificent hardwood from the forests on the Great Divide. After Carson spent many years trying to persuade local politicians that a road should be built across the Divide from Gloucester to Nowendoc, he went ahead and built it. Carving the 32 km (20 mi) route out of some of the steepest and most rugged countryside in the state was fraught with danger, but by 1961 it was complete. Carson's Lookout, which commemorates his work is between Gloucester and Nowendoc, is a stop off point for the enjoyment of panoramic views.

The passing of the Main Roads Act of 1924 through the Parliament of New South Wales provided for the declaration of Main Roads, roads partially funded by the State government through the Main Roads Board (MRB, later Transport for NSW). Main Road No. 115 was declared from the intersection with Oxley Highway in Walcha, via Uralla, Balala, Bundarra and Gilgai to the intersection with Gwydir Highway at Inverell, Main Road No. 122 was declared from the intersection with Great Northern Highway (today New England Highway) at Uralla to Yarrowyck, and Main Road No. 124 was declared from Yarrowyck to Bundarra (and continuing eastwards to Armidale) on the same day, 8 August 1928. With the passing of the Main Roads (Amendment) Act of 1929 to provide for additional declarations of State Highways and Trunk Roads, this was amended to Main Roads 115 and 122 and 124 on 8 April 1929.

The Department of Main Roads, which had succeeded the MRB in 1932, declared Trunk Road 73 on 11 December 1934, from the intersection with Gwydir Highway at Inverell via Gilgai, Bundarra, Yarrowyck and Uralla to the intersection with Oxley Highway, subsuming the former alignments of Main Road 115 (between Inverell and Bundarra, and Uralla and Walcha; the former route between Bundarra and Uralla via Balala was removed) and Main Road 122; the western end of Main Road 124 was truncated to meet Trunk Road 73 at Yarrowyck.

The route was renamed Thunderbolts Way in the early 1990s over a 19-month period in sections: by Gloucester Shire between Walcha and Gloucester on 16 May 1990; by Guyra Shire between Copes Creek (30km south of Inverell) and Bundarra on 19 August 1991; and by Uralla Shire between Bundarra and Walcha on 21 December 1991. The portion of Trunk Road 73 within Inverell Shire (between Inverell and Copes Creek) is still known by its original name, Bundarra Road.

The passing of the Roads Act of 1993 updated road classifications and the way they could be declared within New South Wales. Under this act, Thunderbolts Way today retains its declaration as Main Road 73, from Inverell to Walcha. The road from Walcha to Gloucester has been since classified as Regional Road 7719.

== Major junctions ==
LGA	Location	km	mi	Destinations	Notes
Inverell	Inverell	0.0	0.0	Gwydir Highway (B76) – Glen Innes, Grafton, Moree	Northern terminus of Bundarra Road
Macintyre River		0.2	0.12	O'Connor Bridge	
Inverell	Gilgai	9.5	5.9	Guyra Road – Tingha, Guyra, Inverell Airport	
Inverell	Gilgai	16.1	10.0	Bundarra Road	Southern terminus of Bundarra Road
Copes Creek		16.1	10.0	Bridge over the river (Bridge name not known)	
Uralla	Howell	16.1	10.0	Thunderbolts Way	Northern terminus of Thunderbolts Way
Gwydir River		44.9	27.9	Lone Pine Bridge	
Uralla	Bundarra	47.4	29.5	Gwydir River Road – Tamworth	Y-intersection
Gwydir River		47.9	29.8	Emu Crossing Bridge	
Laura Creek		56.0	34.8	Laura Creek Bridge	
Abington Creek		64.8	40.3	Abington Bridge	
Gwydir River		96.8	60.1	Bridge over the river (Bridge name not known)	
Rocky River		110.0	68.4	Maitland Point Bridge	
Uralla	Uralla	117.6	73.1	New England Highway (A15 north) – Armidale	4-way intersection; concurrency with New England Highway
Uralla	Uralla	117.9	73.3	New England Highway (A15 south) – Tamworth	4-way intersection; concurrency with New England Highway
Walcha	Walcha	158.9	98.7	Oxley Highway Tamworth, Gunnedah, Coonabarabran, Port Macquarie	
Walcha	Walcha	206.2	128.1	Topdale Road – Tamworth	
Walcha	Nowendoc	229.1	142.4	Nowendoc Road Nowendoc	
Barnard River		267.1	166.0	Bridge over the river (Bridge name not known)	
Manning River		271.3	168.6	Bridge over the river (Bridge name not known)	
Manning River		278.0	172.7	Bridge over the river (Bridge name not known)	
Manning River		282.4	175.5	Bridge over the river (Bridge name not known)	
Bowman River		291.9	181.4	Bridge over the river (Bridge name not known)	
Gloucester	Barrington	296.8	184.4	Scone Road – Scone	T-intersection
Barrington River		297.4	184.8	Barrington Bridge	
Gloucester River		303.7	188.7	Bridge over the river (Bridge name not known)	
Gloucester	Gloucester	304.7	189.3	Bucketts Way – Nabiac, Stroud	Southern terminus of Thunderbolts Way at roundabout
1.000 mi = 1.609 km; 1.000 km = 0.621 mi: Concurrency terminus; Route transition

== See also ==
- Highways in Australia
- List of highways in New South Wales
