= Lee Creek (New South Wales) =

Coordinates: 32°29′S 150°08′E

Lee Creek Benjang Creek

Location
- Country: Australia
- State: New South Wales
- Region: NSW South Western Slopes (IBRA), Central Tablelands
- Local government area: Mid-Western Regional
- Town: Bylong

Physical characteristics
- Source: Great Dividing Range
  - location: below Thompsons Hole
  - elevation: 808 m (2,651 ft)
- Mouth: confluence with the Bylong River
  - location: near Bylong
  - elevation: 265 m (869 ft)
- Length: 42 km (26 mi)

Basin features
- River system: Hunter River catchment

Lee Creek, a partly perennial river of the Hunter River catchment, is located in the Central Tablelands region of New South Wales, Australia.

== Course and features ==
Officially designated as a river, the Lee Creek rises on the northern slopes of the Great Dividing Range, below Thompsons Hole, northeast of Rylstone. The river flows generally north northwest then north reaching its confluence with the Bylong River near Bylong. The river descends 542 metres (1,778 ft) over its 37 kilometres (23 mi) course.

== See also ==
- List of rivers of Australia
- List of rivers of New South Wales (A-K)
- Rivers of New South Wales
