= Gloucester Advocate =

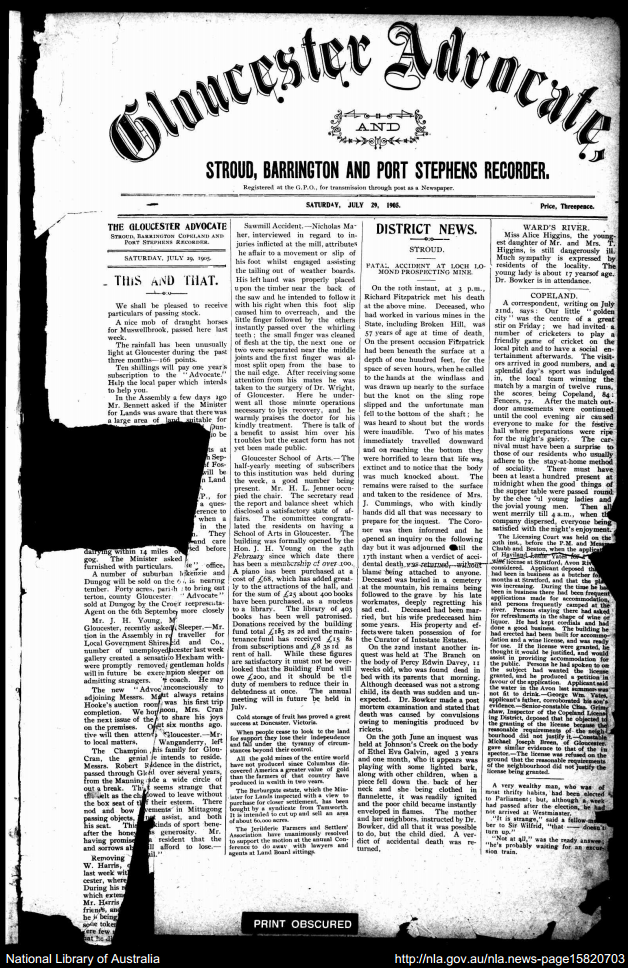
Front page of The Gloucester Advocate on 29 July 1905.

Gloucester Advocate is a weekly local newspaper published in Gloucester, New South Wales, Australia.

== Newspaper history ==
The Gloucester Advocate was founded by Frank Townshend. Townshend was from a family of journalists and newspaper printers and had previously been involved with the setting up of newspapers in Cape Town, New Zealand, Newcastle and the Walcha Witness in Balgowlah, New South Wales, which he edited and printed for over 40 years. Townshend arrived in Gloucester in 1905 to commence a paper there and released the first issue of Gloucester Advocate on 8 July. This corresponded with the time that Australian Agricultural Company's 500,000 acre estate was being subdivided.

Fifteen months later, Townshend sold the newspaper to the Rye family in October 1906. The Rye family managed the newspaper for 57 years, until they sold it to Manning River Times Pty Ltd in June 1964.

In September 2024, Australian Community Media announced it will shutter the paper. However, as of March 2025, the newspaper was still being published every Wednesday.

== Digitisation ==
The paper has been digitised as part of the Australian Newspapers Digitisation Program project of the National Library of Australia.

== See also ==
- List of newspapers in Australia
- List of newspapers in New South Wales
