= Gloucester Shire =

Former local government area in New South Wales, Australia

- Local government area
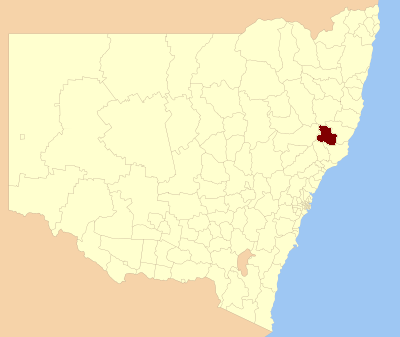
- Location in New South Wales
- Coordinates: 32°00′S 151°58′E
- Country: Australia
- State: New South Wales
- Region: Hunter, Mid North Coast
- Established: 7 March 1906
- Abolished: 12 May 2016
- Council seat: Gloucester

Government
  - Mayor: John Rosenbaum
  - State electorate: Upper Hunter
  - Federal division: Lyne

Area
  - Total: 2,952 km^{2} (1,140 sq mi)

Population
  - Total: 4,877 (2011 census)
  - Density: 1.6521/km^{2} (4.2789/sq mi)
- Time zone: UTC+10 (AEST)
  - Summer (DST): UTC+11 (AEDT)
- Website: Gloucester Shire
LGAs around Gloucester Shire
Tamworth	Walcha	Greater Taree
Upper Hunter	Gloucester Shire	Greater Taree
Dungog	Great Lakes	Greater Taree

Gloucester Shire (/ˈɡlɒstər/ GLOST-ər) was a local government area in the Mid North Coast and Upper Hunter regions of New South Wales, Australia. The Shire was situated adjacent to the Bucketts Way and the North Coast railway line.

The last mayor of the Gloucester Shire Council was John Rosenbaum, an independent politician.

== Towns and localities ==
The Shire included the following towns and localities:

- Gloucester
- Gloucester Tops
- Barrington
- Barrington Tops
- Copeland
- Craven
- Stratford

== Amalgamation ==
A 2015 review of local government boundaries by the NSW Government Independent Pricing and Regulatory Tribunal recommended that the Gloucester Shire merge with adjoining councils. The government considered two proposals. The first proposed a merger of Gloucester Shire and Dungog Shire councils to form a new council with an area of 5,200 square kilometres (2,000 sq mi) and support a population of approximately 14,000. Following the lodging of an alternate proposal by Gloucester Shire Council to amalgamate the Gloucester, Great Lakes and Greater Taree councils, the NSW Minister for Local Government proposed a merger between the Dungog Shire and City of Maitland.

The council was dissolved on 12 May 2016 and the area included in the Mid-Coast Council, along with city of Greater Taree and Great Lakes Council.

== Demographics ==
At the 2011 census, there were 4,877 people in the Gloucester Shire local government area, of these 49.8 per cent were male and 50.2 per cent were female. Aboriginal and Torres Strait Islander people made up 4.7 per cent of the population, which was significantly higher than the national and state averages of 2.5 per cent. The median age of people in the Gloucester Shire was 50 years, which was significantly higher than the national median of 37 years. Children aged 0 – 14 years made up 16.0 per cent of the population and people aged 65 years and over made up 26.0 per cent of the population. Of people in the area aged 15 years and over, 54.7 per cent were married and 13.1 per cent were either divorced or separated.

Population growth in the Gloucester Shire between the 2001 census and the 2006 census was 2.54 per cent; and in the subsequent five years to the 2011 census, population growth was 1.56 per cent. When compared with total population growth of Australia for the same periods, being 5.78 per cent and 8.32 per cent respectively, population growth in the Gloucester Shire local government area was approximately one-third of the national average. The median weekly income for residents within the Gloucester Shire was significantly lower than the national average.

At the 2011 census, the proportion of residents in the Gloucester Shire local government area who stated their ancestry as Australian or Anglo-Saxon exceeded 86 per cent of all residents (national average was 65.2 per cent). In excess of 66% of all residents in the Gloucester Shire nominated a religious affiliation with Christianity at the 2011 census, which was significantly higher than the national average of 50.2 per cent. Meanwhile, as at the census date, compared to the national average, households in the Gloucester Shire local government area had a significantly lower than average proportion (2.0 per cent) where two or more languages are spoken (national average was 20.4 per cent); and a significantly higher proportion (96.0 per cent) where English only was spoken at home (national average was 76.8 per cent).

Selected historical census data for the Gloucester Shire local government area
Census year		2001	2006	2011
Population	Estimated residents on Census night	4,683	4,802	4,877
Population	LGA rank in terms of size within New South Wales			
Population	% of New South Wales population			0.07%
Population	% of Australian population	0.02%	0.02%	0.02%
Cultural and language diversity				
Ancestry, top responses	Australian			36.3%
Ancestry, top responses	English			34.8%
Ancestry, top responses	Scottish			9.0%
Ancestry, top responses	Irish			6.7%
Ancestry, top responses	German			3.5%
Language, top responses (other than English)	German	0.3%	▼0.1%	▲0.3%
Language, top responses (other than English)	Cantonese	n/c	▲0.1%	▲0.2%
Language, top responses (other than English)	Dutch	0.1%	0.1%	▲0.2%
Language, top responses (other than English)	Italian	n/c	n/c	▲0.2%
Language, top responses (other than English)	French	0.1%	▲0.2%	▼0.1%
Religious affiliation				
Religious affiliation, top responses	Anglican	40.4%	▼37.5%	▼36.3%
Religious affiliation, top responses	No Religion	9.8%	▲12.1%	▲16.5%
Religious affiliation, top responses	Catholic	16.5%	▼15.7%	▼15.5%
Religious affiliation, top responses	Presbyterian and Reformed	8.9%	▼8.0%	▼7.7%
Religious affiliation, top responses	Uniting Church	8.1%	▼7.3%	7.3%
Median weekly incomes				
Personal income	Median weekly personal income		A$343	A$422
Personal income	% of Australian median income		73.6%	▼73.1%
Family income	Median weekly family income		A$846	A$971
Family income	% of Australian median income		72.2%	▼65.6%
Household income	Median weekly household income		A$665	A$810
Household income	% of Australian median income		64.8%	▲65.6%

== Council ==
=== Composition and election method ===
At the time of dissolution, Gloucester Shire Council was composed of seven councillors, elected proportionally as a single ward. All councillors were elected for a fixed four-year term of office. The mayor was elected by the councillors at the first meeting of the council. The last election was held on 8 September 2012, and the makeup of the council was as follows:

Party	Councillors
Independents and Unaligned	7
Total	7

The last Council, elected in 2012 and dissolved in 2016, in order of election, was:

Councillor	Party	Notes
Frank Hooke	Unaligned	Deputy Mayor
Aled Hoggett	Independent	
John Rosenbaum	Independent	Mayor
Jim Henderson	Unaligned	
James Hooke	Unaligned	
Tony Tersteeg	Independent	
Katheryn Smith	Independent	
