= Waukivory =

Waukivory New South Wales
- Coordinates: 32°06′24″S 152°03′04″E
- Population: 108 (SAL 2021)
- Postcode(s): 2422
- Elevation: 202 m (663 ft)
- Location: 16.3 km (10 mi) SE of Gloucester; 48.2 km (30 mi) SW of Taree; 102.3 km (64 mi) NW of Newcastle; 216.9 km (135 mi) NW of Sydney
- LGA(s): Mid-North Coast
- Region: Mid-North Coast
Suburbs around Waukivory:
Gloucester	Mograni	Wallanbah
Forbesdale	Waukivory	Bucca Wauka
Craven	Terreel	Wurranulla

Waukivory is a small town near Gloucester, New South Wales. In 2021 census, there were 94 people living in Waukivory.

== History ==
The first European settlers arrived somewhere around 1840–1850. A school opened there in 1897, but closed in 1960. A community hall was opened in 1947.
