= Pomaderris precaria =

Scientific classification
- Kingdom: Plantae
- Clade: Embryophytes
- Clade: Tracheophytes
- Clade: Spermatophytes
- Clade: Angiosperms
- Clade: Eudicots
- Clade: Rosids
- Order: Rosales
- Family: Rhamnaceae
- Genus: Pomaderris
- Species: P. precaria

Binomial name
- Pomaderris precaria N.G.Walsh & Coates

Species of plant

Pomaderris precaria is a species of flowering plant in the family Rhamnaceae and is endemic to New South Wales. It is a slender shrub with hairy new growth, elliptic to lance-shaped leaves with the narrower end towards the base, and panicles of cream-coloured flowers.

== Description ==
Pomaderris precaria is a slender shrub that typically grows to a height of 1–3 m (3 ft 3 in – 9 ft 10 in), its new growth densely covered with shaggy, greyish to rust-coloured, simple and star-shaped hairs. The leaves are elliptic to lance-shaped with the narrower end towards the base, 10–45 mm (0.39–1.77 in) long and 8–25 mm (0.31–0.98 in) wide on a petiole 3–9 mm (0.12–0.35 in) long with egg-shaped stipules 3–5 mm (0.12–0.20 in) long at the base, but that fall off as the leaf develops. The upper surface of the leaves is covered with soft, more or less velvety hairs and the lower surface is covered with woolly, yellowish to whitish hairs. The flowers are borne in dense panicles 20–80 mm (0.79–3.15 in) long with 50 to 200 cream-coloured flowers densely covered with simple and star-shaped hairs. The sepals are 1.8–2.7 mm (0.071–0.106 in) long, the petals spatula-shaped and 1.2–2.2 mm (0.047–0.087 in) long. Flowering occurs in September and October and the fruit is blackish, oval or elliptic, and 4–5 mm (0.16–0.20 in) long.

== Taxonomy ==
Pomaderris precaria was first formally described in 1997 by Neville Grant Walsh and Fiona Coates in the journal Muelleria from specimens Walsh collected near the Rylstone-Bylong road in 1994. The specific epithet (precaria) means "precarious", referring to the roadside distribution of the type population.

== Distribution and habitat ==
This pomaderris grows in shrubland or woodland in rocky places at altitudes between 700 and 900 m (2,300 and 3,000 ft), mainly in the Rylstone-Bylong area, but also at Mount Gundangaroo near Glen Davis.
