= Growee River =

Coordinates: 31°58′59″S 151°00′47″E

Growee River Growee Creek

Location
- Country: Australia
- State: New South Wales
- Region: NSW South Western Slopes (IBRA), Central Tablelands
- Local government area: Mid-Western Regional
- Town: Bylong

Physical characteristics
- Source: Great Dividing Range
  - location: below Hefrons Hole, northeast of Rylstone
  - elevation: 661 m (2,169 ft)
- Mouth: confluence with the Bylong River
  - location: near Bylong
  - elevation: 255 m (837 ft)
- Length: 42 km (26 mi)

Basin features
- River system: Hunter River catchment
- Tributaries
  - left: Ginghi Creek (Growee River), Gulf Creek, Yarramung Creek

Growee River, a perennial river of the Hunter River catchment, is located in the Central Tablelands region of New South Wales, Australia.

== Course and features ==
Growee River rises on the northern slopes of the Great Dividing Range, below Hefrons Hole, northeast of Rylstone and flows generally northwest then north northeast, then north by west then northeast, joined by three minor tributaries before reaching its confluence with the Bylong River near Bylong. The river descends 407 metres (1,335 ft) over its 42 kilometres (26 mi) course.

The Bylong Valley Way crosses the Growee River at multiple points from below Growee Mountain in the south to near the town of Bylong in the north.

== See also ==
- Rivers of New South Wales
- List of rivers of New South Wales (A–K)
- List of rivers of Australia
