= Kerripit River =

Coordinates: 32°00′S 151°42′E

Kerripit River Rawdon Stream

Location
- Country: Australia
- State: New South Wales
- Region: New England Tablelands (IBRA), NSW North Coast, Upper Hunter, Mid North Coast
- Local government area: Mid-Coast Council

Physical characteristics
- Source: Barrington Tops, Great Dividing Range
  - location: below Careys Peak, Barrington Tops National Park
  - elevation: 1,450 m (4,760 ft)
- Mouth: confluence with the Barrington River
  - location: north northwest of Berrico
  - elevation: 212 m (696 ft)
- Length: 35 km (22 mi)

Basin features
- River system: Manning River catchment
- Tributaries
  - right: Tindag Creek, Pipeclay Gully
- National park: Barrington Tops

Kerripit River, a perennial river of the Manning River catchment, is located in the Upper Hunter district of New South Wales, Australia.

== Course and features ==
Kerripit River rises below Careys Peak in the Barrington Tops within the Great Dividing Range, in the Barrington Tops National Park, and flows generally northeast before reaching its confluence with the Barrington River, north northwest of the village of Berrico. The river descends 1,240 metres (4,070 ft) over its 35 kilometres (22 mi) course.

== See also ==
- Rivers of New South Wales
- List of rivers of New South Wales (A–K)
- List of rivers of Australia
