= Jerrabattgulla Creek =

Coordinates: 35°44′S 149°35′E

Jerrabattgulla Creek Oronmear Creek

Location
- Country: Australia
- State: New South Wales
- Region: South East Corner (IBRA), Southern Tablelands
- Local government area: Queanbeyan-Palerang

Physical characteristics
- Source: Gourock Range, Great Dividing Range
  - location: below Tumanmang Mountain
  - elevation: 1,290 m (4,230 ft)
- Mouth: confluence with the Shoalhaven River
  - location: at Togganoggera, east of Captains Flat
  - elevation: 676 m (2,218 ft)
- Length: 35 km (22 mi)

Basin features
- River system: Shoalhaven River catchment
- Tributaries
  - left: Bush Paddock Creek
- National park: Deua NP

Jerrabattgulla Creek, a perennial stream of the Shoalhaven River catchment, is located in the Southern Tablelands region of New South Wales, Australia.

== Course and features ==
Jerrabattgulla Creek rises below Tumanmang Mountain, about 4 kilometres (2.5 mi) east of the village of Anembo, on the eastern slopes of the Gourock Range, part of the Great Dividing Range. The river flows generally southeast and then north northeast, joined by one minor tributary before reaching its confluence with the Shoalhaven River near Togganoggera, east of Captains Flat. The river descends 617 metres (2,024 ft) over its 35 kilometres (22 mi) course.

== See also ==
- Rivers of New South Wales
- List of rivers of New South Wales (A-K)
- List of rivers of Australia
