= List of rivers of New South Wales (A–K) =

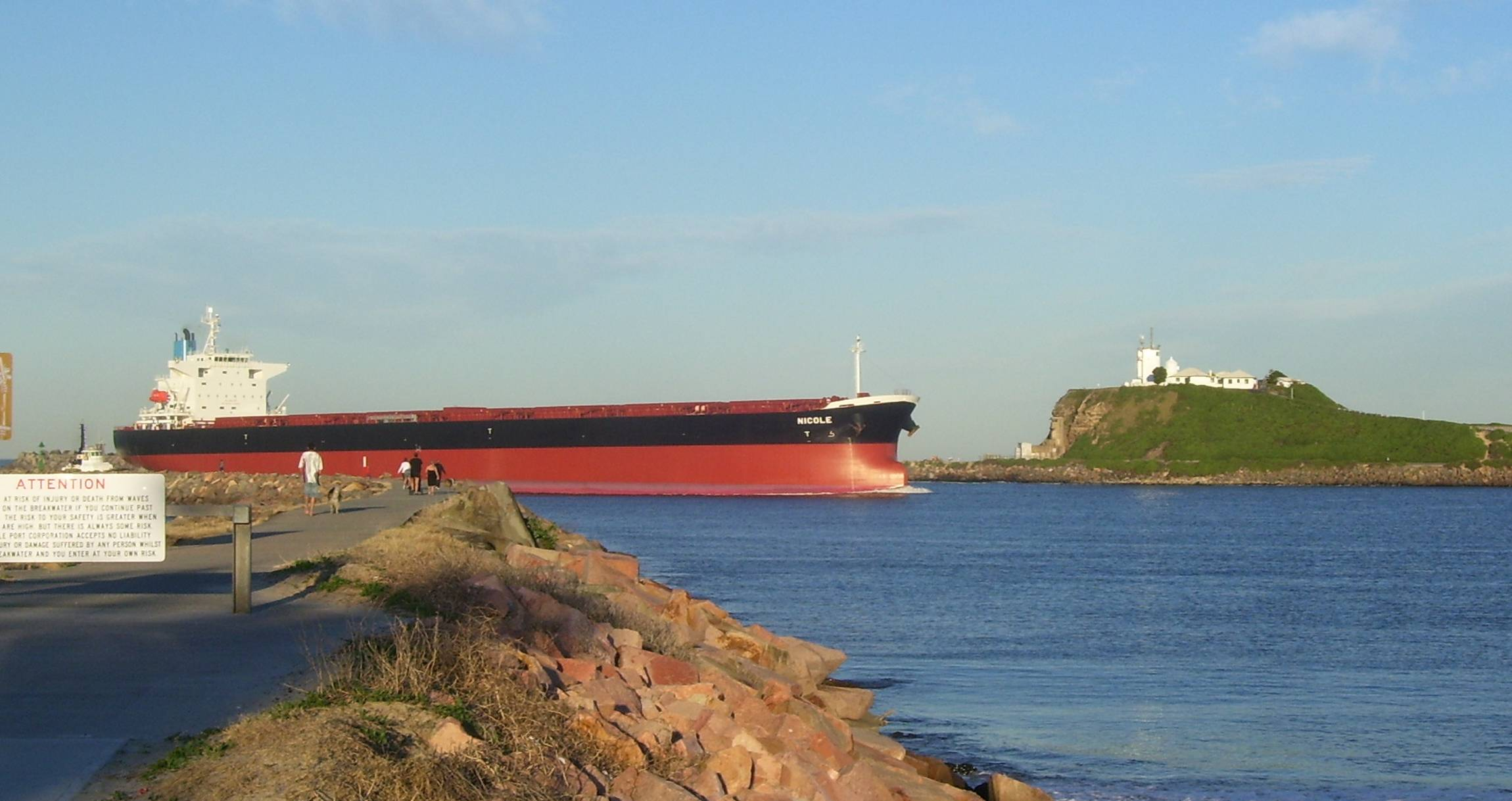
Ship entering the mouth of the Hunter River at Newcastle

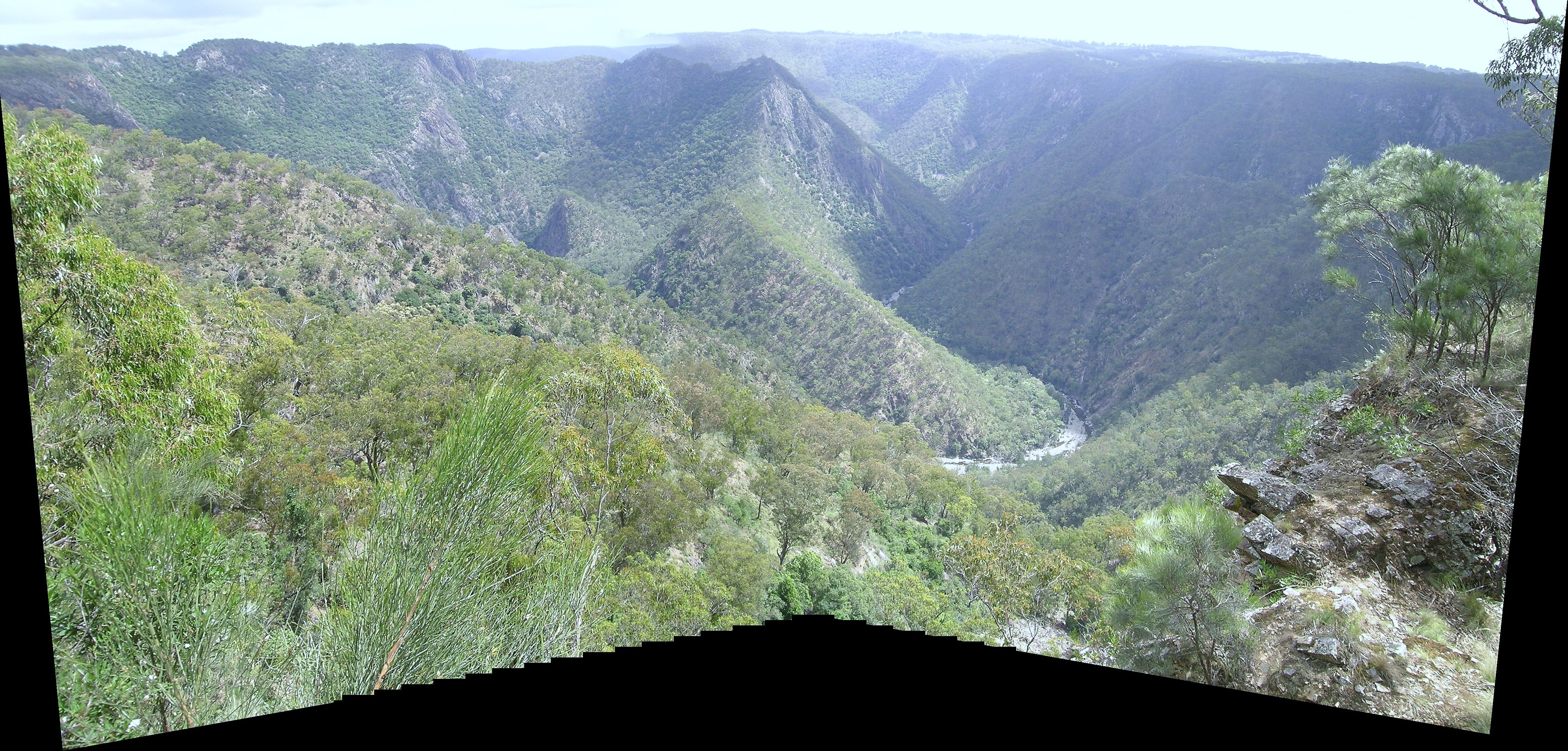
Chandler River

This is the first part of a list of rivers of New South Wales, Australia. With List of rivers of New South Wales (L–Z) it includes all 439 rivers, as of 7 June 2008, listed by the Geographical Names Board of New South Wales in the Geographical Names Register (GNR) of NSW.

River name	Previous names	Source LGA	Source location
Abercrombie		Upper Lachlan	34°00′54″S 149°25′04″E
Aberfoyle	Balblair Creek	Guyra	30°14′54″S 152°00′04″E
Abington Creek	Back Green; Sutton Gully	Uralla	30°18′54″S 151°20′04″E
Adelong Creek		Gundagai	35°22′54″S 148°02′04″E
Adjungbilly Creek		Gundagai	35°04′54″S 148°22′04″E
Allyn		Dungog	32°05′54″S 151°26′04″E
Apsley		Walcha	31°09′54″S 151°50′04″E
Araluen Creek	The Deep Creek	Palerang	35°39′54″S 149°49′04″E
Avon		Wollongong	34°25′54″S 150°40′04″E
Avon		Mid-Coast Council	31°59′54″S 151°58′17″E
Back Creek		Richmond Valley	28°32′54″S 153°04′04″E
Back		Cooma-Monaro	36°19′54″S 149°32′04″E
Back	Barnard Gully; Back Creek	Tamworth Regional	31°29′24″S 151°15′34″E
Baerami Creek	Left Branch of Baerami Ck (Portion)	Muswellbrook	32°29′54″S 150°28′04″E
Bakers Creek		Uralla	30°20′54″S 150°59′04″E
Balgalal Creek	Bangalal Creek; Bungalal Creek; Sheep Station Creek	Yass Valley	34°40′54″S 148°37′04″E
Barcoongere	South Arm Wooli Wooli River; Little River; Wooli River*	Clarence Valley	29°53′54″S 153°12′04″E
Bargo		Wingecarribee	34°14′54″S 150°34′04″E
Barigan Creek		Mid-Western Regional	32°34′00″S 150°01′24″E
Barmedman Creek	Mandamah Creek; Back Creek (R) *	Temora	34°09′54″S 147°26′04″E
Barnard		Gloucester	31°45′54″S 151°54′04″E
Barrington		Gloucester	31°57′54″S 151°45′04″E
Barwon	Darling River (Part); Upper Darling River	Moree Plains	29°29′54″S 146°20′04″E
Beardy	Glen Creek R; Robertsons Creek R; Washpool Creek Nr.; Beardy River Or Glen Creek R	Glen Innes Severn	29°18′54″S 151°30′04″E
Beardy Waters	Maybole Creek; The Beardy Water; Beardy River; The Beardy Waters	Glen Innes Severn	29°36′54″S 151°46′04″E
Beaury Creek		Tenterfield	28°27′54″S 152°30′04″E
Bedford Creek		Blue Mountains	33°46′54″S 150°29′04″E
Bega	Buckajo River; Bemboka River	Bega Valley	36°41′54″S 149°52′04″E
Bell	Nandillion Ponds; Nandillion Ponds River (Nr); Nandillion Ponds Creek (R)	Cabonne	33°06′54″S 149°00′04″E
Bellinger	North Arm Bellingen River; North Arm Bellinger River	Bellingen	30°25′54″S 152°46′04″E
Belubula	King Plains Creek; Dungeon Creek: Camping Ground (R) *	Blayney	33°33′54″S 149°00′04″E
Bemboka		Bega Valley	36°40′54″S 149°28′04″E
Bendoc	Bendock River	Bombala	37°11′54″S 149°41′04″E
Bermagui		Bega Valley	36°24′54″S 150°01′04″E
Berthong Creek	Yannawah Creek	Cootamundra	34°24′54″S 148°00′04″E
Bettowynd Creek		Palerang	35°41′54″S 149°48′04″E
Bielsdown	Bielsdown Creek	Bellingen	30°18′54″S 152°42′04″E
Big Badja	Badja River	Cooma-Monaro	36°06′54″S 149°30′04″E
Billabong Creek	Billabung Creek	Junee	34°54′54″S 147°48′04″E
Bimberamala	Bimberamala Creek	Shoalhaven	35°30′54″S 150°07′04″E
Birrie	Birree River	Brewarrina	29°13′54″S 147°12′04″E
Blackwater Creek		Muswellbrook	32°44′54″S 150°28′04″E
Blakney Creek	Head of Blakney Creek	Upper Lachlan	34°41′54″S 148°59′04″E
Bland Creek	Yeo Yeo Creek	Temora	34°09′54″S 147°40′04″E
Blicks	Main Water Creek	Clarence Valley	30°12′54″S 152°36′04″E
Blue Mountain Creek		Armidale Dumaresq	30°46′54″S 151°49′04″E
Bluff		Tenterfield	29°14′54″S 152°16′04″E
Bobin Creek		Greater Taree	31°41′54″S 152°16′04″E
Bobo	Bobo Creek	Coffs Harbour	30°14′54″S 152°51′04″E
Bogan	New Years Creek	Parkes	33°00′24″S 148°02′04″E
Bokhara		Brewarrina	29°03′54″S 147°30′04″E
Bolong		Upper Lachlan	34°10′54″S 149°37′04″E
Bombala		Cooma-Monaro	36°44′54″S 149°15′04″E
Boomi		Moree Plains	29°02′54″S 149°03′04″E
Boonoo Boonoo		Tenterfield	28°37′54″S 152°15′04″E
Boorowa		Boorowa	34°22′54″S 148°47′04″E
Boundary Creek		Clarence Valley	31°02′54″S 152°35′04″E
Boundary Creek		Clarence Valley	30°15′54″S 152°30′04″E
Bow	Bow Creek	Upper Hunter	32°11′54″S 150°13′04″E
Bowman		Gloucester	31°55′54″S 151°52′04″E
Bowning Creek		Yass Valley	34°43′54″S 148°49′04″E
Boyd	Little River	Clarence Valley	29°51′54″S 152°30′04″E
Bredbo		Cooma-Monaro	35°58′54″S 149°20′04″E
Brogo	Broga River	Bega Valley	36°38′54″S 149°53′04″E
Brunswick	Middle or Main Arm of Brunswick Ri	Byron	28°29′54″S 153°25′04″E
Buckenbowra		Eurobodalla	35°38′54″S 149°59′04″E
Bulla Creek	Bullock Creek	Young	34°06′54″S 148°19′04″E
Bundock Creek	Middle Creek	Narrabri	30°14′54″S 149°30′04″E
Bunnoo		Port Macquarie-Hastings	31°32′54″S 152°27′04″E
Burke	Wombat Creek	Wingecarribee	34°26′54″S 150°35′04″E
Burkes Creek	Pulletop Creek; Burnetts River	Wagga Wagga	35°24′54″S 147°22′04″E
Burns Creek		Walcha	31°21′54″S 151°53′04″E
Burra Creek		Palerang	35°34′54″S 149°14′04″E
Burra Creek		Gundagai	34°51′54″S 148°03′04″E
Burrungubugge River		Snowy River	36°12′54″S 148°27′04″E
Bylong	Bylong Creek	Mid-Western Regional	32°25′54″S 150°08′04″E
Cadiangullong Creek	Oaky Creek	Cabonne	33°22′54″S 149°00′04″E
Camden Haven	Camden Haven River Southern Branch	Greater Taree	31°38′54″S 152°30′04″E
Campbells	Campbell River.	Oberon	33°44′54″S 149°34′04″E
Caparra Creek	Western Branch Dingo Creek	Greater Taree	31°44′54″S 152°13′04″E
Capertee	Bogee River	Lithgow	33°04′54″S 150°12′04″E
Carole Creek	Carore Creek; Medgun Creek; Millie Creek	Moree Plains	29°14′54″S 149°40′04″E
Castlereagh		Warrumbungle	31°17′25″S 149°04′20″E
Cataract	Swamp Oak Creek	Tenterfield	29°04′54″S 152°07′04″E
Cataract		Wollondilly	34°14′54″S 150°47′04″E
Cattle Creek	Eastern Brook	Upper Hunter	31°51′54″S 150°06′04″E
Cedar Creek		Cessnock	32°51′54″S 151°12′04″E
Cedar Party Creek	Pahpoo Creek	Greater Taree	31°44′54″S 152°22′04″E
Cells		Walcha	31°25′54″S 152°04′04″E
Chandler		Armidale Dumaresq	30°37′00″S 152°00′00″E
Chandlers Creek		Clarence Valley	30°01′54″S 152°33′04″E
Cheshire Creek	Jesse Creek	Bathurst Regional	33°14′54″S 149°41′04″E
Chichester		Dungog	32°10′54″S 151°36′04″E
Christmas Creek		Kempsey	30°59′54″S 152°45′04″E
Clarence	Big River	Kyogle	29°29′54″S 152°40′04″E
Clouds Creek		Clarence Valley	30°05′54″S 152°39′04″E
Clyde		Shoalhaven	35°24′54″S 150°14′04″E
Cobark	Hole Creek; Cobakh River; Arundel River	Gloucester	31°55′54″S 151°36′04″E
Cobrabald	Cobrabald Creek.; St. Leonards Creek (Part)	Walcha	31°09′54″S 151°34′04″E
Cockburn		Tamworth Regional	30°59′54″S 151°14′04″E
Coldstream		Clarence Valley	29°43′54″S 153°05′04″E
Colo		Hawkesbury	33°20′54″S 150°40′04″E; 33°14′54″S 150°32′04″E
Commissioners Waters		Armidale Dumaresq	30°33′54″S 151°45′04″E
Congewai Creek	North Arm of Wollombi Brook; Coongewai Creek (R); * Coongeewa Creek	Cessnock	32°55′54″S 151°16′04″E
Connollys Creek		Greater Taree	31°50′54″S 152°08′34″E
Cooba Bulga Stream		Upper Hunter	31°56′54″S 150°02′04″E
Cooks River		Rockdale	33°54′54″S 151°08′04″E
Cooks Vale Creek		Upper Lachlan	34°08′54″S 149°29′04″E
Coolaburragundy River	Coolah Creek	Warrumbungle	31°51′54″S 149°44′04″E
Coolibah Watercourse	Coolibar Watercourse; Swampy Watercourse	Walgett	30°09′54″S 148°31′04″E
Coolongolook	Gooloongolok River	Great Lakes	32°14′54″S 152°20′04″E
Coolumbooka		Bombala	36°51′54″S 149°25′04″E
Cooma Back Creek		Snowy River	36°19′54″S 149°04′04″E
Cooma Creek		Cooma-Monaro	36°24′54″S 149°08′04″E
Coopers Creek		Lismore	28°39′54″S 153°25′04″E
Cooplacurripa		Walcha	31°23′54″S 151°45′04″E
Coorongooba Creek		Lithgow	32°59′54″S 150°20′04″E
Corang		Palerang	35°12′54″S 150°04′04″E
Cordeaux		Wollongong	34°19′54″S 150°43′04″E
Corindi	Redbank River; Corindi Creek *	Clarence Valley	30°01′54″S 153°08′04″E
Cowriga Creek	Conibul Creek; Browns Creek	Blayney	33°26′54″S 149°09′04″E
Coxs		Blue Mountains	33°44′54″S 150°11′04″E
Crawford		Great Lakes	32°22′54″S 152°06′04″E
Crookwell		Upper Lachlan	34°19′54″S 149°15′04″E
Crudine	The Crudine River; Cunninghams Creek; Crudine Creek	Bathurst Regional	32°59′54″S 149°38′34″E
Cudgegong	Mudgee River	Mid-Western Regional	32°46′54″S 149°50′04″E
Culgoa		Brewarrina	29°03′54″S 147°06′04″E
Cullinga Creek		Cootamundra	34°40′54″S 148°08′04″E
Cunningham Creek	Connaughtmans Creek	Harden	34°39′54″S 148°23′04″E
Curricabark	Curricabark Creek	Gloucester	31°44′54″S 151°36′04″E
Darling	Barwon; Karaula; Watta or Calewatta River	Bourke	29°57′27″S 146°18′43″E
Dawson	Dawsons River; Brimbin Creek	Greater Taree	31°52′54″S 152°30′04″E
Deepwater		Glen Innes Severn	30°28′54″S 152°02′04″E
Delegate	Delegete River	Bombala	36°54′54″S 149°02′04″E
Derringullen Creek		Yass Valley	34°43′54″S 148°53′04″E
Deua	Moruya River	Eurobodalla	35°44′54″S 149°47′04″E
Dilgry		Gloucester	31°52′54″S 151°35′04″E
Dingo Creek	Eastern Branch Dingo Creek	Greater Taree	31°39′54″S 152°19′04″E
Doubtful Creek	Doubtful River	Tumbarumba	36°05′54″S 148°26′04″E
Doyles	Big Hill Creek	Port Macquarie-Hastings	31°29′54″S 152°15′04″E
Dry	Murrah River (Gn)	Bega Valley	36°29′54″S 149°55′04″E
Du Faur Creek		Lithgow	33°29′54″S 150°21′04″E
Duckmaloi	Duckmaloi or Fish River	Oberon	33°46′54″S 149°55′04″E
Dumaresq	Dumaresq or Severn River	Inverell	28°59′54″S 151°15′04″E
Dungowan Creek	Ogunbil Creek	Tamworth Regional	31°25′24″S 151°20′04″E
Dyke		Armidale Dumaresq	30°39′54″S 152°17′04″E
Eden Creek		Kyogle	28°39′54″S 152°55′04″E
Edward		Murray	35°33′54″S 145°00′04″E
Ellenborough		Port Macquarie-Hastings	31°29′54″S 152°25′04″E
Emu Swamp Creek	Black Spring Creek	Cabonne	33°17′54″S 149°13′04″E
Endrick	Bulee River; Main Creek	Shoalhaven	35°05′54″S 150°07′04″E
Erskine Creek		Blue Mountains	33°51′54″S 150°30′04″E
Esk	Fresh Water River	Richmond Valley	29°14′54″S 153°17′04″E
Eucumbene	Kiandra Creek	Snowy River	35°59′54″S 148°39′04″E
Evans Plains Creek	Princess Charlotte Ponds; Fitzgerald Creek (R); Reedy Creek (C); Princess Charlotte Valley	Bathurst Regional	33°25′54″S 149°30′04″E
Evans		Richmond Valley	29°07′54″S 153°24′04″E
Ewenmar Creek		Narromine	32°01′54″S 148°23′04″E
Felled Timber Creek		Oberon	34°01′54″S 149°44′04″E
Fish	Fish River Creek; Fish River Creek (West Branch)	Oberon	33°44′54″S 149°50′04″E
Flyers Creek	Errowanbang Creek; Mummur Creek *; Errowinbang	Cabonne	33°27′54″S 149°03′04″E
Forbes		Port Macquarie-Hastings	31°19′54″S 152°19′04″E
Frazers Creek	Swamp Oak Creek; Frazers or Swamp Oak Creek; Spring Creek	Inverell	29°40′54″S 151°20′04″E
Gara	Gyra River; Ryanda Creek; Falconer Creek; Malpas Creek	Armidale Dumaresq	30°38′24″S 151°49′44″E
Geehi	Swampy Plain River; Rocky Plain Creek	Tumbarumba	36°16′54″S 148°18′04″E
Genoa	Bondi Creek; Yard Creek *	Bombala	37°15′54″S 149°21′04″E
Georges Creek	Georges River; Upper Georges Creek	Armidale Dumaresq	30°39′54″S 152°13′04″E
Georges	Tucoerah River	Sutherland Shire	33°59′54″S 151°05′54″E
Glen Fernaigh	Glen Fernaigh Creek	Clarence Valley	30°14′54″S 152°30′04″E
Gloucester		Gloucester	31°58′34″S 151°58′28″E
Goobarragandra		Tumut	35°25′54″S 148°30′04″E
Goodradigbee	Little River; Murray Creek	Yass Valley	35°14′54″S 148°44′04″E
Goorudee Rivulet	Little River	Snowy River	35°58′54″S 148°45′04″E
Goulburn	Reedy Creek	Mid-Western Regional	32°11′54″S 150°03′04″E
Grose		Hawkesbury	33°34′58″S 150°30′43″E
Growee	Growee Creek	Mid-Western Regional	32°27′54″S 150°05′04″E
Gungarlin		Snowy River	36°09′54″S 148°31′04″E
Gunningbland Creek		Forbes	33°06′54″S 147°47′04″E
Guy Fawkes		Guyra	30°09′54″S 152°19′04″E
Gwydir	Big Bundarra River; Bundara River; Big River; * Rocky River	Uralla	29°59′54″S 151°00′04″E
Hacking		Wollongong	34°08′54″S 151°02′04″E
Halls Creek	Cuerindi River	Tamworth Regional	30°46′54″S 150°57′04″E
Happy Jacks Creek	Happy Jacks River	Tumbarumba	36°00′54″S 148°28′04″E
Hastings	Mooraback Creek	Port Macquarie-Hastings	31°25′54″S 152°22′04″E
Hawkesbury	Deerubbun	Hawkesbury	33°25′54″S 151°02′04″E
Henry	Little Henry River; North Branch of Little Henry River	Clarence Valley	29°50′54″S 152°08′04″E
Hollanders		Oberon	33°53′54″S 150°00′04″E
Horsearm Creek	Horsham Creek	Narrabri	30°23′54″S 150°10′04″E
Horton		Gwydir	30°02′54″S 150°22′04″E
Hunter	Coquon P.T.O.; First Hunter Creek	Upper Hunter	32°29′54″S 150°45′04″E
Imlay Creek		Bega Valley	37°11′54″S 149°41′04″E
Ingeegoodbee		Snowy River	36°44′54″S 148°16′04″E
Isabella		Oberon	33°59′54″S 149°39′04″E
Isis		Upper Hunter	31°54′54″S 151°03′04″E
Jacobs	Tongaroo or Jacobs River.	Snowy River	36°44′54″S 148°26′04″E
Jeir Creek	Oakey Creek	Yass Valley	35°05′54″S 149°05′04″E
Jenolan	Harrys River	Oberon	33°48′54″S 150°06′04″E
Jerra Jerra Creek	Cookardinia Creek	Greater Hume	35°29′54″S 147°13′04″E
Jerrabattgulla Creek	Oronmear Creek	Palerang	35°43′54″S 149°35′04″E
Jerrara Creek	Chain of Ponds Creek	Upper Lachlan	34°27′54″S 149°09′04″E
Jerrawa Creek		Upper Lachlan	34°43′54″S 149°09′04″E
Jooriland	Jooriland Creek (Part); Myanga Valley Creek (Part)	Wollondilly	34°09′54″S 150°14′04″E
Jugiong Creek	Cumbamurra River; Connors Creek; Barbers Creek; Talmo Creek	Harden	34°54′54″S 148°36′04″E
Kalang	South Arm Bellingen River	Bellingen	30°27′54″S 152°50′04″E
Kanangra Creek	Thurat Rivulet (Part); Konangaroo Creek; Kanangra River	Oberon	33°56′54″S 150°09′04″E
Kangaroo	Kangaroo Creek	Clarence Valley	30°03′54″S 152°51′04″E
Kangaroo	Budderoo Creek	Shoalhaven	34°38′54″S 150°41′04″E
Karuah	Karuah River Left Hand Branch	Great Lakes	32°11′54″S 151°45′04″E
Kedumba	Kedumba Creek(Part); Katoomba Creek(Part)	Blue Mountains	33°46′45″S 150°21′27″E
Kerripit	Rawdon Stream	Gloucester	31°59′54″S 151°42′04″E
Kindra Creek		Coolamon	34°44′54″S 147°23′04″E
Kowmung		Oberon	34°03′54″S 150°06′04″E
Krui		Upper Hunter	32°09′54″S 150°06′04″E
Kunderang Brook		Walcha	30°59′54″S 152°13′04″E
Kybeyan		Cooma-Monaro	36°28′54″S 149°27′04″E

== See also ==
- Rivers of New South Wales
- List of rivers of Australia
