= Mildred Muscio =

Australian women's rights activist

Mildred Muscio OBE
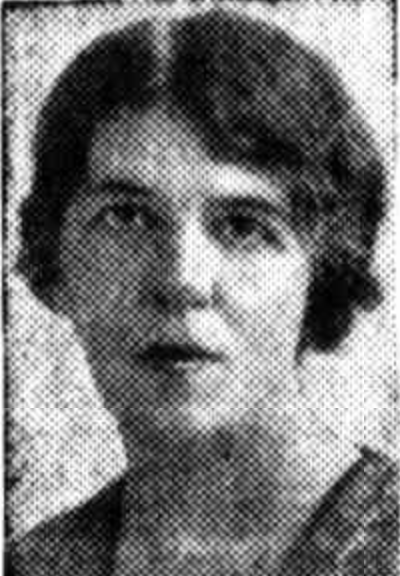
- Muscio in 1940
- Born: Florence Mildred Fry; 28 April 1882; Copeland, New South Wales, Australia
- Died: 17 August 1964 (aged 82); Ryde, New South Wales, Australia
- Education: Sydney Girls' High School; University of Sydney
- Occupations: Women's rights activist, feminist, school principal
- Spouse: Bernard Muscio (m. 1915; died 1926)

Florence Mildred Muscio OBE (28 April 1882 – 17 August 1964) was an Australian activist for the rights of women and children, feminist and school principal.

== Early life and education ==
Muscio was born Florence Mildred Fry on 28 April 1882 at Copeland, a village near Gloucester in the Upper Hunter region of New South Wales. She was the eldest daughter of Charles and Jane (née McLennan) Fry. She completed her secondary education at Sydney Girls' High, where she was head of school in 1897 and won matriculation honours.

She graduated with a BA (Hons) from the University of Sydney in 1901, and was awarded Professor Anderson's prize for logic and mental philosophy. She then undertook an MA in ethics, graduating in 1905 from the same university.

== Career ==
From 1902 to 1912, Muscio was principal of Brighton College at Manly. In 1906 Dunn and Co published a 31-page book by Muscio and her sister Edith Fry titled Poems, which was described by The Sydney Morning Herald as "several pleasing essays in verse".

By February 1912, she and her sister Edith were in London, having sold Brighton College to finance their trip. She was one of two Australian representatives selected by the Teachers' Guild of New South Wales to attend the Imperial Conference of Teachers there. In 1913, she was working as a teacher in a London school.

In August 1920, Muscio and Louisa Macdonald, former principal of the Women's College at the University of Sydney attended the inaugural conference of the International Federation of University Women in London. Back in Sydney in 1922 she acted as honorary secretary of the Better Films League from its inception, an initiative of the National Council of Women of New South Wales, to which she belonged. She was also active in the establishment of the Australian Federation of University Women in the same year. From 1923 to 1926, Muscio was president of the Sydney University Women Graduates' Association.

In September 1927, she was the only woman appointed to the Child Endowment Commission. She was elected president of the National Council of Women, 1927–1929.

She was on the executive of the All for Australia League and spoke to public meetings held by that organisation, during its short existence during 1931. She was involved in the merger of that group into the new United Australia Party. After the merger, she was a supporter of that party, including making a political broadcast on its behalf in 1932.

== Honours and recognition ==
In 1938, Muscio was appointed an Officer of the British Empire (OBE) in recognition of her work as "Chairman, National Council of Women, State of New South Wales, and Chairman of the Women's Executive Committee and Advisory Council for Australia's 150th Anniversary Celebrations".

Muscio Place, in the Canberra suburb of Chisholm, is named in her honour.

== Personal life ==
On 31 March 1915, she married Bernard Muscio, an Australian psychology academic who was studying and working in England. He died of heart disease in 1926 at the age of 39. Muscio died in a Ryde hospital on 17 August 1964. She had no children.
