= Cobark River =

River in New South Wales, Australia

Coordinates: 31°56′S 151°36′E

Cobark River Hole Creek, Cobakh River, Arundel River

Location
- Country: Australia
- State: New South Wales
- IBRA: New England Tablelands, NSW North Coast
- District: Upper Hunter, Mid North Coast
- Local government area: Mid-Coast Council

Physical characteristics
- Source: Barrington Tops, Great Dividing Range
  - location: near Thunderbolts Lookout, Barrington Tops National Park
  - elevation: 745 m (2,444 ft)
- Mouth: confluence with the Barrington River
  - location: near Upper Bowman
  - elevation: 218 m (715 ft)
- Length: 27 km (17 mi)

Basin features
- River system: Manning River catchment
- Tributaries
  - left: Dilgry River
- National park: Barrington Tops

Cobark River, a perennial river of the Manning River catchment, is located in the Upper Hunter district of New South Wales, Australia.

== Course and features ==
Cobark River rises in the Barrington Tops within the Great Dividing Range, near Thunderbolts Lookout in the Barrington Tops National Park, and flows generally east by south, joined by the Dilgry River before reaching its confluence with the Barrington River, south southwest of the village of Upper Bowman. The river descends 526 metres (1,726 ft) over its 27 kilometres (17 mi) course.

== See also ==
- Rivers of New South Wales
- List of rivers of New South Wales (A–K)
- List of rivers of Australia
