= Bucketts Way =

Road in New South Wales, Australia

Bucketts Way New South Wales
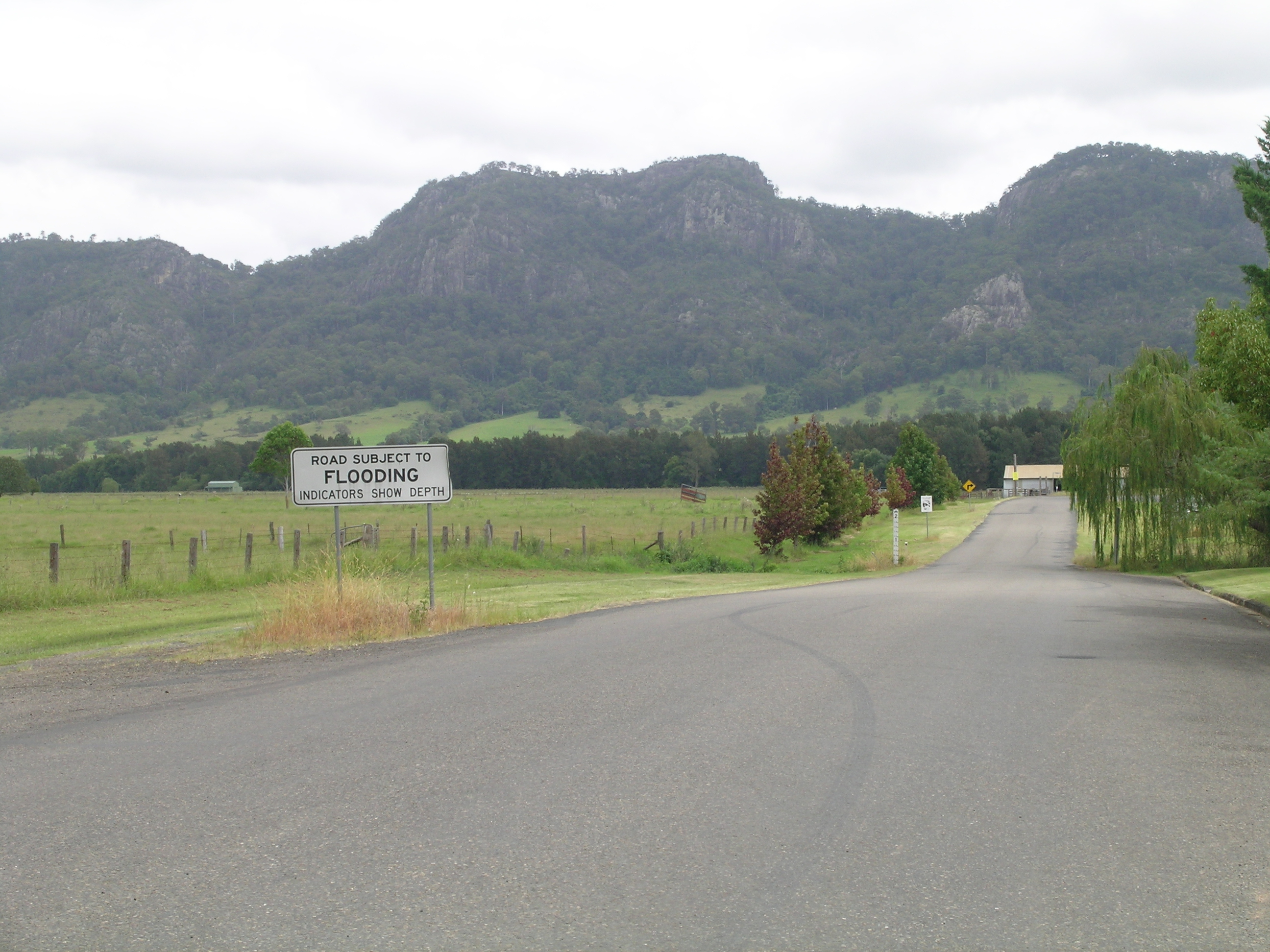
- The Bucketts Range from Bucketts Way
- Coordinates: 31.939287°S 152.467956°E (North end); 32.652664°S 151.866139°E (South end)

General information
- Type: Rural road
- Length: 151 km (94 mi)
- Gazetted: August 1928 (as Main Road 10); July 1952 (as Trunk Road 90)
- Route number(s): Tourist Route 2

Major junctions
- North end: Manning River Drive; Purfleet, New South Wales
- Thunderbolts Way
- South end: Pacific Highway; Twelve Mile Creek, New South Wales

Location(s)
- Major settlements: Tinonee, Gloucester, Stroud

(The) Bucketts Way is a 151-kilometre (94 mi) rural road that links Gloucester to Taree and Raymond Terrace, in New South Wales, Australia. A former alignment of Pacific Highway, it was later named after the Bucketts Mountains, a prominent mountain range near Gloucester. The entire route is designated as Tourist Route 2.

== Route ==
In the south, the Bucketts Way branches off to the west of Pacific Highway at Twelve Mile Creek, 14 km (9 mi) north of the Raymond Terrace bypass. Heading north, it crosses the Karuah River about 8.5 km (5.3 mi) south of Stroud and then roughly follows the course of the Karuah River upstream in a west-north-westerly direction for approximately 25 km (16 mi), crossing the Mammy Johnsons River. It then turns north-north-east and then north for 32 km (20 mi) until it reaches Gloucester, crossing the Avon River on the way. The North Coast railway line runs parallel with it from just north-east of Stroud Road to Gloucester. At Gloucester, Bucketts Way meets the southern terminus of Thunderbolts Way that leads to the Northern Tablelands and various other national parks and riverside camping reserves along the way. The Bucketts Way continues eastwards to Krambach, ending at the intersection with Manning River Drive in Purfleet just south of Taree, close to its interchange with Pacific Highway.

It provides access to the Barrington Tops National Park, and is used by tourists as a very scenic alternative to Pacific Highway. The Bucketts Way travels through two council areas: Port Stephens and Mid-Coast Council.

== History ==
The passing of the Main Roads Act of 1924 through the Parliament of New South Wales provided for the declaration of Main Roads, roads partially funded by the State government through the Main Roads Board (MRB). North Coast Highway was declared (as Main Road No. 10) 8 August 1928 from Twelve Mile Creek to Purfleet (continuing southwards to Hexham, and northwards via Port Macquarie, Coffs Harbour, Ballina, Byron Bay and Murwillumbah to Tweed Heads. With the passing of the Main Roads (Amendment) Act of 1929 to provide for additional declarations of State Highways and Trunk Roads, this was amended to State Highway 10 on 8 April 1929. North Coast Highway was renamed Pacific Highway (and extended south to North Sydney) on 26 May 1931.

A new alignment of Pacific Highway was constructed between Twelve Mile Creek via Karuah, Bulahdelah and Nabiac to Purfleet; as a result, the former alignment via Stroud and Gloucester was re-declared as Trunk Road 90 on 30 July 1952. Trunk Road 90 was officially named The Bucketts Way on 18 October 1972.

The passing of the Roads Act of 1993 through the Parliament of New South Wales updated road classifications and the way they could be declared within New South Wales. Under this act, the northern end of Main Road 90 (formerly Trunk Road 90) was re-aligned from Krambach via Dyers Crossing to end at the intersection with Pacific Highway in Nabiac on 22 November 1996; the southern end of Main Road 192 was extended to cover the former alignment between Burrell Creek and Krambach (and continuing north via Wingham to Taree), with the road from Burrell Creek via Tinonee and Purfleet currently undeclared. Bucketts Way today, as parts of Main Roads 90 and 192, still retain these declarations.

Some councillors of the former Gloucester Shire had proposed renaming the section of Bucketts Way south of Gloucester to Thunderbolts Way in December 2004, as is shown on some tourist maps. This would result in one continuously named road stretching from Pacific Highway near Raymond Terrace to New England Highway at Uralla and beyond. However, there was significant community opposition to a name change.

== Major junctions ==
LGA	Location	km	mi	Destinations	Notes
Mid-Coast	Purfleet	0.0	0.0	Manning River Drive – Taree, Wingham to Pacific Highway (A1) – Port Macquarie, Raymond Terrace, Newcastle, Sydney	Northern terminus of Bucketts Way and Tourist Route 2 at roundabout
Mid-Coast	Burrell Creek	17.9	11.1	Gloucester Road – Wingham, Taree	
Mid-Coast	Krambach	34.0	21.1	Mill Street, to Avalon Road – Nabiac	
Mid-Coast	Gangat	56.8	35.3	Wallanbah Road – Wallanbah, Bucca Wauka	
Avon River		69.0	42.9	Bridge over the river (Bridge name unknown)	
Gloucester	Gloucester	69.8	43.4	North Coast railway line	
Gloucester	Gloucester	70.6	43.9	Thunderbolts Way – Walcha, Uralla, Inverell	Roundabout
Gloucester	Gloucester	74.0	46.0	Jacks Road, to Waukivory Road – Upper Mayall, Bulahdelah	
Gloucester	Gloucester	80.1	49.8	Gloucester Tops Road – Barrington Tops National Park	
Avon River		83.6	51.9	Bridge over the river (Bridge name unknown)	
Mid-Coast	Stroud Road	111.8	69.5	North Coast railway line	
Mammy Johnsons River		112.5	69.9	Bridge over the river (Bridge name unknown)	
Mid-Coast	Stroud	116.2	72.2	Stroud Hill Road – Dungog	
Mid-Coast	Booral	127.1	79.0	Booral Road – Bulahdelah	
Karuah River		128.3	79.7	Bridge over the river (Bridge name unknown)	
Mid-Coast	Limeburners Creek	135.3	84.1	Limeburners Creek Road – Clarence Town	
Port Stephens	Twelve Mile Creek	150.6	93.6	Pacific Highway (A1) – Port Macquarie, Raymond Terrace, Newcastle, Sydney	Southern terminus of Bucketts Way and Tourist Route 2
1.000 mi = 1.609 km; 1.000 km = 0.621 mi: Route transition

== See also ==
- Highways in Australia
- List of highways in New South Wales
