= Dilgry River =

River in New South Wales, Australia

Coordinates: 31°56′S 151°40′E

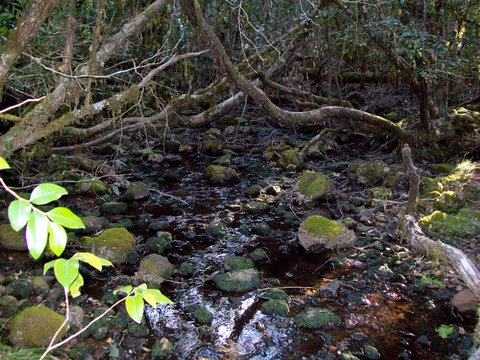
- Dilgry River, with Antarctic beech, at elevation 1,420 metres (4,660 ft)

Location
- Country: Australia
- State: New South Wales
- Region: New England Tablelands (IBRA), NSW North Coast, Upper Hunter, Mid North Coast
- Local government area: Mid-Coast Council

Physical characteristics
- Source: Mount Royal Range, Barrington Tops, Great Dividing Range
  - location: near Tunderbolts Lookout, Barrington Tops National Park
  - elevation: 1,440 m (4,720 ft)
- Mouth: confluence with the Cobark River
  - location: near Boranel Mountain
  - elevation: 339 m (1,112 ft)
- Length: 27 km (17 mi)

Basin features
- River system: Manning River catchment
- National park: Barrington Tops

Cobark River, a perennial river of the Manning River catchment, is located in the Upper Hunter district of New South Wales, Australia.

== Course and features ==
Dilgry River rises in the Barrington Tops within the Great Dividing Range, near Tunderbolts Lookout in the Barrington Tops National Park, and flows generally east then south by east, before reaching its confluence with the Cobark River, north north east of Boranel Mountain. The river descends 1,100 metres (3,600 ft) over its 26 kilometres (16 mi) course.

== See also ==
- Rivers of New South Wales
- List of rivers of New South Wales (A–K)
- List of rivers of Australia
