= Barrington, New South Wales =

Barrington New South Wales
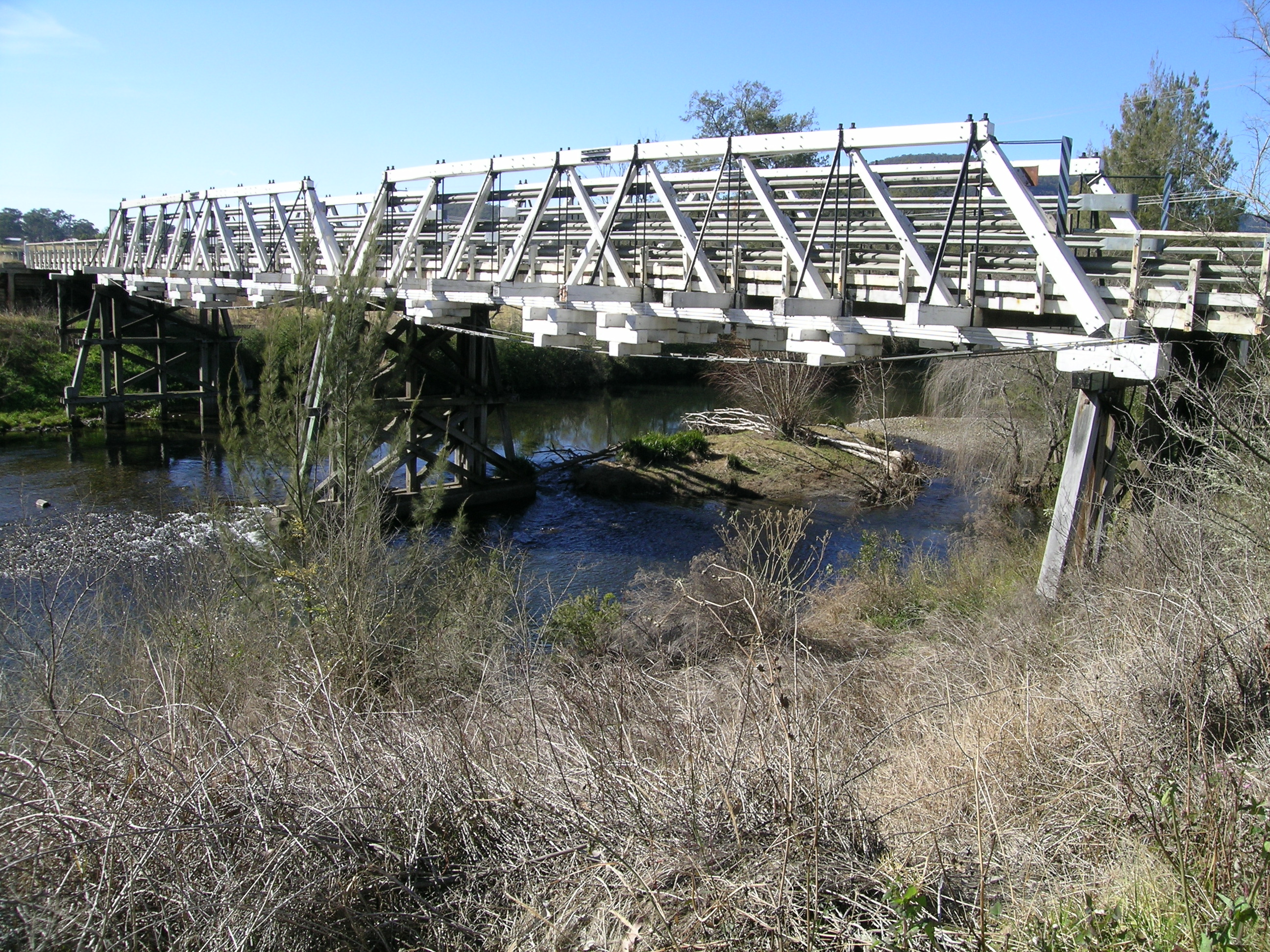
- The bridge over the Barrington River, Thunderbolts Way, Barrington

- Coordinates: 31°58′54″S 151°54′04″E
- Population: 394 (SAL 2021)
- LGA(s): MidCoast Council
- State electorate(s): Upper Hunter
- Federal division(s): Lyne

Barrington is a small village on the Barrington River, 5 kilometres (3.1 mi) north-west of Gloucester, New South Wales, Australia on Thunderbolts Way.

The small town is considered a main gateway to the Barrington Tops National Park. Its population in 361 and until 2016 was the main tourist attraction in the Gloucester Shire. The town is also home to a range of heritage structures including the historic Barrington River Bridge, Barrington River Cottage, the pioneer cemetery, and the Barrington Public School (c. 1910).
