= Goorudee Rivulet =

Coordinates: 35°59′S 148°45′E

Goorudee Little River, Rocky Plain Creek

Location
- Country: Australia
- State: New South Wales
- Region: Australian Alps (IBRA), Snowy Mountains
- Local government area: Snowy Monaro Regional Council

Physical characteristics
- Source: Monaro Range
  - location: below Bulgar Hill
  - elevation: 1,180 m (3,870 ft)
- Mouth: confluence with the Murrumbidgee River
  - location: near Adaminaby
  - elevation: 967 m (3,173 ft)
- Length: 23 km (14 mi)

Basin features
- River system: Murrumbidgee catchment, Murray–Darling basin

The Goorudee Rivulet, a perennial river of the Murrumbidgee catchment of the Murray–Darling basin, is located in the Snowy Mountains region of New South Wales, Australia.

== Course and features ==
The Goorudee Rivulet rises below Bulgar Hill, part of Monaro Range, adjacent to the Snowy Mountains Highway, and flows generally east southeast before reaching its confluence with the Murrumbidgee River, north of Adaminaby. The river descends 212 metres (696 ft) over its 23-kilometre (14 mi) course.

== See also ==
- List of rivers of New South Wales (A–K)
- List of rivers of Australia
- Rivers of New South Wales
