= Gilgai, New South Wales =

Gilgai
- Town
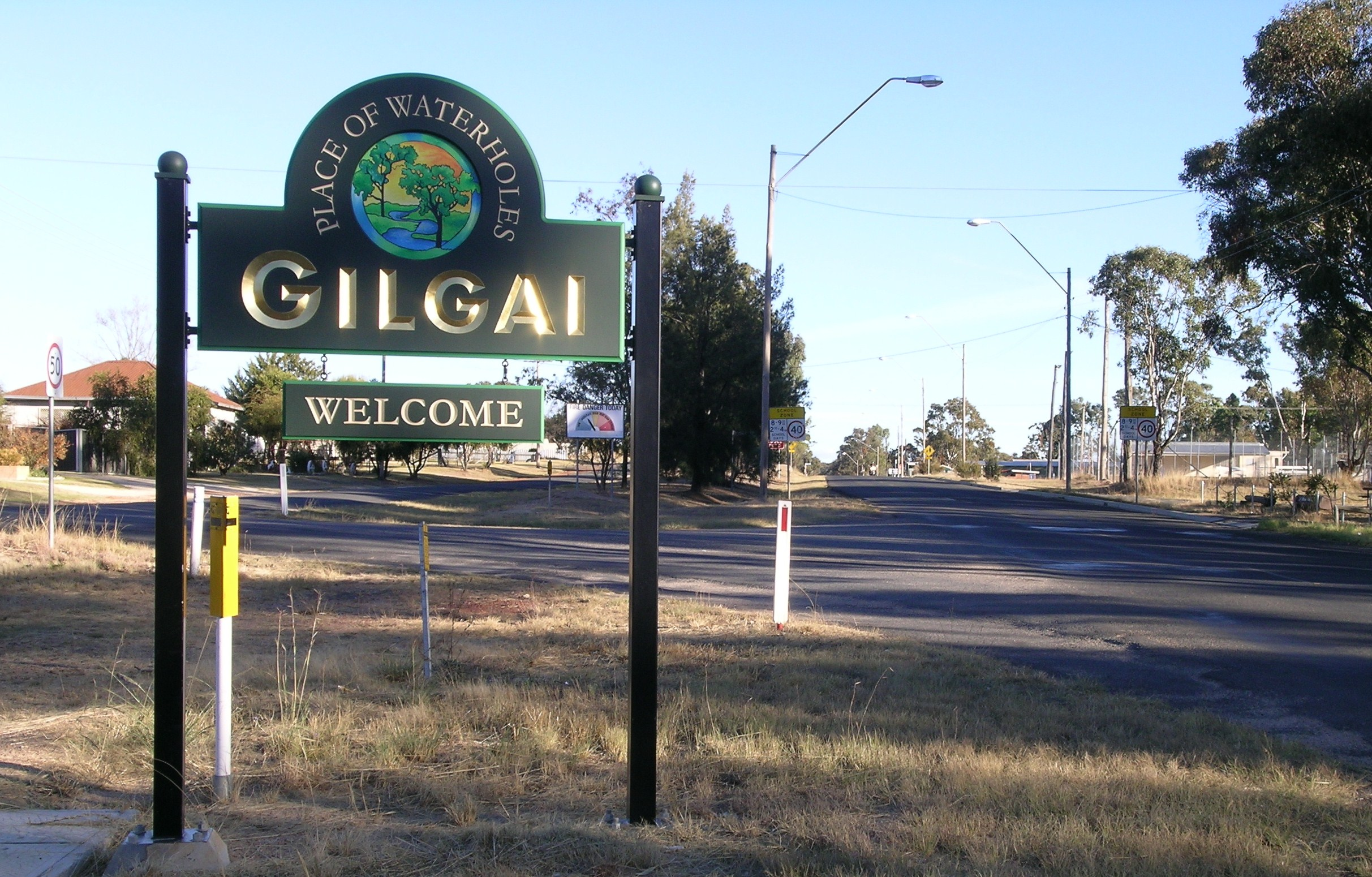
- Thunderbolts Way

- Coordinates: 29°51′0″S 151°7′12″E
- Country: Australia
- State: New South Wales
- LGA: Inverell Shire
- Location: 10 km (6.2 mi) S of Inverell

Government
  - State electorate: Northern Tablelands
  - Federal division: New England

Population
  - Total: 289 (2006 census)
- Postcode: 2360

Gilgai is a town in the Northern Tablelands region of New South Wales, Australia. The village is situated 10 km south of Inverell, New South Wales, on Thunderbolts Way, and is in Inverell Shire. At the 2006 census, Gilgai had a population of 289 people. The name "gilgai" is an Aboriginal word meaning 'waterhole'.

The area around Gilgai is dotted with mine shafts that are unique in Australia. They are known as 'concertina shafts' because the seams of tin bearing ore were in a zigzag pattern and were mined accordingly. The precious stones found here include sapphires, rubies, and some diamonds.

Wine grapes were first grown here in 1849 by Charles Wyndham and re-introduced in 1968. Agriculture is the main industry in the area, with beef cattle production and wine being the main products. Gilgai has a public school which was built in 1878 from bricks baked on-site. There is also a general store, rural supplies store, Anglican Church, Salvation Army Church, community hall and tennis complex. Gilgai Post Office opened on 16 November 1879.
