= Copeland, New South Wales =

Copeland New South Wales
- Coordinates: 31°59′55″S 151°50′5″E
- Population: 306 (2006)
- Postcode(s): 2422
- Location: 19.4 km (12 mi) from Gloucester, New South Wales; 142 km (88 mi) from Newcastle, New South Wales; 281 km (175 mi) from Sydney
- LGA(s): Mid-Coast Council
- State electorate(s): Upper Hunter
- Federal division(s): Lyne
Suburbs around Copeland:
| | Mount Peerless | Cobark |
| Rawdon Vale | Copeland | Barrington |
| | Bindera |

Copeland is a small settlement in the Mid-Coast Council, New South Wales, Australia.

Women's rights activist, Mildred Muscio, was born at Copeland in 1882.

See also:

- Copeland Tops State Conservation Area
