= Avon River (Mid-Coast Council) =

River in the Upper Hunter region of New South Wales, Australia

Coordinates: 31°59′54″S 151°58′17″E

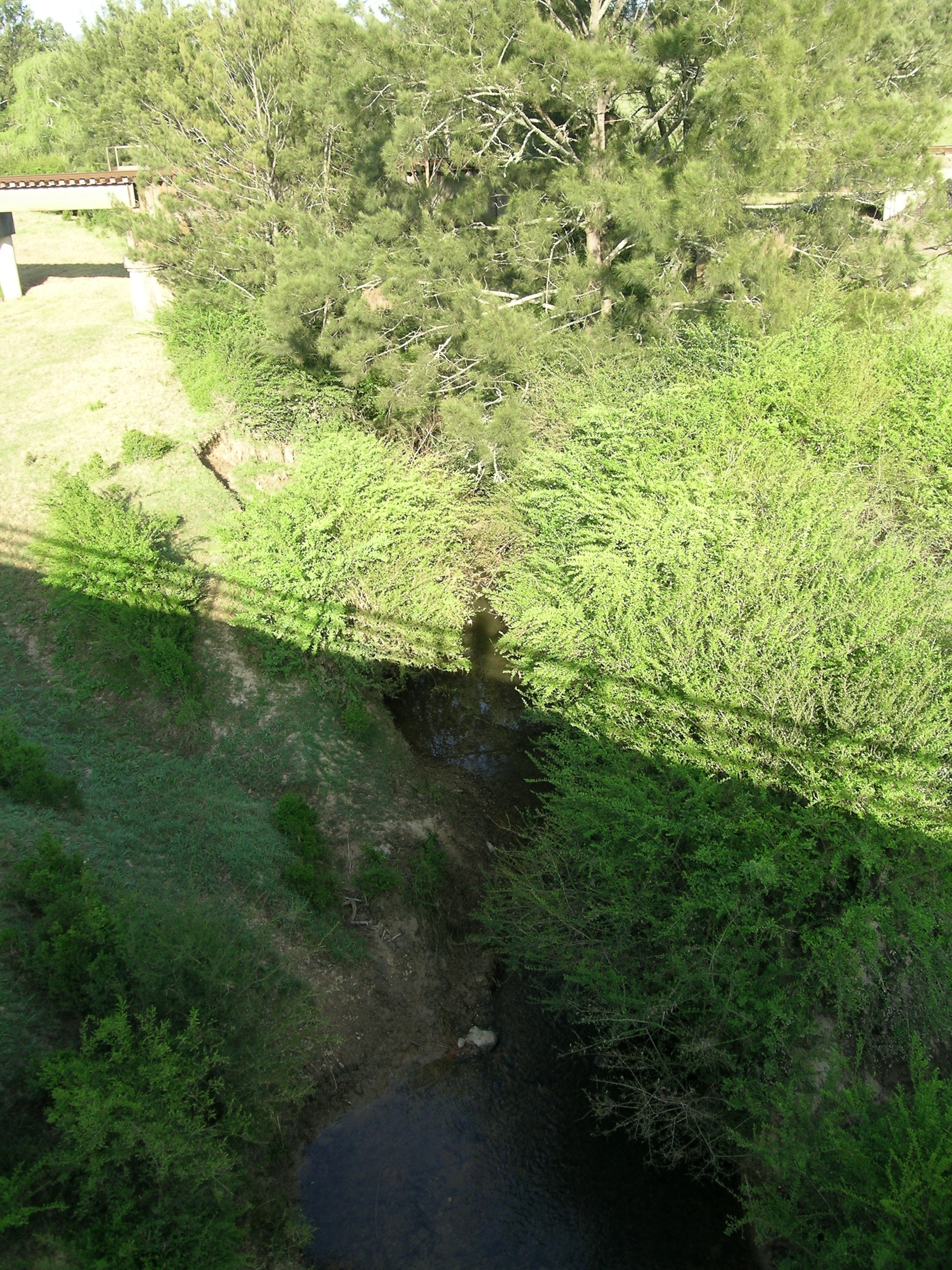
- Avon River at Stratford

- Location of mouth

Location
- Country: Australia
- State: New South Wales
- IBRA: NSW North Coast
- District: Upper Hunter
- Municipality: Mid-Coast Council

Physical characteristics
- Source: Barrington Tops
  - location: south of Carsonville
  - elevation: 498 m (1,634 ft)
- Mouth: confluence with the Gloucester River
  - location: near Gloucester
  - elevation: 86 m (282 ft)
- Length: 42 km (26 mi)

Basin features
- River system: Manning River catchment
- Tributaries
  - right: Clear Hill Creek, Cadiangullong Creek, Dog Trap Creek, Mograni Creek, Waukivory Creek

Avon River, a perennial stream of the Manning River catchment, is located in the Upper Hunter region of New South Wales, Australia.

== Course and features ==
Avon River rises in the northern foothills of the Barrington Tops, south of Carsonville in the Berrico Nature Reserve within the Barrington Tops National Park, and flows generally north-east, joined by five minor tributaries, before reaching its confluence with the Gloucester River, near Gloucester, south of the confluence of the Gloucester River with the Barrington River. The river descends 412 metres (1,352 ft) over its 42 kilometres (26 mi) course

The catchment area of the river benefits from melting snow in spring. Gloucester district, although incredibly hot in the main summer months, nevertheless has an annual rainfall averaging 1,300 millimetres (51 in). As a result, combined with the merging streams and rivers, periodic serious flooding occurs in the Avon Valley at Gloucester, sometimes cutting all transport links.

The Gloucester River eventually flows into the Manning River, a major waterway which flows into the Tasman Sea through a minor delta east of Taree.

In 2004, assessments of water sampling done in 1997 by the NSW Environment Protection Authority, revealed poor water quality, with high levels of nutrients leading to excess algae. Along the river, downstream from Stratford, bank erosion and the invasion by exotic plant species have degraded the river.

== See also ==
- List of rivers of Australia
- List of rivers of New South Wales (A–K)
- Rivers of New South Wales
