= Brighton College, Manly =

Former private girls' school in Manly, New South Wales

Brighton College

Location
- Manly, New South Wales, Australia; 33°47′55″S 151°16′47″E

Information
- Type: Private school
- Motto: Latin: Fortitier et Recte (Bravely and uprightly)
- Established: 1889
- Founder: Miss Ethel Milne
- Status: Closed
- Closed: 1960
- Gender: Girls

Brighton College (also known as Brighton College for Girls) was a non-denominational day and boarding private girls' school in Manly, New South Wales, Australia. It operated from 1889 to 1960 in the suburb of Manly, Australia.

== History ==
Miss Ethel Milne opened a girls' day kindergarten school on Wentworth Street, Manly, in 1880. Brighton College itself was established by Milne in 1889.

In the early years, boys were also pupils in the kindergarten; they were admitted again to the infants' department in the early 1940s. By 1928 there were 222 pupils. By 1946 the school was divided into three schools: kindergarten, middle and upper.

The school moved frequently in its early years: it was located variously at Wood Street, Fairlight Street, and James Street, and for some time it occupied a large cottage on the Ocean Beach called Brighton. It was also briefly located on Pittwater Road (opposite Manly Park) and in North Steyne; when it vacated the last of these the building was then briefly occupied by the Manly Grammar School. A new building was opened in 1905, named 'Vista Reale', and located on the corner of Fairlight Street and The Crescent. In 1912 the then owner of Brighton College, Miss Mildred Fry, sold the school to Miss Maria Hayes-Williams, the Principal of the Manly High School for Girls (also known as Leona School for Girls, and originally Manly College for Girls), which occupied Leona House, also located on The Crescent. In doing so, Hayes-Williams kept the name Brighton College for the combined school, after initially naming it Manly High School for Girls and Brighton College. In 1927 the school moved to what would become its final location, 'Kurrumboola', on the corner of Margaret Street and 38 The Crescent, at the Fairlight end of Manly. Boarders were housed at 5 Margaret Street.

Increased pupil numbers resulted in the establishment of a branch school in 1923, on the eastern side of Manly. The branch school was moved into the main building in 1924. In 1942 the school obtained the former Chief Justice Sir Adrian Knox's country estate, 'Dalkeith', in Gundagai as a country branch.

Physical culture was taught by Hans Christian Bjelke-Petersen. There was a Brighton College Old Girls’ Union, established in 1923.

The Wyndham Report of 1957 into secondary school education led to the Public Education Act 1961 and the closure of smaller private schools; Brighton College was one such school, closing in 1960.

== Houses ==
The school was divided into houses. By 1932 there were four: Kendel, Wentworth, Hayes Williams and Allenby.

== Principals ==
- Miss Ethel Milne, 1889–1902.
- Miss Mildred Fry (later, and better known as, Mildred Muscio), 1903–1912.
- Miss Maria Eliza Hayes-Williams, 1912–1915.
- Miss K Allenby, 1914–1923.
- Miss Maude Mary Musson, 1924–1935.
- Miss Annie Isobel Croker, 1936–1960.

== Notable alumni ==
- Nancy Bird Walton
- Kylie Tennant, The future novelist was the recipient of many prizes in English literature at the school.

== Notable staff ==
- Mildred Muscio
- Alice Whitley
