= Moppy River =

Coordinates: 31°56′S 151°30′E

Moppy River Morpey Creek

Location
- Country: Australia
- State: New South Wales
- IBRA: New England Tablelands, NSW North Coast
- District: Upper Hunter, Mid North Coast
- Local government area: Mid-Coast Council

Physical characteristics
- Source: Mount Royal Range, Great Dividing Range
  - location: near Tunderbolts Lookout, Barrington Tops National Park
  - elevation: 1,500 m (4,900 ft)
- Mouth: confluence with the Barrington River
  - location: near Moppy
  - elevation: 356 m (1,168 ft)
- Length: 22 km (14 mi)

Basin features
- River system: Manning River catchment
- National park: Barrington Tops

Moppy River, a perennial river of the Manning River catchment, is located in the Upper Hunter district of New South Wales, Australia.

== Course and features ==
Moppy River rises in the Barrington Tops, on the eastern slopes of Mount Royal Range, south of Tunderbolts Lookout in the Barrington Tops National Park, and flows generally east before reaching its confluence with the Barrington River, near the village of Moppy. The river descends 1,140 metres (3,740 ft) over its 22 kilometres (14 mi) course.

== See also ==
- Rivers of New South Wales
- List of rivers of New South Wales (L–Z)
- List of rivers of Australia
