= Stratford, New South Wales =

Stratford New South Wales
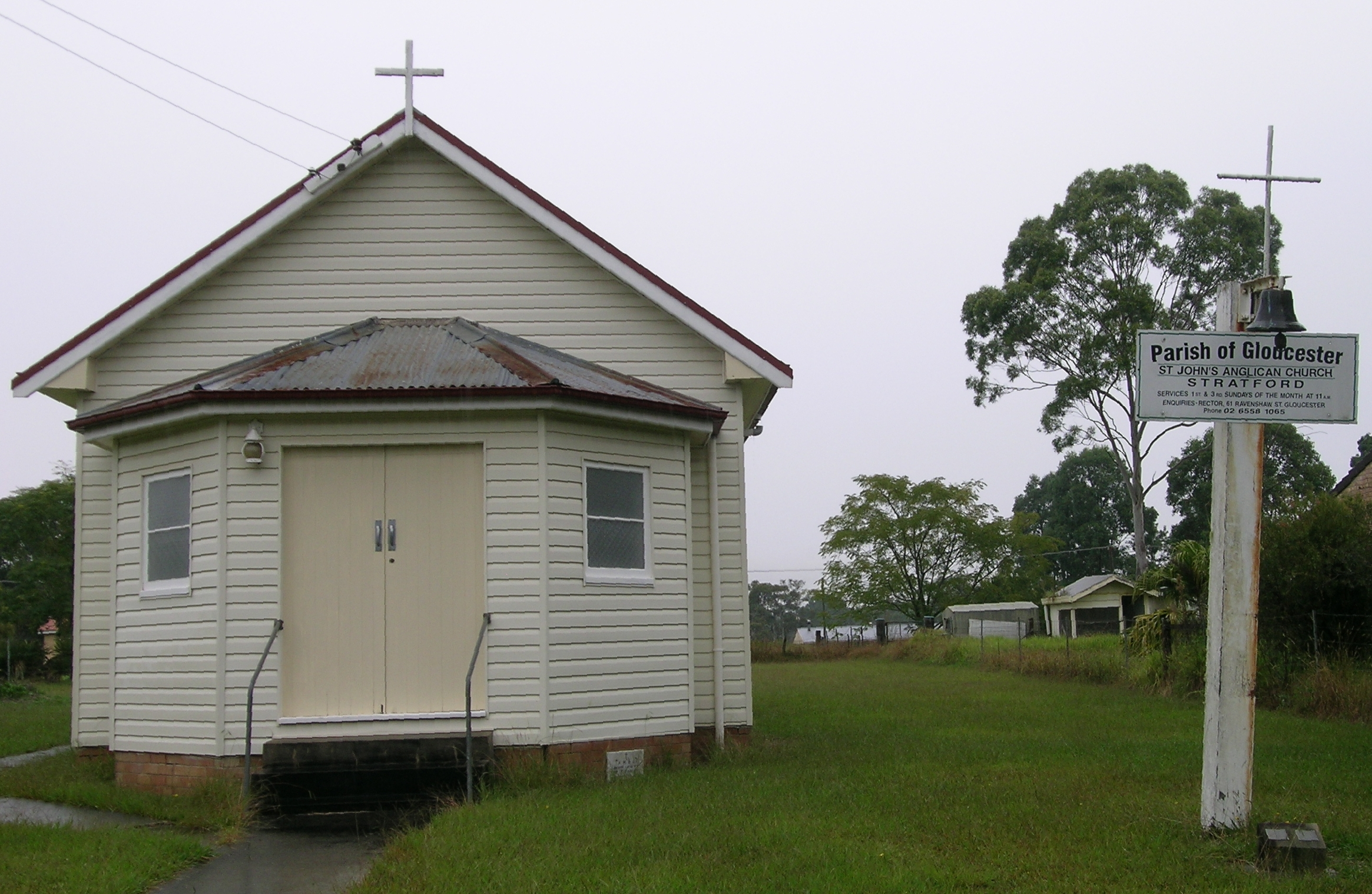
- St John's Anglican Church, Stratford, NSW.

- Coordinates: 32°6′54″S 151°56′4″E
- Population: 110 (township) (2006)^{Note1}
- Postcode(s): 2422
- Elevation: 130 m (427 ft)
- Time zone: AEST (UTC+10)
  - Summer (DST): AEDT (UTC+11)
- Location: 249 km (155 mi) N of Sydney; 13.6 km (8 mi) S of Gloucester; 109 km (68 mi) N of Newcastle; 66.3 km (41 mi) N of Pacific Highway
- LGA(s): Mid-Coast Council
- Region: Mid North Coast
- County: Gloucester
- Parish: Avon
- State electorate(s): Upper Hunter
- Federal division(s): Lyne

Stratford is a rural locality in the Mid-Coast Council local government area in the Hunter Region of New South Wales, Australia. The largest population centre in the area is the town of Stratford, which is approximately 14 kilometres (9 mi) south of Gloucester and 109 km (68 mi) north of Newcastle. Stratford, which is next to the Avon River, is on Bucketts Way, 66 km (41 mi) from the Pacific Highway, the nearest major highway.

At the 2006 census, the village of Stratford had a population of 110. The village has a park with cricket pitch and play-gym, a New South Wales Rural Fire Service shed, shop with petroleum, hall, church, public school and the Stratford lawn cemetery. The village is located on one of the main access routes to the Barrington Tops National Park.

The principal industries of the area include mining, beef cattle breeding and dairying. The nearby Stratford coal mine transports coal to Newcastle for export or the New South Wales Power Stations.

== Notes ==
1. This population figure is for the village only. The Australian Bureau of Statistics data for Stratford does not include the entire suburb.
