= Mouse racing =

Sport

Mouse racing is an activity in which live rodents are coaxed to travel through a miniature racecourse at fast speeds. The races generally take place at taverns, fairs, or fund-raising events and are popular in several countries. Mouse racing has also attracted criticism from animal rights groups, who believe the activity is too stressful for the mice.

== Variations ==
There are several different types of mouse races. Some races use elaborate sets built to resemble a horse racing track, while others are more like obstacle courses, with wheels and other challenges. In 1940s England, mice were sometimes made to propel miniature boats by running on treadmills, which were connected to the boat's paddle-wheels.

In many contemporary races, an individual mouse trainer organizes the event using his own animals and invites spectators to make bets, with the proceeds often going to some specific cause. In the United States, one of the most well-known charity-race organizers was Harvey Coffee. He organized events throughout the American Midwest and was mentioned in the St. Louis Post-Dispatch.

The famous World War II movie, Stalag 17, features a scene with mouse racing in a barracks.

More competitive versions of the activity have existed; for example, a Western Australia Mouse Racing Association was founded in 1972 to organize competitions among mouse owners, who trained their pets to break speed records. Australia continues to hold a national Mouse Cup in rural Bylong, which attracts about 800 participants. Rats are explicitly banned at the more competitive mouse races.

== Criticism ==
Mouse racing has received criticism from animal rights groups since the 1940s, when the RSPCA condemned the English aquatic races. They declared, "Anyone who knows about boys will know that [...] the mice will be prodded unmercifully to ginger them up". An advocate of the activity replied in defense, "No cruelty is imposed on the creature since experience shows that mice derive much enjoyment from their wheel turning activity". More recently, animal rights societies in New Zealand criticized mouse races at local taverns, noting that the often-loud audiences could frighten the mice with their cheering. However, one race manager replied, "If they can't take a joke in the world, then what's wrong with them?".
