= Bylong River =

River in New South Wales, Australia

Coordinates: 32°25′54″S 150°08′05″E

Bylong River Bylong Creek

Location
- Country: Australia
- State: New South Wales
- Region: NSW North Coast (IBRA), Central Tablelands, Hunter
- Local government area: Mid-Western Regional

Physical characteristics
- Source: Wollemi National Park, Great Dividing Range
  - location: near Rylstone
  - elevation: 748 m (2,454 ft)
- Mouth: confluence with the Goulburn River
  - location: north of Bylong
  - elevation: 218 m (715 ft)
- Length: 48 km (30 mi)

Basin features
- River system: Hunter River catchment
- Tributaries
  - left: Cousins Creek, Growee River, Coggan Creek
  - right: Reedy Creek (New South Wales), Wattle Creek, Lee Creek (New South Wales), Dry Creek (Bylong River)
- National park: Wollemi NP

Bylong River, a perennial river of the Hunter River catchment, is located in the Central Tablelands and Upper Hunter regions of New South Wales, Australia.

== Course ==
Bylong River rises in the central tablelands of the Capertee Valley, within Wollemi National Park, on the north-western slopes of the Great Dividing Range, below Goat Mountain, and flows generally north-east, joined by seven tributaries, including the Growee River, before reaching its confluence with the Goulburn River, north of the village of Bylong. The river descends 530 metres (1,740 ft) over its 48 kilometres (30 mi) course.

The Goulburn River eventually flows into the Hunter River, a major waterway which flows into the Tasman Sea at Newcastle.

== See also ==
- List of rivers of Australia
- List of rivers of New South Wales (A–K)
- Rivers of New South Wales
