= Barrington River (New South Wales) =

River in Australia

Coordinates: 31°58′S 151°44′E

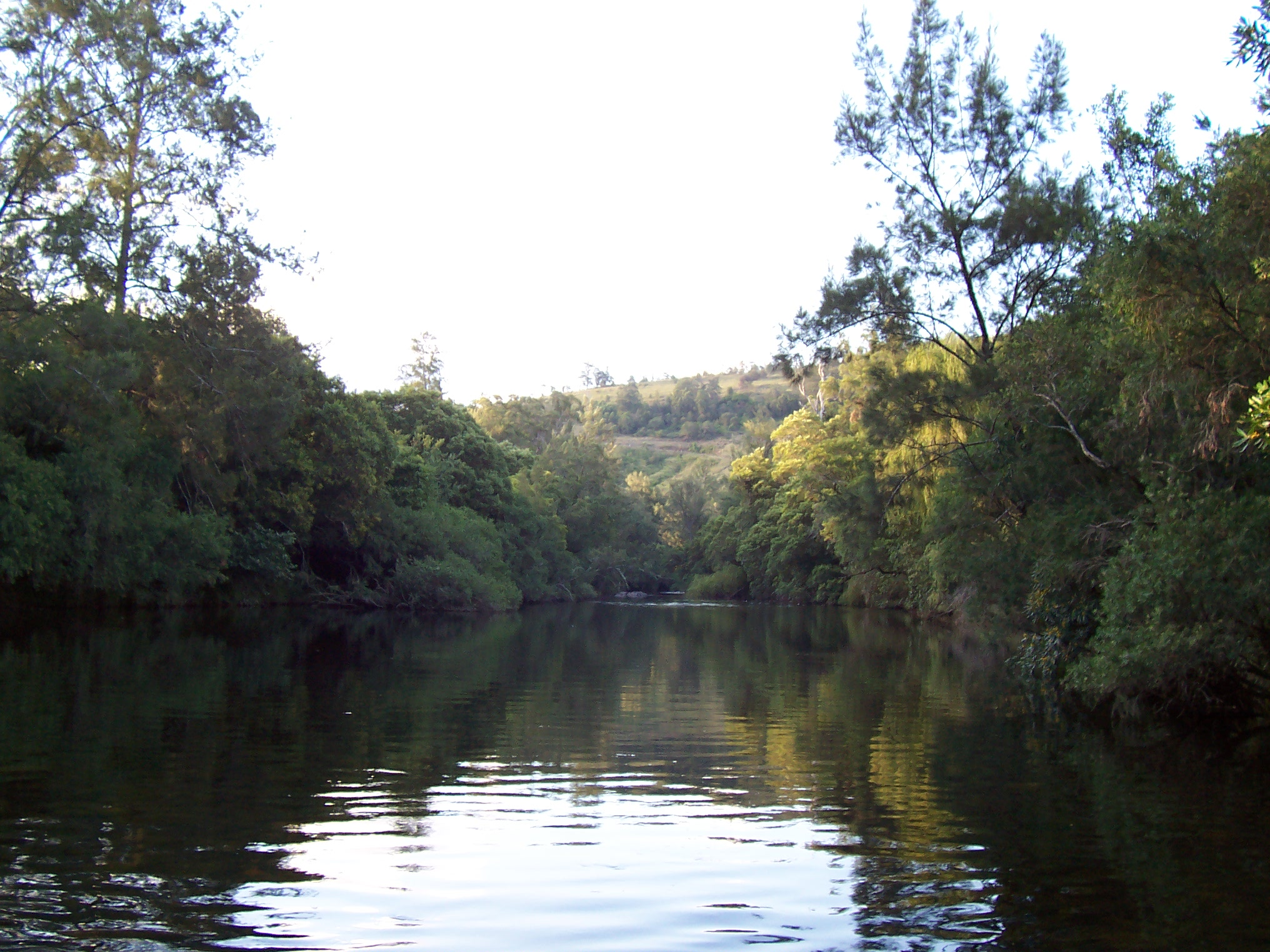
- Barrington River, downstream of Barrington Tops National Park.
- Etymology: In honour of Lord Barrington

Location
- Country: Australia
- State: New South Wales
- IBRA: NSW North Coast, Upper Hunter
- Local government area: Dungog, Mid-Coast Council
- Town: Gloucester

Physical characteristics
- Source: Mt Royal Range, Great Dividing Range
  - location: below Carey's Peak, Barrington Volcano
  - elevation: 1,460 m (4,790 ft)
- Mouth: confluence with the Gloucester River
  - location: near Gloucester
  - elevation: 85 m (279 ft)
- Length: 93 km (58 mi)

Basin features
- River system: Manning River catchment
- Tributaries
  - left: Cobark River, Moppy River
  - right: Beean Beean Creek, Kerripit River, Mackays Creek
- National park: Barrington Tops

Barrington River, a perennial river of the Manning River catchment, is located in the Upper Hunter district of New South Wales, Australia.

== Course and features ==
Barrington River rises below Carey's Peak, within Barrington Volcano, on the eastern slopes of the Mt Royal Range, within the Great Dividing Range, and flows generally east through the localities of Moppy, Rawdon Vale, Bindera and the town of Barrington, joined by five tributaries including the Kerripit, Cobark, and Moppy rivers, before reaching its confluence with the Gloucester River, near Gloucester. The river descends 1,370 metres (4,490 ft) over its 93 kilometres (58 mi) course.

The river was named in honour of Lord Barrington.

The river is popular with kayakers and canoers due to its sections of white water and attractive scenery, and flows through the Barrington Tops National Park.

== See also ==
- Rivers of New South Wales
- List of rivers of New South Wales (A–K)
- List of rivers of Australia
