= Walcha News =

Front page of The Walcha News, 16 December 1932

The Walcha News, originally published as The Walcha News and Southern New England Advocate, is an English language newspaper published in Walcha, New South Wales.

== History ==
Witness was the first newspaper published in Walcha in 1889 founded by Mr. F. Townshend. The Walcha News and Southern New England Advocate was published from 1904 to 1932 in opposition to the Witness which it then absorbed in 1928. It became The Walcha News in 1932 and is still published today. Erle Lewis ("Blue") Hogan managed and edited The Walcha News from 1950 to 1977.

== Digitisation ==
The paper has been digitised as part of the Australian Newspapers Digitisation Program of the National Library of Australia.

== See also ==
- List of newspapers in Australia
- List of newspapers in New South Wales
