= Bowman River =

Coordinates: 31°55′S 151°54′E

Location
- Country: Australia
- State: New South Wales
- IBRA: NSW North Coast
- District: Upper Hunter
- Local government area: Mid-Coast Council

Physical characteristics
- Source: Great Dividing Range
  - location: near Upper Bowman
  - elevation: 718 m (2,356 ft)
- Mouth: confluence with the Gloucester River
  - location: near Tugrabakh
  - elevation: 83 m (272 ft)
- Length: 54 km (34 mi)

Basin features
- River system: Gloucester River catchment

Bowman River, a perennial river of the Gloucester River catchment, is located in the Upper Hunter district of New South Wales, Australia.

== Course and features ==
Bowman River rises on the eastern slopes of the Great Dividing Range, near Upper Bowman, and flows generally south southeast and east before reaching its confluence with the Gloucester River, near Tugrabakh. The river descends 635 metres (2,083 ft) over its 54 kilometres (34 mi) course.

== See also ==
- Rivers of New South Wales
- List of rivers of New South Wales (A–K)
- List of rivers of Australia
