= Gloucester River =

Coordinates: 31°58′S 151°59′E

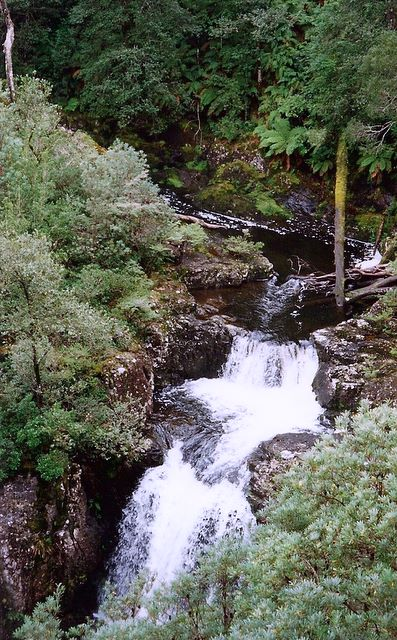
- Upper reaches of the Gloucester River, at Gloucester Falls, within Barrington Tops National Park, 1997.

Location
- Country: Australia
- State: New South Wales
- IBRA: NSW North Coast
- District: Upper Hunter
- Local government area: Dungog, Mid-Coast Council

Physical characteristics
- Source: Gloucester Tops, Great Dividing Range
  - location: north northwest of Dungog
  - elevation: 1,190 m (3,900 ft)
- Mouth: confluence with the Manning River
  - location: west of Wingham
  - elevation: 38 m (125 ft)
- Length: 102 km (63 mi)

Basin features
- River system: Manning River catchment
- Tributaries
  - left: Barrington River, Bowman River
  - right: Berrico Creek, Buggs Creek, Sandy Creek (Upper Hunter, New South Wales), Avon River
- National park: Barrington Tops

Gloucester River (/ˈɡlɒstər/ GLOST-ər), a perennial river and major tributary of the Manning River catchment, is located in the Mid North Coast hinterland New South Wales, Australia.

== Course and features ==
Gloucester River rises within Gloucester Tops, on the eastern slopes of the Great Dividing Range, south east of Gloucester, and flows generally east northeast, joined by six tributaries including the Avon, Barrington, and Bowman rivers, before reaching its confluence with the Manning River, west of Wingham. The river descends 1,150 metres (3,770 ft) over its 102 kilometres (63 mi) course.

The headwaters of the river originate in the World Heritage Barrington Tops region, flowing through the Barrington Tops National Park comprising Antarctic beech and southern sassafras high altitude rainforest. In the middle and lower reaches, the river flows through subtropical rainforest that includes red cedar and rosewood trees.

== See also ==
- Rivers of New South Wales
- List of rivers of New South Wales (A–K)
- List of rivers of Australia

== Gallery ==
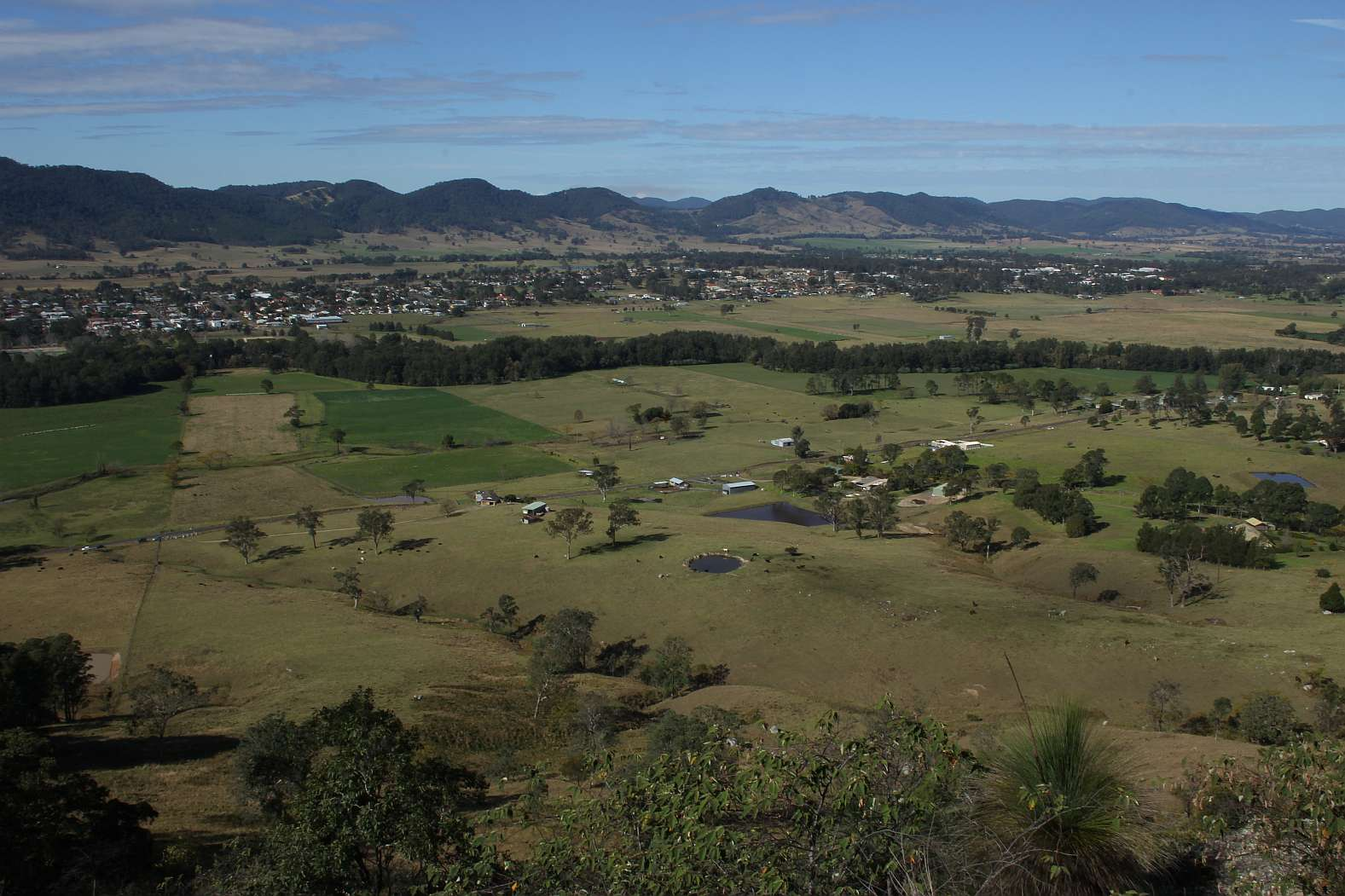
The Gloucester River meandering through the Gloucester Valley, viewed from Bucketts Tops, near the town of Gloucester, 2013

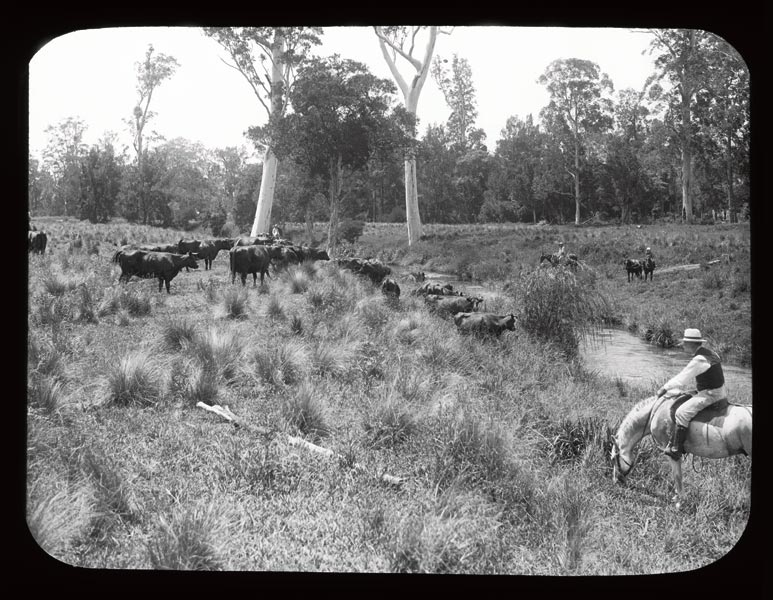
Cattle grazing on the banks of the Gloucester River, 1908
