= Bylong, New South Wales =

Bylong
- Town
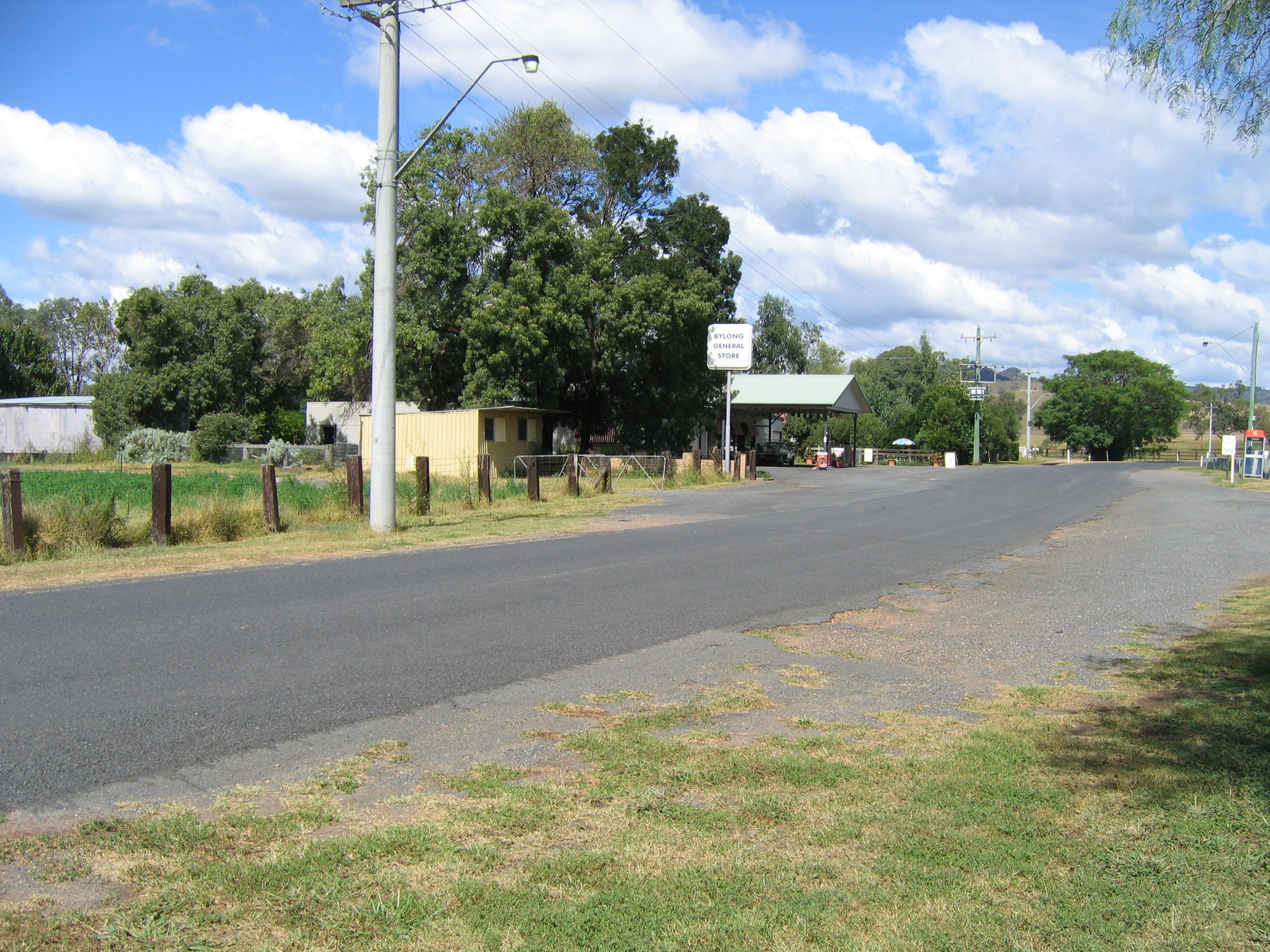
- Bylong village

- Coordinates: 32°25′0″S 150°07′0″E
- Country: Australia
- State: New South Wales
- LGA: Mid-Western Regional Council

Government
  - State electorate: Upper Hunter
  - Federal divisions: Hunter; Parkes

Population
  - Total: 19 (SAL 2021)
- Postcode: 2849
Localities around Bylong
Coggan, New South Wales
Wollar	Bylong	Murrumbo, New South Wales
Barigan, New South Wales	Budden, New South Wales	Upper Bylong, New South Wales

Bylong is a village in New South Wales, Australia, in the Mid-Western Regional Council. It is located on the Bylong Valley Way.

The area is home to numerous horse studs. The champion racehorse and sire Heroic was born in the area.

Bylong hosts an annual mouse racing event.

== Access ==
Bylong can be accessed from the Hunter Valley by travelling west along the Golden Highway and turn onto the Bylong Valley Way, one kilometre (one mile) before Sandy Hollow. If travelling from Ilford, Bylong can be accessed by travelling two kilometres (one mile) north along the Castlereagh Highway and turn onto the Bylong Valley Way.

== Railways ==
Bylong has a railway crossing loop, one kilometre (one mile) east of Bylong on the Sandy Hollow-Gulgong railway line. The railway passes through a two-kilometre-long (one-mile) tunnel in the Bylong Range, eight kilometres (five miles) to the east-southeast (32°26′11.0″S 150°12′00.8″E) between the Bylong River and Murrumbo Creek valleys.

Preceding station	Former services	Following station
Akuna towards Gulgong	Sandy Hollow–Gulgong Line	Kerrabee towards Sandy Hollow
