= Gloucester, New South Wales =

Gloucester
- Town
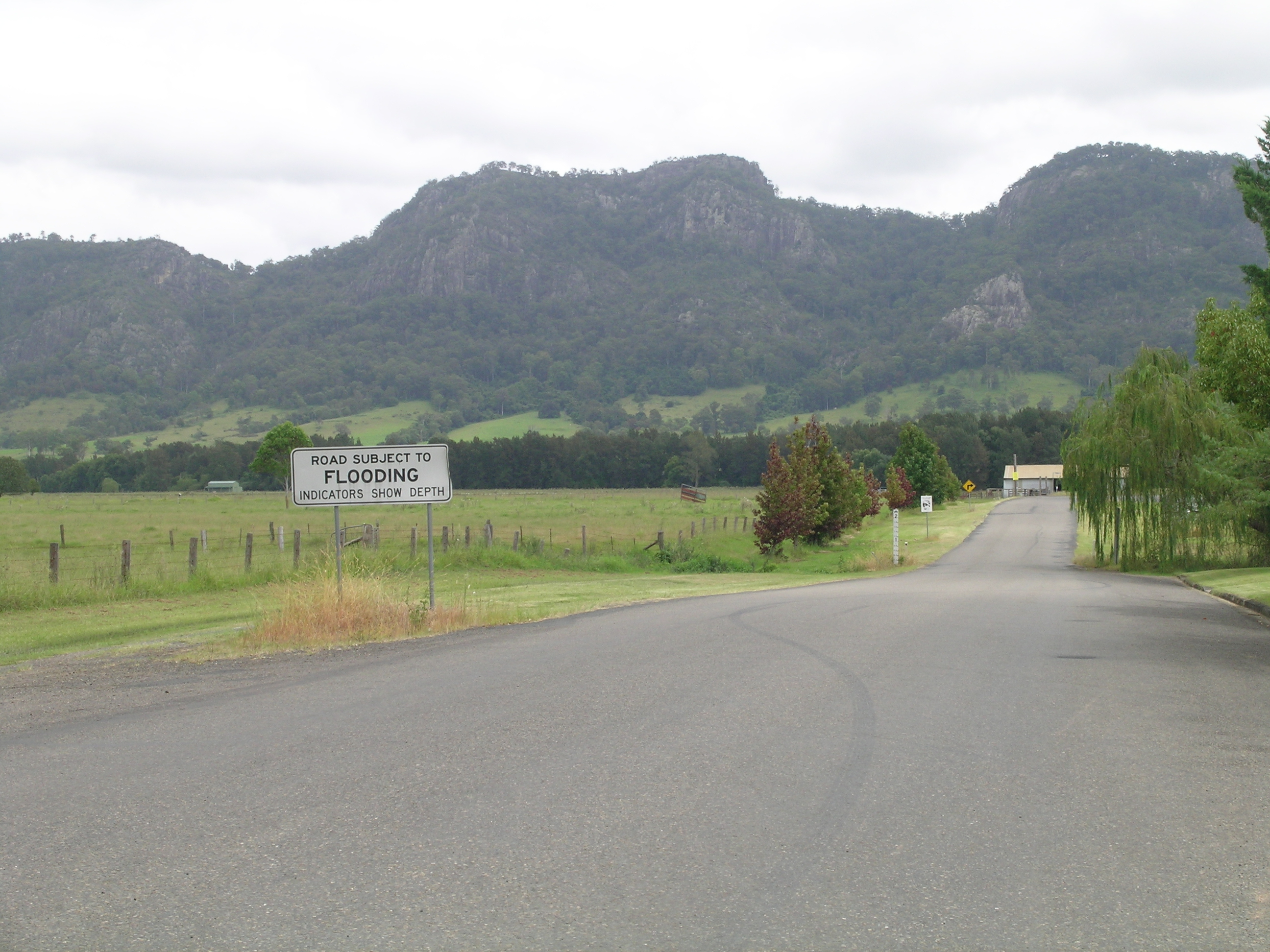
- The Bucketts Range, Gloucester, 2008

- Coordinates: 32°00′34″S 151°57′37″E
- Country: Australia
- State: New South Wales
- LGA: Mid-Coast Council
- Location: 145 km (90 mi) N of Newcastle; 220 km (140 mi) N of Sydney; 61 km (38 mi) NNE of Dungog; 78 km (48 mi) W of Taree; 60 km (37 mi) NW of Bulahdelah
- Established: 1855

Government
  - State electorate: Upper Hunter
  - Federal division: Lyne
- Elevation: 111 m (364 ft)

Population
  - Total: 2,469 (2021 census)
- Postcode: 2422

Gloucester (/ˈɡlɒstər/ GLOST-ər), is a town in Mid-Coast Council, within the Barrington Coast hinterland of the lower Mid North Coast of the state of New South Wales, Australia. It is the closest town to world heritage Barrington Tops National Park.

Gloucester is situated on the North Coast railway line and can be accessed from the southeast from Newcastle, located 145 kilometres (90 mi) via the Bucketts Way, or from the north via Thunderbolts Way. Gloucester River flows adjacent to the town, just above its junction with the Avon River.

At the 2021 census, Gloucester had a population of 2,469.

== History ==
The Gloucester district was first visited by government surveyor Henry Dangar in January 1826 and then by Robert Dawson, Chief Agent for the Australian Agricultural Company later in the same year, accompanied by Henry Dangar. Settlement occurred in the 1830s. The township of Gloucester was first established in 1855, primarily for sheep farming, however it became apparent that the land was not entirely suitable. The main industries of the Gloucester area are tourism, timber, and cattle farming. The timber industry has been prevalent in Gloucester since the late 19th century, and it and cattle farming (dairy and beef cattle) are still major industries in and around Gloucester.

In 1876, gold was discovered in Copeland, a small town north-west of Gloucester. Copeland became a large town of over 3,000 inhabitants due to the gold discovery and the large number of red cedar trees. However, the population has since dwindled to a few hundred.

The Australian Agricultural Company was originally awarded mineral rights to 500,000 acres (200,000 ha) between the Karuah River and the Manning River which covered the Gloucester district. The company employed surveyors in 1856–57 to undertake a trial survey for a railway between Port Stephens and Stroud and further north to the Manning River, passing what became Gloucester. At the time it was felt that with the "formidable obstructions" from ranges and rivers, a railway line would be impracticable and construction did not proceed, and coal mining was abandoned before it had commenced.

In 1923, electricity came to Gloucester. The Gloucester Electric Supply Company was formed by Fred Lowe, who was called to Gloucester by a syndicate (mainly of local graziers) to assist in the development of a Gloucester electric supply. He presented plans for a ‘turn key’ installation of the complete plant which was accepted by the syndicate. The shareholders in the new company were Fred and his brother Ernest, who jointly held the great majority of the shares, and a number of local people. There were many ups and downs, especially during 1929, the depression. In the middle 1930s, the State Government was offering subsidies for the construction of rural lines. The first rural line along the Bucketts Road was opened on 9 September 1938. Fred Lowe designed and surveyed the line exercising his expertise in surveying which he acquired whilst working in New Zealand as a young man.

In 1943 the company’s 20-year franchise ended. However it was wartime and the Mid-Coast County Council did not exercise its right to acquire the company’s assets and take over the electricity undertaking till 1 July 1946. Fred was employed by the council as its electrical engineer. He still persisted with rural line extensions and completed the Avon Valley line taking electricity to Stratford. He remained as council electrical engineer until he retired in 1951. At a farewell function the Shire President, Cr. J.N. Channon, said, "We cannot let the opportunity pass without expressing our deep appreciation and gratitude to Mr Lowe for what he has done for Gloucester."

In 1995, Gloucester Coal, originally Stratford Coal, began mining in Stratford, a small village 12 kilometres (7.5 mi) south of Gloucester. The Stratford mine is now owned by Yancoal and is the only operating coal mine in the valley. Plans by AGL to install 330 coal seam gas wells in the Gloucestor Valley were cancelled in 2016 following a community campaign and blockade of exploration sites.

In March 1972 the Governor of New South Wales, Roden Cutler and Lady Cutler toured the district and attended a formal Civic Reception at the Gloucester Bucketts Motel.

For most of the twentieth century it boasted two cinemas in the main thoroughfare – Church Street: The Star (opposite Permewans, closed c. 1968), and the Majestic Theatre, that was built in the early 1920s. The Majestic permanently closed its doors c. 1980 and the building still stands, now redeveloped as a shopping arcade.

The district's weekly newspaper is The Gloucester Advocate.

== Transport ==
Gloucester railway station serves the town.

Forster Buslines runs route 308 from Forster to Gloucester with one service in each direction on school days.

The nearest airport is served by Newcastle Airport which is located approximately 99 km south of Gloucester.

== Media ==
=== Television ===
All major digital-only television channels are available in Gloucester. The networks and the channels they broadcast are listed as follows:

- Seven (formerly Prime7 and Prime Television), 7two, 7mate, 7Bravo, 7flix. Seven Network owned and operated station channels.
- Nine (NBN), 9Go!, 9Gem and 9Life. Nine Network owned and operated station channels.
- 10, 10 Drama and 10 Comedy. Network 10 owned and operated station channels.
- ABC, ABC Family, ABC Kids, ABC Entertains and ABC News, part of the Australian Broadcasting Corporation.
- SBS, SBS2, SBS World Movies, SBS WorldWatch, SBS Food and NITV, part of the Special Broadcasting Service.

Of the three main commercial networks:

- The Seven Network airs a half-hour local Seven News bulletin for the Mid North Coast at 6 pm each weeknight. It is broadcast from studios in Canberra with reporters based at a local newsroom in the city.
- Nine airs NBN News, a regional half and hour-long program including opt-outs for the Mid North Coast, every weeknight at 5:30 pm. It is broadcast from studios in Newcastle with reporters based at a local newsroom in the city.
- Network 10 airs short local news updates throughout the day, broadcast from its Hobart studios.

=== Radio ===
Radio stations that broadcast to the town are ABC Mid North Coast, Breeze 97.7 and community based station, Bucketts Radio which is staffed 100% by volunteers only and is funded by sponsorship advertising from mainly local businesses.

=== Newspapers ===
The town is served by the local newspaper, Gloucester Advocate which is available on print and online.

== Events ==
Gloucester was the venue for the first Groovin' the Moo music festival held at the Gloucester Showground on 24 April 2005. The festival included well known musical acts such as Screaming Jets, Killing Heidi and Evermore. Although the festival has not returned to Gloucester, it has gone on to be an annual event held in regional areas across Australia.

== Population ==
According to the 2021 census of Population, there were 2,469 people in Gloucester.

- Aboriginal and Torres Strait Islander people made up 9.7% of the population.
- 86.2% of people were born in Australia and 93.3% of people spoke only English at home.
- The most common responses for religion were No Religion 35.3%, Anglican 25.8%, and Catholic 14.1%.

== Gallery ==
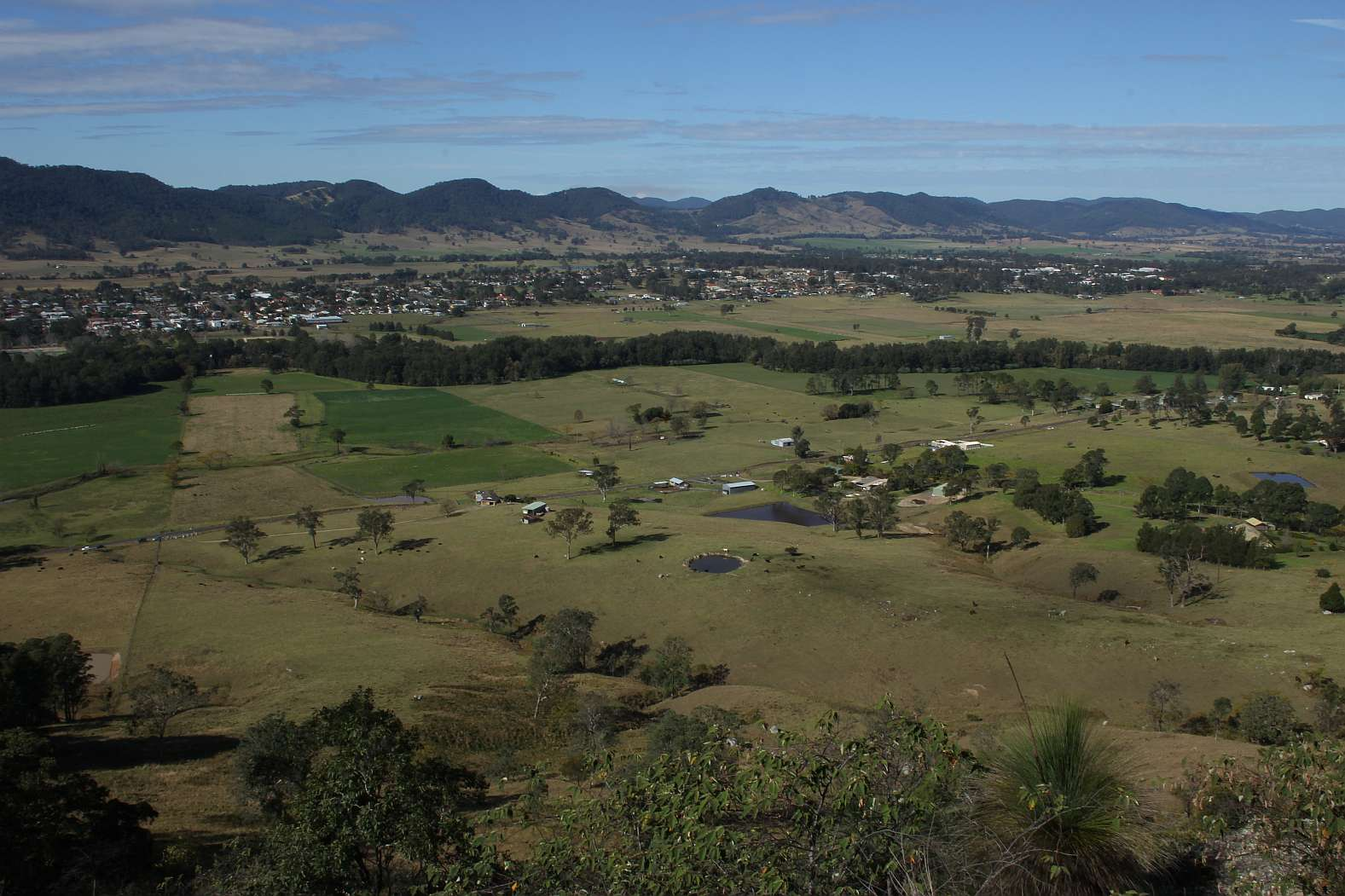
A view of the town of Gloucester, the Gloucester River, and Gloucester Valley, from Bucketts Tops, 2013.

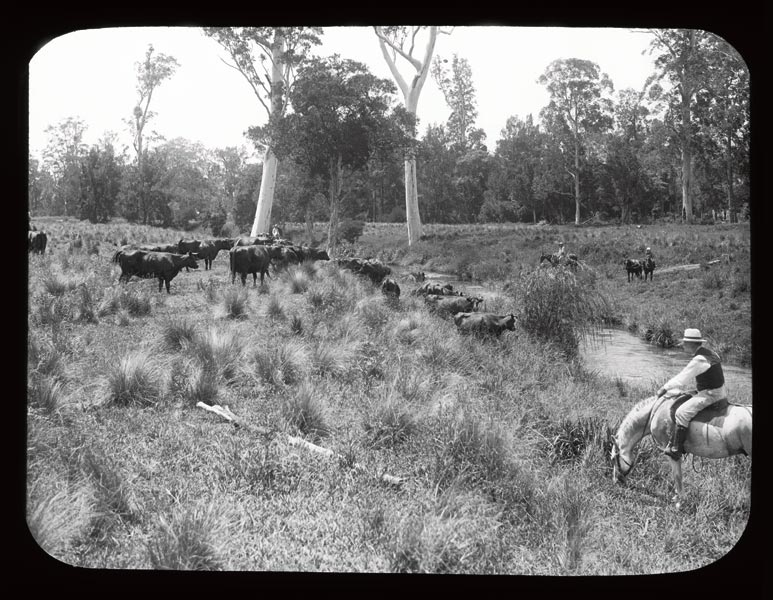
Dairy farming in the Gloucester Valley, 1908. Photo courtesy of the NSW State Records Authority.
