= Awabakal Local Aboriginal Land Council =

Local Aboriginal Land Council in New South Wales, Australia

- Abbreviation: Awabakal LALC
- Formation: 1985
- Type: Local Aboriginal Land Council (NSW)
- Legal status: Statutory body corporate
- Headquarters: Newcastle, New South Wales, Australia
- Region served: Newcastle and Lake Macquarie
- Website: www.alalc.com.au

Awabakal Local Aboriginal Land Council (Awabakal LALC) is a Local Aboriginal Land Council based in Newcastle, in the Hunter Region of New South Wales, Australia. It forms part of the network of Aboriginal land councils established under the Aboriginal Land Rights Act 1983 (NSW) and operates across Newcastle and Lake Macquarie. Within the City of Newcastle local government area, City of Newcastle identifies it as the relevant Local Aboriginal Land Council south of the Hunter River. It is also registered as a charity with the Australian Charities and Not-for-profits Commission.

Awabakal LALC has made successful land claims including the former Newcastle Post Office, and in 2022 it was the subject of the NSW Independent Commission Against Corruption's Operation Skyline report into corrupt land dealings involving former board members.

== History ==
The City of Newcastle acknowledges that the Awabakal and Worimi peoples were the first peoples of the Newcastle area and recognises their continuing connection to land, water and community. Much of what is known about the Awabakal language was recorded in the nineteenth century by the Awabakal leader Biraban and the missionary Lancelot Threlkeld.

According to the ICAC's 2022 Operation Skyline report, Awabakal LALC was first established in 1985, ceased to operate for a brief period, and was re-established in 1992. In October 2016, the Minister for Aboriginal Affairs appointed an administrator to the council; the period of administration ended in October 2018.

== Land claims ==
=== Newcastle Post Office ===
In June 2011, the NSW Aboriginal Land Council lodged a land claim over the former Newcastle Post Office on behalf of Awabakal LALC. The Minister for Primary Industries refused the claim in August 2011, but the Land and Environment Court of New South Wales upheld the appeal in 2014 and ordered the land be transferred to the council.

The court held that the site was claimable Crown land because it was not lawfully used or occupied and was not needed or likely to be needed for an essential public purpose at the date of claim.

In 2018, council members agreed to sell the heritage-listed building to Sydney-based property investor Jerry Schwartz for $3.5 million.

=== Other claims ===
Other reported successful claims included King Edward Headland Reserve and the former Burwood Colliery Bowling Club site in 2018.

The Newcastle Herald reported in 2026 that Awabakal LALC had made 27 successful land claims in the previous 40 years and had an unresolved claim over the University of Newcastle's Callaghan campus.

== ICAC investigation (Operation Skyline) ==
In October 2022, the NSW Independent Commission Against Corruption released its report on Operation Skyline, which investigated dealings involving Awabakal LALC land between 2014 and 2016. The commission found that former chairperson Debbie Dates, former deputy chairperson Richard Green, Nicholas Petroulias and solicitor Despina Bakis had engaged in corrupt conduct through a scheme involving the purported sale or development of council-owned land.

The commission said the scheme resulted in more than $1 million in benefits and made 15 corruption-prevention recommendations. The ICAC investigation page states that a brief of evidence was provided to the Director of Public Prosecutions on 25 October 2024 and that the commission was awaiting the DPP's decision on whether proceedings would be taken.

== See also ==
- Aboriginal Land Rights Act 1983
- Awabakal
- Awabakal language
- NSW Aboriginal Land Council
- Newcastle, New South Wales
- List of Local Aboriginal Land Councils in New South Wales
