= Bahtabah Local Aboriginal Land Council =

Local Aboriginal Land Council in New South Wales, Australia

- Abbreviation: Bahtabah LALC
- Type: Local Aboriginal Land Council (NSW)
- Legal status: Statutory body corporate
- Headquarters: Blacksmiths, New South Wales, Australia
- Region served: Eastern Lake Macquarie

Bahtabah Local Aboriginal Land Council (Bahtabah LALC) is a Local Aboriginal Land Council based at Blacksmiths, in the eastern Lake Macquarie area of New South Wales, Australia. It forms part of the network of Aboriginal land councils established under the Aboriginal Land Rights Act 1983 (NSW).

Lake Macquarie City Council's Arts, Heritage and Cultural Plan 2017–2027 says there are three Local Aboriginal Land Councils in the city: Awabakal (north), Bahtabah (east and the lake) and Biraban (west). NSW National Parks and Wildlife Service states that Bahtabah LALC represents the Aboriginal community in the area now covered by Wallarah National Park.

== Land claims ==
=== Pelican Marina site ===
In February 2021, NBN News reported that Bahtabah LALC had won a land claim over the former Pelican Marina site on Lake Macquarie, exactly five years after the marina collapsed into the lake. The Crown land site had been unused since the collapse.

=== Lake Macquarie claim ===
ABC News reported in 2011 that the NSW Government had refused a Bahtabah LALC claim over the entire water body of Lake Macquarie. The council had lodged the claim the previous year but Lands Minister Tony Kelly said the lake was needed for essential public uses and was therefore not claimable Crown land.

== Place name change ==
SBS NITV reported in 2021 that Lake Macquarie City Council voted 8–5 to change the name of an island in Swansea that had carried a racial slur. The proposed new name was Pirrita Island, using an Awabakal word for oysters from the mangrove tree and NITV said Bahtabah LALC and the Awabakal Descendants Traditional Owners Aboriginal Corporation had been lobbying for the change.

By 2022, Lake Macquarie City Council was using the name Pirrita Island for the site in council project material and media releases.

== See also ==
- Awabakal
- NSW Aboriginal Land Council
- List of Local Aboriginal Land Councils in New South Wales
