= Worimi Local Aboriginal Land Council =

- Abbreviation: Worimi LALC
- Type: Local Aboriginal Land Council (NSW)
- Legal status: Statutory body corporate
- Headquarters: Williamtown, New South Wales, Australia
- Region served: Port Stephens area
- Website: www.worimi.org.au

Worimi Local Aboriginal Land Council (Worimi LALC) is a Local Aboriginal Land Council based at Williamtown, in the Port Stephens area of New South Wales, Australia. It forms part of the network of Aboriginal land councils established under the Aboriginal Land Rights Act 1983 (NSW). Port Stephens Council identifies the Worimi as the traditional owners of the Port Stephens area.

The council is closely associated with the Worimi conservation lands at Stockton Bight and has made successful land claims at Lemon Tree Passage and Anna Bay.

== Worimi Conservation Lands ==
Following land claims made by Worimi LALC in the 1990s, the Worimi Conservation Lands Aboriginal Ownership and Leaseback Agreement was established in 2007 over the Stockton Bight lands now collectively known as the Worimi conservation lands.

NSW National Parks and Wildlife Service says the lands cover approximately 4,029 hectares between Fern Bay and Anna Bay in Port Stephens and include Worimi National Park, Worimi State Conservation Area and Worimi Regional Park.

The Worimi people and NSW National Parks and Wildlife Service jointly manage the lands, which include the largest moving coastal sand dunes in the southern hemisphere.

== Land claims ==
In December 2024, Crown Lands said 10.69 hectares of bushland at Lemon Tree Passage would be transferred as freehold to Worimi LALC following a successful land claim.

In October 2025, Crown Lands said four land claims and three partial land claims lodged by the council had been granted over 12.51 hectares of urban bushland and sand dunes near Birubi Beach at Anna Bay.

== See also ==
- Aboriginal Land Rights Act 1983
- Worimi
- Worimi conservation lands
- Stockton Beach
- Port Stephens
- NSW Aboriginal Land Council
- List of Local Aboriginal Land Councils in New South Wales
