= Red Chief Local Aboriginal Land Council =

Local Aboriginal Land Council in New South Wales, Australia

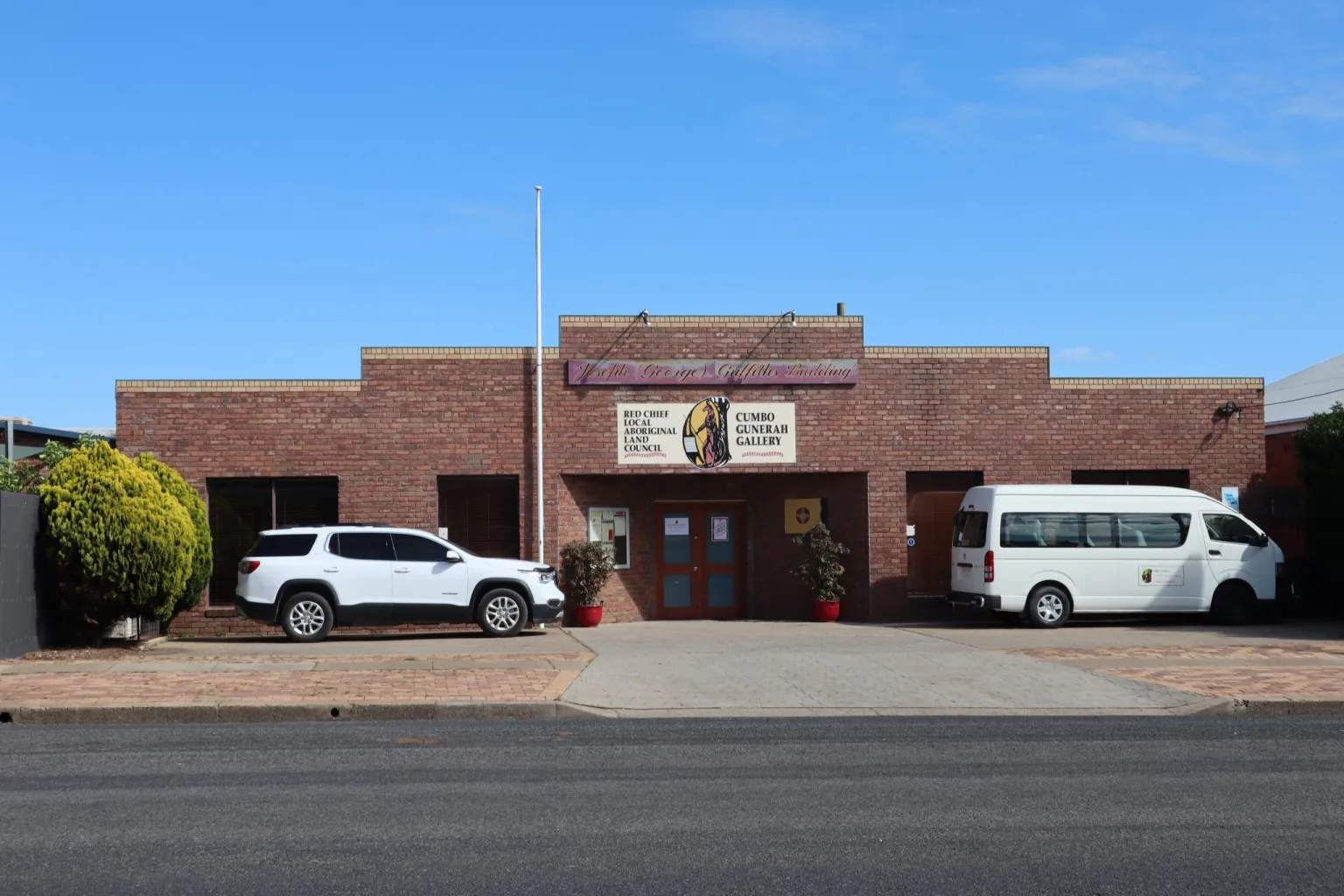
- Red Chief LALC office and Cumbo Gunerah Gallery, Gunnedah
- Abbreviation: Red Chief LALC
- Founded: c. 1983
- Type: Local Aboriginal Land Council
- Legal status: Body corporate
- Headquarters: Gunnedah, New South Wales
- Region served: Northern

The Red Chief Local Aboriginal Land Council (Red Chief LALC) is a body corporate constituted under the Aboriginal Land Rights Act 1983 (NSW), based in Gunnedah, New South Wales, Australia. It is one of 121 Local Aboriginal Land Councils that form the network coordinated by the NSW Aboriginal Land Council (NSWALC), and operates within the Northern region of that network.

The council serves the Aboriginal community in the Gunnedah area, which lies on the traditional country of the Gamilaraay (Kamilaroi) people.

== History ==
Red Chief LALC was constituted under the Aboriginal Land Rights Act 1983 (NSW), which received royal assent on 4 May 1983 and created the legislative framework for Local Aboriginal Land Councils across New South Wales. The Act established the NSW Aboriginal Land Council as the peak body and provided for a network of local land councils with functions in land acquisition, cultural heritage protection, and community development.

In July 2013, Red Chief LALC was involved in a dispute with Whitehaven Coal over the treatment of Aboriginal artefacts at the Maules Creek coal mine in the Gunnedah Basin. Approximately 60 Gomeroi traditional owners gathered outside Whitehaven Coal's Boggabri office, and the council called for a halt to all cultural heritage salvage work, alleging breaches of the Cultural Heritage Management Plan. The NSW Department of Planning said it would fully investigate the alleged breaches.

== Activities ==
According to its filings with the Australian Charities and Not-for-profits Commission (ACNC), Red Chief LALC operates programs in activities, support, and information for Aboriginal people in cultural connection, land and heritage site protection, and social housing. The council maintains an artefact gallery and conducts activities on country. Its housing program provides affordable accommodation to Aboriginal community members on lower incomes.

The council manages a travelling stock route that passes through the Maules Creek coal mine site in the Gunnedah Basin.

In 2025, the council delivered the Yinaar 2 Work program (Gunnedah Women's Workforce Readiness and Empowerment Initiative), supporting local Aboriginal women in reconnecting with employment, culture, and community leadership. The program was funded by a $186,000 grant from the NSW Government's Return to Work Pathways Program.

== Governance ==
Like all Local Aboriginal Land Councils in New South Wales, Red Chief LALC is constituted as a body corporate under the Aboriginal Land Rights Act 1983 and is subject to the governance and compliance framework set out in the Act. It sits within the Northern region of the NSWALC network, which is represented on the NSWALC Council by an elected regional councillor.

Following a period of administration, Troy Ruttley became chief executive of the council in October 2023.

== See also ==
- NSW Aboriginal Land Council
- List of Local Aboriginal Land Councils in New South Wales
- Aboriginal Land Rights Act 1983
- Gamilaraay
- Gunnedah
- Maules Creek coal mine
