= Tharawal Local Aboriginal Land Council =

Land council in New South Wales, Australia

- Abbreviation: Tharawal LALC
- Type: Local Aboriginal Land Council (NSW)
- Legal status: Statutory body corporate
- Headquarters: Couridjah, New South Wales, Australia
- Region served: Macarthur and south-western Sydney
- Website: www.tharawal.com.au

Tharawal Local Aboriginal Land Council (Tharawal LALC) is a Local Aboriginal Land Council based at Couridjah, New South Wales, Australia. It forms part of the network of Aboriginal land councils established under the Aboriginal Land Rights Act 1983 (NSW).

Local government sources identify the council as operating across the Campbelltown, Camden and Wollondilly areas and within parts of the Liverpool area.

== History and area ==
Campbelltown City Council reproduces the gazettal by which the Minister for Aboriginal Affairs constituted the Tharawal Local Aboriginal Land Council Area on 2 February 1984 under section 5(1) of the Aboriginal Land Rights Act 1983 (NSW).

Camden Council states that the Camden, Campbelltown and Wollondilly local government areas sit within the Tharawal Local Aboriginal Land Council boundaries. Liverpool City Council lists Tharawal among the Local Aboriginal Land Councils operating within Liverpool LGA and says the Holsworthy area falls within the Tharawal Local Aboriginal Land Council area.

== Conservation and environmental projects ==
NSW Planning says it is partnering with the NSW Aboriginal Land Council to deliver a $1 million Cumberland Plain grant program for Deerubbin, Tharawal and Gandangara Local Aboriginal Land Councils.

The department's current projects page states that Tharawal and Gandangara Local Aboriginal Land Councils have started implementing projects under the Cumberland Plain Grants Program.

In 2025, the NSW Government said the name of Warranmadhaa National Park was chosen in close consultation with Traditional Custodians, Tharawal Local Aboriginal Land Council and the local Aboriginal community.

== See also ==
- Aboriginal Land Rights Act 1983
- Dharawal
- Cumberland Plain Conservation Plan
- Campbelltown, New South Wales
- NSW Aboriginal Land Council
- List of Local Aboriginal Land Councils in New South Wales
