= La Perouse Local Aboriginal Land Council =

- Abbreviation: La Perouse LALC
- Formation: 1984
- Type: Local Aboriginal Land Council (NSW)
- Legal status: Statutory body corporate
- Headquarters: La Perouse, New South Wales, Australia
- Website: www.laperouse.org.au

La Perouse Local Aboriginal Land Council (La Perouse LALC) is a Local Aboriginal Land Council based at La Perouse in Sydney, New South Wales, Australia. It forms part of the network of Aboriginal land councils established under the Aboriginal Land Rights Act 1983 (NSW).

The National Museum of Australia describes La Perouse LALC as one of the founding land councils in New South Wales and one of the smallest by area, with a boundary extending from the south head of Sydney Harbour to Royal National Park. In 2025, the council was the successful appellant in a High Court of Australia decision concerning the interpretation of claimable Crown land under the Act.

== History ==
La Perouse is one of the few places in Sydney where Aboriginal people have maintained continuous connection to Country from before European settlement to the present. The Dictionary of Sydney identifies the original owners of the area as the Kameygal, whose coastal location provided access to plentiful fish, fresh water and natural shelter. Aboriginal residents retained an ongoing presence despite dispossession and government control over the reserve throughout the nineteenth and twentieth centuries.

The reserve was transferred to the New South Wales Aboriginal Lands Trust in 1973, and in 1984 the La Perouse Local Aboriginal Land Council was given title to Yarra Bay House, the La Perouse Aboriginal Reserve and adjacent land following a successful land claim.

On 26 January 1988, La Perouse was a major gathering point during the Australian Bicentenary, when large numbers of Aboriginal people and supporters assembled before marching through Sydney in protest, calling for land rights, justice and recognition. The annual gathering at La Perouse subsequently became the Survival Day concert, described by the Dictionary of Sydney as the largest national annual celebration of Aboriginal and Torres Strait Islander arts and culture.

In February 2016, the NSW Aboriginal Land Council reported that Prime Minister Malcolm Turnbull visited La Perouse LALC and met with local Aboriginal organisations to discuss housing, economic development and self-determination.

== Role and activities ==
Local Aboriginal Land Councils were established under the Aboriginal Land Rights Act 1983 (NSW) to hold land, lodge land claims, and deliver community benefit activities. The council is registered as a charity with the Australian Charities and Not-for-profits Commission.

According to the National Museum of Australia, La Perouse LALC plays a role in cultural heritage protection, environmental management, housing and youth services, and maintains a significant property portfolio.

The council's Gamay Rangers program focuses on land and sea Country around Gamay (Botany Bay), and a ten-year Sea Country Plan was launched in 2025.

In May 2025, Randwick City Council and La Perouse LALC announced a proposal to transform the La Perouse Museum and surrounding headland into a First Nations Cultural Precinct, with a pre-feasibility study estimating a cost of $99 million.

== Paddington Bowling Club land claim ==
La Perouse LALC was the successful appellant in La Perouse Local Aboriginal Land Council v Quarry Street Pty Ltd [2025] HCA 32, a High Court case concerning the interpretation of claimable Crown land under the Aboriginal Land Rights Act 1983 (NSW).

The case concerned the site of the former Paddington Bowling Club in Sydney's eastern suburbs. A 50-year Crown lease had been granted in 2010 and subsequently transferred to Quarry Street Pty Ltd but the site had largely fallen into disuse by 2015. In December 2016, the NSW Aboriginal Land Council lodged a bulk claim over land within the La Perouse LALC boundary, including the bowling club site. In December 2021, the NSW Minister for Planning approved the claim.

In 2024, the New South Wales Court of Appeal allowed a challenge by the leaseholder, holding that the land was being "used" within the meaning of s 36(1)(b) of the Act by virtue of the existing lease.

On 3 September 2025, the High Court, by a 3–2 majority, allowed the appeal and held that Crown land is not "lawfully used" merely because it is subject to a lease; rather, the land must be physically deployed for a purpose at the time a claim is made. The National Indigenous Times reported that NSWALC chair Raymond Kelly described the outcome as significant for the NSW land rights framework.

In January 2026, the title deed for the 7,788 square metre site was formally transferred to La Perouse LALC.

== See also ==
- Aboriginal Land Rights Act 1983
- NSW Aboriginal Land Council
- La Perouse, New South Wales
- List of Local Aboriginal Land Councils in New South Wales
