= Metropolitan Local Aboriginal Land Council =

Land council in Sydney

- Abbreviation: Metro LALC
- Type: Local Aboriginal Land Council (NSW)
- Legal status: Statutory body corporate
- Headquarters: Sydney, New South Wales, Australia
- Region served: Sydney metropolitan area
- Website: metrolalc.org.au

Metropolitan Local Aboriginal Land Council (Metro LALC) is a Local Aboriginal Land Council based in Sydney, New South Wales, Australia. It forms part of the network of Aboriginal land councils established under the Aboriginal Land Rights Act 1983 (NSW).

== History ==
The Dictionary of Sydney records that the council was formed in 1983 as the Redfern Land Council and adopted the name Metropolitan Local Aboriginal Land Council in 1985.

== City of Sydney cooperation ==
The City of Sydney publishes the text of a Principles of Cooperation agreement with Metro LALC. The agreement sets out a framework for communication, consultation and the consideration of development proposals affecting Aboriginal interests within the local government area, and recognises Metro LALC as the statutory body representing Aboriginal interests within its boundaries and as a significant landholder in the area.

== Northern Beaches ==
In August 2022, the Minister for Planning approved a Development Delivery Plan for six sites owned by Metro LALC in the Northern Beaches local government area. NSW Planning says the plan considers the high-level opportunities and constraints associated with future development of the sites.

Of the six sites, the Patyegarang site at Morgan Road, Belrose (formerly known as Lizard Rock) was identified as having the most potential. A planning proposal for the site, seeking rezoning to allow up to 450 dwellings and a cultural centre, was publicly exhibited between September and November 2023. NSW Planning says it received more than 3,700 submissions during the exhibition period.

== Gadigal Mural ==
In 2019, the Gadigal Mural project in Barnett Lane, Darlinghurst, was produced in consultation with Metro LALC. The Australian Design Centre says the mural extends more than 25 metres in length and 17 metres in height, and was curated by First Nations creative producers Lucy Simpson and Dennis Golding.

== See also ==
- Aboriginal Land Rights Act 1983
- Gadigal
- Redfern, New South Wales
- NSW Aboriginal Land Council
- List of Local Aboriginal Land Councils in New South Wales
