= Mindaribba Local Aboriginal Land Council =

- Abbreviation: Mindaribba LALC
- Type: Local Aboriginal Land Council (NSW)
- Legal status: Statutory body corporate
- Headquarters: Metford, New South Wales, Australia
- Region served: Lower Hunter Valley

Mindaribba Local Aboriginal Land Council (Mindaribba LALC) is a Local Aboriginal Land Council based at Metford, in the Maitland area of the lower Hunter Valley, New South Wales, Australia. It forms part of the network of Aboriginal land councils established under the Aboriginal Land Rights Act 1983 (NSW).

Maitland City Council states that the council covers more than 2,000 hectares of Wonnarua traditional lands and encompasses parts of the local government areas of Maitland, Cessnock, Singleton, Dungog Shire and Port Stephens.

== Cultural heritage ==
The My Maitland tourism website, published by Maitland City Council, says the Mindaribba Keeping Place (Henry Bolt Museum) opened in 1996.

In 2015, Museums Victoria repatriated ancestral remains to Mindaribba LALC and Wonnarua Elders in a ceremony at the Bunjilaka Aboriginal Cultural Centre at Melbourne Museum.

== Housing initiative ==
Crown Lands says it is working with Homes NSW, Cessnock Council, Mindaribba LALC and the NSW Aboriginal Land Council to investigate an opportunity for residential development on lands owned by Cessnock Council, Crown Lands and Mindaribba LALC in the Cessnock area.

== Hunter Transmission Project ==
The Newcastle Herald reported in September 2025 that Mindaribba LALC had criticised EnergyCo's consultation on the Hunter Transmission Project.

== See also ==
- Aboriginal Land Rights Act 1983
- Wonnarua
- Hunter Valley
- Maitland, New South Wales
- NSW Aboriginal Land Council
- List of Local Aboriginal Land Councils in New South Wales
