= Biraban Local Aboriginal Land Council =

- Abbreviation: Biraban LALC
- Formation: 18 May 2012
- Type: Local Aboriginal Land Council (NSW)
- Legal status: Statutory body corporate
- Headquarters: Speers Point, New South Wales, Australia
- Region served: Lake Macquarie area

Biraban Local Aboriginal Land Council (Biraban LALC) is a Local Aboriginal Land Council based at Speers Point, in the Lake Macquarie area of New South Wales, Australia. It forms part of the network of Aboriginal land councils established under the Aboriginal Land Rights Act 1983 (NSW).

== History ==
The NSW Government's Aboriginal land rights history states that the area which had comprised the Koompahtoo Local Aboriginal Land Council was constituted as Biraban Local Aboriginal Land Council on 18 May 2012 following a formal petition by Aboriginal people for a new council to be created.

== Landcom partnership ==
On 8 February 2022, Biraban LALC and Landcom signed a Memorandum of Understanding to work in partnership to identify and unlock projects in the Hunter region aimed at increasing housing affordability, supply and diversity. Landcom said it was the first MOU it had signed with a Local Aboriginal Land Council in regional New South Wales.

== Land claims ==
In June 2022, the NSW Government granted land claims to Biraban LALC over more than 34 hectares of Crown land across five separate areas in the Lake Macquarie local government area, including 19.09 hectares near Morisset and 12.75 hectares on Wangi Road.

The Newcastle Weekly reported in September 2022 that a separate 0.2-hectare block at Awaba had also been granted to Biraban LALC following another land claim.

== See also ==
- Aboriginal Land Rights Act 1983
- Awabakal
- City of Lake Macquarie
- NSW Aboriginal Land Council
- List of Local Aboriginal Land Councils in New South Wales
