= Gunnedah =

- Town
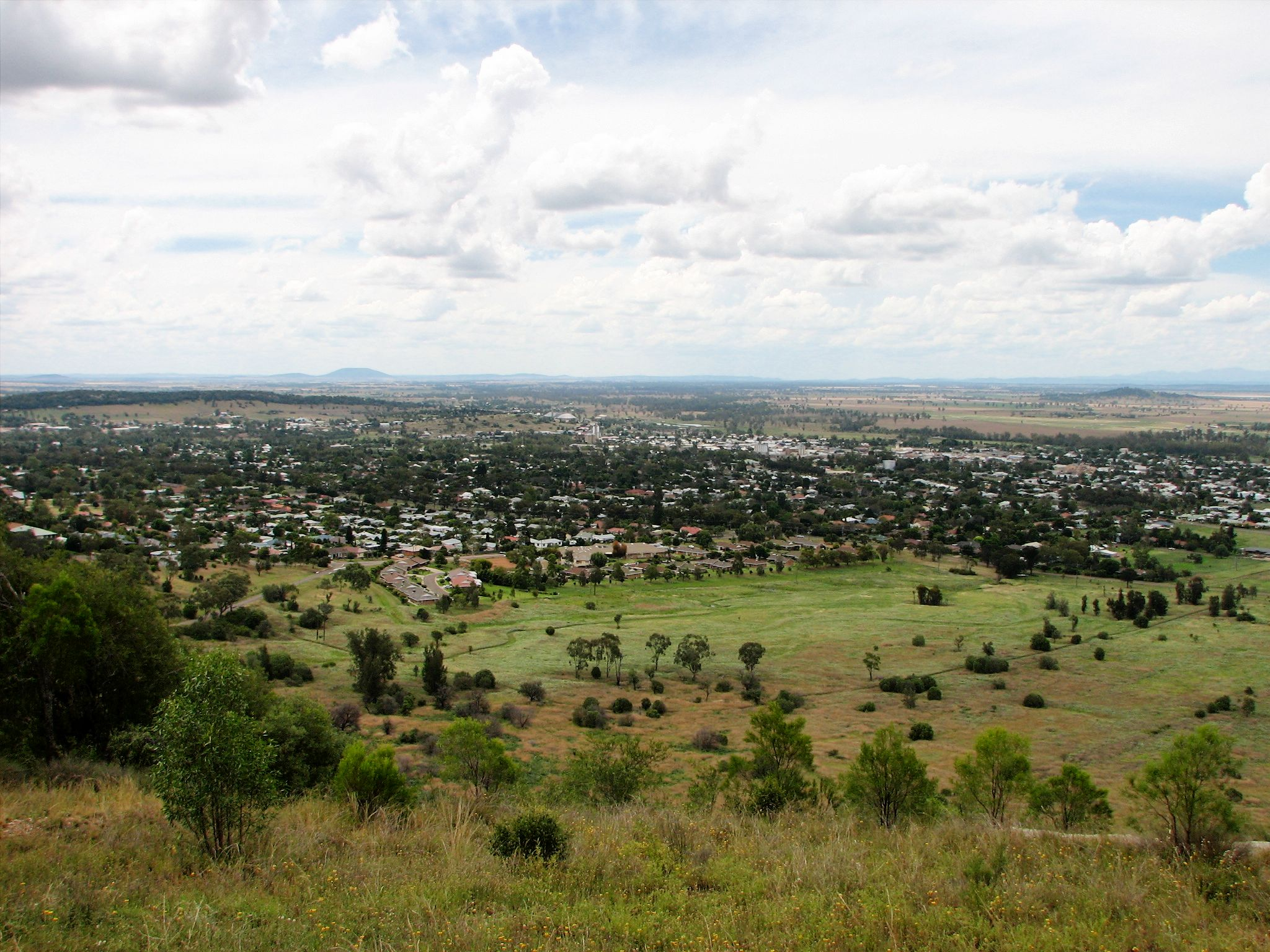
- Gunnedah viewed from Mount Porcupine

- Coordinates: 30°58′0″S 150°15′0″E
- Country: Australia
- State: New South Wales
- Region: North West Slopes
- LGA: Gunnedah Shire
- Location: 66 km (41 mi) W of Tamworth; 432 km (268 mi) NW of Sydney; 98 km (61 mi) SE of Narrabri; 113 km (70 mi) E of Coonabarabran
- Established: 1856

Government
  - State electorate: Tamworth
  - Federal division: Parkes
- Elevation: 264 m (866 ft)

Population
  - Total: 8,338 (2021 census)
- Postcode: 2380
- County: Pottinger
- Mean max temp: 24.6 °C (76.3 °F)
- Mean min temp: 12.2 °C (54.0 °F)
- Annual rainfall: 636.9 mm (25.07 in)
Localities around Gunnedah
	Boggabri	Manilla
Mullaley	Gunnedah	Carroll
	Curlewis

Gunnedah (/ˈɡʌnədɑː/) is a town in north-central New South Wales, Australia, and is the seat of the Gunnedah Shire local government area. In the 2021 census the town recorded a population of 8,338. Gunnedah is situated within the Liverpool Plains, a fertile agricultural region, with 80% of the surrounding shire area devoted to farming. The Namoi River flows west then north-west through the town providing water beneficial to agricultural operations in the area.

The Gunnedah area is a significant producer of cotton, coal, beef, lamb and pork, and cereal and oilseed grains. Gunnedah is also home to AgQuip, Australia's largest annual agricultural field day.

Gunnedah is located on the Oxley and Kamilaroi Highways providing convenient road links to much of the northern sector of the state including to the regional centre Tamworth, 75 kilometres (47 mi) distant. The town has a station on the Mungindi railway line and is served by the daily NSW TrainLink Xplorer passenger service to and from Sydney and Moree.

It claims the title of being the "Koala Capital of World", although recently there have been concerns over the health of the local koala population and the impacts of climate change on koala habitat.

== History ==
Gunnedah and the surrounding areas were originally inhabited by Aboriginal Australians speaking the Kamilaroi (Gamilaraay) language. The name of the town in Kamilaroi means "Place of White Stones". The Red Chief Local Aboriginal Land Council, established in 1984 under the Aboriginal Land Rights Act 1983 (NSW), represents the Aboriginal community in the Gunnedah area as part of the NSW Aboriginal Land Council network. In 1818, English surveyor general John Oxley traversed the district, for which a monument pays tribute to him at the base of Mullaley Mountain. The area now occupied by the town was settled by European sheep farmers in 1833 or 1834. With settlement in the area focused on wool production, Gunnedah was initially known as 'The Woolshed' until taking its name from the local Indigenous people who called themselves the Gunn-e-darr, the most famous of whom was Cumbo Gunnerah.

Coal was discovered on Black Jack Hill in 1877. By 1891, 6,000 tons of coal had been raised from shafts. The Gunnedah Colliery Company was registered in May 1899 and by 22 June a private railway some 5.7 kilometres (3.5 mi) in length had been completed from the railway station to their mine. In September 1957, the Government Railway took over the working of the line.

Dorothea Mackellar wrote her famous poem My Country (popularly known as I Love a Sunburnt Country) about her family's farm near Gunnedah. This is remembered by the annual Dorothea Mackellar Poetry Awards for school students held in Gunnedah.

In early 2012, Gunnedah experienced a mining boom resulting in rental properties being leased by mining companies for up to $1,350 per week.

== Heritage listings ==
Gunnedah has a number of heritage-listed sites, including:

- Werris Creek-Moree railway: Gunnedah railway station
- Gunnedah Leather Processors

== Population ==
According to the 2016 census of Population, there are 9,726 people in Gunnedah.

- Aboriginal and Torres Strait Islander people made up 13.7% of the population.
- 86.2% of people were born in Australia and 90.2% of people only spoke English at home.
- The most common responses for religion were Anglican 28.8%, Catholic 27.3% and No Religion 20.3%.

== Sports ==
The most popular sport in Gunnedah by a wide margin is Rugby league. The local team, the Gunnedah Bulldogs, play out of Kitchener Park. They compete in the Group 4 Rugby League competition, in which they have won seven premierships.

Other sports teams include the Gunnedah AFL Bulldogs competing in AFL North West NSW, Gunnedah Red Devils RUFC competing in the Central Northern Rugby Union and Gunnedah FC competing in the Northern Inland Football.

== Geography ==
Gunnedah Shire is situated 264 metres (866 ft) above sea level on the Liverpool Plains in the Namoi River valley. It is very flat; the tallest hills are 400 to 500 metres (1,300 to 1,600 ft) above sea level. The climate is hot in summer, mild in winter and dry, although rainstorms in catchment areas occasionally cause flooding of the Namoi River. Major floods cut transport links to the town, briefly isolating it from the outside world. The town is located on a rich coal seam and within the northern New South Wales wheat belt.

The Gunnedah area is noted for its abundance of native wildlife, including kangaroos, echidnas and koalas. Koalas can often be found in trees within the town, as well as in the surrounding countryside with the help of signs placed by the local tourist centre. The koala population is considered to be the largest koala colony in the state, west of the Great Dividing Range.

== Climate ==
Gunnedah has a textbook subtropical climate with characteristics of a hot semi-arid climate (BSh), with temperatures regularly exceeding 40 °C in summer and dropping below 0 °C in winter. This is due to the town's far inland location on the North West Slopes. Its average annual rainfall is 632.9 mm (24.9 in), which is spread throughout the year, however severe thunderstorms in the summer months often cause heavy downpours which boost rainfall totals.

The highest daily maximum temperature recorded was 48.7 °C (119.7 °F) on 24 January 1882, while the lowest daily maximum temperature recorded was 4.4 °C (39.9 °F) on 4 August 1921. Snow is very rare, with the most recent occurrence in 1984.

Climate data for Gunnedah Pool (1876–2011); 285 m AMSL; 30.98° S, 150.25° E
Month	Jan	Feb	Mar	Apr	May	Jun	Jul	Aug	Sep	Oct	Nov	Dec	Year
Record high °C (°F)	48.7 (119.7)	44.4 (111.9)	45.0 (113.0)	37.2 (99.0)	34.4 (93.9)	30.4 (86.7)	26.7 (80.1)	31.7 (89.1)	35.4 (95.7)	40.0 (104.0)	43.3 (109.9)	46.1 (115.0)	48.7 (119.7)
Mean daily maximum °C (°F)	34.0 (93.2)	32.9 (91.2)	30.7 (87.3)	26.4 (79.5)	21.3 (70.3)	17.6 (63.7)	16.9 (62.4)	18.9 (66.0)	22.8 (73.0)	26.7 (80.1)	30.3 (86.5)	32.9 (91.2)	26.0 (78.7)
Mean daily minimum °C (°F)	18.4 (65.1)	18.1 (64.6)	15.8 (60.4)	11.4 (52.5)	7.1 (44.8)	4.3 (39.7)	3.0 (37.4)	4.2 (39.6)	7.0 (44.6)	10.8 (51.4)	14.2 (57.6)	16.8 (62.2)	10.9 (51.7)
Record low °C (°F)	2.2 (36.0)	3.3 (37.9)	−1.0 (30.2)	−3.9 (25.0)	−5.3 (22.5)	−8.6 (16.5)	−8.3 (17.1)	−7.5 (18.5)	−6.7 (19.9)	−2.2 (28.0)	0.6 (33.1)	1.1 (34.0)	−8.6 (16.5)
Average rainfall mm (inches)	70.7 (2.78)	65.4 (2.57)	48.9 (1.93)	36.6 (1.44)	42.0 (1.65)	44.0 (1.73)	41.5 (1.63)	40.9 (1.61)	40.2 (1.58)	54.2 (2.13)	61.4 (2.42)	69.6 (2.74)	615.7 (24.24)
Average rainy days (≥ 1.0 mm)	5.5	5.0	4.0	3.4	4.0	4.8	4.7	4.7	4.5	5.3	5.6	6.0	57.5
Average afternoon relative humidity (%)	43	45	44	46	51	55	53	48	44	43	40	40	46
Source: Australian Bureau of Meteorology; Gunnedah Pool

Climate data for Gunnedah Resource Centre (1948–2025); 307 m AMSL; 31.03° S, 150.27° E
Month	Jan	Feb	Mar	Apr	May	Jun	Jul	Aug	Sep	Oct	Nov	Dec	Year
Record high °C (°F)	45.9 (114.6)	45.6 (114.1)	41.5 (106.7)	35.8 (96.4)	28.8 (83.8)	24.7 (76.5)	24.6 (76.3)	31.2 (88.2)	35.0 (95.0)	39.1 (102.4)	43.1 (109.6)	42.4 (108.3)	45.9 (114.6)
Mean daily maximum °C (°F)	32.2 (90.0)	31.3 (88.3)	29.2 (84.6)	25.3 (77.5)	20.4 (68.7)	16.9 (62.4)	16.2 (61.2)	18.0 (64.4)	21.6 (70.9)	25.3 (77.5)	28.6 (83.5)	31.2 (88.2)	24.7 (76.4)
Mean daily minimum °C (°F)	19.0 (66.2)	18.7 (65.7)	16.7 (62.1)	12.9 (55.2)	8.7 (47.7)	6.1 (43.0)	4.8 (40.6)	5.8 (42.4)	8.6 (47.5)	12.2 (54.0)	15.2 (59.4)	17.6 (63.7)	12.2 (54.0)
Record low °C (°F)	8.5 (47.3)	8.9 (48.0)	4.1 (39.4)	2.4 (36.3)	−1.2 (29.8)	−2.9 (26.8)	−3.6 (25.5)	−2.6 (27.3)	−0.3 (31.5)	1.5 (34.7)	3.3 (37.9)	5.3 (41.5)	−3.6 (25.5)
Average rainfall mm (inches)	82.2 (3.24)	69.9 (2.75)	44.3 (1.74)	37.8 (1.49)	43.3 (1.70)	40.3 (1.59)	41.2 (1.62)	35.3 (1.39)	41.2 (1.62)	57.1 (2.25)	67.8 (2.67)	70.7 (2.78)	632.9 (24.92)
Average rainy days (≥ 1.0 mm)	6.0	5.2	4.2	3.4	4.2	4.6	4.8	4.5	4.6	5.9	6.1	6.5	60
Source: Bureau of Meteorology

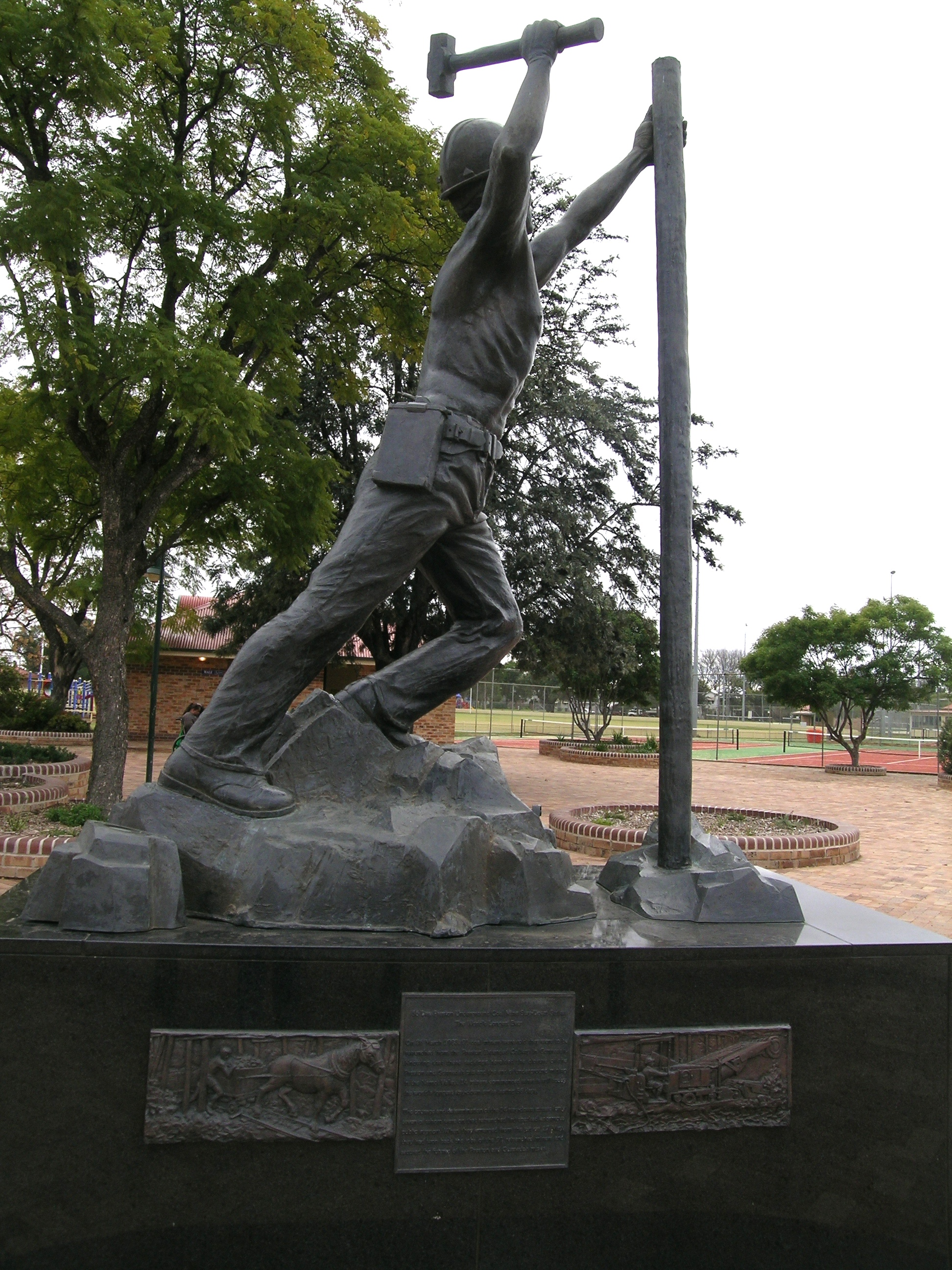
Monument to miners who have lost their lives, Gunnedah, NSW

== Education ==
Gunnedah has three secondary schools: Gunnedah High School, Carinya Christian School and St Mary's College. There are three government (Gunnedah Public School, Gunnedah South Public School, and G.S. Kidd Memorial School) and two non-government (St Xavier's Catholic School and Carinya Christian School) primary schools. A campus of the New England Institute of TAFE is also located within the town.

== Media ==
Local media include the Gunnedah Times and Namoi Valley Independent newspapers and the radio stations 2MO and 2GGG. The Namoi Valley Independent, published by Australian Community Media, switched to a digital-only newspaper model in 2020. The Gunnedah Times started as a print newspaper in November 2020 and is published by the Dunnet family, of Narrabri, who also publishes the bi-weekly The Courier newspaper in Narrabri.

Radio stations that broadcast to Gunnedah are ABC New England North West, 2YOU FM and the 2MO began broadcasting in 1930 and was only the fourth Radio Licence issued in Australia, being the first station established in Australia outside a capital city.

Network television that is broadcast in Gunnedah are:

- Seven (formerly branded as Prime7), 7two, 7mate, 7flix, 7Bravo – Seven Network owned and operated station channels.
- Nine (NBN), 9Go!, 9Gem, 9Life – Nine Network affiliated channels, owned by WIN Corporation.
- 10, 10 Drama, 10 Comedy – Network 10 owned and operated station channels.
- ABC, ABC Family, ABC Kids, ABC Entertains and ABC News, part of the Australian Broadcasting Corporation.
- Special Broadcasting Service, SBS, SBS2, SBS Food, SBS WorldWatch, SBS World Movies and NITV.

Subscription Television services are provided by Foxtel.

== Transport ==
The Oxley Highway and the Kamilaroi Highway both pass through Gunnedah, for a short distance, concurrently. The Oxley Highway leads to Tamworth in the east and Coonabarabran to the west. The Kamilaroi Highway leads to Quirindi to the south-east and Boggabri to the north-west.

=== Railway station ===
Gunnedah railway station is situated on the Mungindi railway line, 475 kilometres (295 mi) from Sydney. The station, opened in 1879, consists of a substantial station building on a single side platform, a passing loop and small goods yard. There are also sidings serving an adjacent flour mill. To the west of the station there are extensive sidings serving grain silos and loop sidings serving coal loading facilities. For a brief three-year period after the railway arrived in Gunnedah it was the railhead until construction was completed to Boggabri and then to Narrabri South Junction in 1882. Currently a single daily Xplorer diesel railmotor operating between Sydney and Moree serves the station.

== Notable Gunnedahians ==
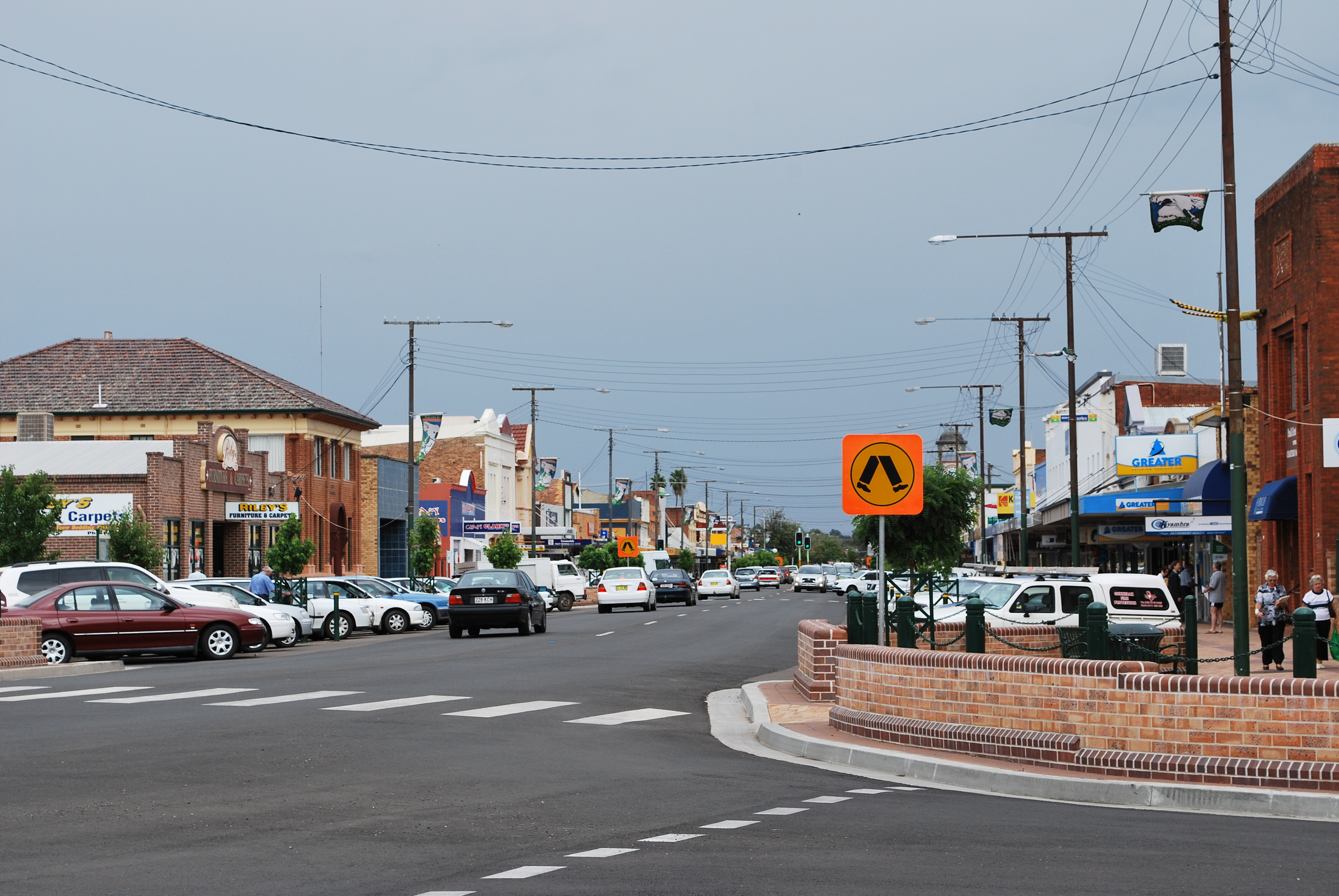
Main street, 2008

- Tommy and Phil Emmanuel – Award winning guitarists
- Leanne Castley – Member of the ACT Legislative Assembly
- Sara Carrigan – Olympic Gold Medallist
- Gordon Bray – Sports Commentator
- John "Dallas" Donnelly – rugby league player
- Tom Gleeson – Comedian
- Ben Gunter – Japanese Rugby International
- Lindsay Johnston – rugby league player
- Miranda Kerr – model
- Katrina Burgoyne – Country music singer
- Michael Kilborn – cricketer and cardiologist
- Dorothea Mackellar – poet
- Sam Naismith – Australian rules footballer
- Gillian Campbell – Olympic rower
- Harry McLaughlin-Phillips – Rugby Player, Queensland Reds
- John O'Neill – rugby league player
- Erica Packer – model and singer, ex-wife of James Packer.
- Angus Roberts – rugby union player
- Ben Smith – rugby league player
- Pat Studdy-Clift – author
- Ron Turner – rugby league player
- James Wynne – rugby league player
- Sergeant Leonard Siffleet – WWII Commando
- Harry Wilson – Wallabies Captain, Rugby Union player, Queensland Reds.
- Maureen Flood – regional superior and deputy superior general of the Servants of the Blessed Sacrament Order. Radio host in Rome
- Greg Hickman – (Horse Racing) Group 1 winning Horse Trainer Sydney Trained Pierata Eleven Eleven

== See also ==
- Cumbo Gunnerah
- Gunnedah Shire Council
