= List of Local Aboriginal Land Councils in New South Wales =

The following is a list of Local Aboriginal Land Councils (LALCs) in New South Wales, grouped by the nine voting regions used by the New South Wales Aboriginal Land Council (NSWALC). NSWALC describes a network of 121 LALCs divided into nine regions for representation and governance purposes. Contact addresses and telephone numbers are primarily drawn from NSWALC's directory and from individual LALC websites and their entries on the Australian Charities and Not-for-profits Commission (ACNC) charity register.

In its 2022–23 annual report, NSWALC identified Stuart Island, Ivanhoe, Wanaaring and Winbar as non-operational at 30 June 2023.

== Regional summary ==
Number of councils listed by region
NSWALC region	Councils listed
Central	9
Mid North Coast	12
North Coast	13
North Western	16
Northern	14
South Coast	13
Sydney/Newcastle	11
Western	12
Wiradjuri	21
Total	121

== Central ==
Local Aboriginal Land Councils in the Central region
Local Aboriginal Land Council	Street address	Postal address	Phone	Fax	Website / social media	Email (NSWALC form)	ACNC charity profile
Dhubu-Gu	Cnr Wingewarra & Darling Street; Dubbo NSW 2830	PO Box 1565; DUBBO NSW 2830	02 6884 5276	02 6884 3441		Email form	ACNC profile
Gilgandra	114 Warren Road; Gilgandra NSW 2827	PO Box 163; GILGANDRA NSW 2827	02 6847 1477	02 6847 1461		Email form	ACNC profile
Mudgee	Unit 1/1 Industrial Avenue; Mudgee NSW 2850	PO Box 1098; MUDGEE NSW 2850	02 6372 3511	02 6372 3522	Mudgee LALC website	Email form	ACNC profile
Narromine	13 Burroway Street; Narromine NSW 2821		02 6889 2340	02 6889 2205		Email form	ACNC profile
Nyngan	102 Pangee Street; Nyngan NSW 2825	PO Box 43; NYNGAN NSW 2825	02 6832 2639	02 6832 2878		Email form	ACNC profile
Trangie	48 Dandaloo Street; Trangie NSW 2823	PO Box 106; TRANGIE NSW 2823	02 6888 7661	02 6888 7470	Trangie LALC website	Email form	ACNC profile
Warren	164 Dubbo Street; Warren NSW 2824	PO Box 321; WARREN NSW 2824	02 6847 4599	02 6847 4427		Email form	ACNC profile
Weilwan	Cnr Kirban & Yalcogrin Street; Gulargambone NSW 2828	PO Box 102; GULARGAMBONE NSW 2828	0499 006 425			Email form	ACNC profile
Wellington	163 Simpson Street; Wellington NSW 2820	PO Box 90; WELLINGTON NSW 2820	02 6845 2229			Email form	ACNC profile

== Mid North Coast ==
Local Aboriginal Land Councils in the Mid North Coast region
Local Aboriginal Land Council	Street address	Postal address	Phone	Fax	Website / social media	Email (NSWALC form)	ACNC charity profile
Birpai	14 Aston Street; Port Macquarie NSW 2444	PO Box 876; PORT MACQUARIE NSW 2444	02 6584 9066	02 6583 8172		Email form	ACNC profile
Bowraville	66 High Street; Bowraville NSW 2449	PO Box 90; BOWRAVILLE NSW 2449	02 6564 7812	02 6564 7843		Email form	ACNC profile
Bunyah	208 High Street; Wauchope NSW 2446	PO Box 287; WAUCHOPE NSW 2446	02 6585 3882	02 6585 2550		Email form	ACNC profile
Coffs Harbour	Cnr Pacific Highway & Arthur Street; Coffs Harbour NSW 2450	PO Box 6150; COFFS HARBOUR NSW 2450	02 6652 8740	02 6652 5923	Coffs Harbour LALC website	Email form	ACNC profile
Forster	10 Breckenridge Street; Forster NSW 2428	PO Box 384; FORSTER NSW 2428	02 6555 5411	02 6555 6757		Email form	ACNC profile
Karuah	16 Mustons Road; Karuah NSW 2324	PO Box 30; KARUAH NSW 2324	02 4997 5733	02 4997 5750		Email form	ACNC profile
Kempsey	Suite 8, 1 John Street; Kempsey NSW 2440	PO Box 540; KEMPSEY NSW 2440	02 6562 8688	02 6563 1293		Email form	ACNC profile
Nambucca Heads	159A Mann Street; Nambucca Heads NSW 2448	PO Box 358; NAMBUCCA HEADS NSW 2448	02 6568 9281	02 6568 9161	Nambucca Heads LALC website	Email form	ACNC profile
Purfleet/Taree	1–3 Old Pacific Highway; Taree NSW 2430	PO Box 346; TAREE NSW 2430	02 6552 4106	02 6551 0847		Email form	ACNC profile
Stuart Island							
Thunggutti	Thungutti Village; Bellbrook NSW 2440	Post Office; BELLBROOK NSW 2440	02 6567 2050	02 6567 2169		Email form	ACNC profile
Unkya	2/23 Cooper Street; Macksville NSW 2447		02 6568 2786		Unkya LALC website	Email form	ACNC profile

== North Coast ==
Local Aboriginal Land Councils in the North Coast region
Local Aboriginal Land Council	Street address	Postal address	Phone	Fax	Website / social media	Email (NSWALC form)	ACNC charity profile
Baryulgil Square	Baryulgil Square Community; Baryulgil NSW 2460	PO Box 1383; BARYULGIL VIA GRAFTON NSW 2460	02 6647 2131	02 6647 2131		Email form	ACNC profile
Birrigan Gargle	30 Coldstream Street; Yamba NSW 2464	PO Box 62; YAMBA NSW 2464	02 6645 8158	02 6646 1672		Email form	ACNC profile
Bogal	Box Ridge Community; Coraki NSW 2471	PO Box 72; CORAKI NSW 2471	02 6683 2625	02 6683 2698		Email form	ACNC profile
Casino-Boolangle	93 Barker Street; Casino NSW 2470	PO Box 1047; CASINO NSW 2470	02 6662 6286	02 6662 6290		Email form	ACNC profile
Grafton Ngerrie	50 Wharf Street; South Grafton NSW 2460	PO Box 314; SOUTH GRAFTON NSW 2460	02 6642 6020	02 6642 6994	Grafton Ngerrie website	Email form	ACNC profile
Gugin Gudduba	Shop 59 Summerland Way; Kyogle NSW 2474	PO Box 597; KYOGLE NSW 2474	02 6632 1056	02 6632 2324		Email form	ACNC profile
Jali	129 Tamar Street; Ballina NSW 2478	PO Box 1677; BALLINA NSW 2478	02 6686 7055	02 6686 8255		Email form	ACNC profile
Jana Ngalee	Malabugilmah Village; NSW 2460	PO Box 1398; GRAFTON NSW 2460	02 6647 2209	02 6647 2119		Email form	ACNC profile
Jubullum	Jubullum Street; Jubullum Village NSW 2469	PO Box 25; TABULAM NSW 2469	02 6666 1337	02 6666 1386		Email form	ACNC profile
Muli Muli	Muli Muli Crescent; Muli Muli NSW 2476	PO Box 68; WOODENBONG NSW 2476	02 6635 1487	02 6635 1498		Email form	ACNC profile
Ngulingah	53 Conway Street; Lismore NSW 2480	PO Box 981; LISMORE NSW 2480	02 6621 5541	02 6621 5068		Email form	ACNC profile
Tweed/Byron	Unit 21/25 Ourimbah Road; South Tweed Heads NSW 2486	PO Box 6967; SOUTH TWEED HEADS NSW 2486	07 5536 1763	07 5536 9832	Tweed/Byron LALC website	Email form	ACNC profile
Yaegl	Community Hall, Jubilee Street, Hillcrest; Maclean NSW 2463	PO Box 216; MACLEAN NSW 2463	02 6614 6718	02 6645 3754		Email form	ACNC profile

== North Western ==
Local Aboriginal Land Councils in the North Western region
Local Aboriginal Land Council	Street address	Postal address	Phone	Fax	Website / social media	Email (NSWALC form)	ACNC charity profile
Baradine	17 Wellington Street; Baradine NSW 2396	PO Box 61; BARADINE NSW 2396	02 6843 1171	02 6843 1151		Email form	ACNC profile
Brewarrina	10 Sandon Street; Brewarrina NSW 2839	PO Box 105; BREWARRINA NSW 2839	02 6839 2273			Email form	ACNC profile
Collarenebri	Cnr Herbert & Wilson Streets; Collarenebri NSW 2833	PO Box 122; COLLARENEBRI NSW 2833	02 6756 2060			Email form	ACNC profile
Coonamble	16 Castlereagh Street; Coonamble NSW 2829	PO Box 385; COONAMBLE NSW 2829	02 6822 2100	02 6822 2554		Email form	ACNC profile
Goodooga	Warraweena Street; Goodooga NSW 2831	PO Box 78; GOODOOGA NSW 2831	0498 563 006			Email form	ACNC profile
Lightning Ridge	12 Pandora Street; Lightning Ridge NSW 2834	PO Box 903; LIGHTNING RIDGE NSW 2834	02 6829 0105	02 6829 0274		Email form	ACNC profile
Moree	51 Auburn Street; Moree NSW 2400	PO Box 924; MOREE NSW 2400	02 6751 1127	02 6751 1116		Email form	ACNC profile
Mungindi	47 Goondiwindi Street; Mungindi NSW 2406	PO Box 26; MUNGINDI NSW 2406	02 6753 2113			Email form	ACNC profile
Murrawari	17 Fourth Avenue; Enngonia NSW 2840	17 Fourth Avenue; ENNGONIA NSW 2840	02 6874 7888	02 6874 7259		Email form	ACNC profile
Narrabri	96 Barwan Street; Narrabri NSW 2390	96 Barwan Street; NARRABRI NSW 2390	02 6792 4228	02 6792 4258		Email form	ACNC profile
Nulla Nulla	22 Sturt Street; Bourke NSW 2840	PO Box 79; BOURKE NSW 2840	02 6872 4574	02 6872 1282		Email form	ACNC profile
Pilliga	4 Dangar Street; Pilliga NSW 2388	PO Box 42; PILLIGA NSW 2388	02 6796 4310	02 6796 4307		Email form	ACNC profile
Toomelah	Toomelah Reserve; Toomelah NSW 2409	PO Box 261; BOGGABILLA NSW 2409	07 4676 2348	07 4676 2555		Email form	ACNC profile
Walgett	87 Fox Street; Walgett NSW 2832	PO Box 459; WALGETT NSW 2832	02 6828 2426	02 6828 2426		Email form	ACNC profile
Wee Waa	63–65 Rose Street; Wee Waa NSW 2388	PO Box 106; WEE WAA NSW 2388	02 6795 3735	02 6795 3731		Email form	ACNC profile
Weilmoringle	15A Brown Street; Weilmoringle NSW 2839	PO Box 171; BREWARRINA NSW 2839	02 6874 4973	02 6874 4970		Email form	ACNC profile

== Northern ==
Local Aboriginal Land Councils in the Northern region
Local Aboriginal Land Council	Street address	Postal address	Phone	Fax	Website / social media	Email (NSWALC form)	ACNC charity profile
Amaroo	36N Derby Street; Walcha NSW 2354	PO Box 248; WALCHA NSW 2354	02 6777 1100	02 6777 2490		Email form	ACNC profile
Anaiwan	7 Opal Street; Inverell NSW 2360	PO Box 651; INVERELL NSW 2360	02 6723 3022	02 6723 3023		Email form	ACNC profile
Armidale	90 Beardy Street; Armidale NSW 2350	PO Box 1837; ARMIDALE NSW 2350	02 6772 2447	02 6772 6048		Email form	ACNC entry
Coonabarabran	2/30 John Street; Coonabarabran NSW 2357	PO Box 110; COONABARABRAN NSW 2357	02 6842 3137	02 6842 2840		Email form	ACNC profile
Dorrigo Plateau	24 Vine Street; Dorrigo NSW 2453	PO Box 55; DORRIGO NSW 2453	02 6657 2606	02 6657 2607		Email form	ACNC profile
Glen Innes	181 Lang Street; Glen Innes NSW 2370	PO Box 157; GLEN INNES NSW 2370	02 6732 1150	02 6732 6413		Email form	ACNC profile
Guyra	187 Falconer Street; Guyra NSW 2365	PO Box 215; GUYRA NSW 2365	02 6779 1803	02 6779 1649		Email form	ACNC profile
Kwiambal (formerly Ashford)	25 Albury Street; Ashford NSW 2361	PO Box 66; ASHFORD NSW 2361	02 6725 4411	02 6725 4422		Email form	ACNC profile
Moombahlene	299 Rouse Street; Tenterfield NSW 2372	PO Box 70; TENTERFIELD NSW 2372	02 6736 3219	02 6736 1486	Moombahlene website	Email form	ACNC profile
Nungaroo	143 Loder Street; Quirindi NSW 2343	PO Box 28; QUIRINDI NSW 2343	02 6746 2356			Email form	ACNC profile
Red Chief	26 Chandos Street; Gunnedah NSW 2380	PO Box 745; GUNNEDAH NSW	02 6742 3602	02 6742 3815	Red Chief LALC on Facebook	Email form	ACNC profile
Tamworth	123 Marius Street; Tamworth NSW 2340	PO Box 57; TAMWORTH NSW 2340	02 6766 9028	02 6766 9036	Tamworth LALC website	Email form	ACNC profile
Walhallow	1 Hill Street; Caroona NSW 2343	PO Box 3 CAROONA NSW 2343	0427 520 680		Walhallow LALC website	Email form	ACNC profile
Wanaruah	17–19 Maitland Street; Muswellbrook NSW 2333	PO Box 127; MUSWELLBROOK NSW 2333	02 6543 1288	02 6542 5377	Wanaruah LALC website	Email form	ACNC profile

== South Coast ==
Local Aboriginal Land Councils in the South Coast region
Local Aboriginal Land Council	Street address	Postal address	Phone	Fax	Website / social media	Email (NSWALC form)	ACNC charity profile
Batemans Bay	Unit 3/34 D Orient Street; Batemans Bay NSW 2536	PO Box 542; BATEMANS BAY NSW 2536	02 4472 7390	02 4472 8622		Email form	ACNC profile
Bega	104 Gipps Street; Bega NSW 2550	PO Box 11; BEGA NSW 2550	02 6492 3950	02 6492 4087	Bega LALC on Facebook	Email form	ACNC profile
Bodalla	68 Princes Highway; Bodalla NSW 2545	68 Princes Highway; BODALLA NSW 2545	02 4473 5404	02 4473 5215		Email form	ACNC profile
Cobowra	193 Vulcan Street; Moruya NSW 2537	PO Box 204; MORUYA NSW 2537	02 4474 4188			Email form	ACNC profile
Eden	4381 Princes Highway; Broadwater NSW 2549	PO Box 199; EDEN NSW 2551	02 6495 7177	02 6495 7433		Email form	ACNC profile
Illawarra	Level 2, 38–40 Young Street; Wollongong NSW 2500	PO Box 1306; WOLLONGONG BC NSW 2500	02 4226 3338	02 4226 3360	Illawarra LALC website	Email form	ACNC profile
Jerrinja	Corner Osbourne Parade; Orient Point NSW 2540	PO Box 167; CULBURRA BEACH NSW 2540	02 4447 5669	02 4447 4230	Jerrinja LALC website	Email form	ACNC profile
Merrimans	13 Umbarra Road; Wallaga Lake NSW 2546	PO Box 13; WALLAGA LAKE NSW 2546	02 4473 7288	02 4473 7478		Email form	ACNC profile
Mogo	32 Sydney Street; Mogo NSW 2536		02 4474 5229	02 4474 5219	Mogo LALC website	Email form	ACNC profile
Ngambri	70 Monaro Street; Queanbeyan NSW 2620	PO Box 150; QUEANBEYAN NSW 2620	02 6297 4152	02 6299 3941		Email form	ACNC profile
Nowra	59 Beinda Street; Bomaderry NSW 2541	PO Box 2049; BOMADERRY NSW 2541	02 4423 3163; 0455 053 300	02 4423 0083		Email form	ACNC profile
Ulladulla	66 Deering Street; Ulladulla NSW 2539	PO Box 123; ULLADULLA NSW 2539	02 4455 5880	02 4455 5967		Email form	ACNC profile
Wagonga	16 Canty Street; Narooma NSW 2546	PO Box 78; NAROOMA NSW 2546	02 4476 1144	02 4476 3764	Wagonga LALC website	Email form	ACNC profile

== Sydney/Newcastle ==
Local Aboriginal Land Councils in the Sydney/Newcastle region
Local Aboriginal Land Council	Street address	Postal address	Phone	Fax	Website / social media	Email (NSWALC form)	ACNC charity profile
Awabakal	127 Maitland Road; Islington NSW 2296	PO Box 101; ISLINGTON NSW 2296	02 4965 4532	02 4965 4531	Awabakal LALC website	Email form	ACNC profile
Bahtabah	44 Pacific Highway; Blacksmiths NSW 2281	PO Box 3018; BLACKSMITHS NSW 2281	02 4971 4800	02 4971 4671		Email form	ACNC profile
Biraban	95 Main Road; Speers Point NSW 2284	PO Box 143; BOOLAROO NSW 2284	02 4950 4806	02 4359 3574	Biraban LALC website	Email form	ACNC profile
Darkinjung	168 Pacific Highway; Watanobbi NSW 2259	PO Box 401; WYONG NSW 2259	02 4351 2930	02 4351 2946	Darkinjung LALC website	Email form	ACNC profile
Deerubbin	73A O'Connell Street (Cnr Dunlop & New Streets); Parramatta NSW 2150	PO Box 2341; NORTH PARRAMATTA NSW 1750	02 4724 5600	02 4722 9713	Deerubbin LALC website	Email form	ACNC profile
Gandangara	64 Macquarie Street; Liverpool NSW 2170	PO Box 1038; LIVERPOOL BC NSW 1871	02 9602 5280	02 9602 2741	Gandangara LALC website	Email form	ACNC profile
La Perouse	Cnr Elaroo Avenue & Yarra Road; La Perouse NSW 2036	PO Box 365; MATRAVILLE NSW 2036	02 9311 4282	02 9661 7423	La Perouse LALC website	Email form	ACNC profile
Metropolitan	Level 2, 150 Elizabeth Street; Sydney NSW 2000	PO Box 1103; STRAWBERRY HILLS NSW 2012	02 8394 9666	02 8394 9733	Metropolitan LALC website	Email form	ACNC profile
Mindaribba	1A Chelmsford Drive; Metford NSW 2323	PO Box 401; EAST MAITLAND NSW 2323	02 4015 7000			Email form	ACNC profile
Tharawal	220 West Parade; Couridjah NSW 2571	PO Box 245; THIRLMERE NSW 2572	02 4681 0059	02 4683 1375	Tharawal LALC website	Email form	ACNC profile
Worimi	2163 Nelson Bay Road; Williamtown NSW 2318	PO Box 56; TANILBA BAY NSW 2319	02 4033 8800	02 4033 8899	Worimi LALC website	Email form	ACNC profile

== Western ==
Local Aboriginal Land Councils in the Western region
Local Aboriginal Land Council	Street address	Postal address	Phone	Fax	Website / social media	Email (NSWALC form)	ACNC charity profile
Balranald	200 Church Street; Balranald NSW 2715	PO Box 187; BALRANALD NSW 2715	03 5020 1932	03 5020 1940		Email form	ACNC profile
Broken Hill	84 Oxide Street; Broken Hill NSW 2880	PO Box 392; BROKEN HILL NSW 2880	08 8087 7310	08 8087 7708	Broken Hill LALC website	Email form	ACNC profile
Cobar	45 Linsley Street; Cobar NSW 2835	PO Box 410; COBAR NSW 2835	02 6836 1144	02 6836 1292		Email form	
Dareton	14 Merinee Road, New Merinee–Namatjira Avenue; Dareton NSW 2717	PO Box 7 DARETON NSW 2717	03 5027 4721	03 5027 4705		Email form	ACNC profile
Ivanhoe							
Menindee	21 Yartla Street; Menindee NSW 2879	PO Box 47; MENINDEE NSW 2879	08 8091 4541	08 8091 4500		Email form	ACNC profile
Mutawintji	183 Argent Street; Broken Hill NSW 2880	PO Box 296; BROKEN HILL NSW 2880	08 8087 7909			Email form	
Tibooburra	1 Briscoe Street; Tibooburra NSW 2880		08 8091 3435	08 8091 3446		Email form	ACNC profile
Wanaaring							
Wangaaypuwan	63 Burns Street; Hillston NSW 2675	PO Box 42; HILLSTON NSW 2675	0447 058 434			Email form	
Wilcannia	72 Woore Street; Wilcannia NSW 2836	PO Box 31; WILCANNIA NSW 2836	08 8091 5828			Email form	ACNC profile
Winbar							

== Wiradjuri ==
Local Aboriginal Land Councils in the Wiradjuri region
Local Aboriginal Land Council	Street address	Postal address	Phone	Fax	Website / social media	Email (NSWALC form)	ACNC charity profile
Albury & District	917 Chenery Street; Lavington NSW 2640	PO Box 22; LAVINGTON NSW 2640	02 6025 7075	02 6025 4340		Email form	ACNC profile
Bathurst	149 Russell Street; Bathurst NSW 2795	PO Box 1500; BATHURST NSW 2795	02 6332 6835	02 6332 3623		Email form	ACNC profile
Brungle - Tumut	55 Merrivale Street; Tumut NSW 2720	PO Box 684; TUMUT NSW 2720	02 6947 4518	02 6947 4501		Email form	ACNC profile
Condobolin	137 Bathurst Street; Condobolin NSW 2877	PO Box 114; CONDOBOLIN NSW 2877	02 6895 4418	02 6895 3729		Email form	ACNC profile
Cowra	124 Fishburn Street; Cowra NSW 2794		0400 398 557			Email form	ACNC profile
Cummeragunja	Tongala Road; Cummeragunja Village NSW 2731	PO Box 99; MOAMA NSW 2731	03 5869 3372	03 5869 3348		Email form	ACNC profile
Deniliquin	426 Wood Street; Deniliquin NSW 2710	PO Box 846; DENILIQUIN NSW 2710	03 5881 4891	03 5881 2852		Email form	ACNC profile
Griffith	5 Wiradjuri Place; Griffith NSW 2680	PO Box 8043; EAST GRIFFITH NSW 2680	02 6962 6711	02 6964 1477		Email form	ACNC profile
Hay	412 Belmore Street; Hay NSW 2711	PO Box 75; HAY NSW 2711	02 6993 2243	02 6993 2290		Email form	ACNC profile
Leeton & District	Shop 1/5 Belah Street; Leeton NSW 2705	PO Box 994; LEETON NSW 2705	02 6953 4344	02 6953 5248	Leeton & District LALC website	Email form	ACNC profile
Moama	52 Chanter Street; Moama NSW 2731	PO Box 354; MOAMA NSW 2731	03 5482 6071	03 5482 6085		Email form	ACNC profile
Murrin Bridge	39 Foster Street; Lake Cargelligo NSW 2672	PO Box 157; LAKE CARGELLIGO NSW 2672	02 6898 1119	02 6898 1158		Email form	ACNC profile
Narrandera	172 East Street; Narrandera NSW 2700	PO Box 544; NARRANDERA NSW 2700	02 6959 1823	02 6959 2811		Email form	ACNC profile
Onerwal	11 Adele Street; Yass NSW 2582	PO Box 644; YASS NSW 2582	02 6226 5349	02 6226 5348		Email form	ACNC profile
Orange	42 Dalton Street; Orange NSW 2800	PO Box 10; ORANGE NSW 2800	02 6361 4742	02 6361 9119	Orange LALC website	Email form	ACNC profile
Peak Hill	88 Caswell Street; Peak Hill NSW 2869	PO Box 63; PEAK HILL NSW 2869	02 6869 1726	02 6869 1455		Email form	ACNC profile
Pejar	80 Combermere Street; Goulburn NSW 2580	PO Box 289; GOULBURN NSW 2580	02 4822 3552			Email form	ACNC profile
Wagga Wagga	159 Docker Street; Wagga Wagga NSW 2650	PO Box 6289; WAGGA WAGGA NSW 2650	02 6921 4095	02 6921 7625		Email form	ACNC profile
Wamba Wamba	3 Moulamein Road; Swan Hill VIC 2735	PO Box 2011; SWAN HILL VIC 3585	03 5032 3113	03 5032 2934		Email form	ACNC profile
West Wyalong	76–78 Main Street; West Wyalong NSW 2671	PO Box 332; WEST WYALONG NSW 2671	02 6972 3493	02 6972 2070		Email form	ACNC profile
Young	247 Boorowa Street; Young NSW 2594		02 6382 5669	02 6382 2522		Email form	ACNC profile
