= Tamworth Local Aboriginal Land Council =

- Abbreviation: Tamworth LALC
- Formation: 2 February 1984
- Type: Local Aboriginal Land Council (NSW)
- Headquarters: 123 Marius Street, Tamworth, New South Wales, Australia
- Region served: Tamworth LALC boundary (includes Tamworth, Manilla, Barraba, Bendemeer)
- Chairperson: Daisy Cutmore
- Chief Executive Officer: Fiona Snape
- Website: www.tamworthlalc.com.au

Tamworth Local Aboriginal Land Council (Tamworth LALC) is a Local Aboriginal Land Council based in Tamworth, New South Wales, Australia, on Kamilaroi/Gomeroi Country. It was incorporated on 2 February 1984 under the Aboriginal Land Rights Act 1983 (NSW).

The council provides community housing, education and youth programs, cultural programs and land management services. Its programs include the Tamworth Opportunity Hub, the Yilaan.gaal Dhina/Fresh Footprints youth diversion model and the Walaaybaa Rangers.

== Governance and structure ==
Local Aboriginal Land Councils were established under the Aboriginal Land Rights Act 1983 (NSW) as part of a statutory land rights framework in New South Wales that includes mechanisms for Crown land claims and land acquisition by Aboriginal Land Councils. Tamworth LALC was incorporated on 2 February 1984 and over its operating period has acquired 15 residential properties, its office and 13 parcels of land.

The council is governed by an elected board, with elections held every four years. Chairperson Daisy Cutmore was identified by ABC News as a signatory to the Mara Ngali partnership agreement in 2025. Chief Executive Officer Fiona Snape is listed in the 2025 Tamworth Regional Council community directory.

== Functions and services ==
Under New South Wales law, Local Aboriginal Land Councils have defined objects and functions including land acquisition and dealing, actions relating to Aboriginal culture and heritage and community benefit activities.

The Tamworth Regional Council community directory describes Tamworth LALC's services as including housing management, land claims, community programs and confirmation of Aboriginality. The council's website provides additional detail on these services.

=== Housing ===
The 2025 Tamworth Regional Council community directory reports that the council manages residential housing stock. The council's website states that it owns rental properties and leases additional properties from the Aboriginal Housing Office with rental stock managed by Ray White.

== Land and assets ==
=== Trelawney Station ===
Trelawney Station, near Somerton in northern New South Wales, is a mixed-farming property with Peel River access used for agriculture, training, cultural events and community programs.

The property was returned to Traditional Owners in February 2019 following a five-year partnership with the Indigenous Land and Sea Corporation (ILSC). Its size has been reported as approximately 720–770 hectares across different sources.

An ILSC report describes infrastructure upgrades on the station in 2022–23 to support a farming enterprise and meet work health and safety requirements.

== Community programs ==
=== Opportunity Hub ===
The NSW Ombudsman's 2019 OCHRE review describes the Tamworth Opportunity Hub as operated by Tamworth LALC and governed by a consortium of partner organisations, within the broader NSW Government Opportunity Hubs initiative supporting Aboriginal young people's pathways from school to training and employment.

In supplementary evidence to a NSW Parliament committee (October 2025), Tamworth LALC reported participation levels and described employer and training-provider engagement activities, including events held on-Country at Trelawney Station.

=== Yilaan.gaal Dhina / Fresh Footprints ===
In evidence to a NSW Parliament committee (October 2025), Tamworth LALC described the development of the Yilaan.gaal Dhina/Fresh Footprints youth diversion model, including a "Tamworth Justice Collaboration" formed in 2023, a co-design process involving young people and early outcome indicators for a pilot cohort.

=== Walaaybaa Rangers ===
An Independent Pricing and Regulatory Tribunal (IPART) supporting expert report (December 2024) includes a case study on the Walaaybaa Rangers program, describing cultural burning, land management and regeneration work, junior ranger activity in schools and partnerships with government agencies including work around Chaffey Dam.

=== Bumbira Art & Culture Program ===
A National Indigenous Australians Agency (NIAA) grants report (covering July–December 2024) lists the Bumbira Arts and Culture Program as a Commonwealth-funded initiative delivered by Tamworth LALC. The council's website describes the program as supporting social and emotional wellbeing for women (aged 15 and over) through art, culture and connection to Country and community.

== Funding and finances ==
Tamworth LALC is registered on the Australian Charities and Not-for-profits Commission (ACNC) Charity Register. Audited financial statements filed via the ACNC report consolidated total revenue of approximately A$3.9 million and net assets of approximately A$8.1 million for the financial year ended 30 June 2024.

An NIAA grants report (covering July–December 2024) lists Tamworth LALC as a recipient for program-specific funding including Bounce Back Bounce Between, Bumbira Arts and Culture and Post-School Support Officer.

== Notable events ==
=== Mara Ngali Closing the Gap partnership ===
In May 2025, Tamworth Regional Council and Tamworth Aboriginal Community Controlled Organisations signed a "Mara Ngali" partnership agreement. ABC News and an NSW Government news release each described the agreement as the first of its kind in Australia to embed Closing the Gap commitments at a local-government level.

=== Aboriginal Cultural Showcase ===
Tamworth LALC has been involved in the delivery of the Aboriginal Cultural Showcase during the Tamworth Country Music Festival. NSWALC reported on the 2017 event featuring Aboriginal and Torres Strait Islander performers and SBS NITV has reported on the showcase as a platform for First Nations artists in later years.

== Affiliations ==
Tamworth LALC is part of the New South Wales Aboriginal Land Council (NSWALC) network and appears in NSWALC's directory under the Northern region grouping.

== See also ==
- Aboriginal Land Rights Act 1983
- New South Wales Aboriginal Land Council
- Closing the Gap
- Tamworth, New South Wales
