= Kempsey Local Aboriginal Land Council =

- Type: Local Aboriginal Land Council (NSW)
- Legal status: Statutory body corporate
- Headquarters: Kempsey, New South Wales, Australia
- Region served: Macleay Valley, New South Wales

Kempsey Local Aboriginal Land Council (KLALC) is a Local Aboriginal Land Council based in Kempsey, New South Wales, Australia, in the Macleay Valley on Dunghutti Country. It forms part of the network of Aboriginal land councils established under the Aboriginal Land Rights Act 1983 (NSW).

== Kinchela Aboriginal Boys' Training Home ==
The council owns the former Kinchela Aboriginal Boys' Training Home at Kinchela, a site used between 1924 and 1970 by the Aborigines Protection Board and its successor, the Aborigines Welfare Board, to house Aboriginal boys forcibly removed from their families. The home is one of the institutions associated with the Stolen Generations. The site was added to the New South Wales State Heritage Register in 2012 and listed as an Aboriginal Place under the National Parks and Wildlife Act 1974 (NSW) in 2013.

In 2022, the site was listed on the World Monuments Fund's biennial World Monuments Watch as one of 25 heritage sites of worldwide significance, the first Stolen Generations institution to be included on the list.

The council works in partnership with the survivor-led Kinchela Boys Home Aboriginal Corporation (KBHAC) on the conservation and interpretation of the site. In 2022, the NSW Government funded repair and maintenance works at the property through its Keeping Places program for former Aboriginal children's homes, carried out with the involvement of both KBHAC and the council as landowner.

In 2023, a report commissioned at the request of survivors and prepared for Aboriginal Affairs NSW identified several sites on the grounds as potential unmarked or clandestine burials using ground-penetrating radar. KBHAC called for further investigation and excavation. NITV later reported that the NSW Government stated it had no authority to proceed with excavation works at the site without permission from the council as the current landowner.

== Stuarts Point land claims agreement ==
In May 2021, the council, the NSW Aboriginal Land Council and Kempsey Shire Council signed a deed of agreement under which the council agreed to withdraw its undetermined land claims at Stuarts Point. The agreement allowed the shire to acquire land needed to deliver the Stuarts Point sewerage scheme.

== Ancestral remains repatriation ==
In February 2020, at the joint request of the council and the Dunghutti Elders Council, the University of New England returned Aboriginal ancestral remains from its cultural collections to Dunghutti Country. The remains had been recovered from an eroded sand dune at Stuarts Point in the 1960s and held at the university for decades.

== See also ==
- NSW Aboriginal Land Council
- List of Local Aboriginal Land Councils in New South Wales
