= Coffs Harbour and District Local Aboriginal Land Council =

- Type: Local Aboriginal Land Council (NSW)
- Legal status: Statutory body corporate
- Headquarters: Coffs Harbour, New South Wales, Australia
- Region served: Coffs Harbour region

Coffs Harbour and District Local Aboriginal Land Council is a Local Aboriginal Land Council based in Coffs Harbour, New South Wales, Australia, on Gumbaynggirr Country. It forms part of the network of Aboriginal land councils established under the Aboriginal Land Rights Act 1983 (NSW).

== Red Rock land claim ==
In 2013, the Land and Environment Court of New South Wales ruled in favour of the council in Coffs Harbour and District Local Aboriginal Land Council v Minister Administering the Crown Lands Act [2013] NSWLEC 216. The claim, first lodged in 1993, concerned a 3.7-kilometre stretch of beach and foredune at Red Rock Beach between Red Rock and Corindi. The transfer was made subject to an easement preserving public access and recreation.

Following the Red Rock decision, the NSW Government introduced the Crown Lands Amendment (Public Ownership of Beaches and Coastal Lands) Bill 2014. ABC News reported on 4 November 2014 that the legislation had been "parked" pending further consultation with Aboriginal leaders, while the NSW Parliament bill page records that the bill was discharged from the Legislative Assembly Business Paper and withdrawn on the same date.

== Happy Valley land claims ==
Crown Lands says that more than 5.4 hectares of Crown land at Happy Valley, off Orlando Street near Coffs Creek, was returned to the council as freehold land after two Aboriginal land claims were part-granted. The area is described by Crown Lands as culturally significant to the local Aboriginal community and as having been used for thousands of years by the traditional custodians, the Gumbaynggirr people.

== See also ==
- NSW Aboriginal Land Council
- List of Local Aboriginal Land Councils in New South Wales
