= Coon Island =

Coon Island may refer to:

- Coon Island (California)
- Coon Island (Oregon)
- Pirrita Island, formerly known as Coon Island (Australia)
- Coon Island (Pennsylvania)
- Coon Island (Ontario)
- Coon Island (Washington)
- Coon Island (South Carolina)
- Coon Bone Island, West Virginia
- Coon Island Township, Butler County, Missouri
