= Gandangara Local Aboriginal Land Council =

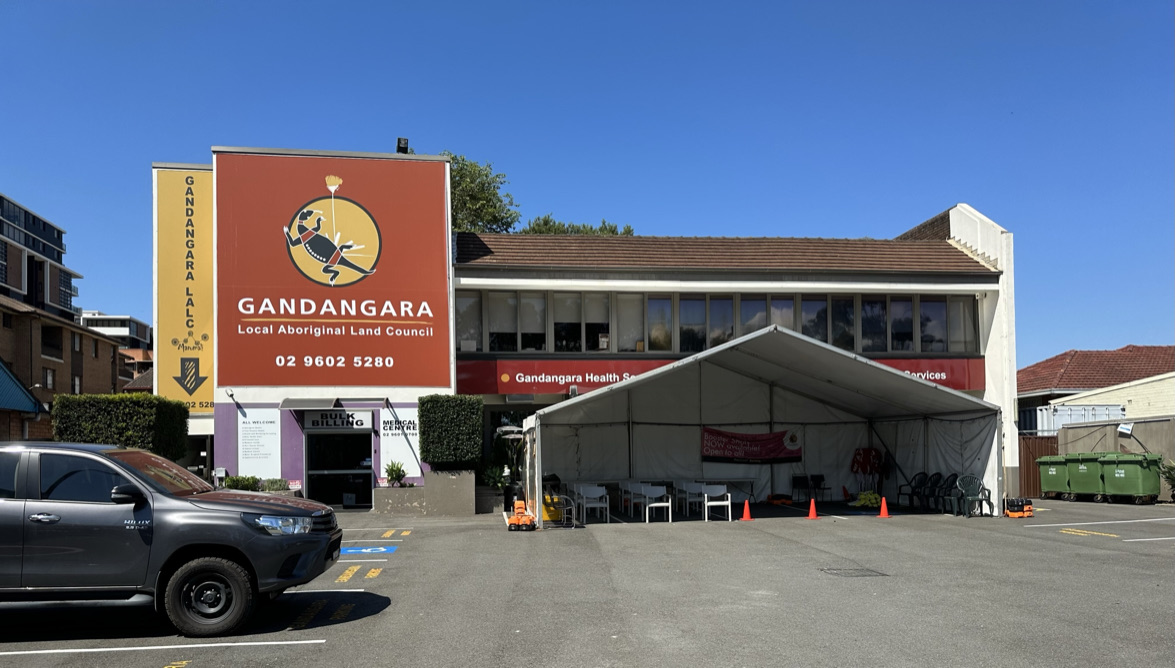
- Abbreviation: GLALC
- Type: Local Aboriginal Land Council (NSW)
- Legal status: Statutory body corporate
- Headquarters: Liverpool, New South Wales, Australia
- Region served: South-western Sydney
- Website: www.gandangara.org.au

Gandangara Local Aboriginal Land Council (GLALC) is a Local Aboriginal Land Council based in Liverpool, in south-western Sydney, New South Wales, Australia. It forms part of the network of Aboriginal land councils established under the Aboriginal Land Rights Act 1983 (NSW).

A 2021 Commonwealth consultation report on a proposed Aboriginal Keeping Place at Western Sydney Airport described Gandangara as the only Local Aboriginal Land Council in the area. The council also owns approximately 849 hectares at Heathcote Ridge in West Menai, in the Sutherland Shire.

== Land and development ==
=== Heathcote Ridge ===
GLALC owns approximately 849 hectares of mostly undeveloped land at Heathcote Ridge in the West Menai area. In 2011, the Australian Government and GLALC agreed to a strategic assessment under the Environment Protection and Biodiversity Conservation Act 1999 for proposed urban development on part of the site. The assessment program was endorsed by the federal Environment Minister in May 2013 and approved in June 2013, with approximately 283 hectares proposed for urban development including residential land, a village centre and open spaces.

In 2022, GLALC advised the Commonwealth that development had not yet started.

=== Barden Ridge ===
The St George & Sutherland Shire Leader reported in 2016 that GLALC was selling a 14.6-hectare site at Barden Ridge with a development application for 134 residential lots.

=== Jannali land claim ===
In December 2024, the New South Wales Court of Appeal allowed an appeal by the NSW Aboriginal Land Council concerning a land claim over Lot 3 in Deposited Plan 1001659 at the former Jannali Girls High School site in the Sutherland Shire. The court's official summary said the Minister had not established that the land was needed for an essential public purpose and ordered the Minister to transfer the lot to the NSW Aboriginal Land Council within 90 days. National Indigenous Times reported that the successful appeal would result in the land transferring to GLALC.

== ICAC investigation (Operation Greer) ==
In February 2017, the NSW Independent Commission Against Corruption released its report on Operation Greer, which investigated the conduct of GLALC's former chief executive officer Mark Johnson and members of the board. The commission found that Johnson had engaged in serious corrupt conduct by continuing to act as CEO while his private company, Waawidji Pty Ltd, received more than $107,000 in benefits from the council between June and December 2010.

The commission made no findings of serious corrupt conduct against members of the GLALC board. It said it was not of the opinion that consideration should be given to obtaining the advice of the Director of Public Prosecutions about prosecuting Johnson, and noted that he was no longer employed by GLALC.

== See also ==
- Aboriginal Land Rights Act 1983
- Gandangara
- NSW Aboriginal Land Council
- Western Sydney Airport
- Sutherland Shire
- List of Local Aboriginal Land Councils in New South Wales
