= Metford, New South Wales =

Metford
- Suburb
- Country: Australia
- State: New South Wales
- Region: Hunter
- City: Maitland
- LGA: City of Maitland

Government
  - State electorate: Maitland
  - Federal division: Paterson

Population
  - Total: 4,707 (SAL 2021)
- Postcode: 2323
- Parish: Maitland
Suburbs around Metford
	East Maitland, Tenambit	Chisholm
East Maitland	Metford	Thornton
Ashtonfield	Ashtonfield, Four Mile Creek

Metford is a suburb of the city of Maitland, New South Wales, Australia. It is on the New England Highway and has a railway station on NSW TrainLink's Hunter line. The line was opened in 1857, and the station was opened on 17 March 1995.

Metford is also home to the Mindaribba Aboriginal Cultural Centre, which Maitland City Council describes as the base of the Mindaribba Local Aboriginal Land Council.

== Education ==
There are two main schools in Metford, one being Metford Public School, a co-ed government primary school. and Maitland Christian School, a co-ed Baptist K–12 school.
