= Gunnedah railway station =

Railway station in New South Wales, Australia

Gunnedah
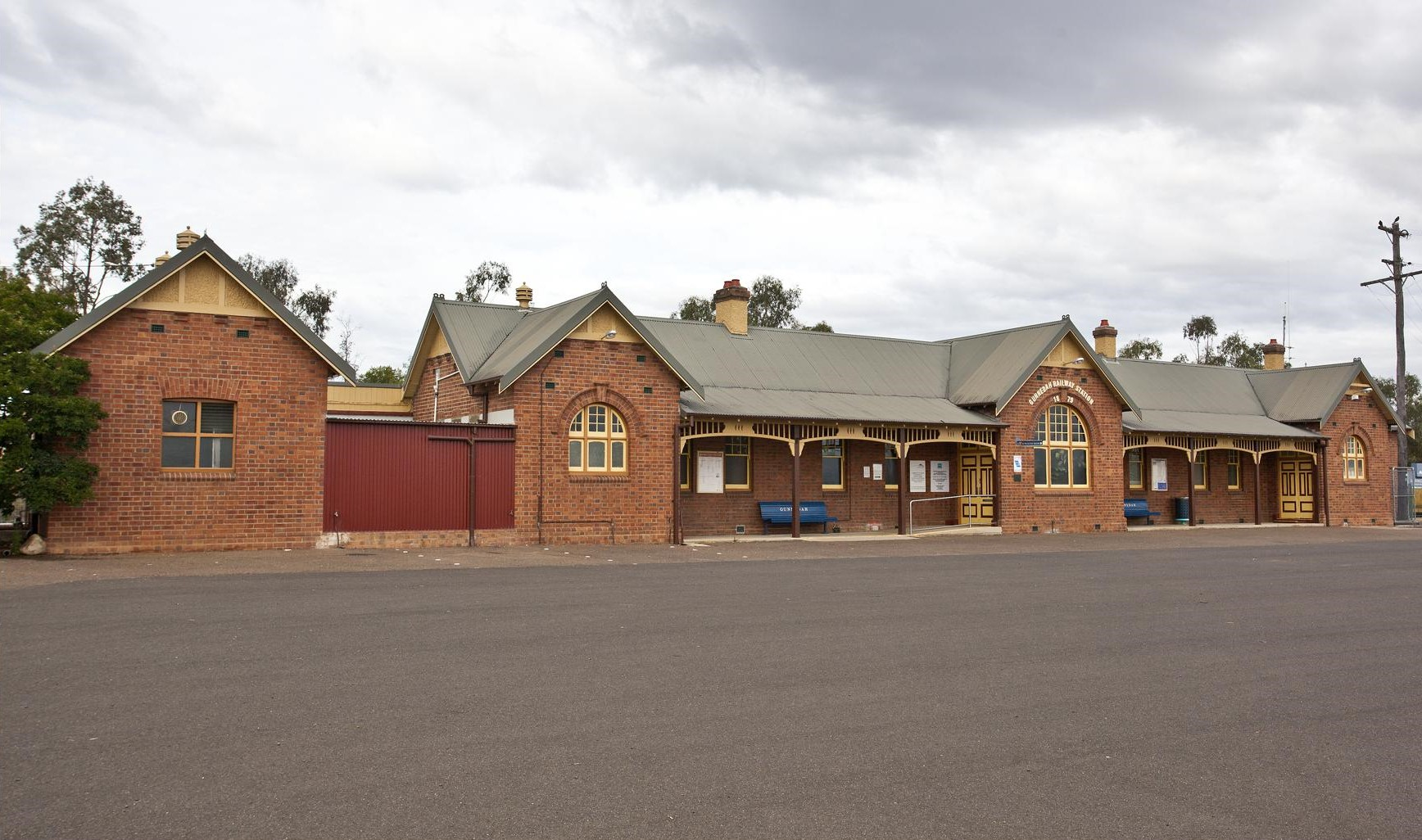
- The main entrance in November 2010

General information
- Location: Railway Avenue, Gunnedah; Australia
- Coordinates: 30°58′46″S 150°14′53″E
- Owner: Transport Asset Manager of New South Wales
- Operator: NSW TrainLink
- Line: Mungindi
- Distance: 475.80 kilometres (295.65 mi) from Central
- Platforms: 1
- Tracks: 3

Construction
- Structure type: Ground
- Accessible: Yes

Other information
- Status: Weekdays: Staffed: 9am to 12.30pm, 1.30pm to 4.30pm: Weekends and public holidays: Unstaffed
- Station code: GUH

History
- Opened: 11 September 1879

Services
Preceding station	NSW TrainLink	Following station
Boggabri towards Moree	NSW TrainLink North Western Line	Werris Creek towards Sydney
Location

Gunnedah railway station is located on the Mungindi line in New South Wales, Australia. It serves the town of Gunnedah. It was added to the New South Wales State Heritage Register on 2 April 1999.

== History ==
The station opened on 11 September 1879 when the line was extended from Breeza. It served as the terminus of the line until it was extended to Boggabri on 11 July 1882.

The original station building was replaced by the current structure in 1915. The station has one platform and a passing loop.

== Services ==
Gunnedah is served by NSW TrainLink's daily Northern Tablelands Xplorer service operating between Moree and Sydney.

Platform	Line	Stopping pattern	Notes
1	North Western Region	services to Sydney Central & Moree	

== Description ==
The station complex consists of a type 11 brick station building of an initial side platform design with unusual brackets to its awning, and an associated loading bank.

== Heritage listing ==
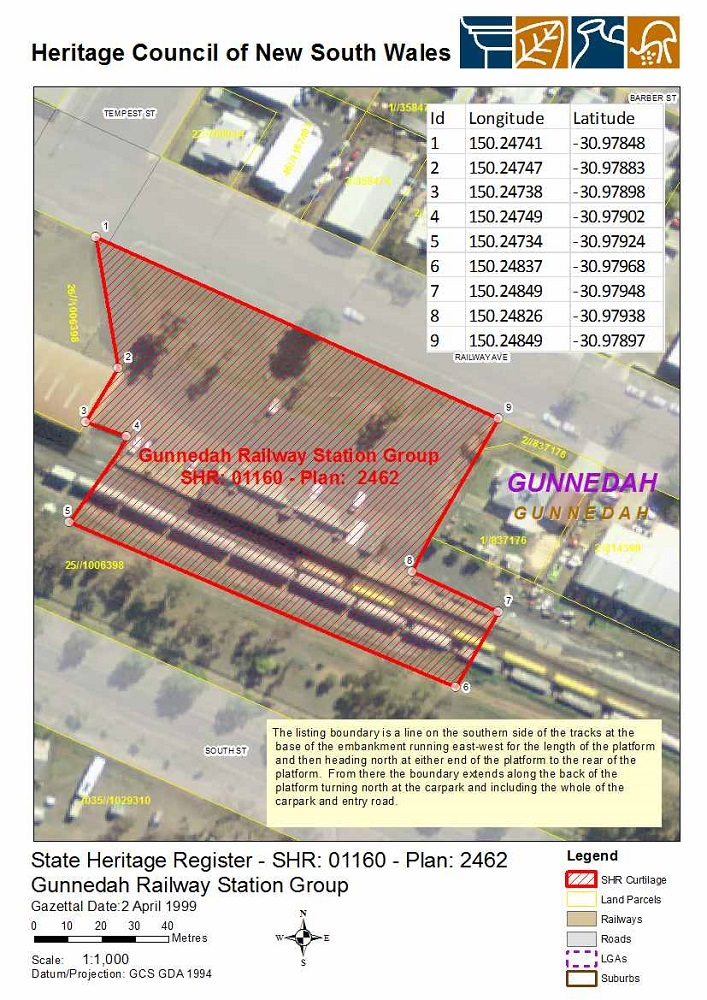
Heritage boundaries

The station building is unique as it was built during a period where country stations were generally simple in design. This is a large structure with an unusually large cantilevered awning to the platform. It is a well-proportioned substantial brick building and although modest in detail, it is an imposing structure for its time. It is unusual in that it exhibits Edwardian elements such as the curved window heads and A/C shingle roof. The building adds to the historic fabric of the town presenting an elegant facade to the street while presenting an unusually large awning to the platform side. It is one of the few surviving substantial railway buildings in the north-west of the State.

Gunnedah railway station was listed on the New South Wales State Heritage Register on 2 April 1999 having satisfied the following criteria.

The place possesses uncommon, rare or endangered aspects of the cultural or natural history of New South Wales.

This item is assessed as historically rare. This item is assessed as arch. rare. This item is assessed as socially rare.
