= Worimi conservation lands =

Conservation area in New South Wales, Australia

Coordinates: 32°49′10.4″S 151°55′18.5″E

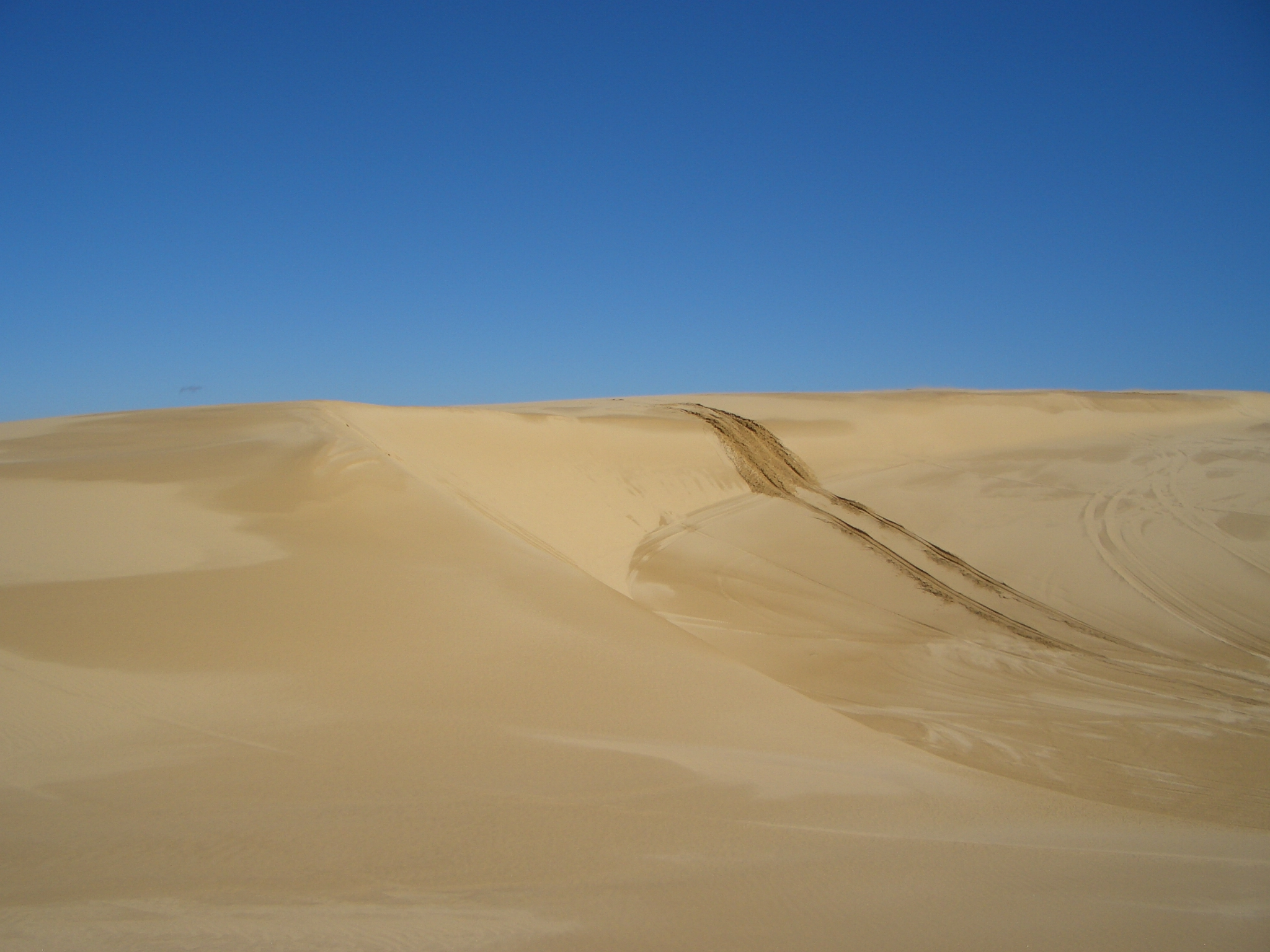
Stockton Beach and its wide dunes

The Worimi conservation lands are located on and adjacent to Stockton Beach in New South Wales, Australia. They were created in February 2007 when Crown land at Stockton Bight was granted to the Worimi Local Aboriginal Land Council. The lands were then leased back to the NSW Government as three conservation reserves – including Worimi National Park – covering an area of 4,436 ha (10,962 acres). Day-to-day management of the Worimi conservation lands is undertaken by the NSW National Parks & Wildlife Service.

== Geography ==
The Worimi conservation lands stretch from south-west of the wreck of the 1967 MV Sygna, north-east along Stockton Beach to just west of the end of the beach at Anna Bay. They consist of the 1,826 ha (4,512-acre) Worimi National Park, 1,042 ha (2,575-acre) Worimi State Conservation Area and 1,568 ha (3,875-acre) Worimi Regional Park. The lands include scrub land to the north-west of Stockton Beach and reach almost to Nelson Bay Road, about 2 km (1.2 mi) from the shoreline.

=== Stockton Beach ===
Stockton Beach, on the Tasman Sea, is 32 km (20 mi) long and stretches from Stockton, in an approximate north-easterly direction to Anna Bay in Port Stephens. In some areas it is as much as 1 km (0.6 mi) wide and has sand dunes over 30 metres (98 ft) high. Each year the dunes move north by approximately 4 m (13 ft). Approximately 23 km (14 mi) of the length of Stockton Beach is included in the Worimi conservation lands.

== History ==
The creation of the Worimi Conservation Lands occurred in February 2007. Its creation was the result of extensive efforts by the Worimi people to have this area reserved to ensure the protection of their cultural heritage, and recognition of their communities association with the area for thousands of years.

The Worimi Conservation Lands are overseen by a Board comprising a majority of stakeholders from the Worimi Community, plus representatives from the NSW National Parks and Wildlife Service, Port Stephens Local Council, nearby landholders, and a conservationist representative.

The Worimi Conservation Lands will be managed according to a Plan of Management prepared by the NSW National Parks and Wildlife Service. As at early 2012 the Plan of Management is still undergoing drafting.

== Tourism ==
Commercial tourist operators provide access to the Worimi Conservation Lands.
