= Newcastle Post Office =

Heritage-listed building, Newcastle, Australia

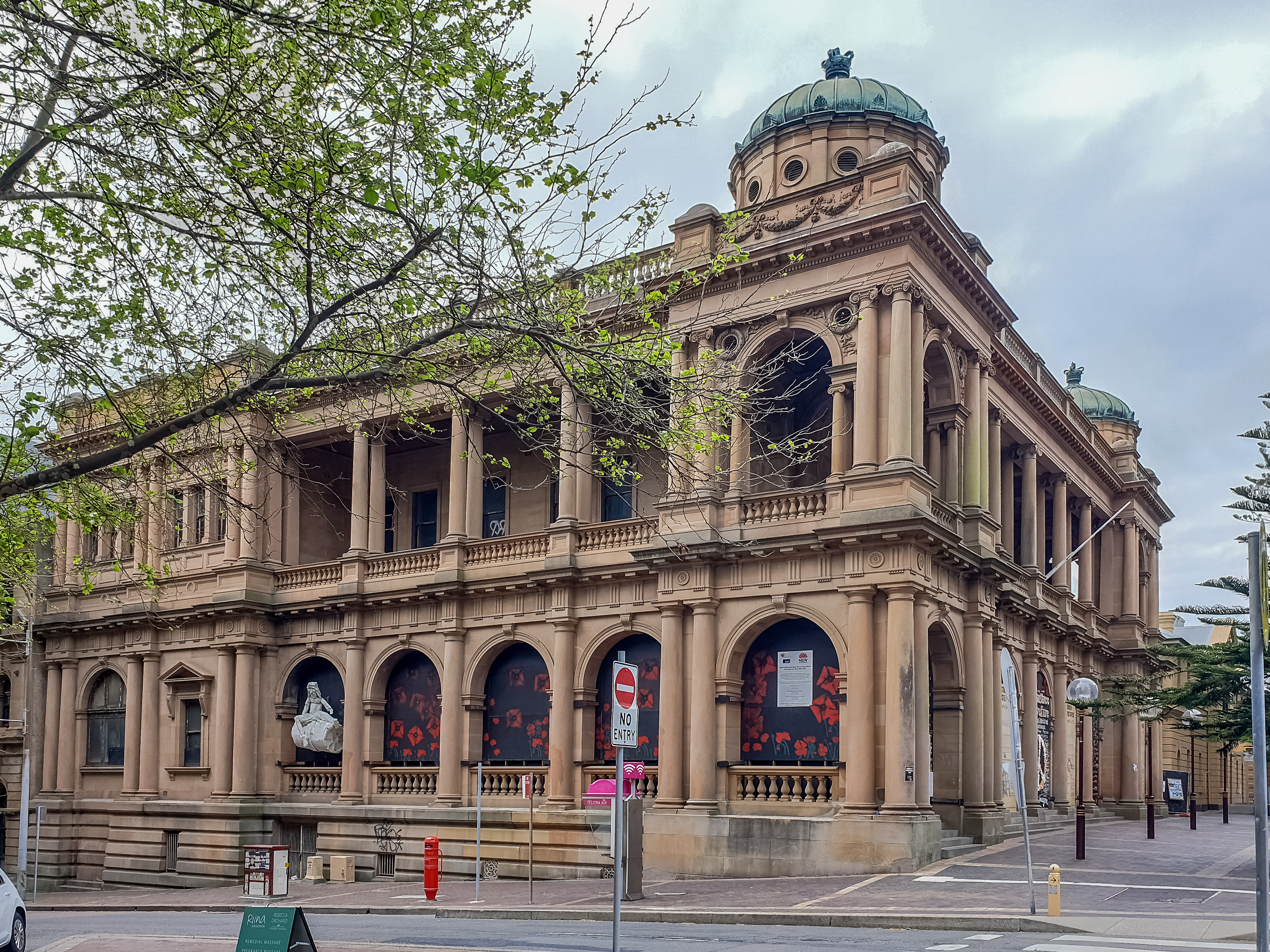

- Location within New South Wales Location within Australia
- 32.9274°S 151.7836°E
- Location: 96 Hunter Street, Newcastle, New South Wales, Australia

History
- Built: 1900–1903

Site notes
- Architect: Walter Liberty Vernon

New South Wales Heritage Register
- Official name: Newcastle Post Office
- Type: state heritage (built)
- Designated: 22 December 2000
- Reference no.: 1442
- Type: Post Office
- Category: Postal and Telecommunications
- Builders: R Saunders, Loveridge & Hudson, Mountney & Co., Chas Dobson & Co., JP Woods

Newcastle Post Office is a heritage-listed former post office at 96 Hunter Street, Newcastle, New South Wales, Australia. It was designed by Walter Liberty Vernon in his capacity as New South Wales Government Architect and was built from 1900 to 1903 by R. Saunders (freestone), Loveridge & Hudson (trachyte), Mountney & Co. (steel joists and girders), Chas Dobson & Co. (mosaic tile floors) and J. P. Woods (carver's work). It was added to the New South Wales State Heritage Register on 22 December 2000.

== History ==
=== Postal services ===
The first official postal service in Australia was established in April 1809, when the Sydney merchant Isaac Nichols was appointed as the first Postmaster in the colony. Prior to this, mail had been distributed directly by the captain of the ship on which the mail arrived, however this system was neither reliable nor secure.

In 1825 the colonial administration was empowered to establish a Postmaster General's Department, which had previously been administered from Britain.

In 1828 the first post offices outside of Sydney were established, with offices in Bathurst, Campbelltown, Parramatta, Liverpool, Newcastle, Penrith and Windsor. By 1839 there were forty post offices in the colony, with more opened as settlement spread. During the 1860s, the advance of postal services was further increased as the railway network began to be established throughout NSW. In 1863, the Postmaster General WH Christie noted that accommodation facilities for Postmasters in some post offices was quite limited, and stated that it was a matter of importance that "post masters should reside and sleep under the same roof as the office".

The first telegraph line was opened in Victoria in March 1854 and in NSW in 1858. The NSW colonial government constructed two lines from the GPO, one to the South Head Signal Station, the other to Liverpool. Development was slow in NSW compared to the other states, with the Government concentrating on the development of country offices before suburban ones. As the line spread, however, telegraph offices were built to accommodate the operators. Unlike the Post Office, the telegraph office needed specialised equipment and could not be easily accommodated in a local store or private residence.

Post and telegraph offices operated separately until 1870 when the departments were amalgamated, after which time new offices were built to include both postal and telegraph services. In 1881 the first telephone exchange was opened in Sydney, three years after the first tests in Adelaide. As with the telegraph, the telephone system soon began to extend into country areas, with telephone exchanges appearing in country NSW from the late 1880s onwards. Again the Post Office was responsible for the public telephone exchange, further emphasising its place in the community as a provider of communications services.

The appointment of James Barnet as Acting Colonial Architect in 1862 coincided with a considerable increase in funding to the public works program. Between 1865 and 1890 the Colonial Architect's Office was responsible for the building and maintenance of 169 post offices and telegraph offices in NSW. Those constructed during this period featured a variety of architectural styles, as Barnet argued that the local parliamentary representatives always preferred "different patterns".

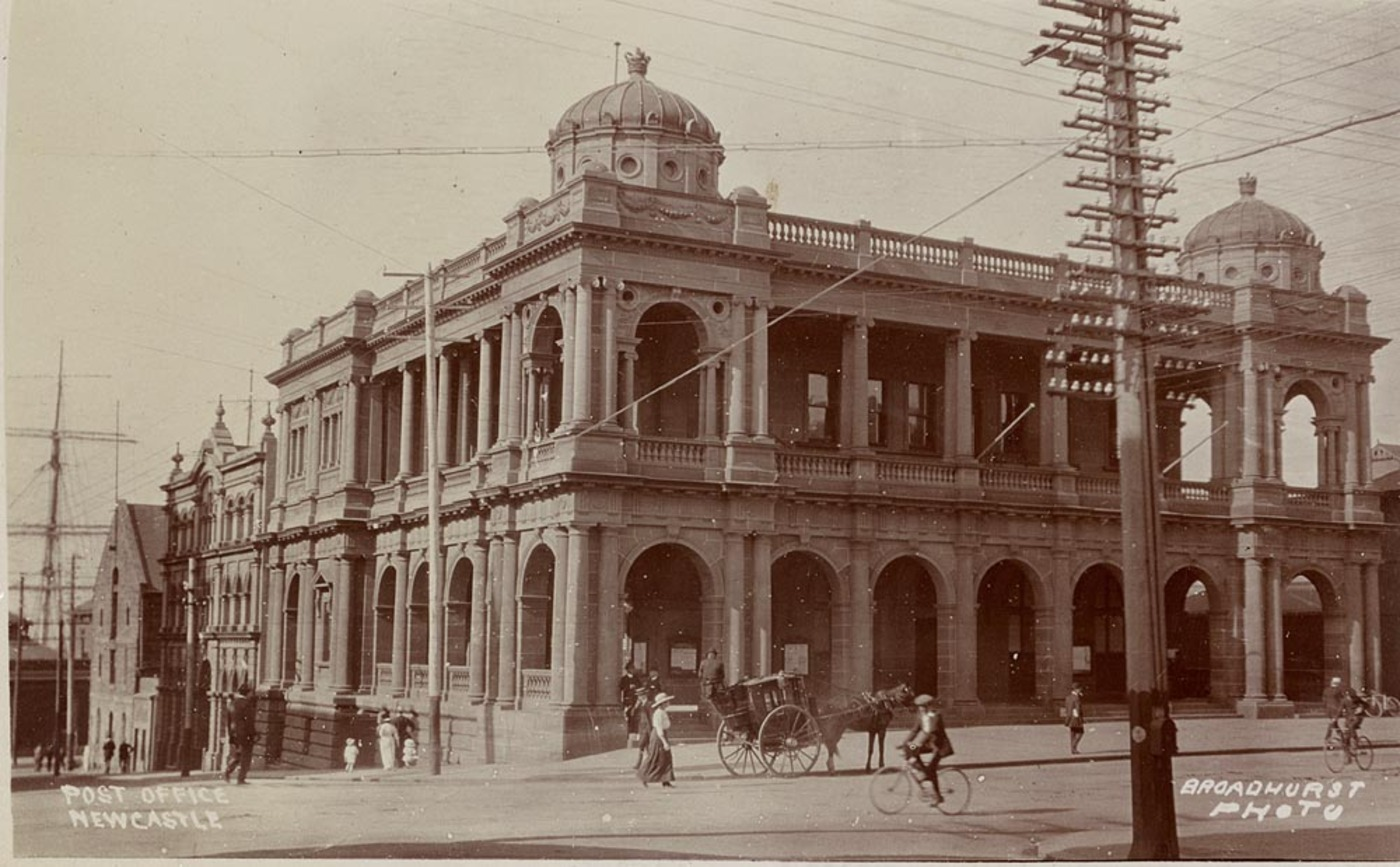
The Post Office in the early 1900s

The construction of new post offices continued throughout the 1890s Depression years under the leadership of Walter Liberty Vernon, who held office from 1890 to 1911. While twenty-seven post offices were built between 1892 and 1895, funding to the Government Architect's Office was cut from 1893 to 1895, causing Vernon to postpone a number of projects.

Following Federation in 1901, the Commonwealth Government took over responsibility for post, telegraph and telephone offices, with the Department of Home Affairs Works Division being made responsible for post office construction. In 1916 construction was transferred to the Department of Works and Railways, with the Department of the Interior responsible during World War II.

On 22 December 1975, the Postmaster General's Department was abolished and replaced by the Postal and Telecommunications Department. This was the creation of Telecom and Australia Post. In 1989, the Australian Postal Corporation Act established Australia Post as a self-funding entity, heralding a new direction in property management, including a move away from the larger more traditional buildings towards smaller shop front style post offices.

For much of its history, the post office has been responsible for a wide variety of community services including mail distribution, an agency for the Commonwealth Savings Bank, electoral enrolments, and the provision of telegraph and telephone services. The town post office has served as a focal point for the community, most often built in a prominent position in the centre of town close to other public buildings, creating a nucleus of civic buildings and community pride.

=== Newcastle Post Office ===
The first Newcastle Post Office was opened on 1 March 1828, being one of the first seven opened outside Sydney. The original office was situated in the "Sessions House" on the corner of Watt and Church Streets, with Duncan Forbes Mackay, the Superintendent of Convicts, as the first Postmaster. Mail was delivered once per week from Sydney on the "Lord Liverpool", a 71-ton cutter recently arrived from England. In 1832 steam vessels were being used to carry the mail from Sydney, with the service extending to Maitland. As Maitland was closer to the expanding settlements further up the Hunter Valley, the Post Office there soon outstripped Newcastle in terms of postal business, being described as a principal office of the area by 1844, making more than twice as much per year as Newcastle.

In July 1851 it was reported that the post office premise had been burnt down but that all post office property had been saved. The post office was relocated to a Government-owned cottage occupied by Major Russell. The cottage had been constructed in Watt Street in 1818 as the Commissariat Store and was considered to be one of the principal buildings in town. In 1862 the status of the Newcastle Post Office was raised to that of an official office. This conversion prepared the way for the introduction of money order facilities to be made available at Newcastle, making it one of the first branch offices for money orders when they became available in 1863.

A Government Savings Branch was opened in 1871. This remained as the Post Office until 1872 when a new office was constructed on the northwest corner of Hunter and Watt Streets. The site for the new office had been debated in the council since a new post office had been proposed in 1871. The council, who voted for a site in the main street as close to the wharves as possible, favoured the chosen location. This post office still stands today.

The new office was completed in 1872 by local contractors Messrs Laing and Wylie. The office was two storeys high, of brick construction, with cement rendering. It was officially opened on 10 June 1873. During the 1870s the telegraph office in the city was handling 55,000 messages per year, which provides an indication of the importance of this form of communication at the time.

In 1881 alterations and additions were approved, providing a separate place to sort mail, a room for the use of the postmen, and increased office space. A small washing shed was also to be constructed for the use of the Postmaster's wife, Mrs Thompson, who had been doing the washing in the yard of the office. In 1883 the ceiling of the office was replaced (following the collapse of the original) and the provision of a balcony similar to "one at the Joint Stock bank" was also approved.

During the alterations temporary accommodation was sought in a shop leased from local developer Mr Fleming, who had built four shops close by in Hunter Street. The new work also included a portico over the front entrance (later removed), two new letter receivers opposite the office and a colonnade with a letter delivery window facing it. The post office was ready for reoccupation on 13 April 1886.

The city experienced a period of considerable economic and social growth, arising from the development of the coal industry in the latter part of the nineteenth century. During the 1880s the colonial government responded to the development of its Second City by improving its public buildings.

By 1899 the Government decided to build a new post office building on the site of the old Court House on the corner of Hunter and Bolton Streets. Government Architect Walter Liberty Vernon designed the office with tenders for the erection of the post and telegraph office, set at £19,229, accepted in March 1900. However, after two of the contractors withdrew from their contracts in April 1900, the Department of Works decided to continue with the construction using day labour, at an estimated cost of £20,000. The work was carried out under the supervision of George McRae, Principal Assistant Architect, with Captain T. S. Phillips as Clerk of Works. Some of the tenders included R/ Saunders of Pyrmont for freestone, Messrs Loveridge and Hudson for trachyte, Mountney & Co of Sydney for rolled steel joists and girders, Chas Dobson and Co for tile mosaic floors and JP Woods of Waverley for carving work.

In March 1902 the Department advised that work would stop unless more money was made available. Progress had been delayed due to the change of system for financial approval that had come with the transfer from State to Federal control after Federation. The total cost of the building was (Pounds)33,500.

The Post Master General, Senator Drake, opened the building on Saturday 8 August 1903. Despite this, it was not until February 1904 that the building was actually occupied. The new office consisted of a ground floor main office, mail room and offices, with clerks accommodation upstairs, as well as an operating room, telephone exchange, night officer's bedroom, bathroom, retiring rooms and lavatory for telephone operators. In the basement there was a battery room, workshops, store, heating chamber, lavatory and sanitary accommodation. Cables for the telegraph and telephone equipment were brought into the office via tunnels and then to the appropriate rooms.

Unspecified additions were made to the Post Office during 1912–13, costing £100.

In 1938 the adjoining building in Bolton Street was acquired by the post office. The building had been built by Castlemaine Brewery as a Bond Store and had more recently housed the Bowery Restaurant. The new addition was then used to house an extended mail handling section, remaining there until its relocation to New Lambton in 1973.

The interior of the office has undergone a series of changes to accommodate more recent retail requirements. The post office has subsequently vacated the building and moved to modern premises.

The building was sold by the federal government in 2002 to Sydney-based developer, Sean Ngu for about $2m. Mr Ngu released plans for an upmarket bar. After this plan was rejected, the state government purchased the building in 2010 for a rumoured $5m. In 2011 the state government rejected a claim on the site by the Awabakal Land Council, which appealed the ruling in the NSW Land & Environment Court. The Court ruled in Awabakal's favour in 2014. Awabakal hoped to use the building as an Aboriginal health and cultural centre, but were unable to raise the $5 million necessary to restore the building to the state where it could be occupied.

In 2017, the building was completely disused and was reported to have fallen into disrepair and to be in very poor condition. It was advertised for sale in late 2017, with 11 bidders reportedly vying for the property. One bidder, hotel magnate Jerry Schwartz, went public with a $3.33 million bid to turn it into a conference centre and bar, which was successful.

== Description ==
Newcastle Post Office is a visually dominant building in the streetscape, located on a prominent corner position within the civic centre. Built in 1902–03, it is a two-storey Federation Academic Classical, ashlar block, sandstone building, with an additional basement below street level and an upper mezzanine level. There is a complex hipped and skillion corrugated steel roof behind a deep balustraded sandstone parapet, which is continuous around the perimeter, and there is domed copper roofing with squat cupolas at either corner of the front facade. Sandstone chimneys punctuating the roofline have either been removed or have rendered capping. The building is completely symmetrical to the front facade, with arched window openings to the ground floor and squared openings to the first floor.

There is a two-storey colonnade on the building, which wraps around three facades. The ground floor has an early grey and white mosaic tiled floor in very good condition, stone steps and a sandstone balustrade along the Bolton Street side, as well as vaulted rendered soffit and modern pendant lights. There is an intrusive, small concrete ramp to the eastern end of the front facade colonnade. The first floor has a roofing felt floor covering, rendered flat soffit with carved sandstone cornices and a flagpole attached to the floor fabric at the centre of the front facade. The first-floor colonnade is accessed via timber stairs from the first floor at either end of the front facade.

The dominant fabric of the building is a fine-grained sandstone, consisting of ashlar blocks and numerous carved classical elements. These include the Doric columns of the ground floor, the Ionic columns of the first floor and other detailing such as entablatures at first-floor and roof levels with attached triglyphs, projecting cornices and round arches of the ground-floor colonnade with prominent keystones. The rear of the building is constructed of yellow face brick with sandstone banding. Window frames are currently painted a dark brown colour. There is also a central light well servicing the building.

The interior of Newcastle Post Office has been altered substantially from its original plans, particularly in the upper levels. Overall, the building comprises four distinct levels, accessed via stairwells on either side, these include the basement, ground floor, upper mezzanine and first floor in succession.

The basement level is located below Hunter Street, with openings to Bolton Street. It comprises several subterranean rooms, which were either used for storage or vacant prior to the Post Office vacating the building. The basement has a concrete floor and the straight flight of stone steps accesses it. The large northern light well has a central drainage point and a bitumen floor. The ceiling varies between shallow vaulted concrete in the western side room and small adjacent store room, a board and batten ceiling in the room to the west of the light well and mini-orb iron ceilings to the remainder of the level. Lighting to the basement is predominantly fluorescent. Original or early architraves are located in the openings of the basement level, there was no skirting evident. Doors are four panel and windows are mainly two pane upper and lower, timber sash windows, with two modern flush doors on the eastern side accessing plant rooms. Walls of the basement are painted brick, with shallow face brick arches on the openings on Bolton Street. There is a substantial amount of built-in shelving retained to most of the rooms and there is a half-glazed early partition wall defining the hallway. No fireplaces are located on the basement level.

The ground floor comprised three main areas at the time of the post office vacating the building, including a large retail area, post boxes and a mail sorting area and postmaster's office. The entire ground floor is carpeted with the exception of the western stairwell, which has sheet vinyl flooring. The ground-floor ceilings vary between square set plaster over the locker room and lift area, plaster ceiling with a moulded cornice in the retail area, offices and store room, and plasterboard to the remainder of the level with a coved cornice. A lowered plasterboard ceiling encloses the public post boxes area as a separate space within the high roofed retail area, accessed externally. Lighting of the ground floor is a combination of fluorescent and large pendant lights and there is exposed suspended air conditioning ducting. Architraves of the ground floor are predominantly modern (dating from the 1996 retail fitout); however, some original skirting and architraves have been retained to some of the outer walls and original window and door openings. Windows of the ground floor include original paired, single upper and lower pane timber sash windows with arched fanlights over each pair and six pane arched windows in the main facades. Doors of this level are all modern from the Australia Post fitout. Walls include painted rendered brick in a grey colour scheme, grey painted partition walls enclosing the post boxes area and a timber veneer partition wall in the northwestern store room. No fireplaces have been retained on the ground floor.

There are two main stairs servicing the building. The eastern stair appears to be original, with a curved polished rail, vinyl clad stone or concrete steps and a cut render dado rail. Skirting is also cut into the render of the stairwell and has been painted brown. The western stair is not in its original position and has a modern rail and vinyl sheet flooring.

The mezzanine of Newcastle Post Office is located below and towards the rear of the first floor. The carpeted former staff lunchroom and timber-floored side room currently occupy this level, with a long sheet-vinyl-floored corridor running across the rear of the building between both stairwells. Ceilings of the mezzanine include plasterboard in the lunchroom with a coved cornice, plaster with a moulded cornice in the side room, board and batten in the corridor and square set plaster in the stairwells. Lighting is mainly fluorescent tubing. Architraves and skirting of the mezzanine level are largely modern, with some early remnants, particularly on the windows facing the light well from the lunchroom. Windows on this level are original or early single upper and lower pane and double upper and lower pane, timber sash windows, excepting the disused "spy" windows in the eastern end of the corridor. Doors are modern. Walls are mainly rendered and painted brick in a grey and cream colour scheme, with partition walls separating the hall and lunchroom. There are no fireplaces located on this level.

The first floor was already vacant prior to the Post Office vacating the building, with carpet in the northwestern office space, timber floorboards in the northeastern office space and vinyl sheet flooring in the remainder. The ceilings of this level are generally in poor condition through damage from vermin and moisture. There is a board and batten ceiling in the southeastern corner room with substantial damage, and acoustic tiling to the remainder of the level. There is attached and suspended fluorescent lighting on the first floor, as well as air conditioning ducting and vents in the ceilings. Some original skirting has been retained on this floor and is in poor to fair condition, the majority dates from later alterations. The architraves appear to be largely original with some minor alterations. Windows appear original or early, being single upper and lower pane and two pane upper and lower timber sash windows. There are original French doors to the front colonnade and modern internal doors. There is substantial weathering damage evident to the exterior of the windows and doors, their hardware and frames. Walls of the first floor are predominantly rendered and painted brick in a cream and white colour scheme. There are partition walls at the centre of the floor and half-glazed timber partitions in the northeast and northwestern office spaces. Three chimney-breasts are evident on this level, however all traces of the fireplaces have been removed.

Signage is minimal, and limited to the etched glasswork of the doors and windows of the ground floor.

An extremely dominant building, Newcastle Post Office is situated on a prominent corner, with a complementary styled late nineteenth-century building abutting the rear of the Post Office to the north and there is an early building to the east, separated from the Post Office building by a laneway. The surrounding streetscape comprises three to multi storey commercial, retail and residential mixed-use buildings of predominantly nineteenth century construction. There is recent public seating at the front of the building, along with garbage bins, lamp posts, picket fenced pine trees and a memorial with drinking fountains.

=== Condition ===
The exterior of the building was reported as being in very good condition as of 4 August 2000, with the exception of some cracking and patching associated with seismic activity.

The basement shows evidence of damp in the walls and in the floor, with some minor concrete cracking in the floor. There is also evidence of damp to the light well walls, with some peeling paint.

The ground floor is in very good condition, being recently restored.

The upper levels show signs of moisture with peeling paint to ceilings and minor wall cracking. Flooring on the upper levels, particularly on the first floor is in poor to fair condition, with substantial amounts of patching evident. There is also some sandstone damage from reinforcement to the upper floor balustrade and cracking in the rendered soffit.

There is medium archaeological potential, as the site is fully occupied by the Post Office and adjacent buildings. There is the possibly of earlier building and land use remnants below the building, however the area has been heavily developed over time.

The exterior fabric of Newcastle Post Office is substantially intact, although the interior has been substantially altered over time. Newcastle Post Office retains the features which make it culturally significant, including the use of freestone and sculptural work, the domed pavilions and classical motifs, along with its overall grand scale, form and architectural style.

=== Modifications and dates ===
The original building was constructed on the site of the former Court House, and opened in August 1903. The building comprised ground, and first floors with a mezzanine lower than the first and a basement directly below the ground floor. The ground floor contained offices, public space and a mail room. The first floor contained clerks' accommodation, operating room, telephone exchange, night officer's bedroom, bathroom, retiring rooms and toilet. The basement catered for the battery room, workshop, store, heating, toilet and sanitary accommodation and the mezzanine comprised an office and store.

Between 1912 and 1913 unspecified additions were made to the building.

Extensions to the mail room in 1938 included the acquisition of the building adjoining the Post Office, with an entrance being made to the Bolton Street side of the office and the mail handling section was moved up from the basement to a mezzanine floor.

The northwestern corner and original stair have been reconfigured, date of change is unknown

In 1973 the mail handling role of the building ceased when this function was moved to Broadmeadow. The loading dock and awning were installed c. 1970s.

In 1996 the Post Office was fitted out with the standard Australia Post retail fitout and colour scheme. During 1998–99, restoration work was carried out, particularly to the stonework.

Intrusive elements include the modern concrete loading dock attached to the eastern side of the building and the cantilevered awning attached to the wall above. The small concrete ramp to the eastern end of the front facade colonnade is also an intrusive element.

== Heritage listing ==
Newcastle Post Office is significant at a State level for its historical associations, aesthetic qualities and social value.

Newcastle Post Office is linked with the original post office established in 1828 and, as such, is associated with the early development of the city. Its form and scale reflect the prosperity of the city in the late nineteenth century with the development of the coal industry and provide evidence of the changing nature of postal and telecommunications practices in NSW.

Newcastle Post Office is aesthetically significant because it is an excellent and imposing example of the Federation Academic Classical style of architecture and is a central landmark feature of the civic precinct. Along with the Police Station, Department of Public Works offices and the Post Office Annexe buildings, the Post Office forms an important civic group of buildings.

Newcastle Post Office was designed by NSW Government Architect Walter Liberty Vernon, a key practitioner of the Federation Academic Classical style of architecture.

Newcastle Post Office is significant to the Newcastle community's sense of place.

Newcastle Post Office was listed on the New South Wales State Heritage Register on 22 December 2000 having satisfied the following criteria.

The place is important in demonstrating the course, or pattern, of cultural or natural history in New South Wales.

Newcastle Post Office is linked with the original post office established in Newcastle in 1828. As such, it is associated with the early development of the city. The current post office has been the centre of communications for the city for almost a century.

The form and scale of Newcastle Post Office reflects the prosperity of the city in the late nineteenth century due to the development of the coal industry. The amount of money spent on its construction and the architectural qualities of the building provide an insight into the way of life in Newcastle during this period.

Newcastle Post Office also provides evidence of the changing nature of postal and telecommunications practices in NSW.

The current Newcastle Post Office is associated with the earlier (1872) post office, which still stands today.

The place has a strong or special association with a person, or group of persons, of importance of cultural or natural history of New South Wales's history.

Newcastle Post Office was designed by Walter Liberty Vernon, Government Architect and a key practitioner of the Federation Academic Classical style of architecture.

The place is important in demonstrating aesthetic characteristics and/or a high degree of creative or technical achievement in New South Wales.

Newcastle Post Office is aesthetically significant because it is an excellent and imposing example of the Federation Academic Classical style of architecture, with such distinctive characteristics as the use of freestone and sculptural work, domed pavilions, two-storey loggias and classical motifs.

The grand scale, architectural style and location of Newcastle Post office make it a central landmark feature of the civic precinct of Newcastle. Along with the Police Station, Department of Public Works offices and the Post Office Annexe buildings, Newcastle Post Office forms an important civic group of buildings.

The building compares with Vernon's additions to the Sydney GPO (1896).

The place has a strong or special association with a particular community or cultural group in New South Wales for social, cultural or spiritual reasons.

As a prominent local landmark and the centre of communications for the town for over a century, Newcastle Post Office is considered to be highly significant to the Newcastle community's sense of place.

The place has potential to yield information that will contribute to an understanding of the cultural or natural history of New South Wales.

The use of underground cables for the telegraph and telephone services reflects the advance of technology in this field of communications in Australia. While the cables have been removed, the tunnels still exist, and are of some technological interest.

The site also has some potential to contain archaeological information relating to the previous use of the site by the Court House, and the evolution of the Post Office building.

The place possesses uncommon, rare or endangered aspects of the cultural or natural history of New South Wales.

The grand scale, architectural style and prominence of Newcastle Post Office combine to make it a rare example of post offices in NSW.

The place is important in demonstrating the principal characteristics of a class of cultural or natural places/environments in New South Wales.

Newcastle Post Office is a particularly fine example of the Federation Academic Classical style of architecture. It is part of a group of post offices designed by Walter Liberty Vernon in NSW.
