= Pirrita Island =

Island in the City of Lake Macquarie, NSW, Australia

Native name: Galgabba
- Interactive map of Pirrita Island
- Etymology: Local Awabakal Aboriginal word for oysters from the mangrove tree, which signifies the oysters growing on the mangrove bushes in this part of the lake.

Geography
- Coordinates: 33°4′19.6″S 151°38′19.3″E
- Adjacent to: Swansea Channel
- Area: 9.3 ha (23 acres)
- Highest elevation: 5 m (16 ft)

Administration
- Australia
- State: New South Wales
- council: City of Lake Macquarie

Demographics
- Population: 0 (1994)When the land leases expired, they were never renewed, with the last resident leaving in 1994.

Additional information
- Time zone: AEST (UTC+10)

Pirrita Island is an island in the Swansea Channel in the City of Lake Macquarie of New South Wales, Australia. It is adjacent to the suburb of Swansea.

The Awabakal people called the area of Swansea Galgabba, which means a place to rest. The area was a rich hunting and fishing ground for the original inhabitants.

The island is a popular nature tourism spot, with walking trails and seasonal birdwatching. Migratory birds such as the Far Eastern curlew, Bar-tailed godwit, Pied oyster-catcher, White-faced heron, Crested tern, and Little egret come from as far as Siberia and Alaska to rest and feed.

== History ==
The first recorded settlement on the island was in 1915. More residents arrived during the Mine Lock-Outs and Great Depression of the late 1920s and early 1930s. Boatsheds originally lined the channel side of the island, however during hardship, mining families sought refuge here. They lived in an estimated 70 basic houses, which often fell victim to the lake tides. When their land leases expired, they were never renewed, with the last resident leaving in 1994.

The island was originally named Coon Island in 1915 after the first permanent resident of the island, Herbert 'Coon' Heaney. A white man from Greta, Heaney was given the racist epithet 'coon' because he worked in the coal mines and would often have coal dust on his face.

The Bahtabah Aboriginal Land Council, which has represented the indigenous people of east Lake Macquarie for more than 30 years, said the island's name was offensive to Aboriginal people.

It's a very hurtful term, you know that's something that was used in my childhood and is quite upsetting actually.

— Bahtabah Aboriginal Land Council Chief Executive, Carol Proctor, NBN News

On 22 February 2021, the City of Lake Macquarie began the process of community consultation for changing the names of both Coon Island and nearby Coon Island Point (now called Miners Point). The two grandsons of Herbert Heaney supported the change of name.

In July 2021, the council decided to change the island's name to Pirrita Island, and Coon Island Point to Miners Point, and made a submission to the NSW Government's Geographical Names Board. On 20 May 2022, the GNB published both changes of name in the NSW Government Gazette, making them official.

== Books ==
- Hall, Val (2007). History of Coon Island : a collection of facts, photos and memories from former residents, photos and documents about the community that lived on Coon Island and Little Coonie, Swansea New South Wales between 1915 and 1994. Bass Hill, NSW. ISBN 9780646483177.
