= Australian Charities and Not-for-profits Commission =

Charity regulation agency of the Australian Government

Commission overview
- Formed: 3 December 2012
- Jurisdiction: Australia
- Commission executive: Sue Woodward, AM, Commissioner
- Parent department: Australian Taxation Office
- Website: acnc.gov.au

The Australian Charities and Not-for-profits Commission (ACNC) is the regulatory authority for charities and not-for-profit organisations within Australia. The Commission was established in December 2012 as part of the Australian Charities and Not-for-profits Commission Act 2012 passed by the federal parliament, and is responsible for registering charities and non-profit organisations, ensuring their compliance with Australian law, and for keeping a public register of registered organisations.

== Purpose and responsibilities ==
The ACNC was created to achieve three fundamental goals towards improving charities and not-for-profits:

- maintain, protect, and enhance public trust and confidence in the Australian not-for-profit sector
- support and sustain a robust, vibrant, independent, and innovative not-for-profit sector
- promote the reduction of unnecessary regulatory obligations on the sector.

As part of this, the ACNC is responsible for managing charity and not-for-profit registrations, supporting organisations in being compliant with Australian regulation, and demonstrating the importance of charities and not-for-profits to the public. In this, the Commission works with state and territory governments and agencies to standardise legislation and regulation across the nation. The ACNC also operates a public register of charities or not-for-profits, the ACNC Charity Register, which lists organisation details, their purpose, as well as financial matters and any regulatory history.

The ACNC also publishes an annual review of the sector, The Australian Charities Report.

=== Fundraising ===
The ACNC is also responsible for overseeing all fundraising activities by Australian charities and profits. Despite this, the Commission can only take regulatory action against organisations in limited circumstances. Instead, most regulatory action is done by state and territory agencies, and some federal agencies (Australian Securities & Investments Commission, Office of the Registrar of Indigenous Corporations, Australian Competition & Consumer Commission and the Australian Taxation Office). When fundraising, organisations have several obligations under Australian Consumer Law. Charities and not-for-profits must not be misleading, deceptive, or demonstrate unconscionable behaviour, nor make false or misleading representations in relation to the supply of 'goods and services'.

== History ==
The ACNC was established under Chapter 5 of the federal Australian Charities and Not-for-profits Commission Act 2012, which received assent on 3 December 2012.

=== Reviews of the Commission ===
On 16 June 2014, a parliamentary report of the Australian Senate's Standing Committees on Economics recommended that the ACNC be abolished to "relieve the regulatory burden from many charities", and instead form a National Centre for Excellence as an "advocate for the sector and a leader in innovation". On 4 March 2016, Minister of Social Services, Christian Porter and Minister for Small Business and Assistant Treasurer, Kelly O'Dwyer, announced that the ACNC would continue. The bill lapsed in April 2016 in the House of Representatives.

In 2017, Treasury completed a review of the legislation enabling the ACNC, five years after the Commission began. Chaired by Patrick McClure, the review was tabled on 22 August 2018 and was welcomed and responded to by the ACNC on 6 March 2020.

=== Commissioner Johns ===
In a move criticised by some charities, the Turnbull government appointed former Labor politician Gary Johns as Commissioner of the ACNC. Johns has been known for criticising the role of charities and the amount of government funding provided to them.

== See also ==
- Australian Taxation Office, the Commission's parent department
- Treasury, the Commission's former parent department
