= Aboriginal Land Rights Act 1983 =

New South Wales legislation

Parliament of New South Wales
- Long title: An Act to repeal the Aborigines Act, 1969, and to make provisions with respect to the land rights of Aborigines, including provisions for, or with respect to Aboriginal Land Councils, the vesting of Land in those Councils, the acquisition of land by or for those Councils and the allocation of funds to or by those Councils; to amend certain other Acts; and to make provisions for certain other Purposes
- Citation: Act No. 42, 1983
- Royal assent: 4 May 1983

Repeals
- Aborigines Act 1969
- Status: In force

The Aboriginal Land Rights Act 1983 (NSW) is an Act of the Parliament of New South Wales which was enacted to return land to Aboriginal peoples through a process of lodging claims for certain Crown lands and the establishment of Aboriginal Land Councils. The Act repealed the Aborigines Act 1969. The originating bill was introduced in the same year it was enacted.

== Background ==
In 1977, a non-statutory NSW Aboriginal Land Council was established as a specialist Aboriginal lobby on land rights representing more than 200 Aboriginal community representatives. The Land Council advocated for change and influenced the New South Wales Government to establish a Select Committee of the Legislative Assembly upon Aborigines in November 1978. The Select Committee inquired into the causes of the socio-economic disadvantages of Aboriginal people, including housing, health, education, employment, welfare and cultural issues; government arrangements in Aboriginal affairs and their effectiveness as well as land rights for Aboriginal people. Key recommendations from the Inquiry included the establishment of a land rights system in New South Wales supported by Aboriginal Regional Land Councils.

== The Act ==
It repealed the Aborigines Act 1969, and introduced land rights for Aboriginal peoples in New South Wales, allowing the Aboriginal Land Councils constituted under the Act to claim land as compensation for historic dispossession of land and to support the social and economic development of Aboriginal communities. The Act also dismantled the Aboriginal Lands Trust that had been established by the Aborigines (Amendment) Act 1973 and held title to all Aboriginal reserves in New South Wales, and property of the Trust was transferred to the Minister for Aboriginal Affairs, to then be transferred to relevant Aboriginal Land Councils. The Act admitted that:

“Land is of spiritual, social, cultural, and economic importance” to Aboriginal peoples, and that, “as a result of past Government decisions the amount of land set aside for Aboriginal persons has been progressively reduced without compensation”.

The Act allowed Aboriginals to lay claim Crown land not otherwise required for any essential purpose. Land councils created by the Act are only allowed to deal with land which is the subject of native title rights and interests after a native title determination has been made.

=== Amendment ===
A number of changes were introduced in the Aboriginal Land Rights Amendment Act 2014. These include the introduction of voluntary Aboriginal Land Agreements, reporting obligations of Local Aboriginal Land Councils, clarification of the functions of Local Aboriginal Land Councils in relation to business enterprises.
