= NSW Aboriginal Land Council =

Peak body of Aboriginal land councils in New South Wales, Australia

Agency overview
- Formed: 1977
- Agency executives: Anne Dennis, Chairperson; Charles Lynch, Deputy Chairperson
- Website: https://alc.org.au/

The NSW Aboriginal Land Council (NSWALC) is the peak representative body of Aboriginal Australians in New South Wales. It has the mandate, under the Aboriginal Land Rights Act 1983 (NSW), to develop land rights among Aboriginal people in New South Wales through its network of 121 Local Aboriginal Land Councils (LALCs). Its functions include the creation of an economic base for Aboriginal communities, as well as the continued passing and enhancement of Aboriginal culture, identity and heritage through the management of traditional sites and other cultural materials within NSW. It acts as an advisor to governments and others to ensure the preservation of Aboriginal land rights.

== Background ==
=== Lands Trust ===
The Aboriginal Lands Trust of New South Wales existed from 1974 to 1983. Members in 1977–79 included George Griffiths, Bill Cohen, Charlie Leon, Lyall Munro, Ossie Cruse (chairman), Ron Riley, Essie Coffey, and Henry Bolt. This was "the first all-Aboriginal democratically elected statutory body to own freehold title to Aboriginal land in Australia", according to Sue Norman (2011).

In February 1982 the NSW Government informed the Aboriginal Lands Trust that the Minister for Aboriginal Affairs, Frank Walker would be responsible for matters relating to it, and that Pat O'Shane had been appointed Secretary to the Minister. Protests ensued, but Aboriginal Land Rights Act 1983 created the NSWALC as a statutory body. This was considered a backwards step by members of the Aboriginal Lands Trust, because significant lands, hunting and gathering rights, and other rights were lost in the new Act.

=== Land Council ===
A non-statutory NSW Aboriginal Land Council was created in 1977, to assist in the protests by Aboriginal people for their land rights. It was the result of a conference held in October 1977 at the Black Theatre in Redfern to discuss land rights. It called for abolition of the Aboriginal Lands Trust (a body of which Lyall Munro Snr was a member, among others), and for recognition of Aboriginal rights to land. The conference resolved to form the new body, and 31 community representatives were elected, who then selected a working committee. This committee comprised: Kevin Cook (chair), Joyce Clague, Kevin Gilbert, Alan Woods, Alice Briggs, Camela Potter, Linda (Trudy) Longbottom, Betty Tighe, Ray Kelly, Jack Campbell, and Ted Thomas. This council was run by volunteers, with no funding, and they lobbied for the passage of the Aboriginal Land Rights Act 1983.

This early body submitted ten land claims to the government between 1977 and 1981, the first being the Terry Hie Hie claim in northwestern NSW. The claims also called for compensation for the damage to their livelihood and loss of land. A Select Committee of the Legislative Assembly upon Aborigines was formed in November 1978, chaired by Maurice Keane. The select committee proposed the formation of an Aboriginal Heritage Commission charged with the protection of Aboriginal sacred sites. It also proposed the formation of a land rights system centred on local community councils, backed by Aboriginal regional land councils, and finally an Aboriginal Land Development Commission.

== Governance and functions ==
The NSWALC is an independent statutory corporation constituted under the Aboriginal Land Rights Act 1983 (ALRA). Nine councillors, representing nine regional areas, are elected every four years. Its statutory functions include compliance with the regulations as well as financial management of New South Wales' network of land councils.

As of 2021 the chairperson of NSWALC Council is Anne Dennis, who represents the North Western Region. Charles Lynch, representing the Northern Region, is the deputy chairperson. Both hold office for a term of two years and are eligible for re-election. The seven other regional councillors are: Abie Wright (Sydney/Newcastle), Leeanne Hampton (Wiradjuri), Grace Toomey (Central), Danny Chapman (South Coast), Peter Smith (Mid North Coast), Ross Hampton (Western), Dallas Donnelly (North Coast).

There is an administrative section, overseen by a chief executive officer. The head office is located in Parramatta, and there are five regional branch offices.

Its mandate includes developing land rights among Aboriginal people in New South Wales, via its network of Local Aboriginal Land Councils, through land acquisition, by land claim or purchase, establishment of commercial businesses and community schemes to create an economic base for Aboriginal communities, as well as the continued passing and enhancement of Aboriginal culture, identity and heritage through the management of traditional sites and other cultural materials within NSW.

The NSWALC's function includes advocacy for policies which benefit of the Aboriginal peoples of New South Wales, including representing them at the United Nations.

== Local Aboriginal Land Councils ==
NSWALC oversees a network of 121 Local Aboriginal Land Councils (LALCs), split into nine regions. LALCs seek to improve, protect and foster the best interests of all Aboriginal persons within their area and other Council members (who may reside elsewhere) more generally. LALCs have functions in relation to: land acquisition, land use and management, Aboriginal culture and heritage, financial stewardship and community benefits schemes. In addition to being a statutory corporation, NSWALC itself has the functions of an Aboriginal Land Council (for the whole of NSW) under Aboriginal Land Rights Act 1983 (NSW).

=== Cummeragunja ===
Cummeragunja, in the Wiradjuri region, is owned and managed by the Cummeragunja Local Aboriginal Land Council, having taken over from the Yorta Yorta Local Aboriginal Land Council since ownership was passed to it in 1984.

=== La Perouse ===
The La Perouse LALC is one of the founding LALCs, established to represent the local Aboriginal people of the La Perouse area in southern Sydney.

== Advocacy ==
After the new targets were announced by the federal government for its new Closing the Gap strategy, NSWALC chief executive James Christian said that the targets were not ambitious enough, in particular the justice goals.
