= The Yacht Harbour Association =

UK trade association

The Yacht Harbour Association (YCHA)
- The Yacht Harbour Association
- Legal status: active
- Purpose: trade association for the development of coastal and inland boating facilities and for the improvement of boating and yachting.
- Official language: English, French
- Website: The Yacht Harbour Association (Official site)

The Yacht Harbour Association (TYHA) is a UK trade association for the development of coastal and inland boating facilities and for the improvement of boating and yachting.

The most important document that is produced by TYHA is the Code of Practice, which contain a list of recommendations covering every aspect of marina construction and operation.

== Members ==
TYHA Gold Anchor Award Scheme logo

=== Three Gold Anchors ===
- Gunwharf Quays, Portsmouth, United Kingdom
- Ocean Village, Southampton, United Kingdom

=== Four Gold Anchors ===
- Anchorage Marina, Corlette, Port Stephens, New South Wales Australia
- Bray Marina, Bray, United Kingdom
- Bristol City Docks, Bristol, United Kingdom
- Brundall Bay Marina, Norwich, United Kingdom
- Cobbs Quay Marina, Poole, United Kingdom
- Cowes Yacht Haven, Cowes, United Kingdom
- Dart Marina, River Dart, Dartmouth, United Kingdom
- De Brink Yachting, Kerkdriel, Netherlands
- Eastwood Marina, Norwich, United Kingdom
- Falmouth Marina, Falmouth, United Kingdom
- Hartlepool Marina, Hartlepool, United Kingdom
- Jachthaven Wetterwille, Loosdrecht, Netherlands
- Milford Marina, Milford Haven, United Kingdom
- Portishead Quays Marina, Portishead, United Kingdom
- Queen Anne's Battery Marina, Plymouth, United Kingdom
- Royal Harbour Marina Ramsgate, Ramsgate, United Kingdom
- Saint Quay Port D'Armor, Saint-Quay-Portrieux
- Shepperton Marina, Shepperton, United Kingdom
- Soldiers Point, Port Stephens, New South Wales Australia
- Tewkesbury Marina, Tewkesbury, United Kingdom
- Thames and Kennet Marina, Reading, United Kingdom
- Tidemill Yacht Harbour, River Deben, Woodbridge, United Kingdom
- Tollesbury Marina, River Blackwater, Tollesbury, United Kingdom
- Upton Marina, Upton-upon-Severn, United Kingdom

=== Five Gold Anchors ===
- Atakoy Marina, Atakoy, Istanbul, Turkey
- Bangor Marina, Bangor, County Down, United Kingdom
- Brighton Marina, Brighton, United Kingdom
- Brixham Marina, Brixham, United Kingdom
- Carrickfergus Marina, Carrickfergus, United Kingdom
- Chatham Maritime Marina, River Medway, United Kingdom
- Chichester Marina, Chichester, United Kingdom
- Clearwater Bay Golf and Country Club Marina, Clearwater Bay, Hong Kong
- Conwy Quays Marina, Conwy, United Kingdom
- Discovery Bay Marina Club, Lantau Island, Hong Kong
- D-Marin Turgutreis Marina, Turgutries, Bodrum, Turkey
- Dover Marina, Dover, United Kingdom
- Ecesaray Marina and Resort, Muğla, Turkey
- Gillingham Marina, River Medway, Gillingham, United Kingdom
- Hafan Pwllheli, Pwllheli, United Kingdom
- Hamble Point Marina, Southampton, United Kingdom
- Harleyford Marina, Marlow, United Kingdom
- Hythe Marina Village, Southampton, United Kingdom
- Ipswich Haven Marina, Ipswich, United Kingdom
- Jachthaven Naarden, Naarden, United Kingdom
- Jersey Harbours, Saint Helier, Jersey
- Kemer Turkiz Marina, Antalya, Turkey
- Lowestoft Haven Marina, Lowestoft, United Kingdom
- Marina de Lagos, Lagos, Algarve, Portugal
- Marina de Vilamoura, Vilamoura, Algarve, Portugal
- Marina Hindmarsh Island, Goolwa, South Australia
- Marina Muiderzand, Almere, Netherlands
- Marmaris Yacht Marina, Muğla, Marmaris, Turkey
- Marti Marina, Muğla, Turkey
- Mayflower Marina, Plymouth, United Kingdom
- Mercury Yacht Harbour, River Hamble, United Kingdom
- Milta Bodrum Marina, Bodrum, Muğla, Turkey
- Nieuwpoort Yacht Haven, Nieuwpoort, Belgium
- Northney Marina Hayling Island, United Kingdom
- Nottingham Castle Marina, United Kingdom
- One15 Marina Club Singapore, Singapore
- Penarth Quays Marina, Penarth, United Kingdom
- Penton Hook Marina, Chertsey, United Kingdom
- Port Bodrum Yalikavak Marina, Mecidiyekoy, Istanbul, Turkey
- Port Gocek Marina, Fethiye/Muğla, Turkey
- Port Hamble Marina, Southampton, United Kingdom
- Port Solent Marina, Port Solent, Portsmouth Harbour, United Kingdom
- Raffles Marina Singapore
- Royal Phuket Marina Muang, Phuket, Thailand
- Royal Prince Alfred Yacht Club, Newport, New South Wales, Australia
- Royal Quays Marina, North Shields, United Kingdom
- Salterns Marina, Poole Harbour, United Kingdom
- Shamrock Quay Marina, Southampton, United Kingdom
- Sovereign Harbour Marina, Eastbourne, United Kingdom
- Swansea Marina Swansea, United Kingdom
- Torquay Marina Torquay, United Kingdom
- Windsor Marina Windsor, United Kingdom
- Woolverstone Marina, River Orwell, Ipswich, United Kingdom
