= Lemon Tree Passage =

Lemon Tree Passage may refer to:

- Lemon Tree Passage, New South Wales
- Lemon Tree Passage (film)
