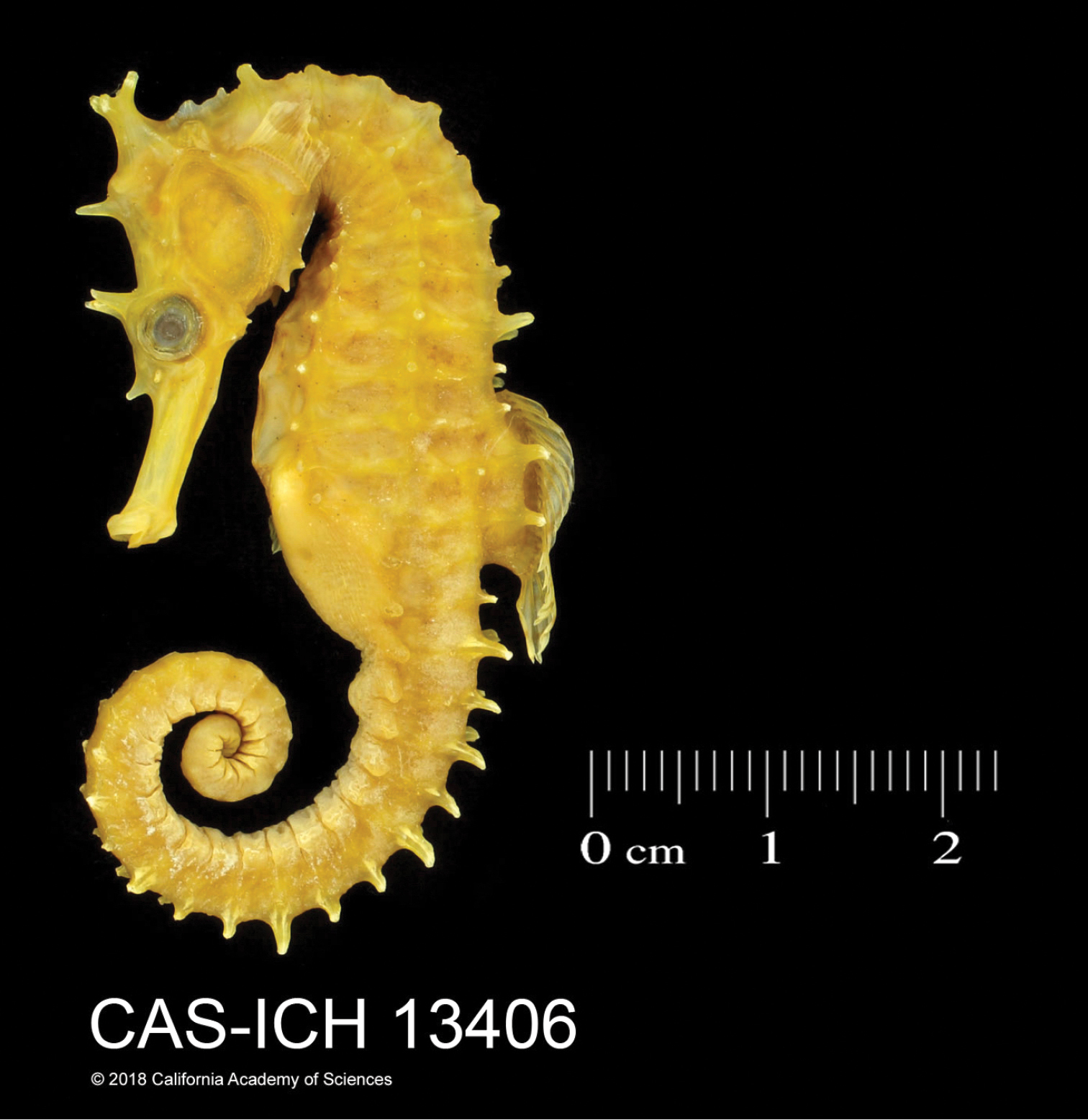

Scientific classification
- Kingdom: Animalia
- Phylum: Chordata
- Class: Actinopterygii
- Order: Syngnathiformes
- Family: Syngnathidae
- Genus: Hippocampus
- Species: H. procerus

Binomial name
- Hippocampus procerus Kuiter, 2001

= Hippocampus procerus =

Species of fish

Hippocampus procerus, the high-crown seahorse, is a synonym of Hippocampus whitei, Bleeker, 1855.
