= Lilliput, Dorset =

District of Poole, Dorset, England

Coordinates: 50.70°N 1.94°W

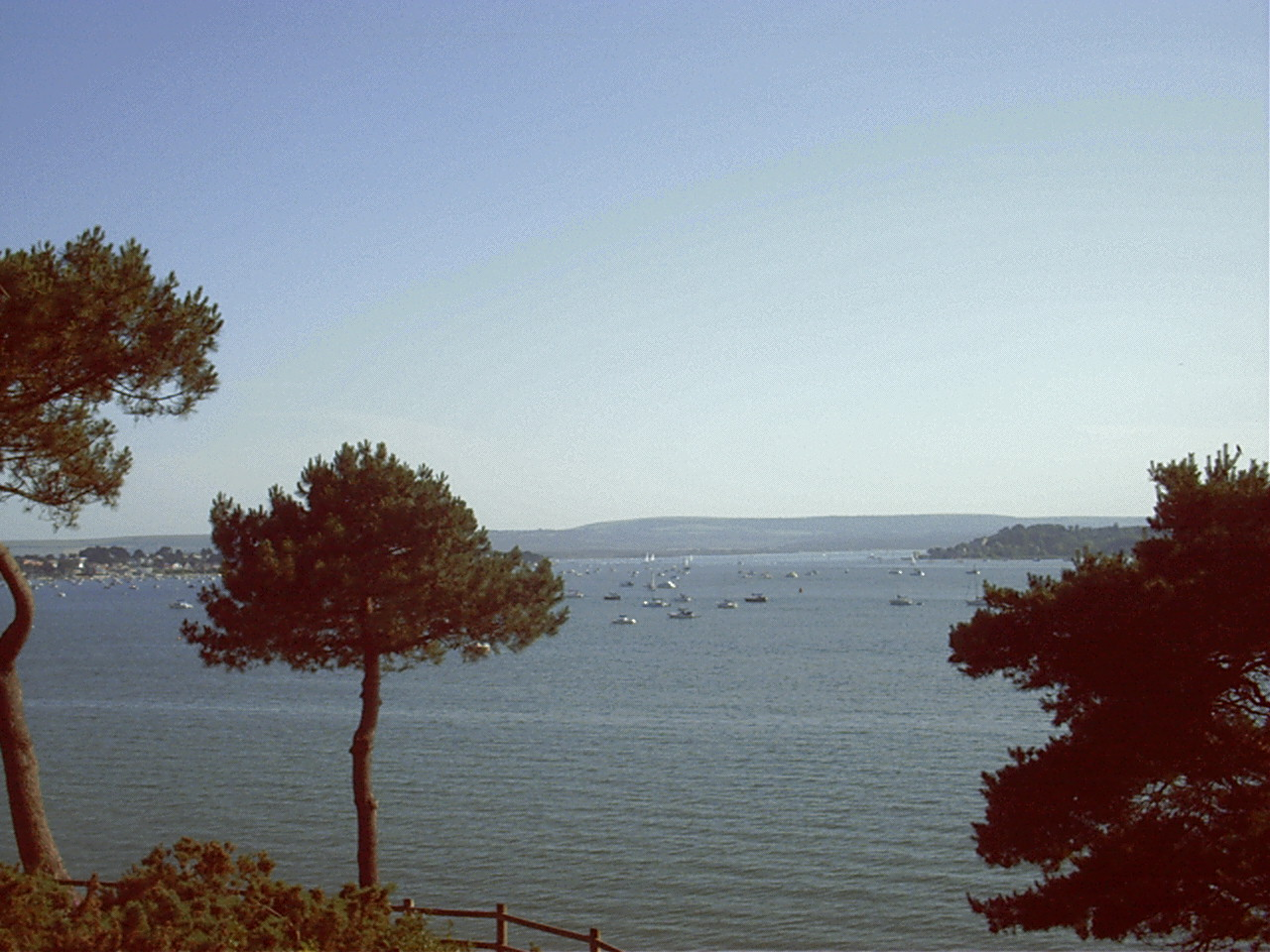
View from Evening Hill, Lilliput

Lilliput is an area of Poole in Dorset, England. It borders Sandbanks, Canford Cliffs, Lower Parkstone, and Whitecliff and has a shoreline within Poole Harbour with views of Brownsea Island and the Purbeck Hills.

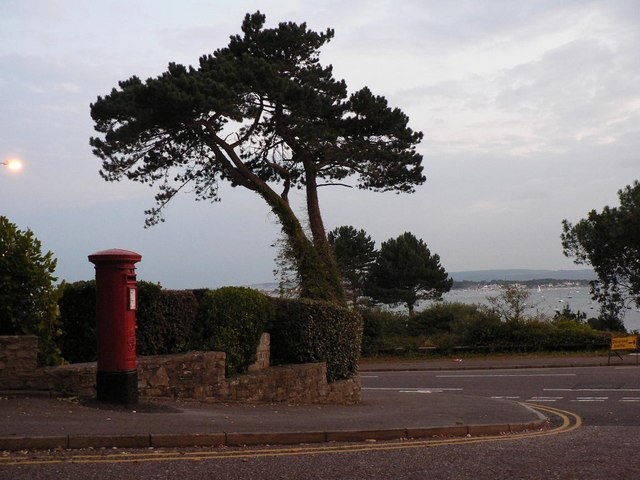
Post box in Lilliput

Well known residents have included modernist writer Mary Butts, a very young John le Carré and disc-jockey Tony Blackburn. Impresario Fred Karno who popularised the custard-pie-in-the-face comedy routine spent his last years in the village as a part-owner of an off-licence, bought with financial help from Charlie Chaplin, and died here in 1941 aged 75.

Lilliput is home to Evening Hill at the edge of Parkstone Bay, Salterns Marina, a hotel 'Salterns Harbourside', the Lilliput C of E Infants First School, and an Anglican church 'The Church of the Holy Angels'.

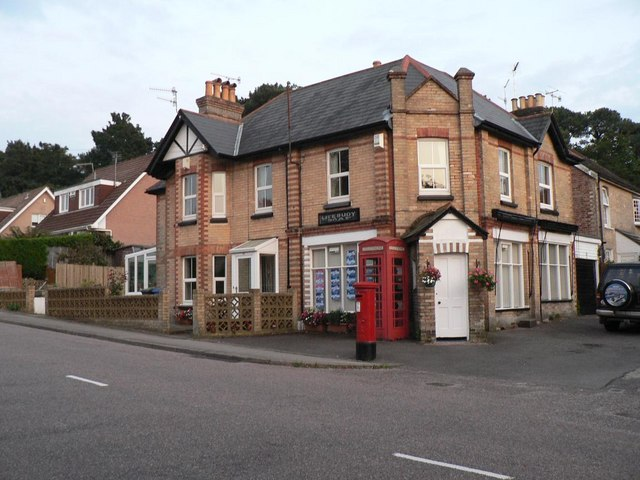
The old post office

== History ==
Brownsea Island stands opposite Lilliput's harbour foreshore and is famous as the birthplace of Baden Powell's Scouting movement. Lilliput itself was host to a number of early scouting camps. During the Second World War at one stage it provided Britain's only civilian air route: Poole Harbour was temporary home to the Imperial Airways/BOAC flying boat fleet, which had its passenger HQ at Salterns Marina.

=== Development ===
The area occupying the northern shore of Poole Harbour was often referred to by the Victorians as "Parkstone-on-Sea". Mary Butts wrote about the local landscape and her childhood in one of the old mansions at the turn of the twentieth century in her autobiography The Crystal Cabinet: my childhood at Salterns (1937). Her great-grandfather had been a principal patron of the English romantic poet and artist William Blake, and her Lilliput home housed a large collection of Blake paintings (now in Tate Britain). The autobiography took its title from one of Blake's poems. She adored the area and was critical of the kind of development then taking place in Lilliput and Poole–Parkstone–Bournemouth, which she thought soulless, and far from the "garden city" it could be. Aside from an enclave behind Evening Hill, a local beauty spot with panoramic views over Poole Harbour, modern development started in the later 1920s as more of the older estates were sold for suburban projects. A number of distinctive art-deco homes were built, including the landmark Salterns Court building at the new shopping parade.

Before its development as a residential and recreational area there had been industrial projects at Salterns, which had been the area's local name. Some claim a connection to Jonathan Swift and his novel Gulliver's Travels, and there are local streets which have associated names. The name "Lilliput" probably derives from Lilliput House, an old country mansion built near Evening Hill, which may have been owned by renowned smuggler Isaac Gulliver or one of his relatives. The new century

The last 25 years has seen many new property development projects, especially in water frontage or harbour view locations, and often earlier buildings have been replaced entirely.

The dilemma of development is described in The Dorset Village Book:

"much of Lilliput's woodland has disappeared, the sound of saws rasping through the trunks as prominent as the speeding traffic along the road to Sandbanks. Almost every inch of this beautiful place has been sacrificed to the builders and even parts of the cliff-face have been built on. Who can blame anyone for wanting to come here to live, to enjoy the rich sunsets over Wareham Channel, to smell the sweet cool breezes which waft in from the bay, and to marvel at the view across Poole Harbour and Brownsea Island. To many, this is paradise."

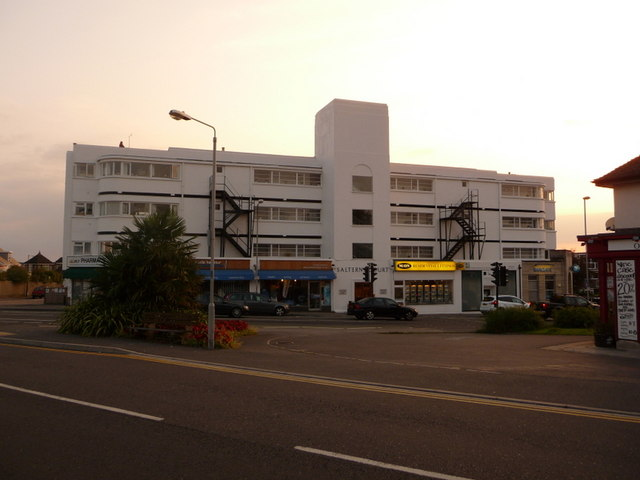
Salterns Court, Lilliput Square
