= Tanilba Bay, New South Wales =

Tanilba Bay
- Town
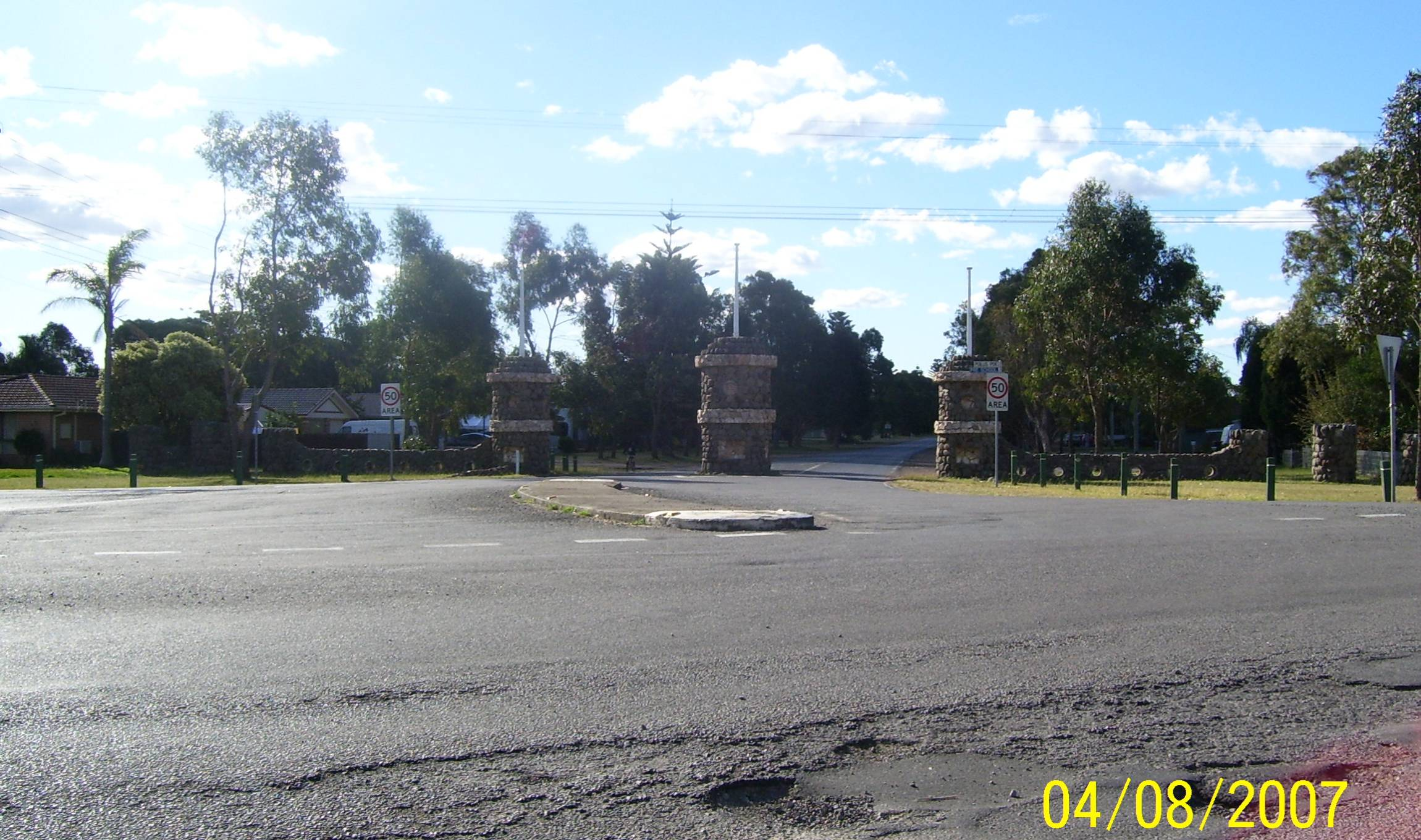
- The distinctive entrance to Tanilba Bay from Lemon Tree Passage Road

- Interactive map of Tanilba Bay
- Coordinates: 32°44′14″S 151°59′54″E
- Country: Australia
- State: New South Wales
- Region: Hunter
- LGA: Port Stephens Council
- Location: 191 km (119 mi) NNE of Sydney; 44 km (27 mi) NNE of Newcastle; 29 km (18 mi) ENE of Raymond Terrace
- Established: 1831

Government
  - State electorate: Port Stephens
  - Federal division: Paterson

Area (Note: Area calculation is based on 1:100000 map 9232 NEWCASTLE. The area presented is that of the whole suburb. The residential portion of the suburb is only 1.9 km^{2} (0.7 sq mi) or 14.6% of the total area.)
  - Total: 13 km^{2} (5.0 sq mi)
- Elevation (Note: Elevation data as shown on 1:100000 map 9232 NEWCASTLE and 1:25000 map 93324S PORT STEPHENS.): 3 m (9.8 ft)

Population
  - Total: 3,237 (2021 census)
  - Density: 249/km^{2} (640/sq mi) (Note: This is the average density of the whole suburb. However, approximately 11.1 km^{2} (4.3 sq mi) (85.4%) of the suburb is uninhabited or consists of non-residential zones at the edge of the suburb and the average population density in the inhabited portion of the suburb is much higher at approximately 1,537/km^{2} (3,980/sq mi).)
- Time zone: UTC+10 (AEST)
  - Summer (DST): UTC+11 (AEDT)
- Postcode: 2319
- County: Gloucester
- Parish: Sutton
- Mean max temp: 27.3 °C (81.1 °F)
- Mean min temp: 8.4 °C (47.1 °F)
- Annual rainfall: 1,348.9 mm (53.11 in)
Localities around Tanilba Bay
Port Stephens	Port Stephens	Port Stephens
Oyster Cove, Salt Ash	Tanilba Bay	Mallabula
Salt Ash	Tilligerry Creek	Tilligerry Creek

Tanilba Bay is a suburb of the Port Stephens local government area in the Hunter Region of New South Wales, Australia. It is located on the Tilligerry Peninsula adjacent to the bay from which it got its name. "Tanilba" is said to mean "place of white flowers" in a local Indigenous language, presumably a reference to the flannel flowers which formerly thrived in the area. At the 2021 census Tanilba Bay had a population of 3,237. Tanilba Bay Public School is a co-ed government primary school located at 1A King Albert Avenue.

== Tanilba House ==
The centerpiece of this small town is Tanilba House, on Caswell Crescent, which is listed on the New South Wales State Heritage Register along with The Temple of the Stork nearby. It is one of Australia's oldest buildings and the oldest in Port Stephens. In 1831 Lieut William Caswell, Royal Navy, received a land grant of 20.2 hectares (50 acres), along with an assignment of convicts who cleared the land and built Tanilba House from locally quarried quartz porphry stone and lime mortar made on the property from oyster shells. A small gaol was also built on the southern side of the house. ten acres (4.0 hectares) on the eastern side of the hill was used as a vineyard soon after the house was built. An olive tree planted in the vineyard survives to this day and is heritage listed. A bunya pine, the wisteria covered pergola and two Port Jackson figs are also specifically listed.

William and Susan Caswell had 11 children in total but two young sons died at the house. The Caswells were impacted by drought and deprived of most of their workforce due to the ceasing of transportation of convict labour by the English government and left the house in 1840s. The house was left uninhabited and became derelict until the late 1800s. Significant restoration and repair of the house was conducted by Elizabeth Holmes in the 1890s using the same builder who built Stanley Park in Fullerton Cove. In 1897 it was sold to Elizabeth Holmes who started restoration works. In 1905 W J Ebbeck purchased the property as a holiday home to host fishing parties. In 1913 it was purchased by Walter W Cliff.

In 1931 Tanilba House was owned by Henry Halloran who designed such structures as "The Temple", which is behind Tanilba House and which is visible on the main road leading to the house, the stone circular driveway, a wishing chair and other decorative stone structures on the property plus the elaborate gates at what were then the north and south entrances to the town. The stone for these structures was quarried locally from Mallabula. The northern gates are known as the water gates as they were designed to welcome visitors approaching from the water. Due to expansion the gates now stand inside the what were originally the suburb limits.

In the 1950s it became a guest house and riding school. The property was saved from demolition by the Oberland family who purchased the property in the 1960s. In 1980 the state government placed a permanent conservation order. Helen Taylor lived in the property for the 1980s until her death in 2015. She staged exhibitions, plays, poetry reading and concerts as well as opening the house to the public as a museum. In 1989, as part of the Margaret Henry oral history, was an interview about Tanilba House and its first owners. In 2017 the current owners Glenn Short and Deirdre Hall purchased the property and started to restore it.

Tanilba House and "The Temple"

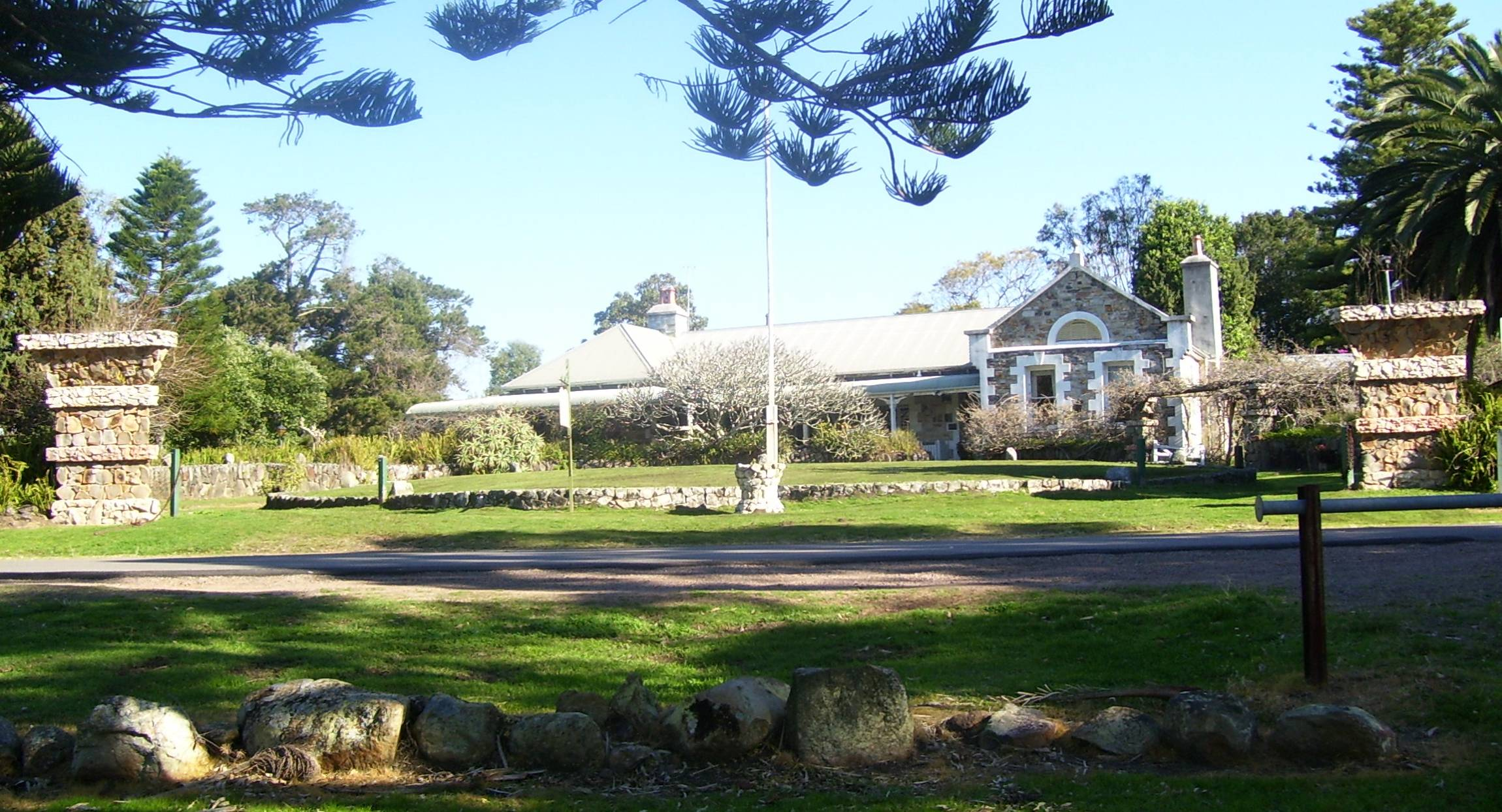
Tanilba House

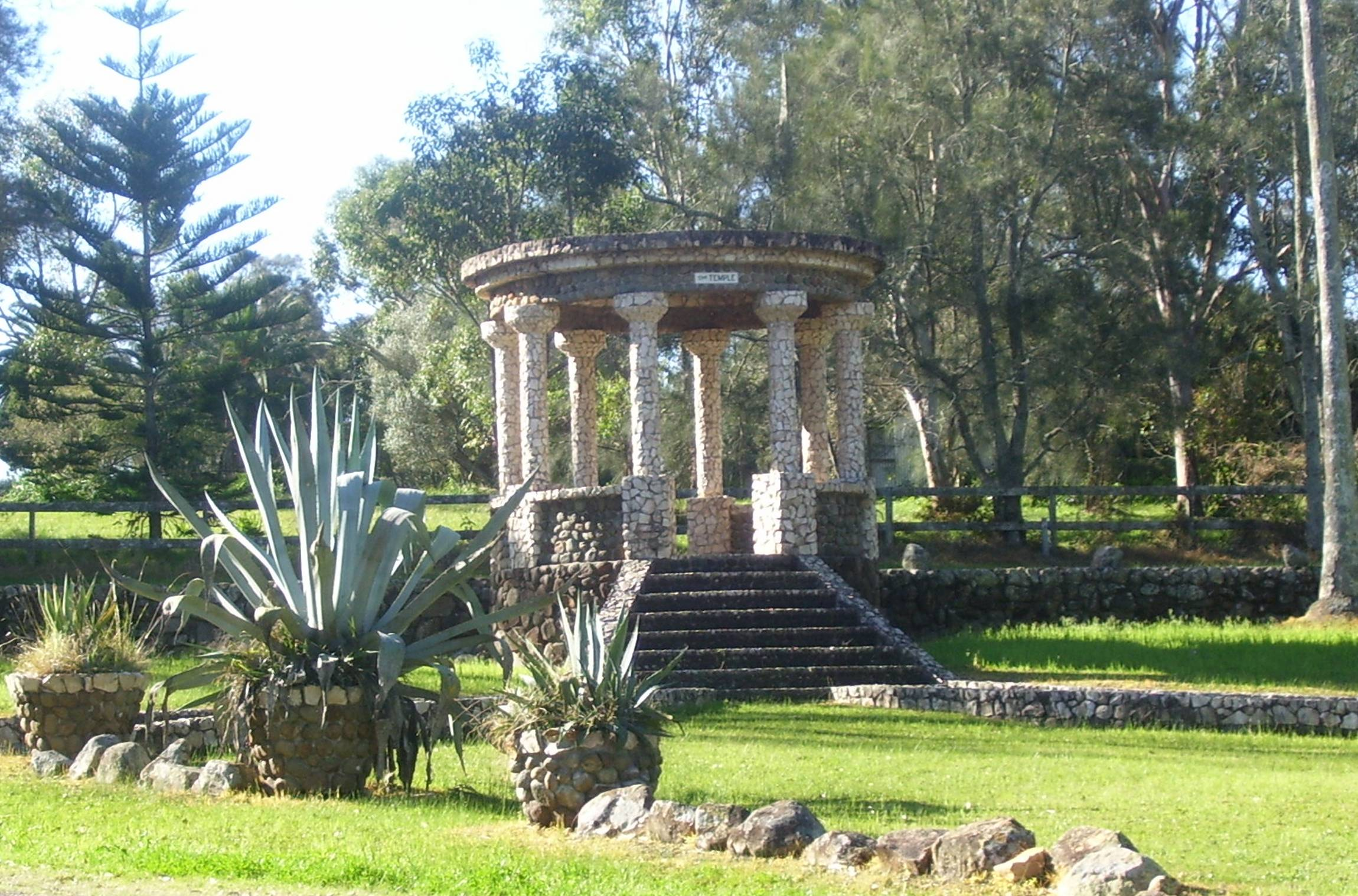
The Temple

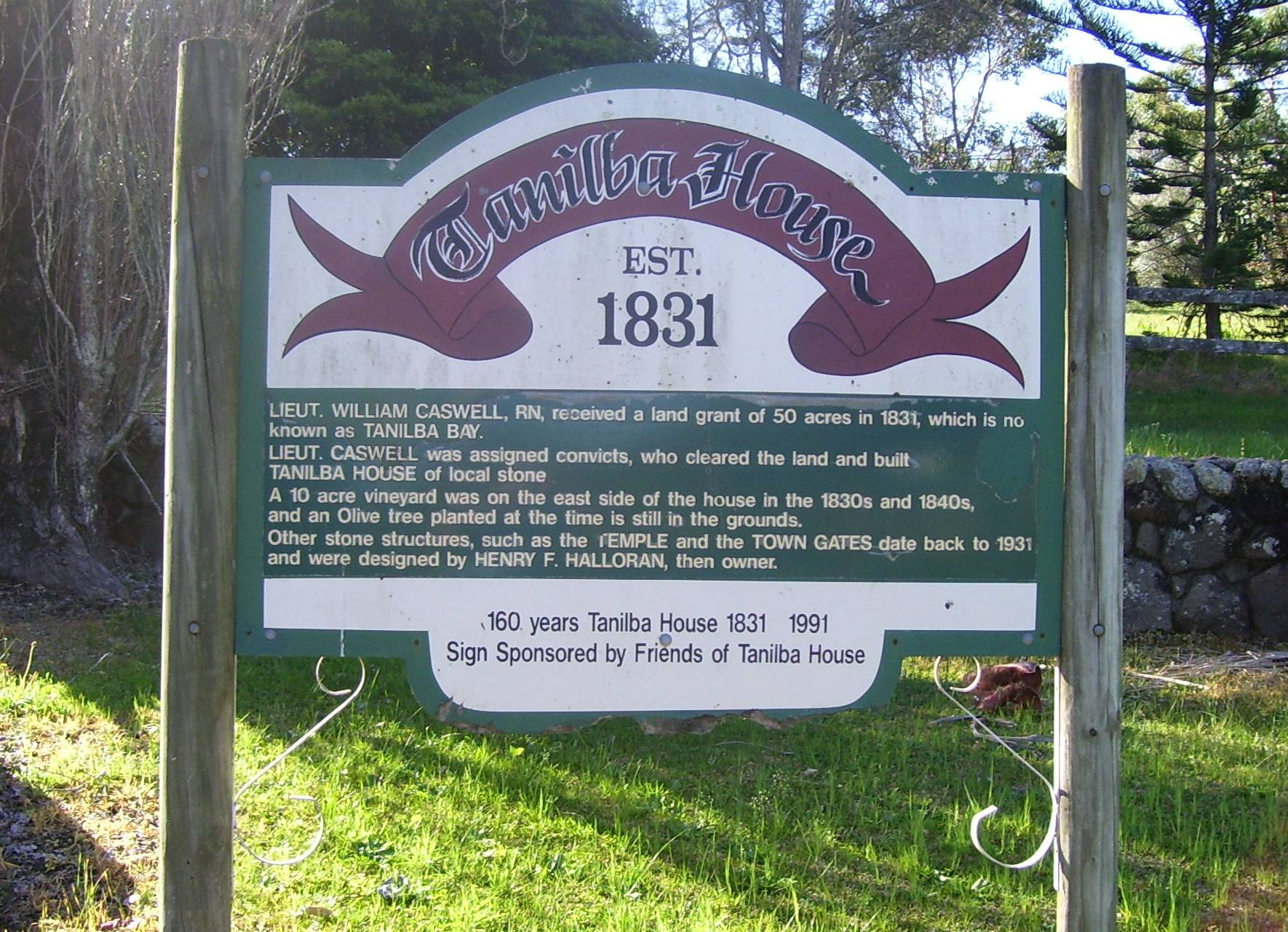
Information sign adjacent to "The Temple"

== The main beach ==
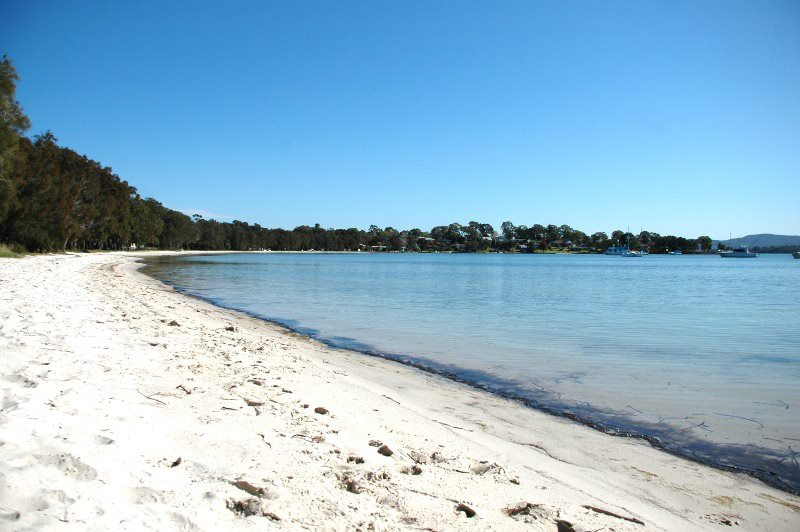
Located along the western end of the bay is a large sandy beach.

The main beach in Tanilba Bay is located on the southern side of Port Stephens and runs from east to west. The eastern part of the beach accessed along a board walk with steps down to small inlets that provide access to the beach under the protection of native trees that are known for their koala population. The centre and western parts of the beach are flanked by various picnic areas and parks and boat ramps with the westernmost end having a wide stretch of sandy beach. At very low tide the sandy flats are exposed and on occasions during the high tide the water covers all the sand. The bay is protected from southerly winds which makes it a popular place for water sports such as skiing.
