= Port Stephens (New South Wales) =

Estuarine lake in New South Wales, Australia

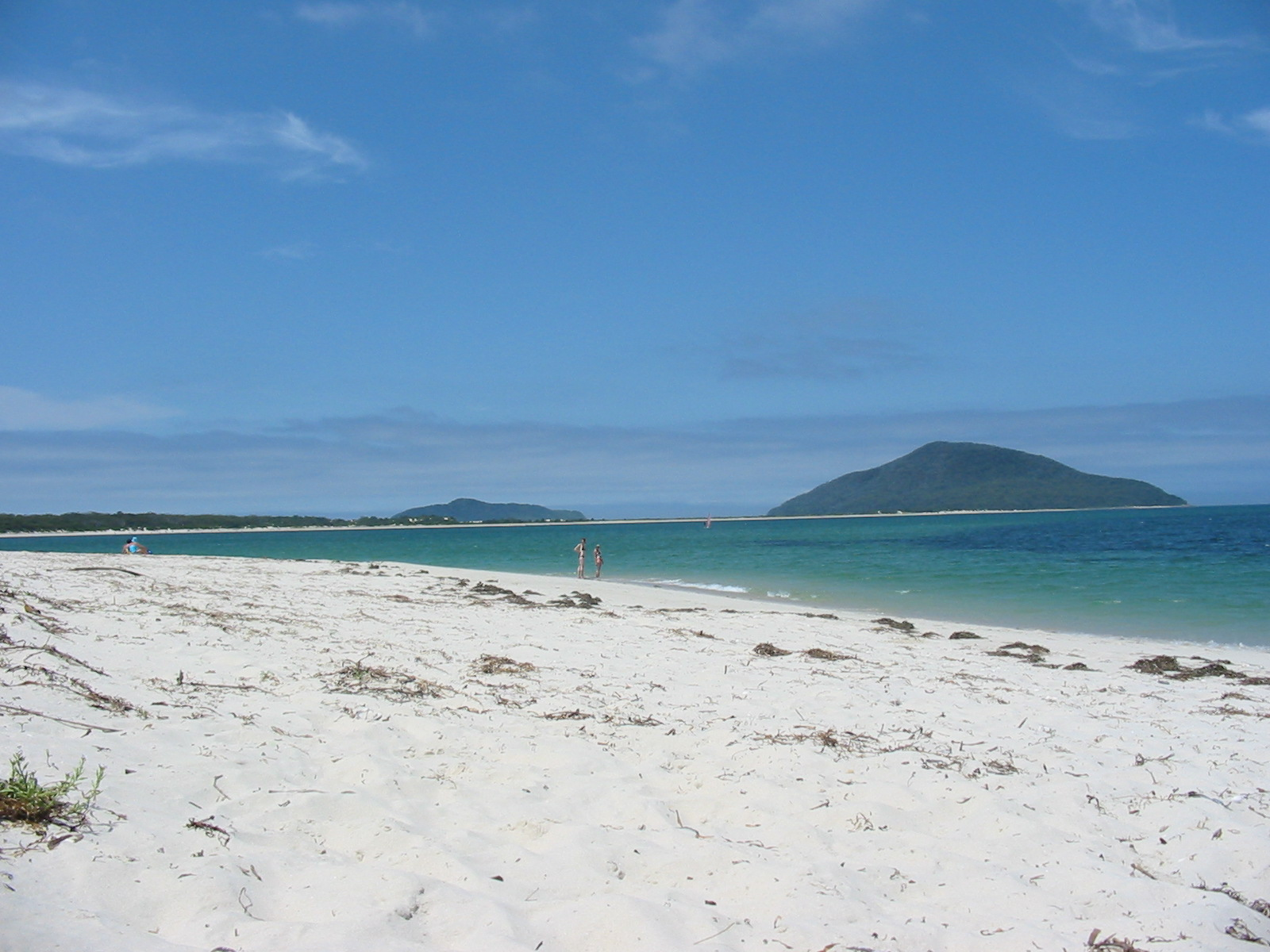
- Looking towards Yacaaba, the northern headland at the entrance of Port Stephens, along Jimmys Beach from Winda Woppa

- Location within New South Wales
- Location: Hunter, Mid North Coast, New South Wales
- Coordinates: 32°41′57″S 152°7′26″E
- Lake type: An open tide dominated drowned valley estuary
- Primary inflows: Karuah River, Myall River, Tilligerry Creek
- Primary outflows: Tasman Sea, South Pacific Ocean
- Catchment area: 296.8 square kilometres (114.6 sq mi)
- Basin countries: Australia
- Designation: Marine park
- Max. length: 24 km (15 mi)
- Max. width: 6.5 km (4.0 mi)
- Surface area: 134 square kilometres (52 sq mi)
- Average depth: 14.1 metres (46 ft)
- Water volume: 1,741,516.5 megalitres (61,501.07×10^{6} cu ft)
- Shore length^{1}: 113 km (70 mi)
- Surface elevation: 0 m (0 ft)
- Islands: 16
- Settlements: Anna Bay, Bobs Farm, Bundabah, Carrington, Corlette, Hawks Nest, Karuah, Lemon Tree Passage, Mallabula, Nelson Bay, North Arm Cove, Oyster Cove, Pindimar, Salamander Bay, Soldiers Point, Shoal Bay, Swan Bay, Tahlee, Tanilba Bay, Taylors Beach, Tea Gardens
- Website: NSW Planning & Environment webpage
- ^{1} Shore length is not a well-defined measure.

Port Stephens, an open youthful tide-dominated drowned-valley estuary, is a large natural harbour of about 134 square kilometres (52 sq mi) in the Hunter and Mid North Coast regions of New South Wales, Australia.

Port Stephens lies within the Port Stephens–Great Lakes Marine Park and is situated about 160 kilometres (99 mi) north-east of Sydney. The harbour lies wholly within the local government area of Port Stephens; although its northern shoreline forms the boundary between the Port Stephens and MidCoast local government areas.

According to the 2006 census, more than 26,000 people lived within 3 km (1.9 mi) of its 113 km (70 mi) long shoreline and more than 32,000 lived within 10 km (6 mi).

== Geography ==
Port Stephens is formed through the confluence of the Myall and Karuah rivers, Tilligerry Creek, and the Tasman Sea of the South Pacific Ocean. The lower port has a predominantly marine ecology and the upper port an estuarine ecology. The area to the east of Port Stephens comprises the Tomago/Tomaree/Stockton sand beds.

A narrow entrance between two striking hills of volcanic origin marks the opening of Port Stephens to the sea. The southern headland, Tomaree or South Head, rises to 161 metres (528 ft) above mean sea level (AMSL) while Yacaaba, the northern headland, is 210 m (690 ft) AMSL. The harbour is mostly shallow and sandy but contains sufficient deep water to accommodate large vessels. After its recovery from the wreck site in 1974 the bow of the MV Sygna, a 53,000 tonnes (52,163 long tons) Norwegian bulk carrier that was shipwrecked on Stockton Beach earlier that year, was moored in Port Stephens, at Salamander Bay, for almost two years.

With an area of about 134 square kilometres (52 sq mi), Port Stephens is larger than Sydney Harbour. Port Stephens extends about 24 km (15 mi) inland from the Tasman Sea and at its widest point, between Tanilba Bay and Tahlee, it is 6.5 km (4 mi) across. The narrowest point is between Soldiers Point and Pindimar where the distance is only 1.1 km (0.7 mi). Between Nelson Bay and Tea Gardens, in the most well known section of the port, it is 3.8 km (2.4 mi) wide.

The Karuah River drains into Port Stephens at its north-western corner. The Myall River (through the Myall Lakes) drains into the port on its northern shore, about 5.7 km (3.5 mi) from the mouth of the port. Twelve Mile Creek drains into the port's south-western corner.

The southern shore of the port is divided into two distinct areas known as the Tomaree and Tilligerry peninsulas. These are separated by Tilligerry Creek, a watercourse covering about 7.7 km^{2} (3.0 sq mi), which drains the land in the low-lying areas of Salt Ash, Bobs Farm, Tanilba Bay and Mallabula. While the Tilligerry Peninsula is geographically closer to major centres such as Sydney and Newcastle, it lacks the urban development that has occurred on the much larger (25 km^{2} (10 sq mi) vs 115 km^{2} (44 sq mi) respectively) Tomaree peninsula. Although Lemon Tree Passage, on the Tilligerry Peninsula, and Soldiers Point, on the Tomaree Peninsula, are only 2.9 km (1.8 mi) from each other, physical separation of the suburbs by Port Stephens and Tilligerry Creek results in them being almost 40 km (25 mi) from each other by road.

The town of Karuah, at the north-western corner of the port near the mouth of the Karuah River, experiences similar geographical separation from the Tilligerry Peninsula. Despite being only 7.7 km (4.8 mi) from Tanilba Bay, the road distance between the two suburbs is 40 km (25 mi).

The western shore and the western part of the northern shore of the port are largely undeveloped with the flora ranging from scrubland in the west to the large tracts of bushland which are present along most of the northern shore. Closer to the mouth of the port, at and near Winda Woppa, sandy beaches are prevalent. These extend from Jimmys Beach, near the mouth of the port, to the mouth of the Myall River, a distance of about 5.2 km (3.2 mi). Just outside the mouth of the port lie the two small insular nature reserves of Cabbage Tree Island and Boondelbah Island, both dedicated to the conservation of the threatened Gould's petrel, and with no public access.

== History ==
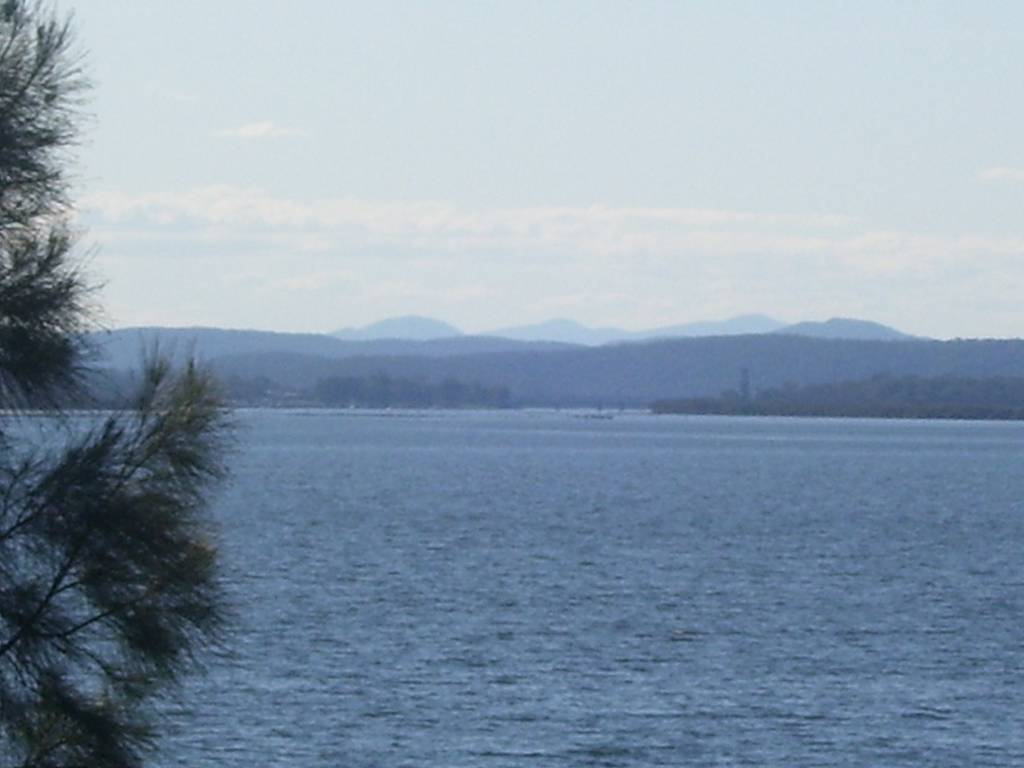
Entrance of Karuah River into Port Stephens (seen from Tanilba Bay, about 7.7 km (4.8 mi) away)

The Worimi are the traditional owners for the area which is now called Port Stephens and the wider region is home to numerous sites of deep cultural significance to the Worimi.

The port was named by Captain Cook when he passed by on 11 May 1770, honouring Sir Philip Stephens, who was Secretary to the Admiralty. Stephens was a personal friend of Cook and had recommended him for command of the voyage. It seems Cook's initial choice of name had actually been Point Keppel and Keppel Bay, but instead he used Keppel Bay later.

The first ship to enter the port was the Salamander, a ship of the Third Fleet that later gave the suburb of Salamander Bay its name, in 1791. In that same year escaped convicts, then known as 'bolters', discovered coal in the area.

In 1795 the crew of HMS Providence discovered a group of escaped convicts living with the Worimi people. Port Stephens became a popular haven for escaped convicts and so in 1820 a garrison of soldiers was established at what is now known as Soldiers Point.

The 63-tonne (62-long-ton) cutter Lambton, commanded by Captain James Corlette, began shipping timber and wool out of the port in 1816. The suburb of Corlette was named after the captain.

Port Stephens has rather poor soil for the most part, and has limited agricultural potential. For this reason, no large towns developed there historically and it was never developed as a significant port. The major city and port of Newcastle developed at the mouth of the Hunter River, about 45 km (28 mi) south-west of Port Stephens.

=== Australian Agricultural Company ===
In 1826, the Australian Agricultural Company was granted one million acres at Port Stephens to establish the colony's first Merino sheep station. Overseen by manager Robert Dawson, the "run" extended from the Karuah River valley, to the Gloucester flats, including all of the coastal region north to the Manning River. Wool produced there was to be exported to Britain to ensure a cheap reliable supply of British wool which at that time was being outpriced by German imports.

However, the sheep did not thrive in such a humid coastal environment. In 1833, the Company sought and was granted more suitable land inland, the Warrah Estate, west of Murrurundi, and Goonoo Goonoo estate, along with the left bank of the Peel River to the south of present-day Tamworth, New South Wales. The Australian Agricultural Company was permitted to retain mineral rights to the Port Stephens area. The pioneering settlers of the area were ordered to leave and were paid little from the company for their properties.

=== 20th century ===
In 1918, some Greek fishermen at Port Stephens recounted to ichthyologist David G. Stead, in that year, that their heavy crayfish pots had been towed away by an enormous, ghostly-white shark. Upon seeing it, the men immediately weighed anchor and fled back to port, refusing to go out to sea again for some time.

In the year 1918 I recorded the sensation that had been caused among the "outside" crayfish men at Port Stephens, when, for several days, they refused to go to sea to their regular fishing grounds in the vicinity of Broughton Island. The men had been at work on the fishing grounds---which lie in deep water---when an immense shark of almost unbelievable proportions put in an appearance, lifting pot after pot containing many crayfishes, and taking, as the men said, "pots, mooring lines and all". These crayfish pots, it should be mentioned, were about 3 feet 6 inches in diameter and frequently contained from two to three dozen good-sized crayfish each weighing several pounds. The men were all unanimous that this shark was something the like of which they had never dreamed of.

One fisherman claimed the alleged creature was 115 feet long.

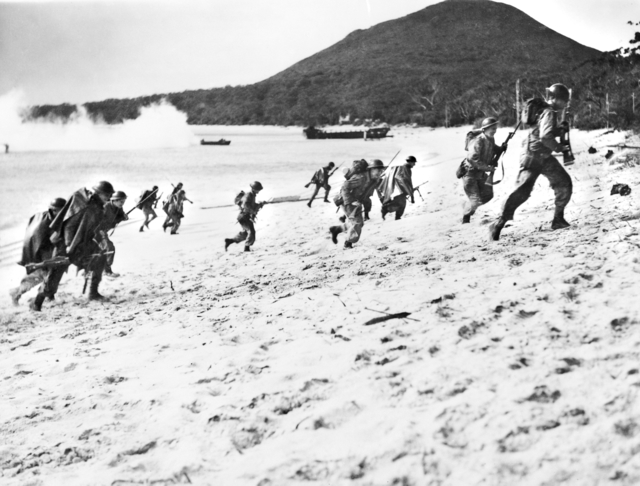
Troops and landing craft crews training at HMAS Assault during World War II

In 1920 there was a push for Port Stephens to be the capital city of a new state in a proposal originating from the country newspaper The Daily Observer. The proposal was the Observer's editor Victor Thompson's idea in response to continuing rural Australian antipathy at the Sydney-centralised funding and governance that many rural newspapers claimed had neglected to aid rural Australian towns.

In World War II, the remoteness and lack of any significant civilian population led to the Royal Australian Navy establishing HMAS Assault, an amphibious landing training establishment, at Nelson Bay. The sick bay from HMAS Assault still stands and is used by the Port Stephens Community Arts Centre.

A number of small towns developed around the port as fishing, holiday and retirement communities. Since the 1970s, with improved road access from Sydney, and the increasing popularity of coastal retirement lifestyles, there has been major expansion of these towns.

=== Port Stephens–Great Lakes Marine Park ===
On 1 December 2005 the Port Stephens–Great Lakes Marine Park was established pursuant to the Marine Parks Act, 1997 (NSW). The park comprises about 97,200 hectares (240,000 acres) and includes all of Port Stephens, the Karuah and Myall rivers and all their creeks and tributaries under tidal influence. The park was established to protect the wide variety of sea life that inhabit the port and nearby coastal areas of the Tasman Sea from just south of Forster to the northern end of Stockton Beach.

Examples of some of the sea life that inhabits Port Stephens

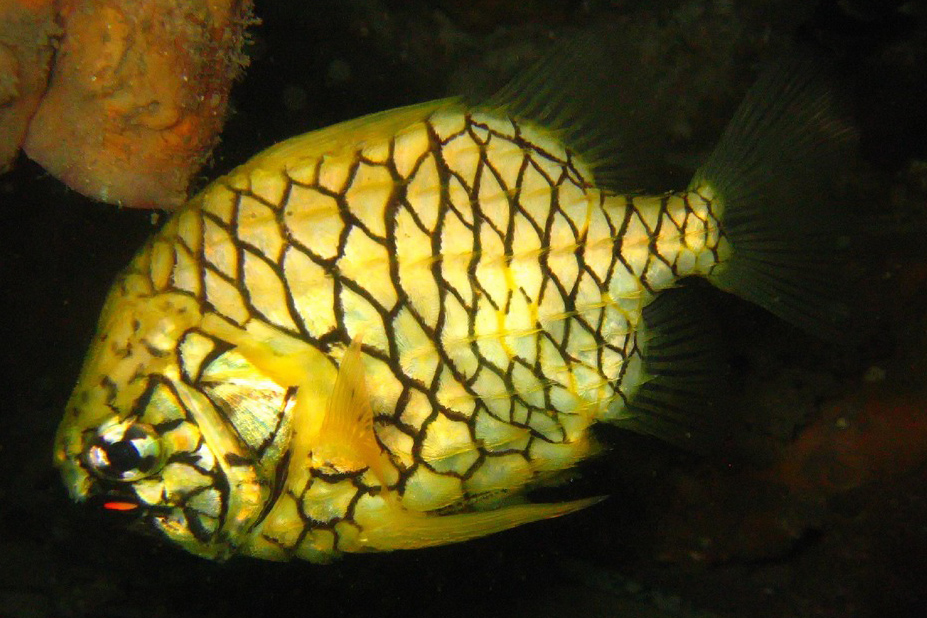
Pineapplefish

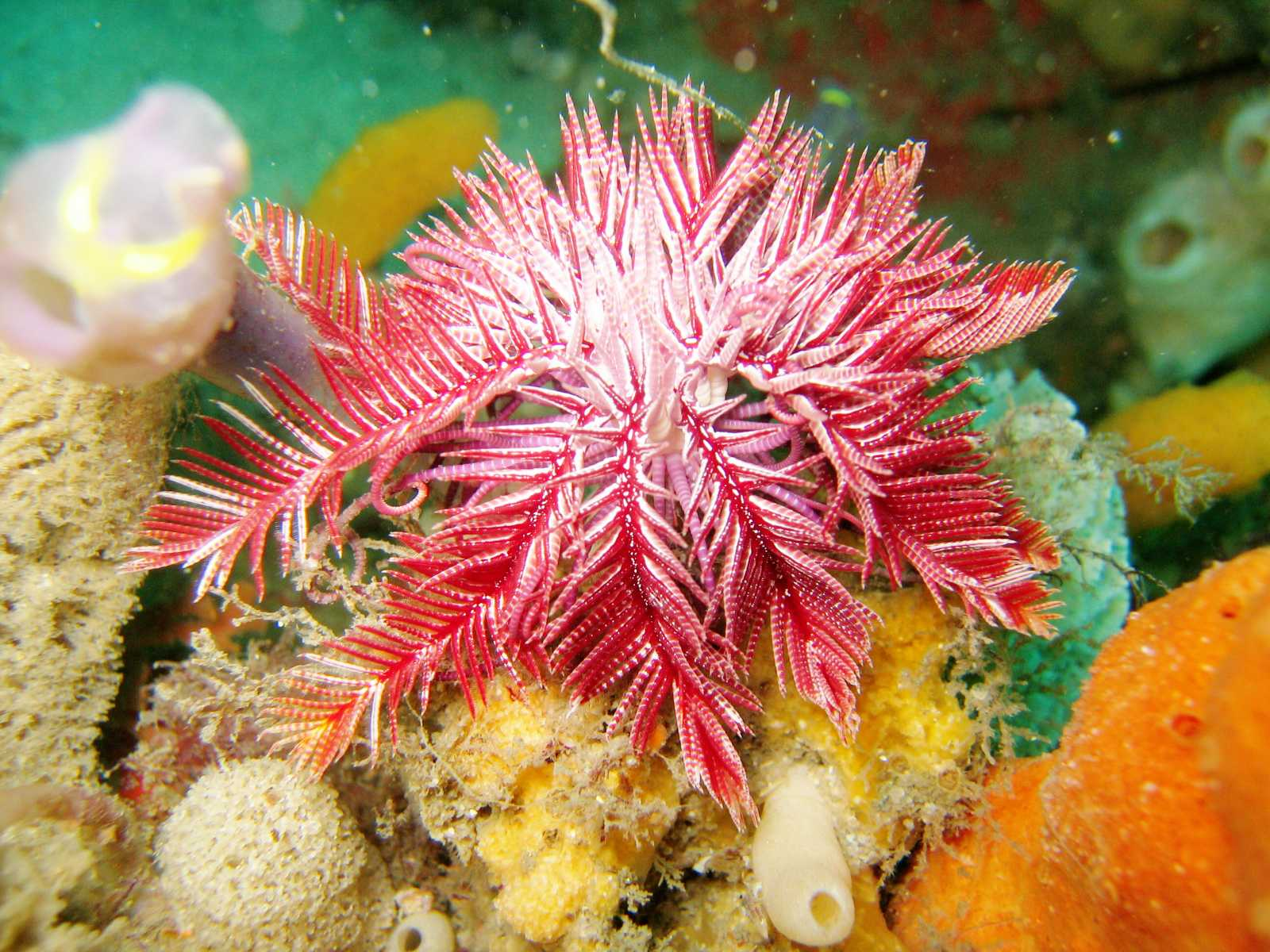
Passion flower feather star

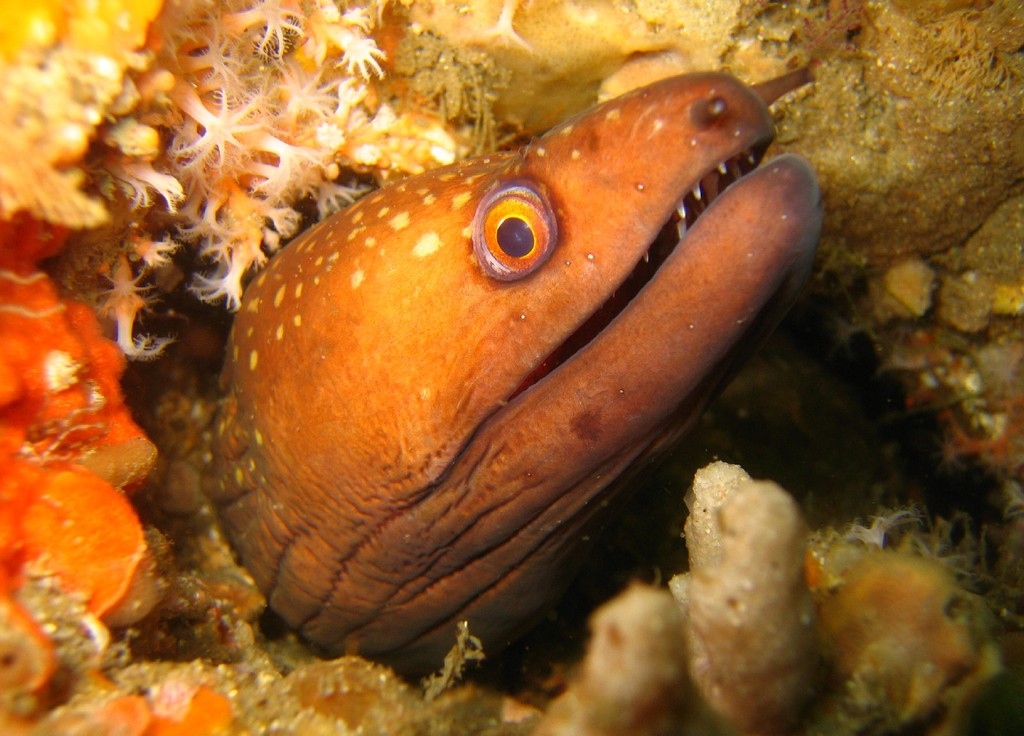
Saw-tooth moray eel

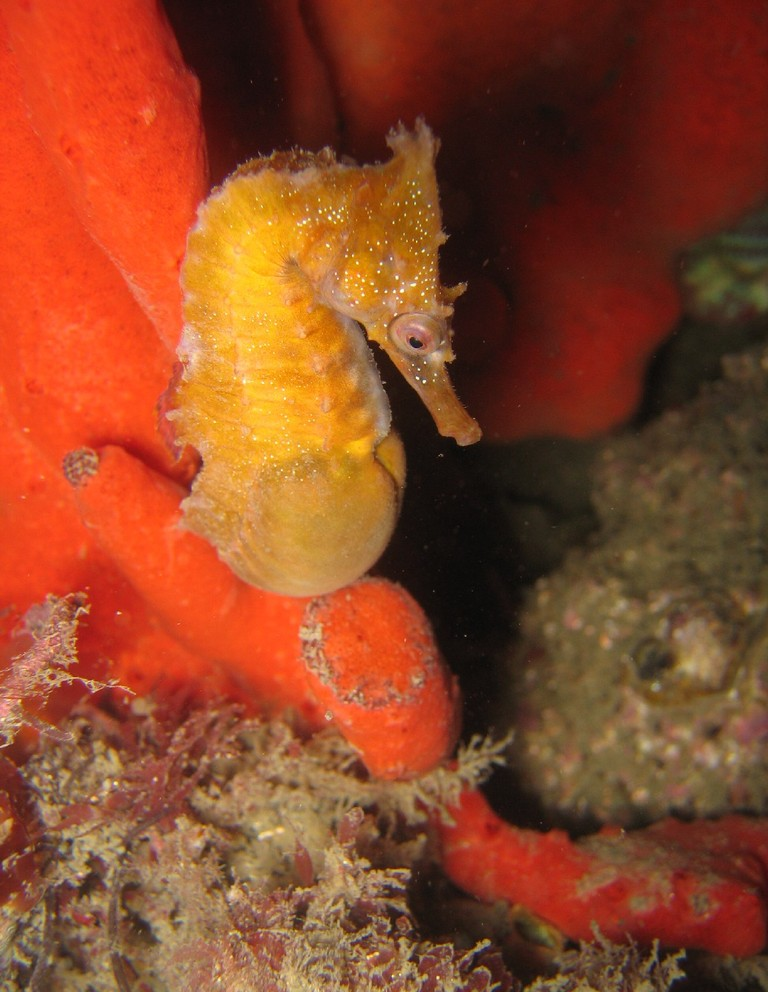
White's seahorse

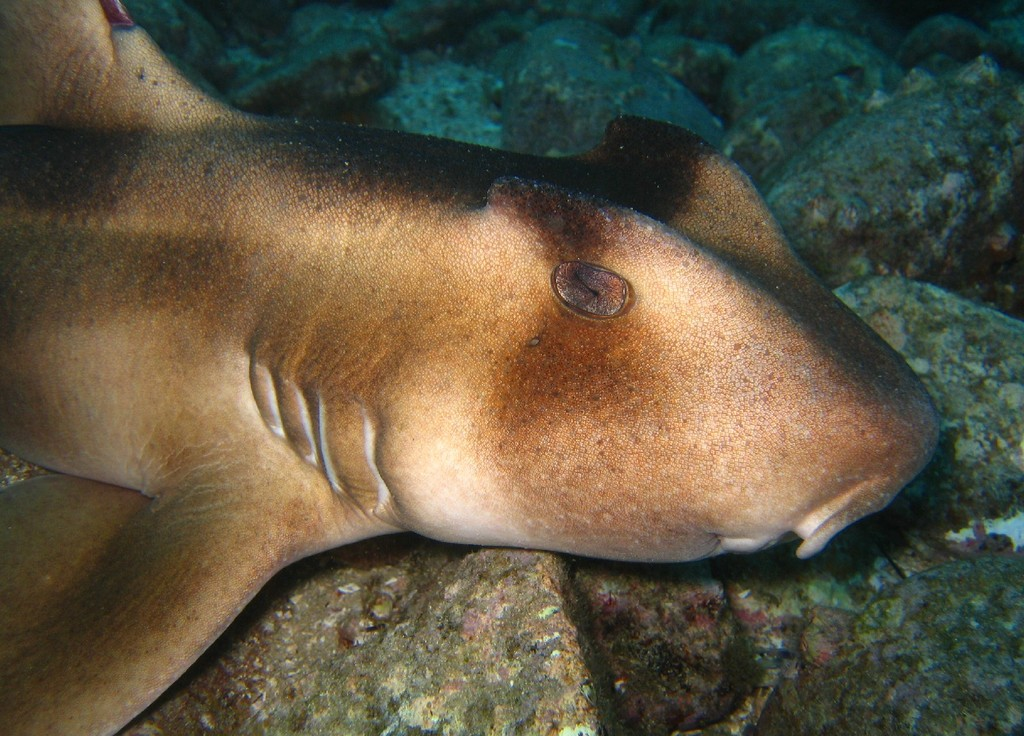
Crested horn shark

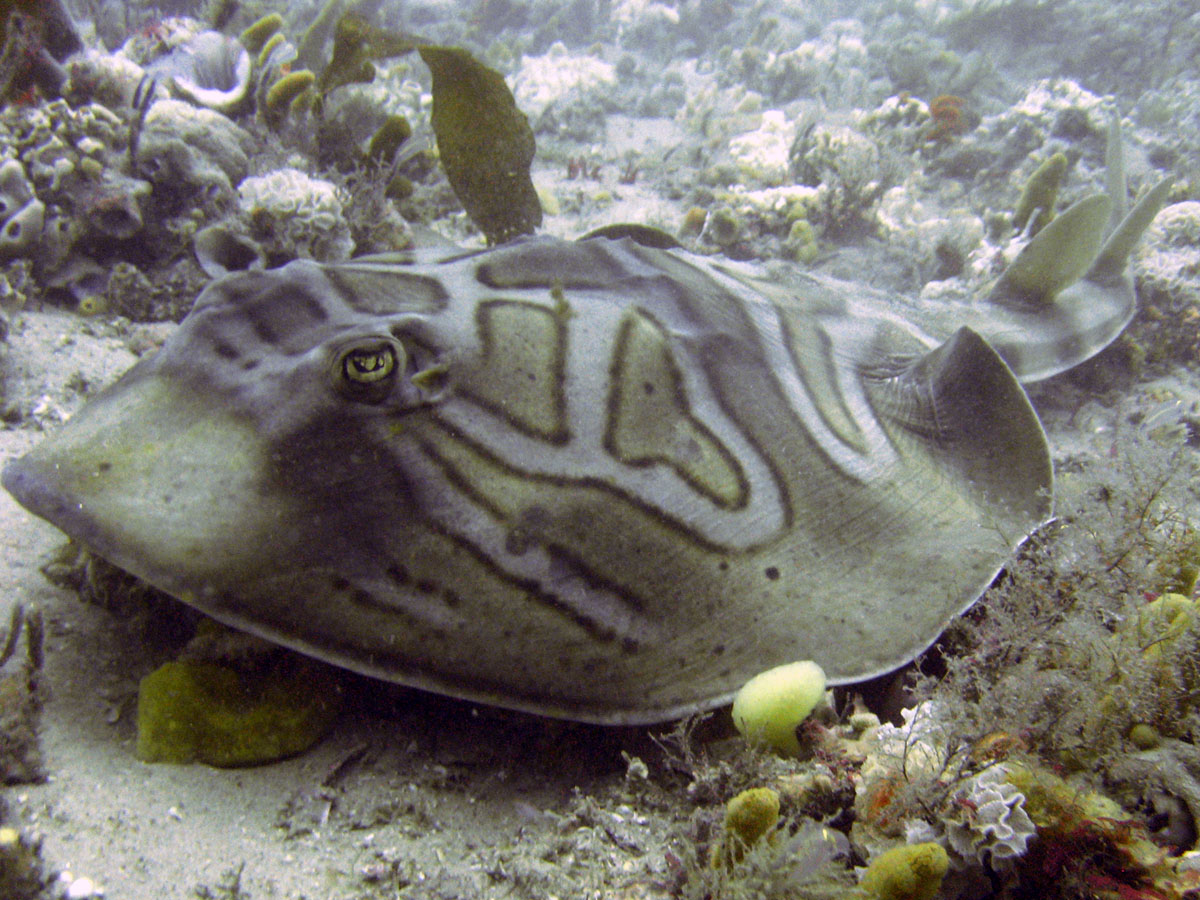
Eastern fiddler ray

== Demographics ==
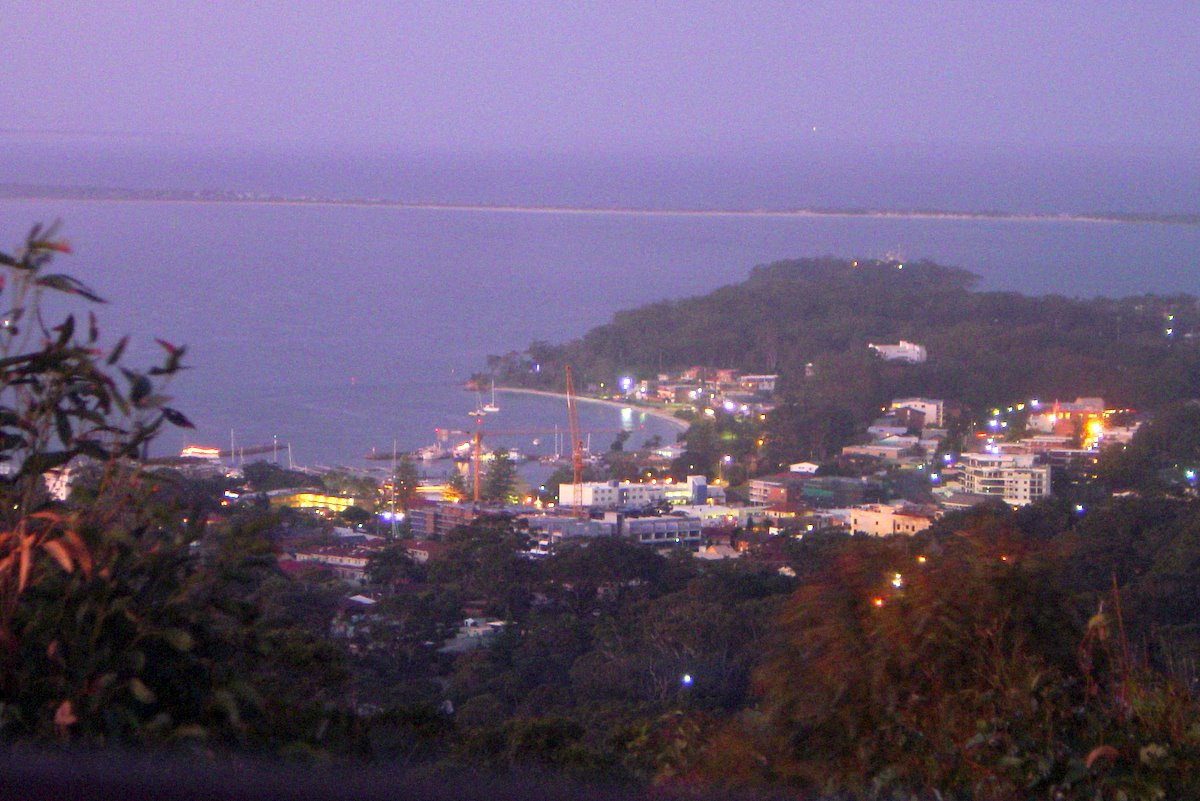
Nelson Bay at dusk from Gan Gan Lookout

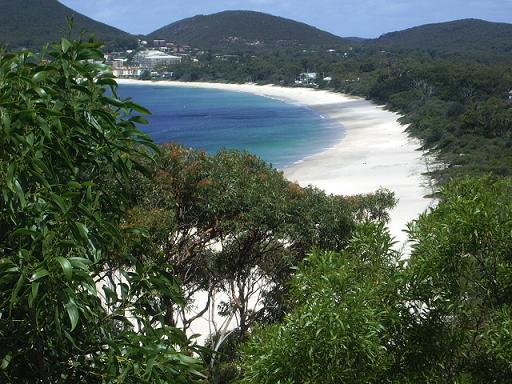
Shoal Bay beach in Port Stephens

At the time of the 2006 census, more than 85% of the population around Port Stephens resided in towns and suburbs that have developed on or near the southern shores of the port. More than 22,188 people live within 3 km (1.9 mi) of the port in the suburbs of Corlette, Lemon Tree Passage, Mallabula, Nelson Bay, Oyster Cove, Salamander Bay, Shoal Bay, Soldiers Point, Tanilba Bay and Taylors Beach. Another 5,343 people live in other suburbs on the Tomaree peninsula that are within 10 km (6 mi) of Port Stephens. These suburbs include Anna Bay,^{Note1} Boat Harbour, Bobs Farm, Fingal Bay, Fishermans Bay and One Mile.

Most urban development to the south of Port Stephens has occurred on the Tomaree peninsula in the suburbs of Corlette, Nelson Bay, Salamander Bay, Shoal Bay and Soldiers Point.

On the western shore is the suburb of Swan Bay, a small community of around 100 persons. The main industry in the area is oyster farming, however a small tourist resort is near the mouth of Twelve Mile Creek. Karuah township, which has a population of 857, is at the north-western corner of the port, at the mouth of the Karuah River.

East of the Karuah River, in the Mid-Coast Council local government area there are 3,584 people living in Bundabah, Carrington, Hawks Nest, North Arm Cove, Pindimar, Tahlee and Tea Gardens.

== Tourism and recreation ==
Port Stephens is a popular tourism destination with a strong focus on aquatic activities such as whale and dolphin watching, fishing and recreational boating and swimming.

== Notes ==
1. Although 900 metres (2,953 ft) of Anna Bay's shoreline actually touches Port Stephens near Taylor's Beach, none of its residents live in this area. The vast majority of Anna Bay residents live close to the Tasman Sea shoreline, well away from Port Stephens, although there is a small community living near the border between Anna Bay and Taylor's Beach.
