= Salamander Bay =

Salamander Bay New South Wales
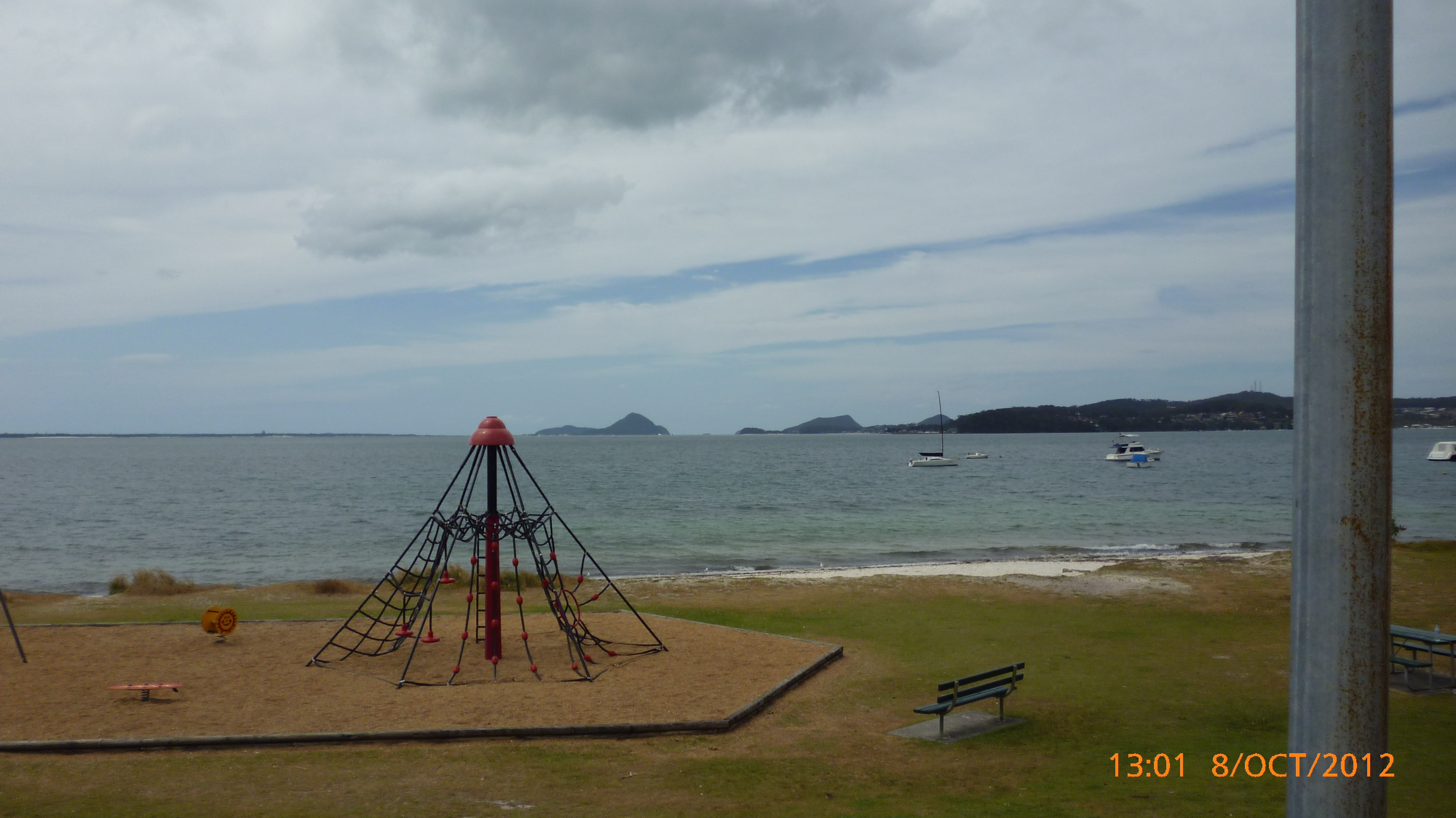
- View from Salamander Bay east towards the mouth of Port Stephens approximately 12 km (7.5 mi) away.

- Coordinates: 32°43′45″S 152°05′22″E
- Population: 4,991 (2021 census)
  - Density: 587.18/km^{2} (1,520.8/sq mi) (Note: The density presented is that of the whole suburb. However, only about 3.5 square kilometres (1.35 sq mi), or about 41%, of the suburb is residential in nature. The remainder of the suburb consists mainly of unpopulated scrubland, coastal reserves and beaches. The population density of the residential portion of the suburb is much higher at 1,384/km^{2} (3,580/sq mi).)
- Postcode(s): 2317
- Elevation: 4.5 m (15 ft)
- Area: 8.5 km^{2} (3.3 sq mi) (Note: Area calculation is based on 1:100000 map 9232 NEWCASTLE.)
- Time zone: AEST (UTC+10)
  - Summer (DST): AEDT (UTC+11)
- Location: 202 km (126 mi) NNE of Sydney; 55 km (34 mi) NE of Newcastle; 40 km (25 mi) ENE of Raymond Terrace
- LGA(s): Port Stephens Council
- Region: Hunter
- County: Gloucester
- Parish: Tomaree
- State electorate(s): Port Stephens
- Federal division(s): Paterson
Mean max temp	Mean min temp	Annual rainfall
27.3 °C; 81 °F	8.4 °C; 47 °F	1,348.9 mm 53.1 in
Suburbs around Salamander Bay:
Soldiers Point	Port Stephens	Corlette
Port Stephens	Salamander Bay	Nelson Bay
Taylors Beach	Anna Bay	Nelson Bay

Salamander Bay is a suburb of the Port Stephens local government area in the Hunter Region of New South Wales, Australia. The Worimi people are the traditional owners of the Port Stephens area. Named after the adjacent shallow bay, itself named after Salamander, a convict ship from the Third Fleet, which was the first European vessel to enter Port Stephens (1791), it is a mainly residential suburb with a large shopping centre. At the 2021 census, Salamander Bay had a population of 4,991. It is home to Tomaree High School, a TAFE facility and St Phillips Christian College (Port Stephens Campus).
