= Tomaree High School =

Location
- Salamander Bay, New South Wales; Australia; 32°44′13″S 152°6′42″E

Information
- Type: Government-funded co-educational comprehensive secondary day school
- Motto: Forward Together
- Established: 1998; 28 years ago
- School district: Port Stephens; Regional North
- Educational authority: New South Wales Department of Education
- Principal: Paul Baxter
- Teaching staff: 86.9 FTE (2018)
- Enrolment: 1,113 (2018)
- Campus: Suburban
- Colours: Electric blue and yellow
- Website: tomaree-h.schools.nsw.gov.au

Tomaree High School is a government-funded co-educational comprehensive secondary day school, located in Salamander Bay, a suburb of the Port Stephens Council local government area in New South Wales, Australia.

Established in 1998, the school enrolled approximately 1,110 students in 2018, from Year 7 to Year 12, of whom eight percent identified as Indigenous Australians and eight percent were from a language background other than English. The school is operated by the NSW Department of Education; the principal is Paul Baxter.

== Overview ==
A crossbow shooting incident occurred at the school in April 2003. Two 16-year-old girls were injured during the incident. A 16-year-old male was charged with attempted murder, two counts of maliciously wounding with intent to cause grievous bodily harm, possession of a prohibited weapon, and throwing an explosive. However, his homemade explosive did not work.

== See also ==
- List of government schools in New South Wales: Q–Z
- Education in Australia
