= HMS Shark (1776) =

Convict ship

History

Great Britain
- Name: HMS Shark
- Builder: Randall, Rotherhithe
- Launched: March 1776
- Acquired: 1775 by purchase on the stocks
- Renamed: HMS Salamander
- Fate: Sold August 1783

Great Britain
- Name: Salamander
- Owner: Peter & Robert Mellish (Mellish & Co.); 1803-4:Carver & Co., or Calvert & Co.
- Acquired: By purchase c.1783
- Fate: No longer listed in 1812

General characteristics
- Tons burthen: 303, or 309, or 313, or 319, or 320, or 342 (Note: Calculation using the dimensions for her length overall and beam yields a burthen of 319 tons.) (bm)
- Length: 96 ft 3 in (29.3 m) (overall); 78 ft 4 in (23.9 m) (keel)
- Beam: 27 ft 5 in (8.4 m)
- Draught: 9 ft 0 in (2.7 m)
- Sail plan: HMS:Sloop; Mercantile:Fully-rigged ship
- Complement: 1799:30; 1804:34
- Armament: 1776: 16 guns; 1799:14 × 6-pounder and 9-pounder guns; 1804: 10 × 9-pounder guns; 1806: 12 × 6-pounder guns

The British Royal Navy purchased HMS Shark on the stocks in 1775. She was launched in 1776, and in 1778 converted to a fireship and renamed HMS Salamander. The Navy sold her in 1783. She then became the mercantile Salamander. In the 1780s she was in the northern whale fishery. In 1791 she transported convicts to Australia. She then became a whaling ship in the southern whale fishery for a number of years, before becoming a general transport and then a slave ship. In 1804 the French captured her, but the Royal Navy recaptured her. Although she is last listed in 1811, she does not appear in Lloyd's List (LL) ship arrival and departure (SAD) data after 1804.

== Royal Navy ==
The Navy purchased Shark on the stocks in November 1775 and launched her on 9 March 1776. She was commissioned under Commander John Chapman. She sailed to the Leeward Island on 26 May 1776. On 27 July 1776 Shark had a sharp but inconclusive encounter with the USS Reprisal. Vice-admiral James Young sent her back to England in April 1777, together with Comet, as escorts to a convoy that also included Yarmouth, which Young was sending back for repairs following her engagement with the American privateer Randolph. She returned to the Leeward Islands, leaving Britain on 27 July 1777. The Navy converted Shark to a fireship and renamed her Salamander on 23 July 1778.

Commander James Kinneer commissioned Salamander in November 1778 for Admiral Hardy's fleet. In September 1779 Commander the Hon. Seymour Finch replaced Kinneer. On 28 May 1780 Finch Salamander sailed for the Leeward Islands. In February 1781 Commander R. H. Hichens replaced Finch. In a case that went all the way to the Lords of Appeal, Salamander was among the vessels entitled to share in the prize money for the capture of the island of Saint Eustatius in February 1781.

Commander the Honourable Henry Edwyn Stanhope replaced Hichens in around April. Stanhope was promoted post-captain on 16 June and replaced by Commander Edward Bowater on 5 September. Although she was assigned to Sir George Brydges Rodney's division, she did not participate in the action at the Battle of the Chesapeake. In March 1782 Commander Richard Lucas replaced Bowater on the Leeward Islands stations, but one month later Commander Henry Deacon replaced Lucas on the Jamaica station. Salamander shared with Triton in the proceeds of the French sloop Prince of Orange, captured in March 1782 at Saint Lucia.

The Navy then sold Salamander on 14 August 1783.

== Mercantile service ==
Northern whale fisheries (1784–1790): Salamander appeared in the 1786 Lloyd's Register (LR) with T. Ash, master, and P. Mellish, owner. Her trade was London-Greenland. That is, she was engaged in the Greenland whale fishery. Already in 1784 she was reported to have taken "3 fish" (whales). In August 1786 Salamander, Ash, master, was off Whitby with eight fish, returning from Greenland. In July 1787, Salamander, Ash (or Ashton), master, was reported to have taken two fish, at Davis Strait. In June 1788, "Salamander, of London", was reported to have no fish. Still, Salamander, Paterson, master, returned to London with three fish.

Convict transport (1791): Under the command of John Nichol, master, Salamander was part of the Third Fleet, which transported convicts to Australia. She departed Portsmouth on 27 March 1791 and arrived on 21 August 1791 in Port Jackson, New South Wales. She embarked 160 male convicts, five of whom died during the voyage.

She left Port Jackson on 4 September 1791 for Norfolk Island and on the voyage was the first known vessel to enter Port Stephens. Salamander Point (now Nelson Head and Fly Point), Salamander Bay (now Nelson Bay), the present Salamander Bay and associated suburb were named after her.

Southern whale fisheries (1791–1793): Salamander then became a whaler in the South Pacific. Not having much luck she sailed on to Peru. She was reported off the coast there in November 1792 with 30 tons of sperm oil. On 30 March 1793 she was "all well" at 33°0′N 37°0′W with 132 barrels of sperm oil and 6000 seal skins. She returned to England on 15 September 1793 with 117 tuns of sperm oil and 6100 seal skins, having come via St Salvadore.

Southern whale fisheries (1794–1796): Under the command of Captain William Irish, on 9 February 1794 Salamander sailed again for the New South Wales fishery. By May she was at Rio de Janeiro, where she underwent repairs and calefaction. She was in Rio again in May two years later, replenishing her supplies. She returned to Britain on 2 September 1796 with 141 tuns of sperm oil, seven tuns of whale oil, five cwt of bone, and 250 seal skins.

Transport (1797–1799): SAD data shows that the "Salamander transport" sailed from Yarmouth on 17 June 1797, bound for the West Indies. She was later reported at Barbados and Jamaica. The "Salamander (Transport)" returned from Jamaica, arriving at Gravesend on 27 July 1799.

Southern whale fisheries (1800–1801): Salamander underwent a "good repair" in 1799. Captain Thomas Hopper then received a letter of marque on 13 December for Salamander. The Protection Lists, which exempted the crews of certain classes of vessels, such as whalers, from impressment, listed her from 1798 to 1800. She sailed in 1800 for the Brazil Banks. (Note: The Brazil Banks are the edge of the continental shelf to the east and south of latitude 16°S of the coast of South America.) She stopped in at Rio de Janeiro in May 1800 seeking repairs after having been attacked. She was reported off the Cape of Good Hope on 4 April 1801 on her way to the Cape of Good Hope for the condemnation of a small Spanish prize Salamander had taken off the Brazilian coast. At the time Salamander had 150 tons of whale oil. On 2 October 1801 Salamander was at St Helena. She then returned to England on 8 November.

Lloyd's Register for 1802 listed Salamander as a London-based transport, with Hutchins, master, and still under the ownership of Mellish & Co. There was no mention of armament. She underwent another "good repair" that year.

1st enslaving voyage (1802–1803): A database of enslaving voyages shows that Salamander became an enslaving ship with William Jameson, master and Anthony Calvert, owner. Captain William Jameson sailed from London on 11 October 1802, bound for West Africa. Because she sailed during the short-lived Peace of Amiens Jameson did not acquire a letter of marque. Salamander stated acquiring captive at Cape Coast Castle on 12 December 1802. She delivered 313 captives to Havana on 1 May 1803. She arrived back at London on 26 August 1803.

2nd enslaving voyage (1804): Lloyd's Register for 1804 showed Salamander's ownership had changed to Carver & Co., her master to Walbert, and her trade to London-Africa. Captain Derick Woolbert acquired a letter of marque on 17 February 1804. He sailed from London on 4 March 1804.

Despite her armament and letter of marque, Salamander was captured in 1804, recaptured, and taken into Barbados.

The French privateer Grand Décidé, of 20 guns and 153 men, captured Princess Royal, a brig privateer of 10 guns, which was carrying government stores. Grande Decide manned Princess Royal, and on 22 September she captured Salamander after a "smart action". Grand Décidé put 95 captives from Salamander on Princess Royal, and took 134 captives. Grand Décidé then sent Salamander and two other Guineamen to Basse-Terre, Guadaloupe.

When HMS Heureux recaptured the "English Ship Salamander - (a Guineaman)", Salamander had only five captives aboard. Princess Royal too was recaptured, by HMS Curieux, and arrived at Barbados on 13 October.

Subsequent career: After 1804 Salamander disappeared from newspaper mentions in "Ship News" sections, particularly of ship arrivals and departures. From 1805 on, Lloyd's Register had an unchanged entry showing Wolbert, master, Calvert & Co., owner, and trade London-Africa. The database of slave voyages, however, has no further record of such voyages, and Britain abolished the slave trade in 1807. The entry continues unchanged through 1811. Salamander was no longer listed in 1812. With minor differences, the same holds true for the entry in the Register of Shipping.
