= David James Campbell =

Australian advertising executive and filmmaker (born 1983)

- Born: 6 June 1983 (age 41); Australia

David James Campbell (born 6 June 1983) is an advertising executive, writer and film director from Adelaide, South Australia, known for his 2013 film Lemon Tree Passage.

== Career ==
After dropping out from Blackwood High School in 2000, he became a freelance graphic designer before being employed by design firm, Egplant. In 2004 along with, Jeremy Ervine, he launched Fnuky, an advertising agency which promised "big ideas, not just ads".

He served as the agency's creative director, leading it to become South Australia's most internationally awarded creative agency with its work being recognised in major advertising award shows in London, Berlin, Los Angeles, Sydney and Cannes. In May 2012 he was awarded a Gold Clio, one of the advertising industries highest honors.

David has also shown an interest in filmmaking, personally directing many of the agency's ads. In 2012 he directed his first short film, Afternoons With Max Marshall. Only months later he directed a short comedy, Blind, starring Francis Greenslade.

Campbell served a short stint as a director of publicly listed not-for-profit organisation, Fanconi Anaemia Australia Limited before resigning to run as a candidate in the Adelaide City Council election in 2007.

== Controversy ==
David has been known for his outspoken and controversial impact on the Adelaide advertising industry. In 2009 he was called a "tragic try hard tosser" by the managing director of Clemenger BBDO Adelaide, the city's biggest advertising agency. The comment sparked a heated debate between the pair in the local media.

== Family ==
In November 2006 Campbell married his wife, Rebecca, in Fiji. He has two children.
