= Mallabula, New South Wales =

Mallabula New South Wales
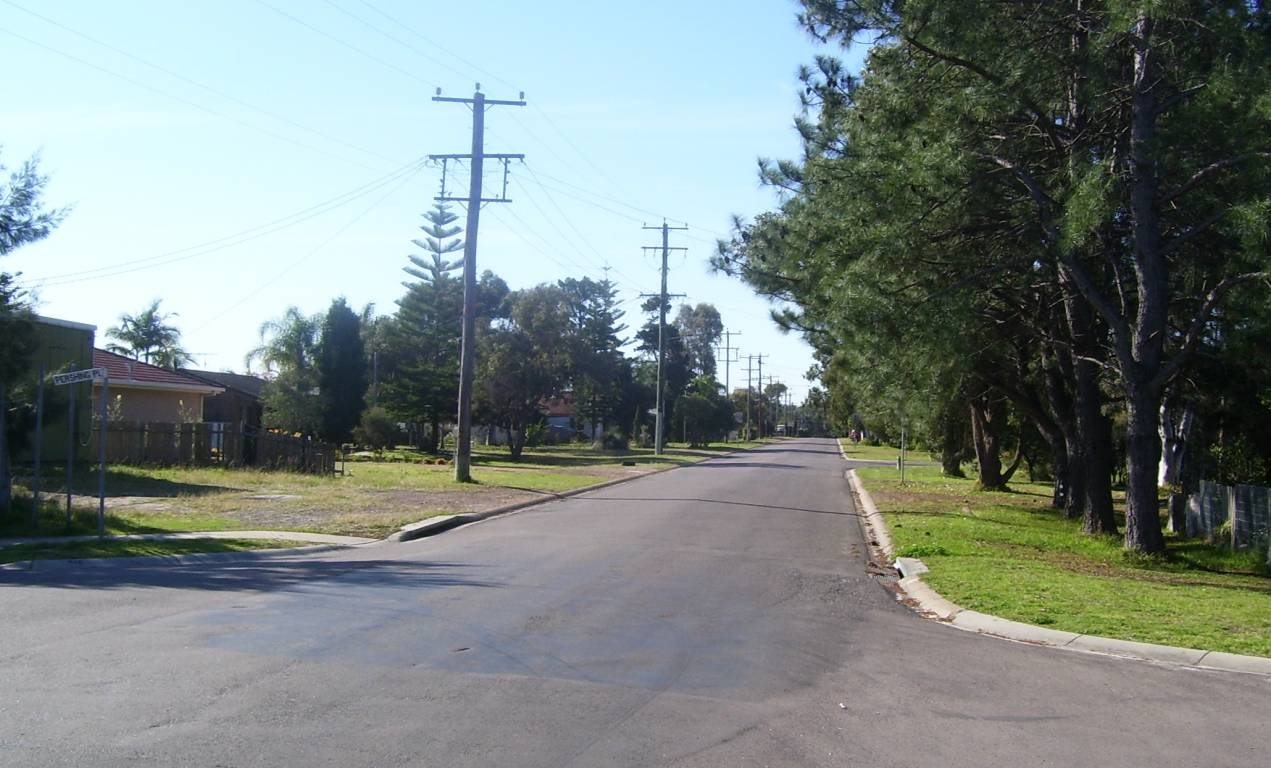
- Main road of Mallabula

- Coordinates: 32°44.1′S 152°0.6′E
- Population: 963 (2021 census)
  - Density: 356.67/km^{2} (923.8/sq mi) (Note: This is the average density of the whole suburb. However, approximately 2.1 km^{2} (0.8 sq mi) (77.8%) of the suburb is uninhabited or consists of non-residential zones at the edge of the suburb and the average population density in the inhabited portion of the suburb is much higher.)
- Postcode(s): 2319
- Elevation: 3 m (10 ft) (Note: Elevation data as shown on 1:100000 map 9232 NEWCASTLE and 1:25000 map 93324S PORT STEPHENS.)
- Area: 2.7 km^{2} (1.0 sq mi) (Note: Area calculation is based on 1:100000 map 9232 NEWCASTLE. The area presented is that of the whole suburb. The residential portion of the suburb is only 0.5 km^{2} (0.2 sq mi) or 22.2% of the total area.)
- Time zone: AEST (UTC+10)
  - Summer (DST): AEDT (UTC+11)
- Location: 192 km (119 mi) NNE of Sydney; 45 km (28 mi) NNE of Newcastle; 30 km (19 mi) ENE of Raymond Terrace
- LGA(s): Port Stephens Council
- Region: Hunter
- County: Gloucester
- Parish: Sutton
- State electorate(s): Port Stephens
- Federal division(s): Paterson
Mean max temp	Mean min temp	Annual rainfall
27.3 °C; 81 °F	8.4 °C; 47 °F	1,348.9 mm 53.1 in
Suburbs around Mallabula:
Port Stephens	Port Stephens	Port Stephens
Tanilba Bay	Mallabula	Lemon Tree Passage
Tanilba Bay	Tilligerry Creek	Tilligerry Creek

Mallabula is a primarily residential suburb of the Port Stephens local government area in the Hunter Region of New South Wales, Australia. It is located on the Tilligerry Peninsula between Lemon Tree Passage and Tanilba Bay. The origin of the name may mean "three swamps" in the local Aboriginal language.

== Geography ==
Mallabula is a low-lying suburb, almost at sea level.^{Note3} It is bisected by Lemon Tree Passage Road, which stretches for the full length of the peninsula, from Salt Ash in the south-west, to Lemon Tree Passage. In the northern part of the suburb is a small subdivision covering 0.5 square kilometres (0.2 sq mi) on the banks of Tanilba Bay.

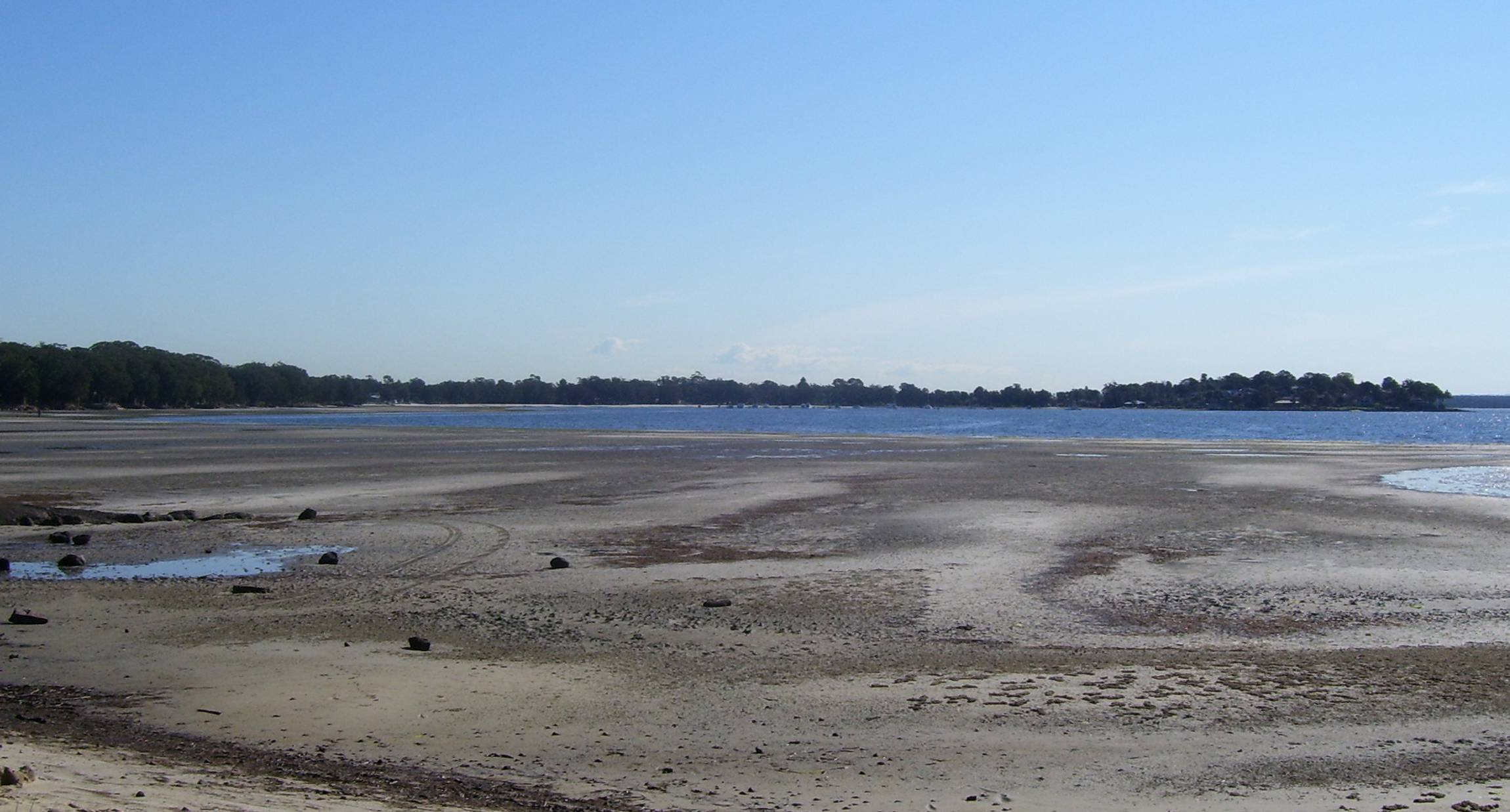
Tanilba Bay from Mallabula showing the beaches typical of both suburbs

The beach consists mainly of sand flats that are exposed at low tide and almost completely covered at high tide preventing the beach from being useful as either a swimming or surfing beach. Near Rookes Point, at the mouth of Tanilba Bay, the land rises to a height of 9.1 metres (30 ft) AMSL. At the eastern extremity of this area the land reaches a peak of 18.3 m (60 ft) in a heavily forested area. However, between these two points and throughout the remainder of the suburb the land is generally no more than 3 m (10 ft) AMSL and is predominantly sandy.

The land south of Lemon Tree Passage Road is generally uninhabited, occupied only by a handful of homes in a single cul-de-sac and a sewage treatment plant.

== Demographics ==
At the 2011 census Mallabula had a population of 851. Almost all of the population resides in a small, residential subdivision occupying only 18.5% of the entire suburb. The population density in this area is 1,702/km^{2} (4,410/sq mi). The remaining population resides in four homes in a single cul-de-sac south of Tanilba Bay and is accounted for in the ABS population data for that suburb.

== Facilities ==
There is a sports ground called Mallabula Sports Complex which has five fields, athletics field, tennis courts, netball courts, canteens, toilets, meeting room and car parking. On 1195 Lemon Tree Passage Road is Mallabula Community Centre which provides tables, chairs and a kitchen. Tilligerry Aquatic Centre is a 8 lane heated 25-metre swimming pool which offers swimming lessons and aqua aerobics.
