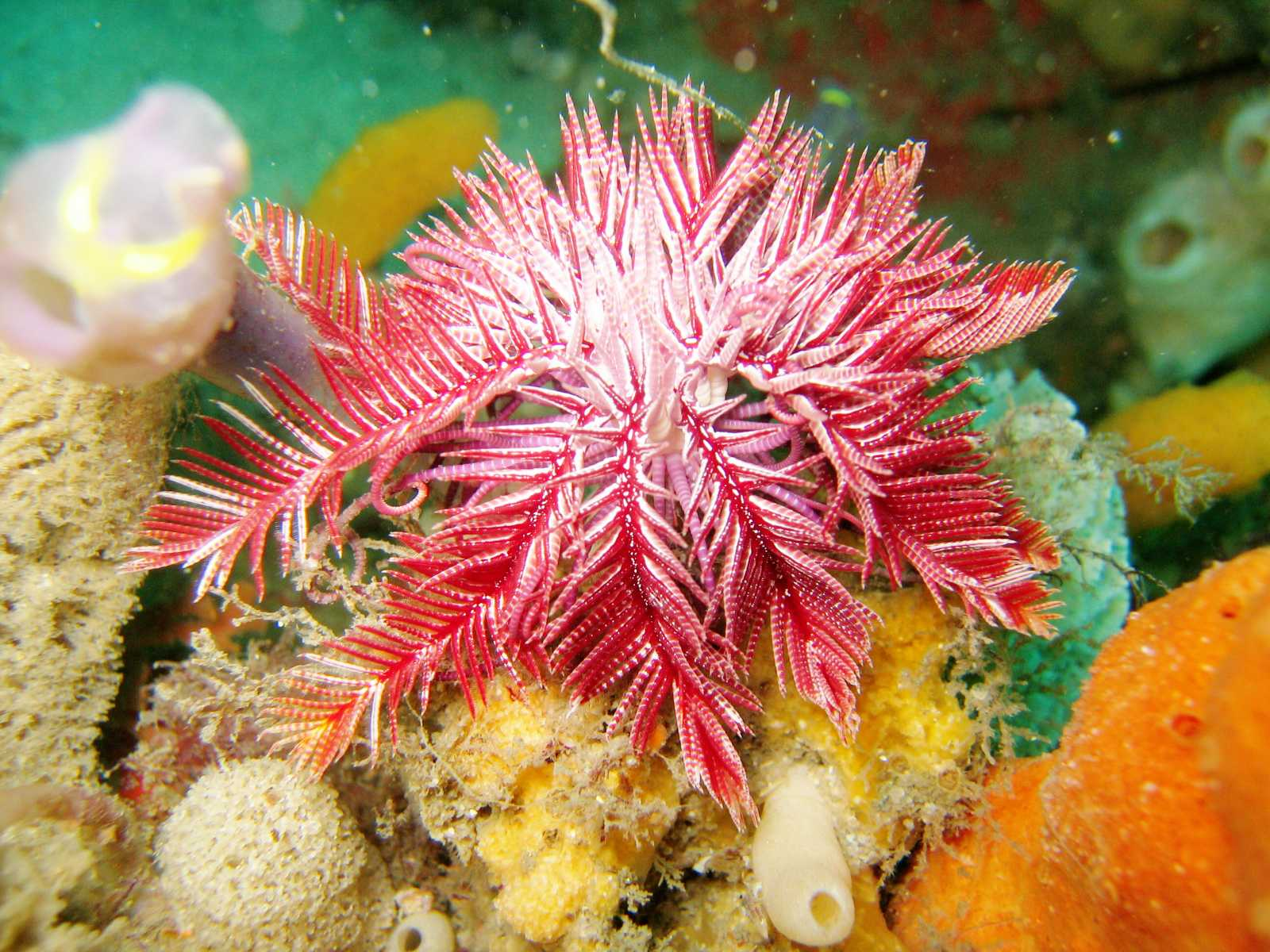
- Ptilometra australis

Scientific classification
- Domain: Eukaryota
- Kingdom: Animalia
- Phylum: Echinodermata
- Class: Crinoidea
- Order: Comatulida
- Superfamily: Tropiometroidea
- Family: Ptilometridae; Clark, 1907
- Genus: Ptilometra; Clark, 1907

= Ptilometra =

Genus of crinoids from the phylum Echinodermata

Ptilometra is a genus of echinoderms belonging to the monotypic family Ptilometridae.

The species of this genus are found in Australia.

Species:

- Ptilometra australis (Wilton, 1843)
- Ptilometra macronema (Müller, 1846)
