= Corlette, New South Wales =

Corlette New South Wales
- Coordinates: 32°43′29″S 152°06′53″E
- Population: 5,699 (2021 census)
  - Density: 1,838.39/km^{2} (4,761.4/sq mi)
- Postcode(s): 2315
- Area: 3.1 km^{2} (1.2 sq mi) (Note: Area calculation is based on 1:100000 map 9332 PORT STEPHENS.)
- Time zone: AEST (UTC+10)
  - Summer (DST): AEDT (UTC+11)
- Location: 205 km (127 mi) NNE of Sydney; 58 km (36 mi) NE of Newcastle; 44 km (27 mi) ENE of Raymond Terrace
- LGA(s): Port Stephens Council
- Region: Hunter
- County: Gloucester
- Parish: Tomaree
- State electorate(s): Port Stephens
- Federal division(s): Paterson
Mean max temp	Mean min temp	Annual rainfall
27.3 °C; 81 °F	8.4 °C; 47 °F	1,348.9 mm 53.1 in
Suburbs around Corlette:
Port Stephens	Port Stephens	Port Stephens
Port Stephens	Corlette	Nelson Bay
Salamander Bay	Salamander Bay, Nelson Bay	Nelson Bay

Corlette is a suburb of the Port Stephens local government area in the Hunter Region of New South Wales, Australia. It is located just west of Nelson Bay on the shores of Port Stephens. It was named after Captain James Corlette who skippered the 63 tonnes (62 long tons) cutter Lambton which was the first privately owned local vessel. Corlette first used it to ship timber and wool out of Port Stephens in 1816. While property values throughout the suburb average around A$1,100,000 in the most affluent areas on the shores of Salamander Bay individual sale prices of $3.7 million have been realised. It has many local tourism attractions including Bagnalls Beach Reserve, Port Stephens Shell Museum, Blue Water Sailing and Nude Kayaks.

== Geography ==
Corlette is located on the southern shores of Port Stephens with approximately 75% of the suburb's 4.3 km (2.7 mi) of coastline being occupied by three beaches. Its western border forms the shoreline of Salamander Bay, after which the adjoining suburb of Salamander Bay is named. On its northern shoreline are two beaches. The largest of these, Bagnalls Beach, gives its name to a large housing estate within the suburb.
