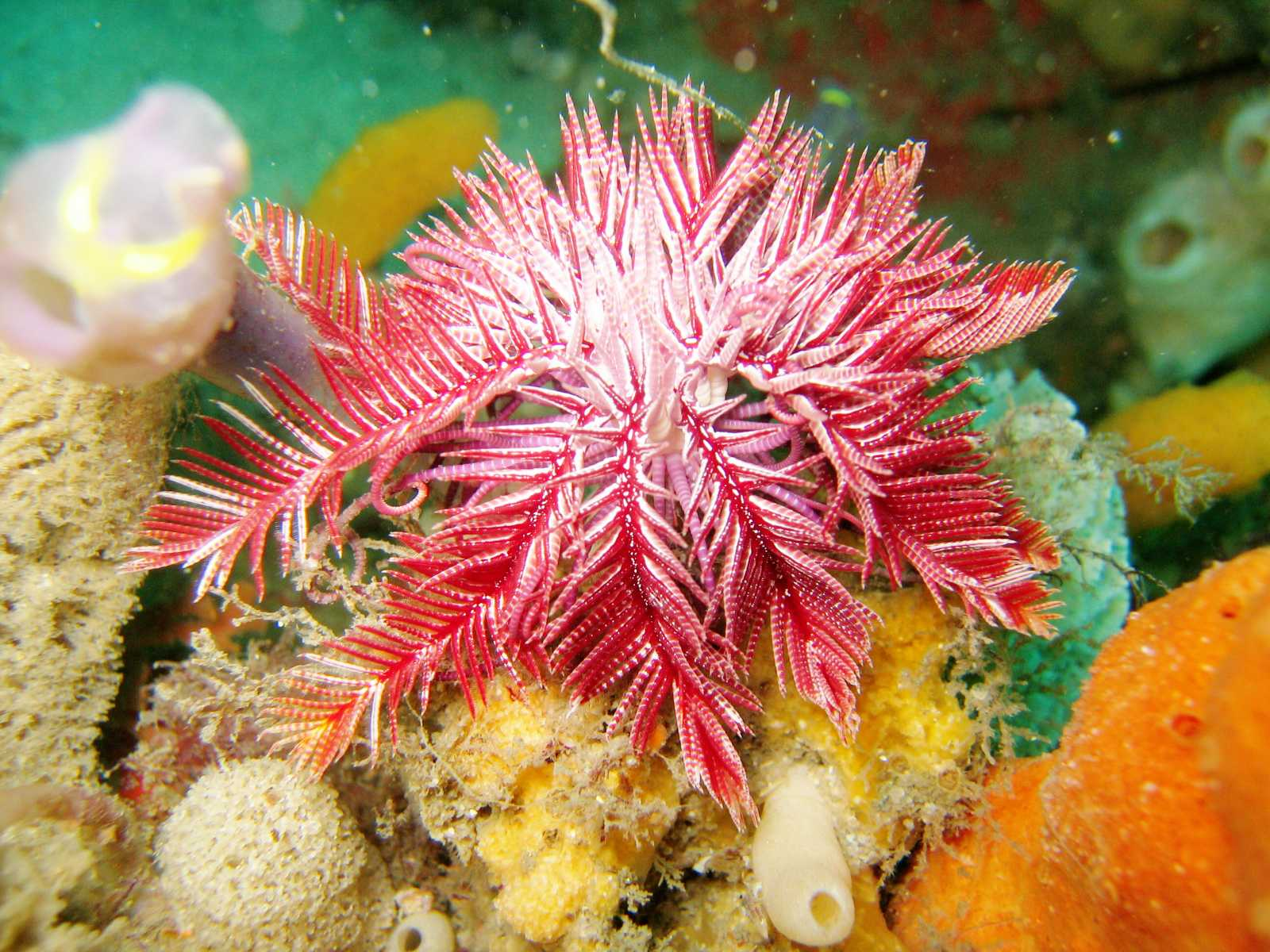

Scientific classification
- Kingdom: Animalia
- Phylum: Echinodermata
- Class: Crinoidea
- Order: Comatulida
- Family: Ptilometridae
- Genus: Ptilometra
- Species: P. australis

Binomial name
- Ptilometra australis (Wilton, 1843)

Synonyms
- Encrinus australis Wilton, 1843; Ptilometra muelleri (AH Clark, 1909); Ptilometra mülleri AH Clark, 1909

= Ptilometra australis =

Species of crinoid

Ptilometra australis, the passion flower feather star, is a species of crinoid. It is native to the coasts of southeastern Australia where it is found on reefs, in estuaries, and bays at depths down to about 110 metres (360 ft).

== Description ==
The passion flower feather star is a robust crinoid with a diameter of about 12 cm (5 in) when fully extended. It has eighteen to twenty jointed arms which can be coiled up when the animal is not feeding. These are attached to a cup-shaped body or calyx. The arms are edged by feathery appendages known as pinnules. Each pinnule has rows of tube feet on either side of a central ambulacral groove lined with cilia. This groove is continuous with the central groove on the arm which leads to the mouth at the centre of the calyx. The aboral (lower) surface of the crinoid has several hooked appendages called cirri which grip onto the substrate, which may be a rock, a sponge, a coral or sea fan. The colour of this crinoid is usually some shade of red, though subjection to organic solvents yields a complex mixture of pigments whose components can be separated using chromatography.

== Distribution and habitat ==
The passion flower feather star is native to the coasts of southeastern Australia down to depths of about 110 metres (360 ft). Its range extends from Masthead Island in Queensland and the mouth of the Clarence River in New South Wales to Port Philip Bay in Victoria. It is found on rocks and rubble in sheltered bays, in estuaries and on reefs.

== Biology ==
The passion flower feather star is a filter feeder. It catches plankton and suspended particles of detritus with the tube feet on the pinnules. These feet are covered with sticky mucus that traps the food particles and then roll it into balls before moving them into the ambulacral groove, where cilia propel the stream of mucus towards the mouth.
