= Lemon Tree Passage (film) =

- Film poster
- Directed by: David James Campbell
- Written by: Erica Brien; David James Campbell
- Produced by: Jeremy Ervine
- Starring: Jessica Tovey; Pippa Black; Andrew Ryan; Tim Phillipps
- Cinematography: Sam King
- Edited by: David James Campbell
- Music by: Joachim Horsley
- Production company: Thirteen Disciples
- Distributed by: Odins Eye Entertainment (Australia)
- Release date: October 31, 2014
- Running time: 84 minutes
- Country: Australia
- Language: English

Lemon Tree Passage is a 2014 Australian supernatural horror/thriller film that was directed by David James Campbell and is his feature film directorial debut. The film received an Australian release and stars Andrew Ryan, Tim Phillipps, Pippa Black, Jessica Tovey, and Tim Pocock as a group of backpackers that find themselves in the midst of strange occurrences. The movie's premise is based upon an urban legend that claims that if a motorist speeds along Lemon Tree Passage Road in Lemon Tree Passage, New South Wales, they will see a ghost.

== Plot ==
Oscar (Andrew Ryan) and Geordie (Tim Phillipps) are two Australian friends who decide to take a group of American backpackers, Amelia (Pippa Black), Maya (Jessica Tovey), and her brother Toby (Tim Pocock), home with them. Oscar is keen on scoring with the beautiful Amelia while the shy Geordie finds himself becoming attracted to Maya. As the night progresses the Americans are introduced to Geordie's brother Sam (Nicholas Gunn), and Maya begins to suffer terrible nightmares. The group ultimately decides to try to summon the ghost of Lemon Tree Passage, only to find that this spurs on more strange occurrences.

== Cast ==
- Jessica Tovey as Maya
- Nicholas Gunn as Sam
- Pippa Black as Amelia
- Tim Phillipps as Geordie
- Andrew Ryan as Oscar
- Tim Pocock as Toby
- Piéra Forde as Brianna

== Production ==
Lemon Tree Passage was inspired by an urban legend surrounding a road by the same name in Port Stephens, which was the focus of a segment aired on Today Tonight in 2010. Director Campbell penned the script with Erica Brien and the bulk of the film's footage was shot in South Australia during September 2012. Additional footage, which included the addition of another character, was shot in March 2014. Financing for the film was raised privately.

== Reception ==
ScreenRelish gave a mixed review for Lemon Tree Passage, panning the film overall and stating that it was "a film that wants to send shivers down your spine (and certainly the promotional artwork does that in spades), but your brain is too preoccupied trying to figure out what’s going on, that it ultimately proves to be a somewhat dissatisfying experience." SBS wrote that while Campbell "[pulled] his weight" as a director, the film's script was flawed and that it was overall uneven.

== See also ==
- Cinema of Australia
