= Soldiers Point, New South Wales =

Soldiers Point
- Suburb
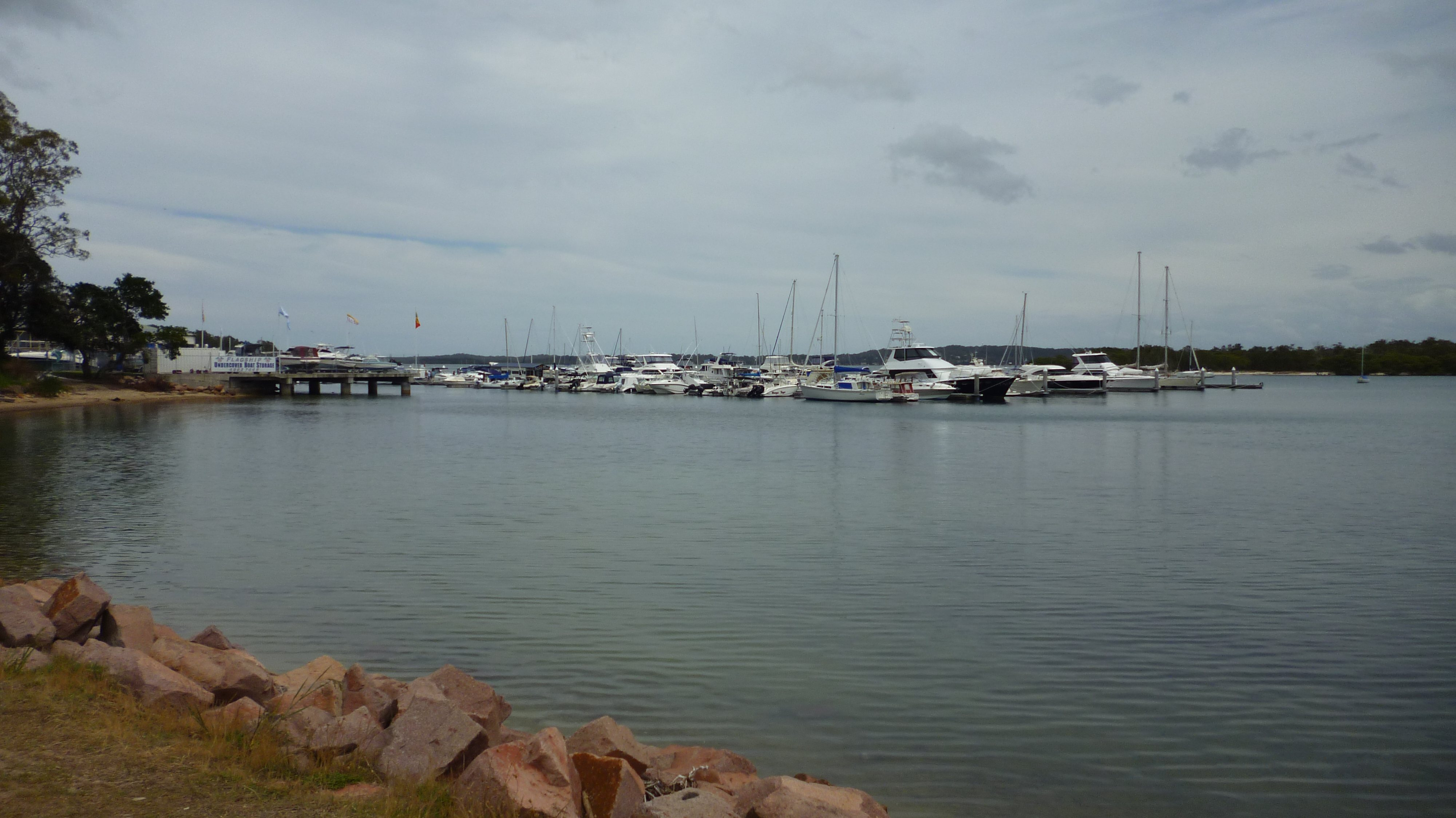
- Soldiers Point marina

- Interactive map of Soldiers Point
- Coordinates: 32°42′24″S 152°04′04″E
- Country: Australia
- State: New South Wales
- Region: Hunter
- LGA: Port Stephens Council
- Location: 204 km (127 mi) NNE of Sydney; 57 km (35 mi) NE of Newcastle; 42 km (26 mi) ENE of Raymond Terrace

Government
  - State electorate: Port Stephens
  - Federal division: Paterson

Area (Note: Area calculation is based on 1:100000 map 9232 NEWCASTLE.)
  - Total: 1 km^{2} (0.39 sq mi)

Population
  - Total: 1,564 (2021 census)
  - Density: 1,564/km^{2} (4,050/sq mi)
- Time zone: UTC+10 (AEST)
  - Summer (DST): UTC+11 (AEDT)
- Postcode: 2317
- County: Gloucester
- Parish: Tomaree
- Mean max temp: 27.3 °C (81.1 °F)
- Mean min temp: 8.4 °C (47.1 °F)
- Annual rainfall: 1,348.9 mm (53.11 in)
Suburbs around Soldiers Point
Port Stephens	Port Stephens	Port Stephens
Port Stephens	Soldiers Point	Port Stephens
Port Stephens	Salamander Bay	Port Stephens

Soldiers Point is a suburb of the Port Stephens local government area in the Hunter Region of New South Wales, Australia. Located on the southern shores of Port Stephens it is almost entirely surrounded by the port and is a popular location for fishing and boating. While primarily residential, like other suburbs around Port Stephens, it is a popular tourist destination, especially in summer months. It also has numerous community events and family fun days for locals and tourists alike.

The Worimi people originally called this point of land Carbah.

The area appears to have been a ceremonial site for the Worimi, due to the surveyor Charles Grimes observing a corroboree there in 1795. Grimes subsequently produced the first British chart of the region and named the site Friendship Point.

In 1824, the problem of runaway prisoners trying to walk to Sydney from the recently established Port Macquarie convict settlement, made the colonial authorities establish a small permanent military outpost at Port Stephens to intercept them. This garrison consisted of a corporal and five soldiers of the 57th Regiment. The outpost was situated at Friendship Point, which afterwards became known as Soldiers Point.

In July 2016, the New South Wales government declared 5.9 ha (14.6 acres) of the suburb as an Aboriginal place, recognising that Soldiers Point was a special place for cultural, spiritual and historic reasons to the Worimi people.
