= Lemon Tree Passage, New South Wales =

Lemon Tree Passage
- Suburb
- Interactive map of Lemon Tree Passage
- Coordinates: 32°43′57″S 152°2′18″E
- Country: Australia
- State: New South Wales
- Region: Hunter
- LGA: Port Stephens Council
- Location: 194 km (121 mi) NNE of Sydney; 47 km (29 mi) NE of Newcastle; 32 km (20 mi) ENE of Raymond Terrace

Government
  - State electorate: Port Stephens
  - Federal division: Paterson

Area (Note: Area calculation is based on 1:100000 map 9232 Newcastle. The area presented is that of the whole suburb. The residential portion of the suburb is only 1.4 square kilometres (0.5 sq mi) or 44% of the total area.)
  - Total: 3.2 km^{2} (1.2 sq mi)

Population
  - Total: 2,686 (SAL 2021)
  - Density: 839.38/km^{2} (2,174.0/sq mi) (Note: This is the average density of the whole suburb. However, approximately 1.8 square kilometres (0.7 sq mi) (56%) of the suburb is uninhabited. The average population density for the inhabited portion of the suburb is higher at 1,415 inhabitants per square kilometre (3,660/sq mi).)
- Time zone: UTC+10 (AEST)
  - Summer (DST): UTC+11 (AEDT)
- Postcode: 2319
- County: Gloucester
- Parish: Sutton
- Mean max temp: 27.3 °C (81.1 °F)
- Mean min temp: 8.4 °C (47.1 °F)
- Annual rainfall: 1,348.9 mm (53.11 in)
Suburbs around Lemon Tree Passage
Port Stephens	Port Stephens	Port Stephens
Mallabula	Lemon Tree Passage	Port Stephens, Lemon Tree Passage
Tilligerry Creek	Tilligerry Creek	Port Stephens

Lemon Tree Passage is a suburb of the Port Stephens Local Government Area in the Hunter Region of New South Wales, Australia, located at the end of the Tilligerry Peninsula and surrounded by the waters of Port Stephens. At the 2021 census it had a population of 2,686. It is a haven for koalas due to it being densely wooded. The town has a small marina and the local industry is oyster farming.

The suburb is separated from nearby Bulls Island by a small strait which is also known as Lemon Tree Passage.

Lemon Tree Passage has been the focus of an urban legend that states that if a motorist speeds down Lemon Tree Passage Road, they will experience supernatural phenomena. This urban legend provided the focus for the 2013 horror/thriller film Lemon Tree Passage.

The Bureau of Meteorology maintains a monitoring station which includes a radar in the high forested area.

== History ==
The Worimi people are the traditional occupiers of the Port Stephens area.

It was subdivided in 1962 and grew from only 30 residents in 1931.
