= Salterns Marina =

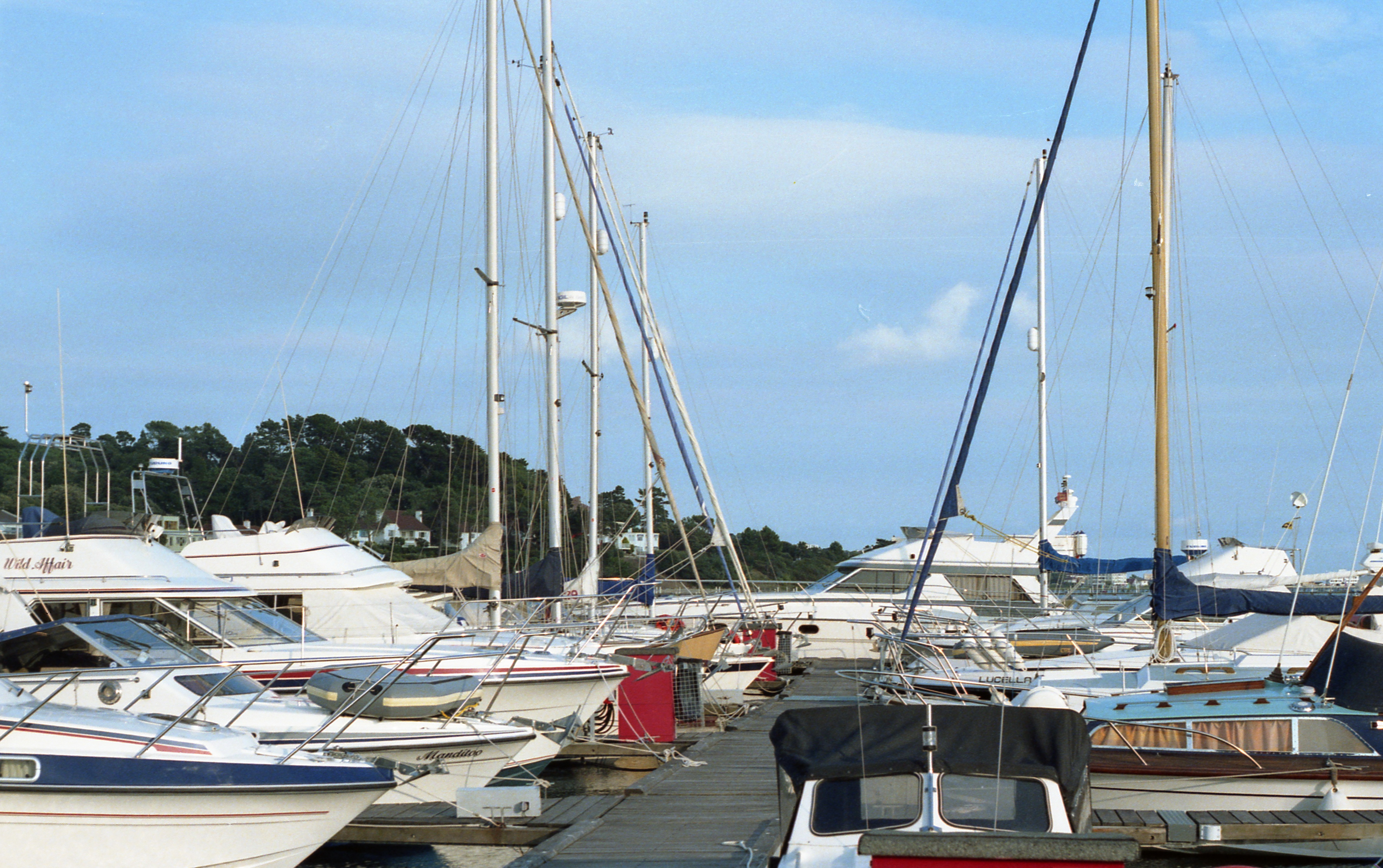
Salterns Marina, Poole.

Salterns Marina is a coastal area of Poole, Dorset. The marina is west of Lilliput.

== History ==
In April 2021, the demolition of the historic Salterns Hotel was started. A 150 million pound project is planned for the area.

== Facilities ==
Sailing is an activity held at the marina.

== Politics ==
Salterns Marina is part of the Poole parliamentary constituency.
