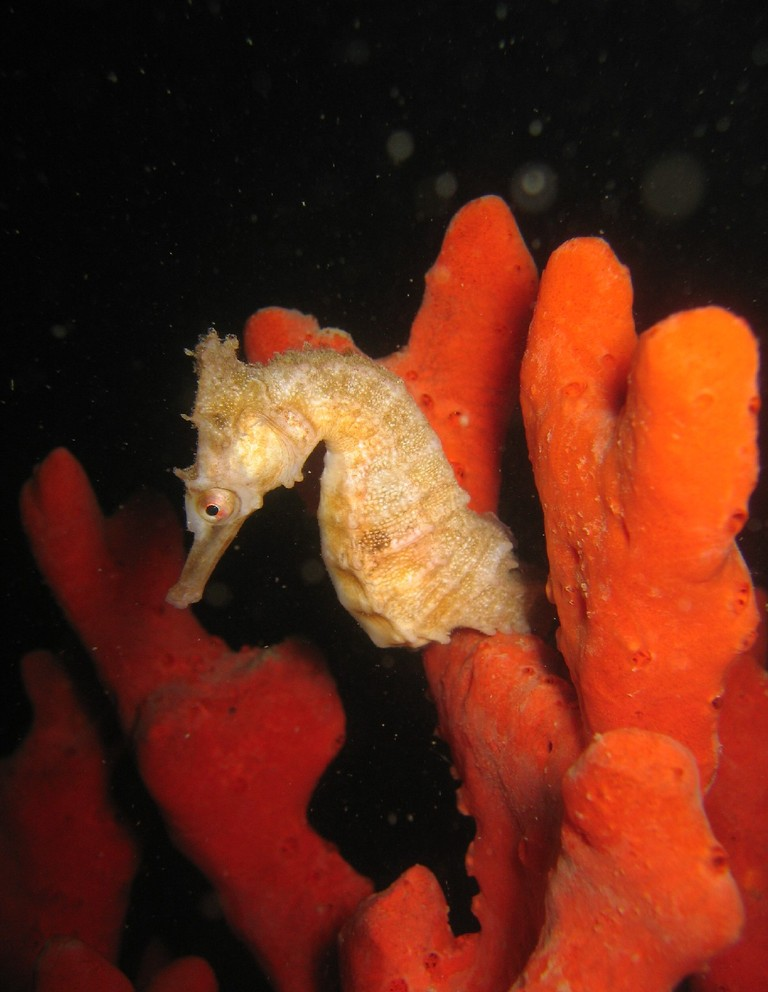

Conservation status
- Endangered (IUCN 3.1)
- CITES Appendix II

Scientific classification
- Kingdom: Animalia
- Phylum: Chordata
- Class: Actinopterygii
- Order: Syngnathiformes
- Family: Syngnathidae
- Genus: Hippocampus
- Species: H. whitei

Binomial name
- Hippocampus whitei Bleeker, 1855

Synonyms
- Hippocampus novaehollandae Steindachner, 1866; Hippocampus procerus Kuiter, 2001

= New Holland seahorse =

Species of fish

Hippocampus whitei, commonly known as White's seahorse, New Holland seahorse, or Sydney seahorse, is a species of marine fish of the family Syngnathidae. It is thought to be endemic to the Southwest Pacific, from Sydney, New South Wales and southern Queensland (Australia) to the Solomon Islands. It lives in shallow, inshore habitats, both natural and anthropogenic. This species is ovoviviparous, with males brooding eggs in a brood pouch before giving birth to live young.

== Identification ==
H. whitei is a small fish, reaching a maximum size of 13 centimetres (5.1 in). Distinctive characteristics include a narrow head, moderate to high coronet, a long snout (about half of overall head length), moderately sized spines above the eyes, and low single or double cheek spines. Further spines on the body can be quite variable, ranging from low and rounded to moderately developed and sharp.

Individuals of this species are generally pale to dark brown or black, although some are entirely yellow. Often, they have pale, saddle-like markings at the first, fourth and eighth trunk rings, and on tail rings with enlarged spines. The underside of the snout typically has fine bars and dusky lines which get broader near the eyes. The nasal spine and surrounding area is pale.

== Habitat ==
H. whitei inhabits shallow, weedy inshore areas, usually at depths of 1–25 metres (3.3–82.0 ft). Its natural habitats include Zostera seagrass beds, sponges, kelp holdfasts, macroalgae, and corals, but it can also be found under jetties and on other anthropogenic structures, such as shark nets. Evidence from Port Stephens indicates that juveniles prefer gorgonian habitats (Euplexaura sp.), while adults prefer sponges and soft coral habitats. This species is known to show a preference for more complex habitats, likely because their camouflage is more effective in these environments, making avoiding predators easier. Additionally, prey of H. whitei are significantly more abundant in complex habitats, increasing food availability. Observed increases in the use of artificial habitats by H. whitei are likely driven by the continued loss of their natural habitats.

== Ecology ==
=== Feeding and predation ===
This carnivorous species feeds on small crustaceans such as harpacticoid, caprellid and cyclopoid copepods, gammarid amphipods, caridean shrimp, and mysids, similar to other seahorse species.

Predators of H. whitei include invertebrates, fishes, sea turtles, waterbirds and marine mammals. Most of the species' predators are considered generalist feeders, suggesting that H. whitei are not targeted as prey.

=== Reproduction ===
H. whitei is an ovoviviparous species, with females using an ovipositor to transfer eggs into a male's brood pouch, where they are fertilized and protected until the male gives birth to live young. Males may brood 100–250 embryos at a time, and after a three-week gestation period, give birth to about 150 young. Males brood several times a season. Newborns are about 8.5 millimetres (0.33 in) long and morphologically similar to adults. They grow rapidly and are able to reproduce early. This species displays strong site fidelity and seasonal monogamous mating.

== Population ==
Population information for H. whitei is available from two estuaries in Australia: Port Stephens and Port Jackson. Surveys in Port Stephens indicate a steep decline in H. whitei abundance, with two site surveys (the Pipeline and Seahorse Gardens) estimating 95–98% population decline from 2006-2015. This trend has been correlated with significant declines in preferred seahorse habitat. Population surveys in Port Jackson also indicate a decline, with a site survey (the protective swimming enclosure of Manly Harbour) estimating 40% population decline from 2008-2015. Based on the available survey data, it is expected that overall population declines of 50–70% have occurred.

== Threats ==
The major threat experienced by H. whitei is habitat loss. This species occurs along some of the most highly populated estuaries in Australia, in which habitats tend to be the most impacted by coastal development, pollution, destructive boat anchoring and sedimentation. Impacts are likely amplified by the species' site fidelity and specific habitat preferences.

Since this species is protected in Australia, there has been no reported legal trade of them in the last five years. Small numbers caught in bycatch may be illegally traded, but this is not thought to pose a significant conservation threat.

== Conservation ==
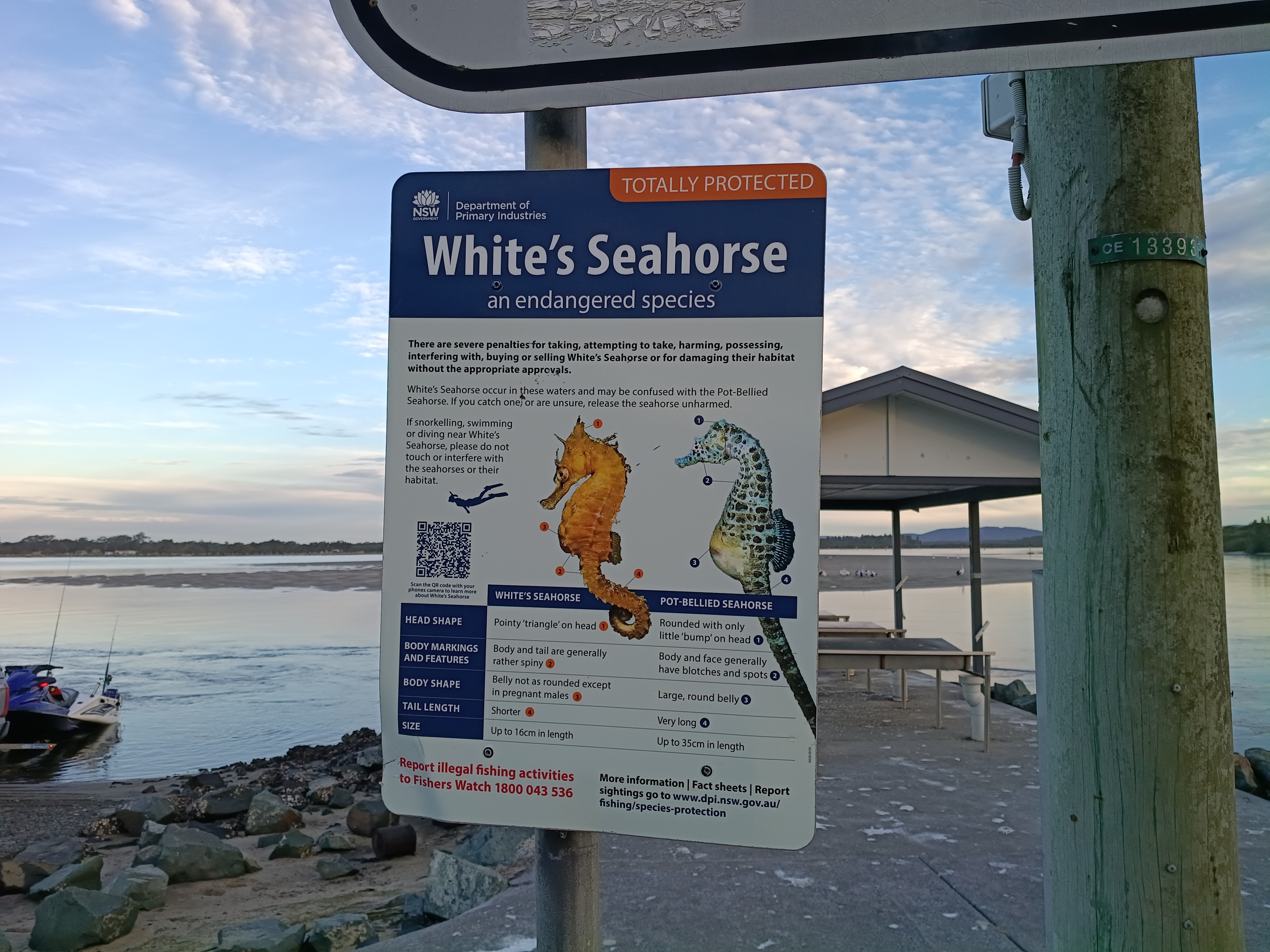
NSW Government sign on White's Seahorse (Hippocampus whitei) in NSW.

H. whitei is protected under the New South Wales Fisheries Management Act (1999), and all Hippocampus species are listed under Appendix II of the Convention on International Trade in Endangered Species (CITES), which regulates the legal import and export of seahorses.
