= Stockton Beach =

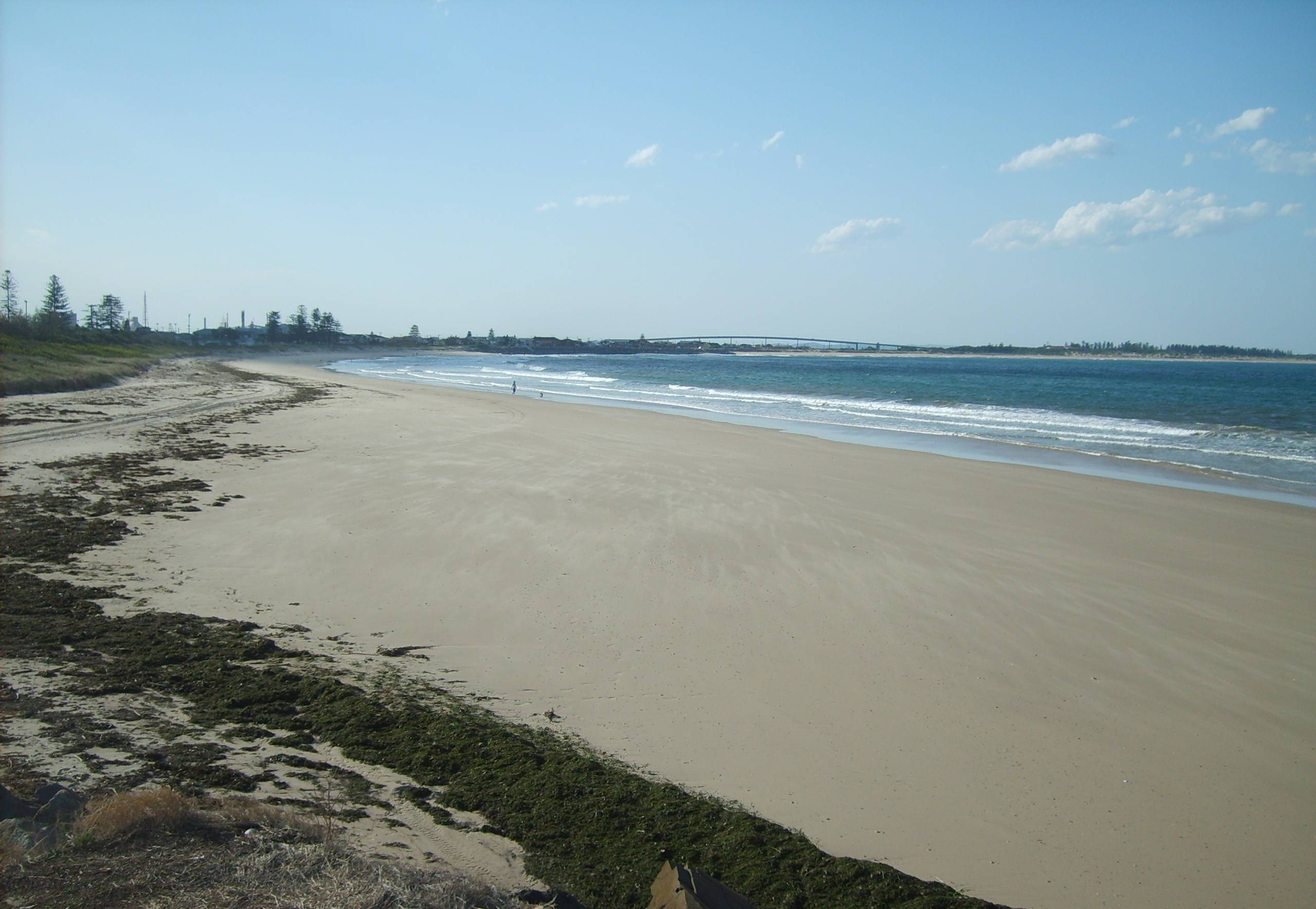
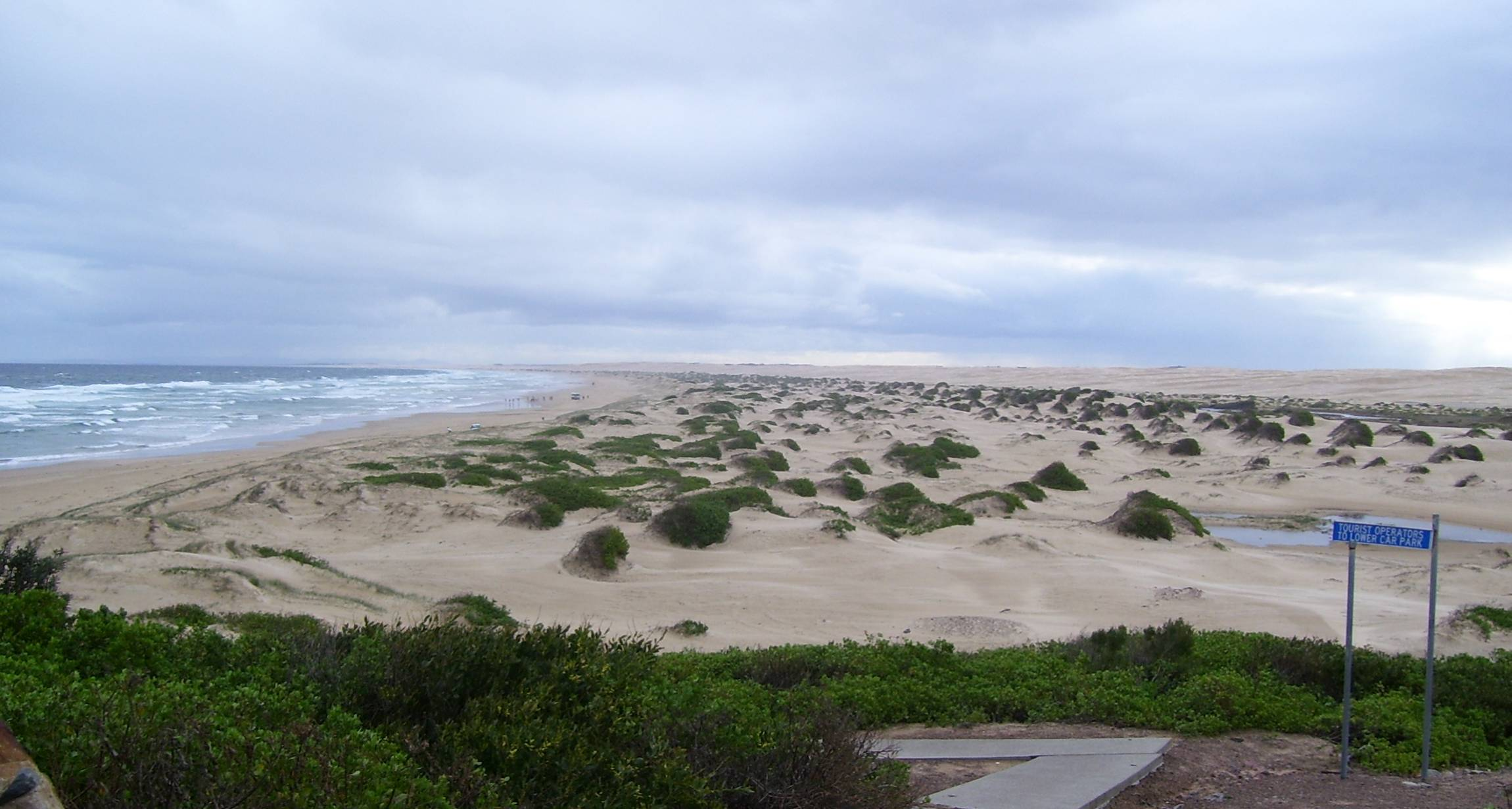
- Southern end of Stockton Beach seen from Shipwreck walk North-eastern end of the beach at Anna Bay

- Coordinates: 32°49′54″S 151°54′4″E
- Country: Australia
- State: New South Wales
- Region: Hunter
- LGAs: City of Newcastle; Port Stephens Council
- Location: 32 km (20 mi) from Stockton to Anna Bay

Stockton Beach is located north of the Hunter River in New South Wales, Australia. It is 32 km (20 mi) long and stretches from Stockton, to Anna Bay. Over many years Stockton Beach has been the site of numerous shipwrecks and aircraft crashes. In World War II it was fortified against a possible attack by Imperial Japanese forces. During that time it served as a bombing and gunnery range as well as a dumping area for unused bombs by aircraft returning from training sorties. The length of the beach, its generally hard surface and numerous items of interest along the beach make it popular with four-wheel drive (4WD) enthusiasts. Four-wheel drive vehicles are permitted to drive on Stockton Beach provided the vehicles are in possession of valid permits. The beach is also popular with fishermen and several different varieties of fish may be caught.

== Geography ==
Stockton Beach, on the Tasman Sea, starts on the northern side of the break wall that protects the entrance to Newcastle harbour in Stockton, Newcastle's northernmost suburb, and stretches for 32 km (20 mi) in an approximate north-easterly direction to Anna Bay in Port Stephens. In some areas it is as much as 1 km (0.6 mi) wide and has dunes over 30 metres (98 ft) high although at the Stockton end it is at its narrowest with no dunes. Each year the dunes move north by approximately 4 m (13 ft). The sand on Stockton Beach varies from hard to soft packed and changes daily with the changing winds and weather. The dunes are the largest continuous mobile dunes in the Southern Hemisphere.

=== Beach endpoint coordinates ===
- Southern – 32°55′1″S 151°47′25″E
- Northern – 32°47′7″S 152°4′27″E

=== Worimi conservation lands ===
A large part of Stockton Beach lies within the Worimi conservation lands, which stretch from south-west of the wreck of the MV Sygna, north-east along Stockton Beach to just west of the end of the beach at Anna Bay. The lands consist of the 1,826 ha (4,512-acre) Worimi National Park, 1,042 ha (2,575-acre) Worimi State Conservation Area and 1,568 ha (3,875-acre) Worimi Regional Park. Day-to-day management of the Worimi conservation lands is undertaken by the NSW National Parks & Wildlife Service.

== History ==
=== Aboriginal history ===
External image
- Aboriginal middens

The earliest inhabitants of the Port Stephens region and particularly the land close to Port Stephens itself were the members of the Worimi Aboriginal tribe and their middens may be seen at many points along the beach. These middens, which are up to 12,000 years old, consist mainly of the remnants of pipis and whelk shells. As the beach is constantly reshaped by the winds some middens are concealed while new ones are revealed. A midden conservation area, where beach driving is not permitted due to the cultural significance of the middens, has been established on the beach.

=== Tin City ===
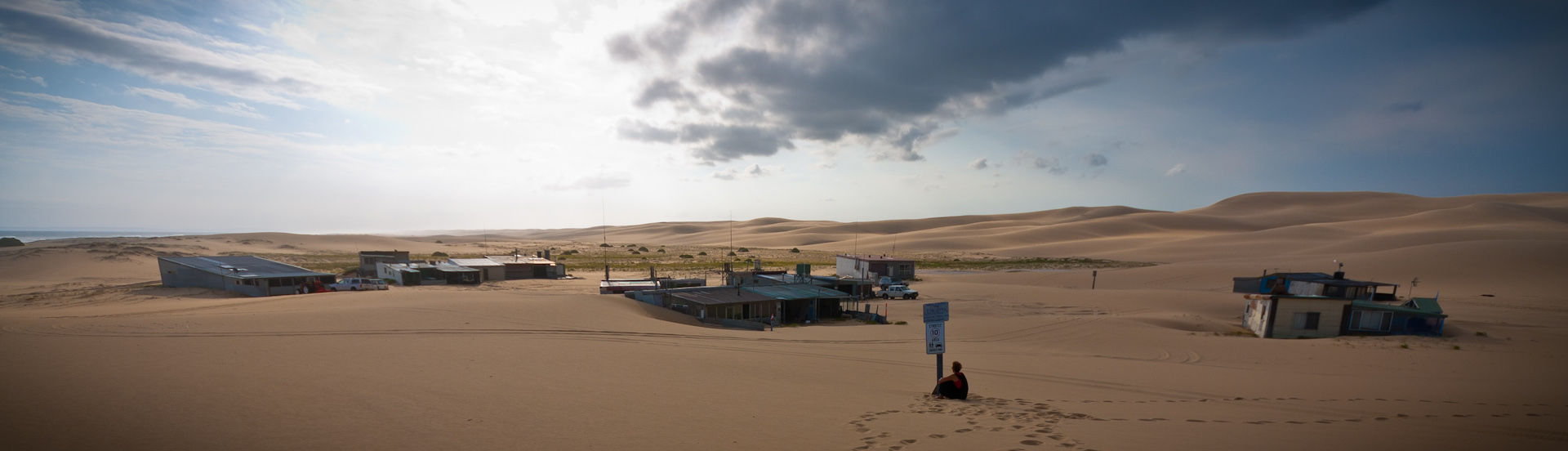
Tin City

In the late 19th century shipwrecks on Stockton Beach were so common that two tin sheds were constructed on a part of the beach in what is now Bobs Farm near Salt Ash to hold provisions for shipwrecked sailors. During the Great Depression of the 1930s a group of squatters constructed a series of tin shacks at the site which is approximately 11 km (6.8 mi) south west of Anna Bay. During World War II the shacks were torn down to make way for an Army camp. Today, eleven of the shacks, known collectively as "Tin City", remain but no new shacks may be built, nor can existing shacks be rebuilt if they are destroyed by the elements.

=== Wartime history ===
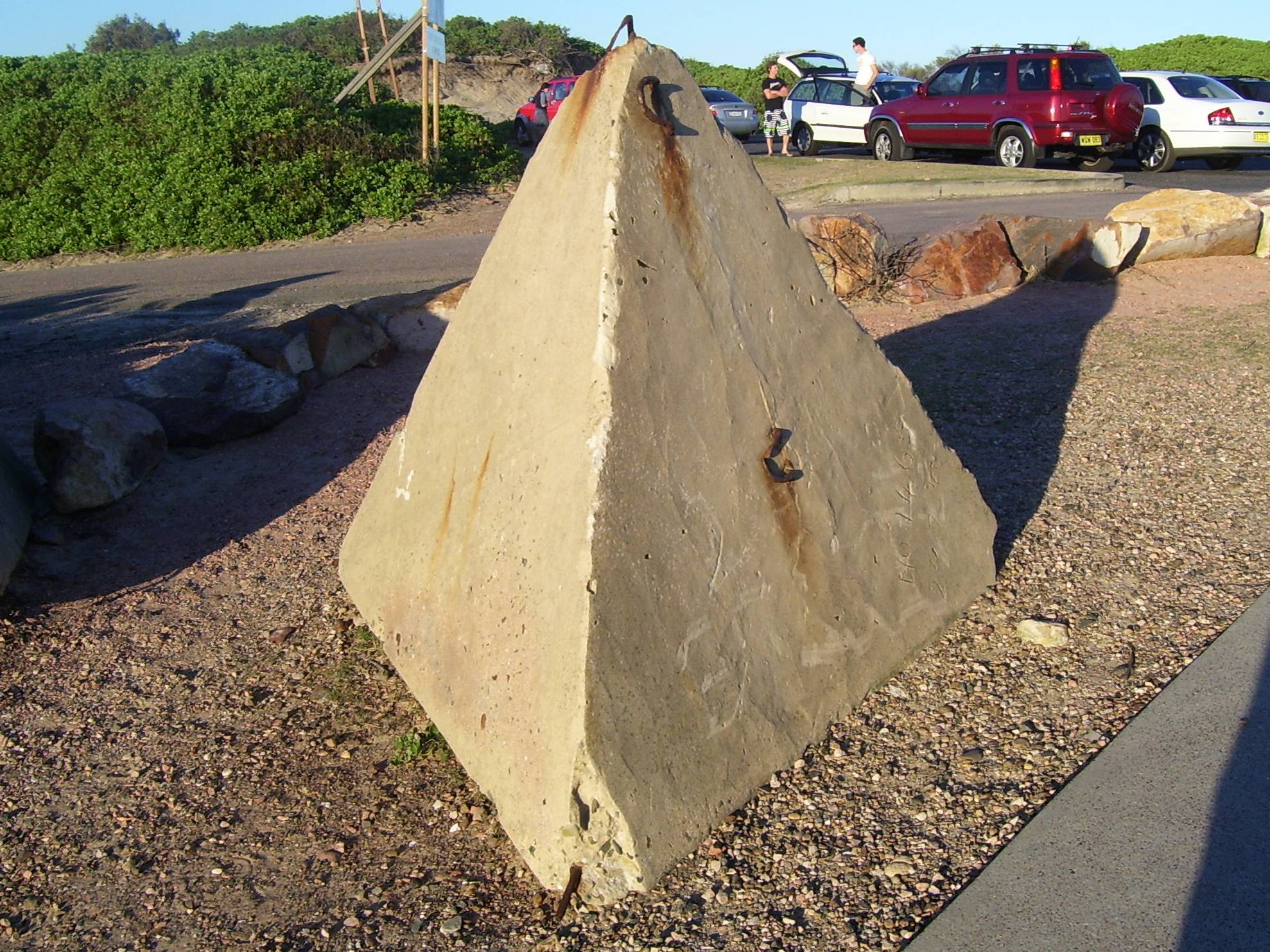
Tank trap at the northern end of the beach in Anna Bay

World War II resulted in fortifications against a possible amphibious assault by Imperial Japanese forces being installed along the beach. Many of these fortifications, in the form of barbed wire entanglements and concrete pyramid shaped blocks, commonly known as tank traps, may be seen along the beach. Some of the tank traps from the northern end of the beach have been removed and relocated to near the parking area at Birubi Point in Anna Bay while most from the southern end of the beach may be found outside Fort Wallace in Stockton. Some of the tank traps remain submerged and pose a hazard to swimmers.

During World War II the beach was used as a military bombing range and Air Force pilots used to regularly drop unused bombs on the beach before landing at RAAF Base Williamtown. To this day it is occasionally possible to see exposed bombs in the sand.

Stockton Beach is less than 3.5 km (2.2 mi) from RAAF Base Williamtown and is subjected to many overflights by both RAAF and civilian aircraft. On 10 February 1960 a CAC CA-27 Sabre from RAAF Base Williamtown crashed on the beach after overshooting its approach. The pilot was killed. The remains of this aircraft appear from time to time.

=== Leigh Leigh ===
In 1989 Newcastle High School student and Fern Bay resident Leigh Leigh was brutally raped and murdered on a section of the beach at Stockton. The attack was so vicious that it was spoken about at length in the Parliament of New South Wales and referred to for years after the event. A play, Blackrock (written by Australian playwright Nick Enright), and also a film of the same name, were both inspired by the event.

=== National park ===
A series of campaigns by local environmental groups and activists saw parts of the area declared a National Park in 2001.

=== Shipwrecks ===
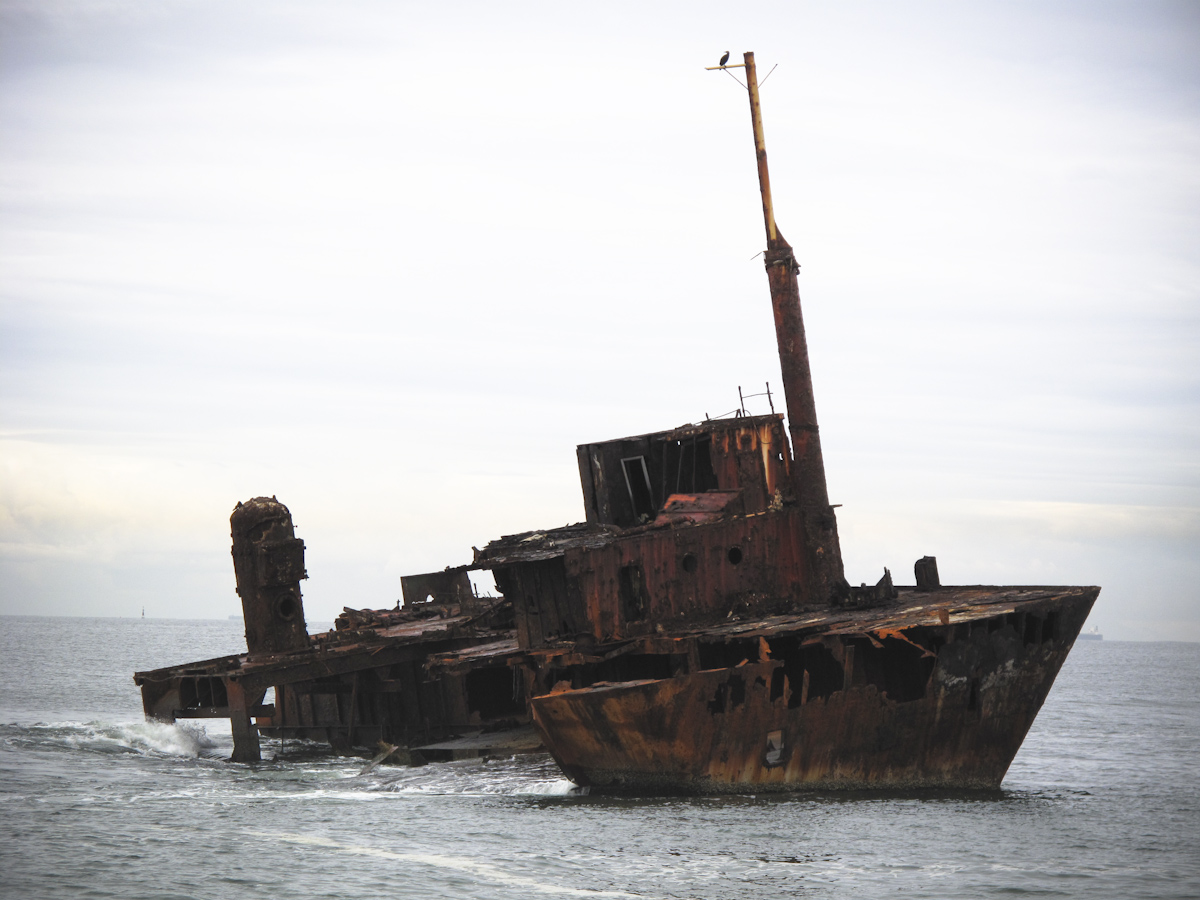
The MV Sygna on Stockton Beach in June 2009

Stockton Beach has been the site of numerous shipwrecks over the past 200 years but especially since the late part of the 19th century. Wreckage from many shipwrecks continues to wash ashore periodically but the most well known, recognisable and permanent of the wrecks are the Uralla and the MV Sygna.

The Uralla was a 537-tonne (529-long-ton), 46.4 m (152.2 ft) long steamer that ran aground during a gale on 14 June 1928 approximately 9 km (5.6 mi) down the beach from Anna Bay. There was no loss of life but after the vessel was eventually refloated it drifted ashore and broke up. Its remains may be seen occasionally at low tide.

The MV Sygna was a 53,000 t (52,163 long tons) Norwegian bulk carrier that ran aground during a major storm on 26 May 1974. Attempts to refloat the ship were unsuccessful. The ship broke its back and the stern now lies off Stockton Beach where it is slowly decaying in the elements. The bow section was eventually towed to Taiwan and broken up. The ship is approximately 8.8 km (5.5 mi) from the southern end of the beach and usually easily visible from the Stockton breakwall. On a clear day the ship is easily visible from both ends of the beach.

== Tourism ==
The beach is a popular camping area, at times there can be 200 camp sites with 2,000 people camped along the dunes. During the day, up to 4,000 people and thousands of cars can be on the beach.

== Vehicular access ==
A 4WD vehicle heading toward the waterfront after entering Stockton Beach via Lavis Lane.

No vehicular access is possible at the southern end of the beach. Instead, all vehicles must enter the beach through the Worimi Conservation Lands in the Port Stephens local government area. Vehicle entry to the beach is via Lavis Lane in Williamtown or Gan Gan Road in Anna Bay. A permit needs to be purchased before entering the beach. Drivers must ensure that they respect the natural habitat of the beach and refrain from driving on the plants and grasses on dune structure. Access to the recreational vehicle area is subject to restrictions.

The beach is at its widest near the Lavis Lane entrance.

== Sand mining ==
Sand mining is practised on Stockton beach. This has led to a significant loss of tertiary vegetation in the hind dunes of the beach which has led to a noticeable decrease in the numbers of native species sightings, for example the eastern grey kangaroo and sugar glider. There is considerable opposition to the controversial sand mining.

== Coastal maintenance ==
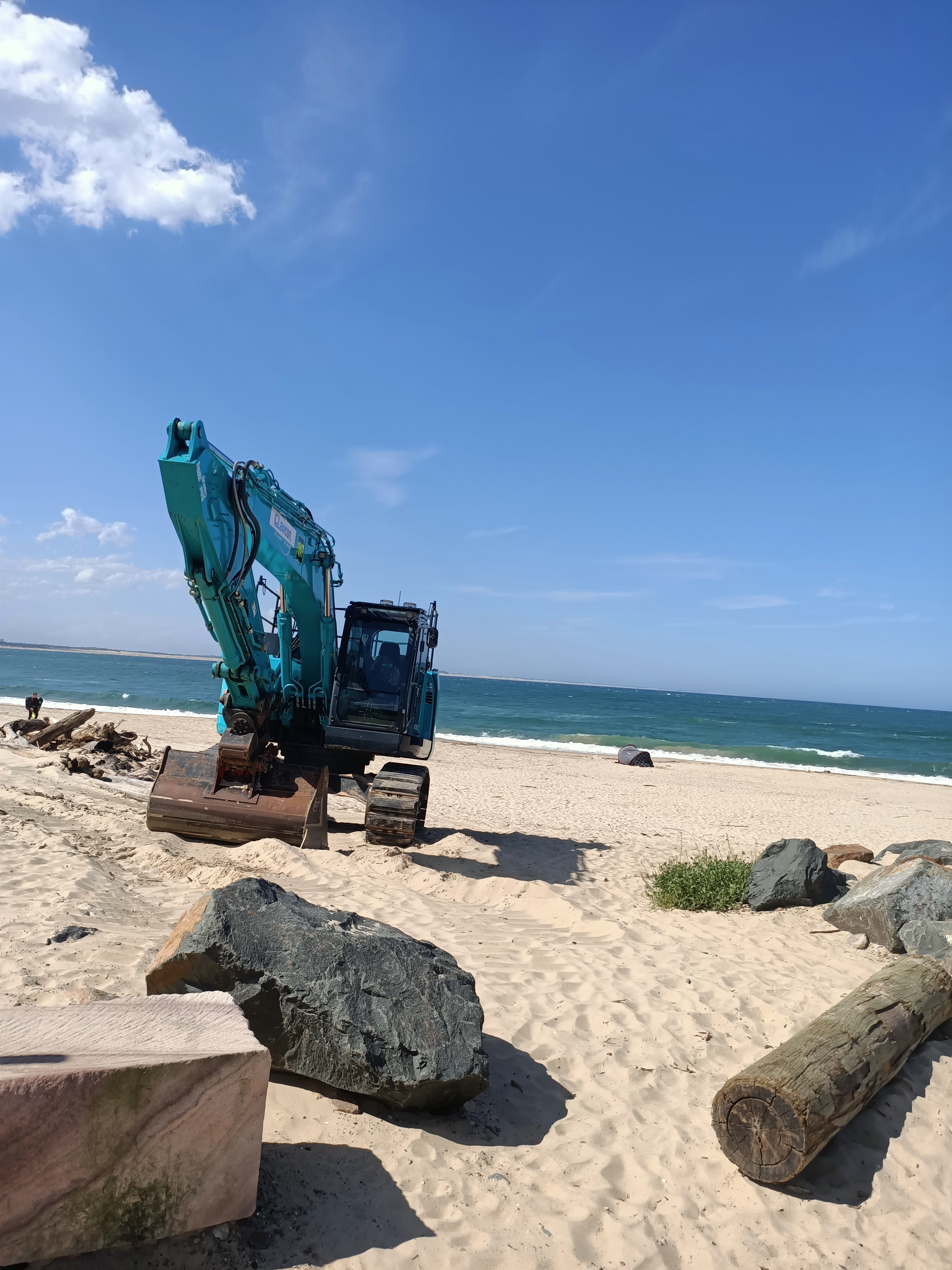
Excavator doing coastal maintenance at Stockton beach in 2025

The beach undergoes regular coastal maintenance to manage erosion and storm impacts. Works include removing debris and driftwood after storms and replenishing sand through beach nourishment. These activities form part of the Stockton Coastal Management Program (2020) and the Stockton Beach Repair Project, led by the NSW Government and the City of Newcastle, to restore beach usability and protect coastal assets.

== Wildlife ==
The waters just off Stockton Beach form part of a larger nursery for great white sharks. The Great white sharks in the nursery are thought to range in size from 1.5 to 3 m (4.9 to 9.8 ft). Humpback whales can be spotted from the beach each year during the migration season.

== Big Beach Challenge ==
Since 2010, an annual event called the "Big Beach Challenge" is held which sees competitors travel the entire length of Stockton Beach from Birubi to Stockton Surf Club. Some of the top runners manage to cover this in under three hours, whilst those who walk the distance finish in around seven. A shorter 16 km (10 mi) event from Stockton to the shipwreck of the Sygna and back is also held at the same time. The Big Beach Challenge helps raise money for local Stockton charity, Harry's House.

== Gallery ==
External images
- Aerial shot of Tin City
- Aerial shot of Tin City
- Shack at Tin City
- Wreck of the Uralla
- Various aerial photos of the beach
- A gallery of 72 photographs of the beach

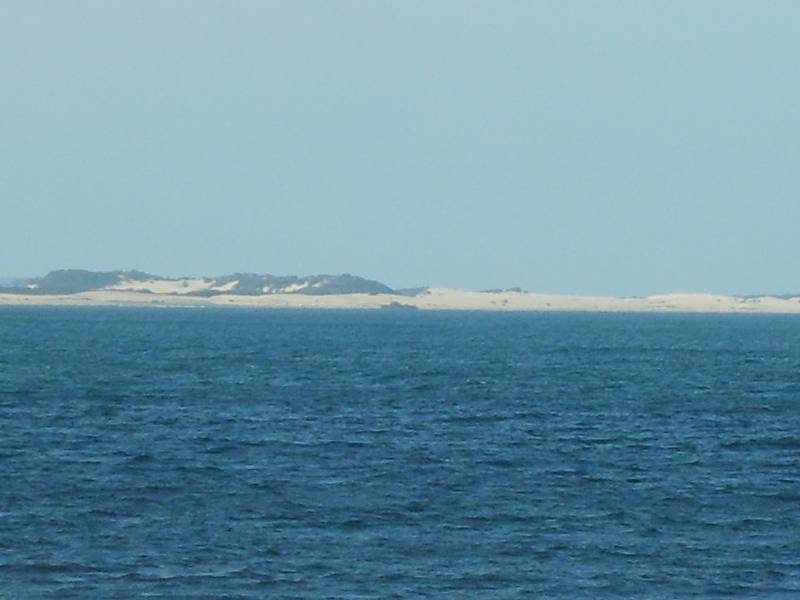
Wreck of the MV Sygna as seen from southern end of the beach, approximately 8.8 km (5.5 mi) to the south-west

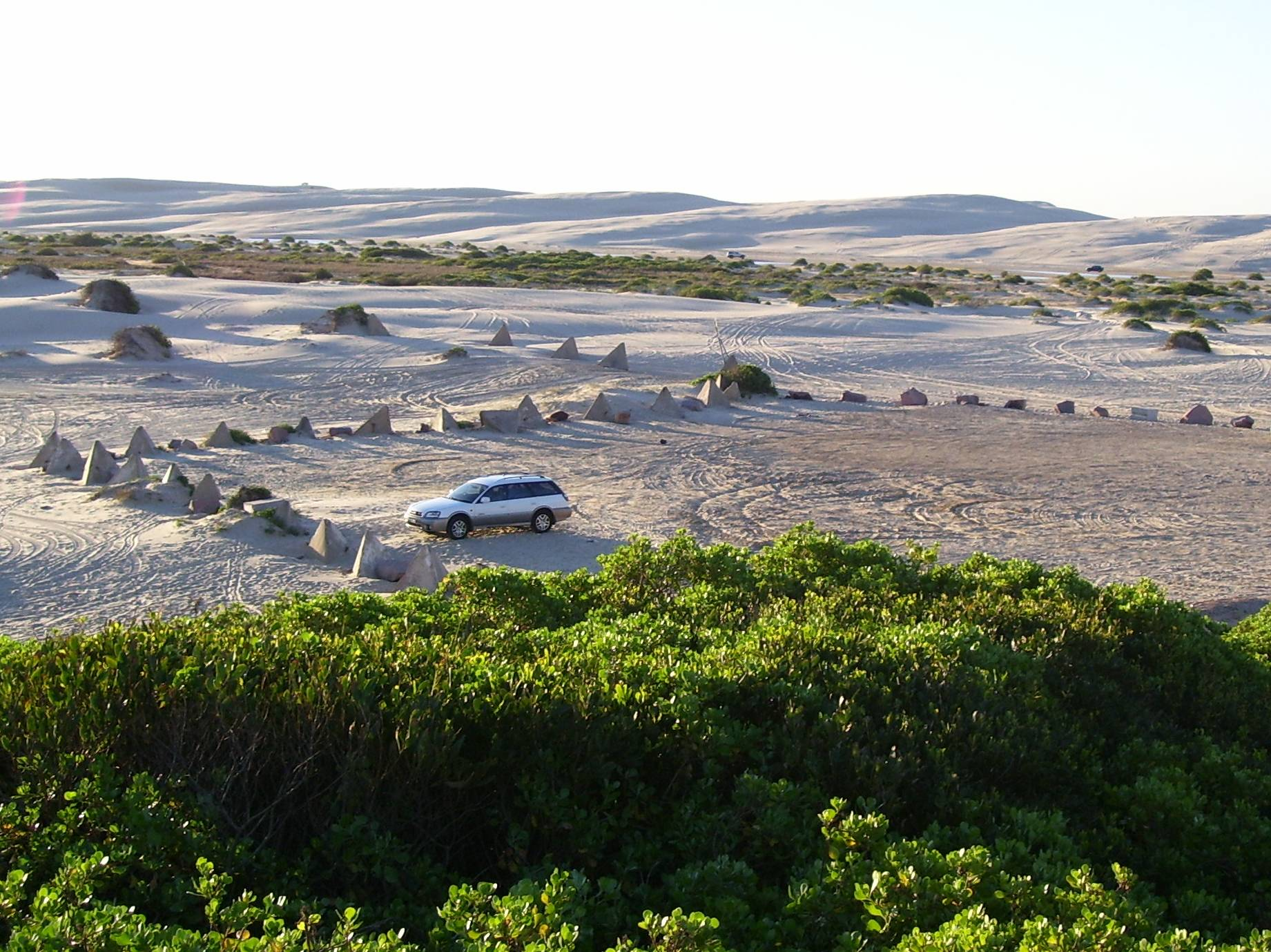
World War II tank traps surrounding lower car park at the northern end of the beach in Anna Bay

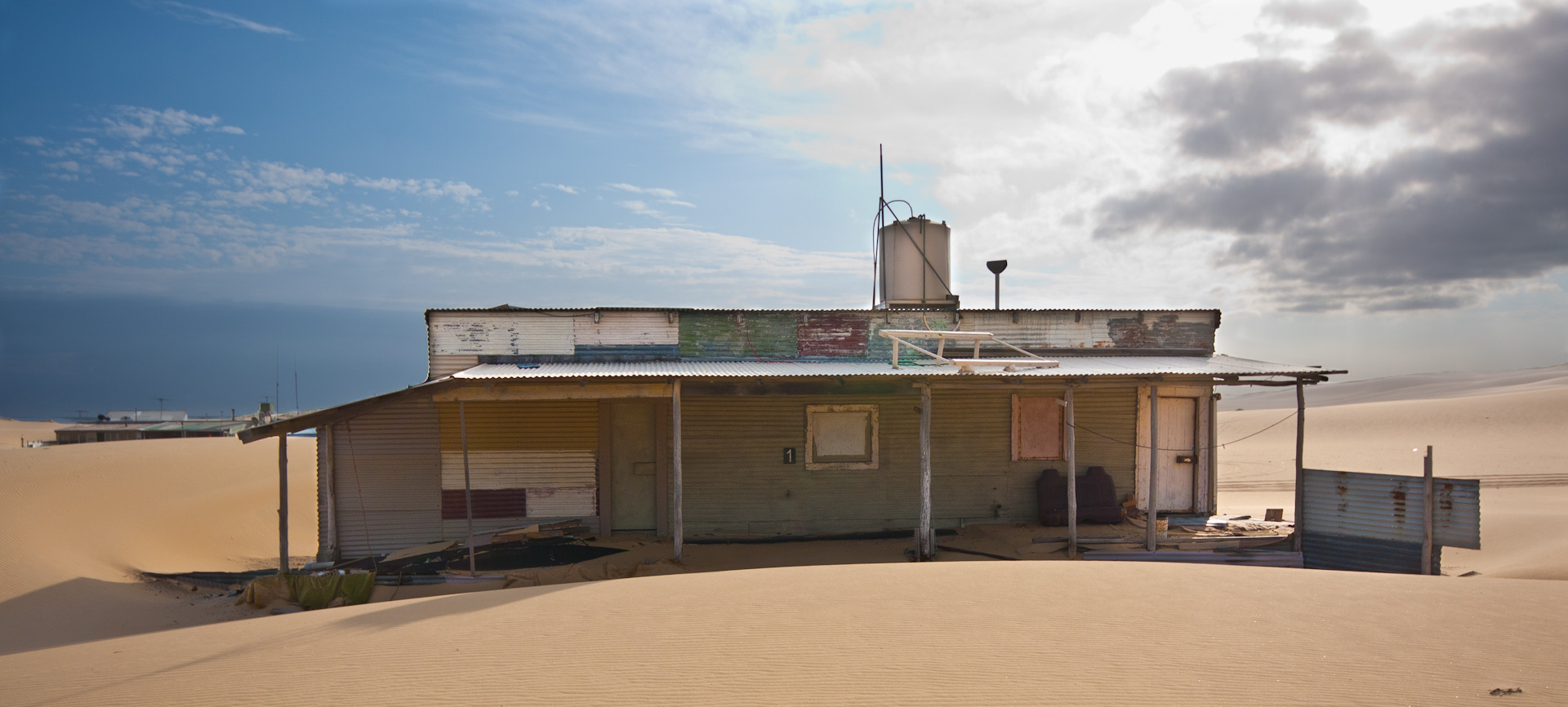
A Tin City shack

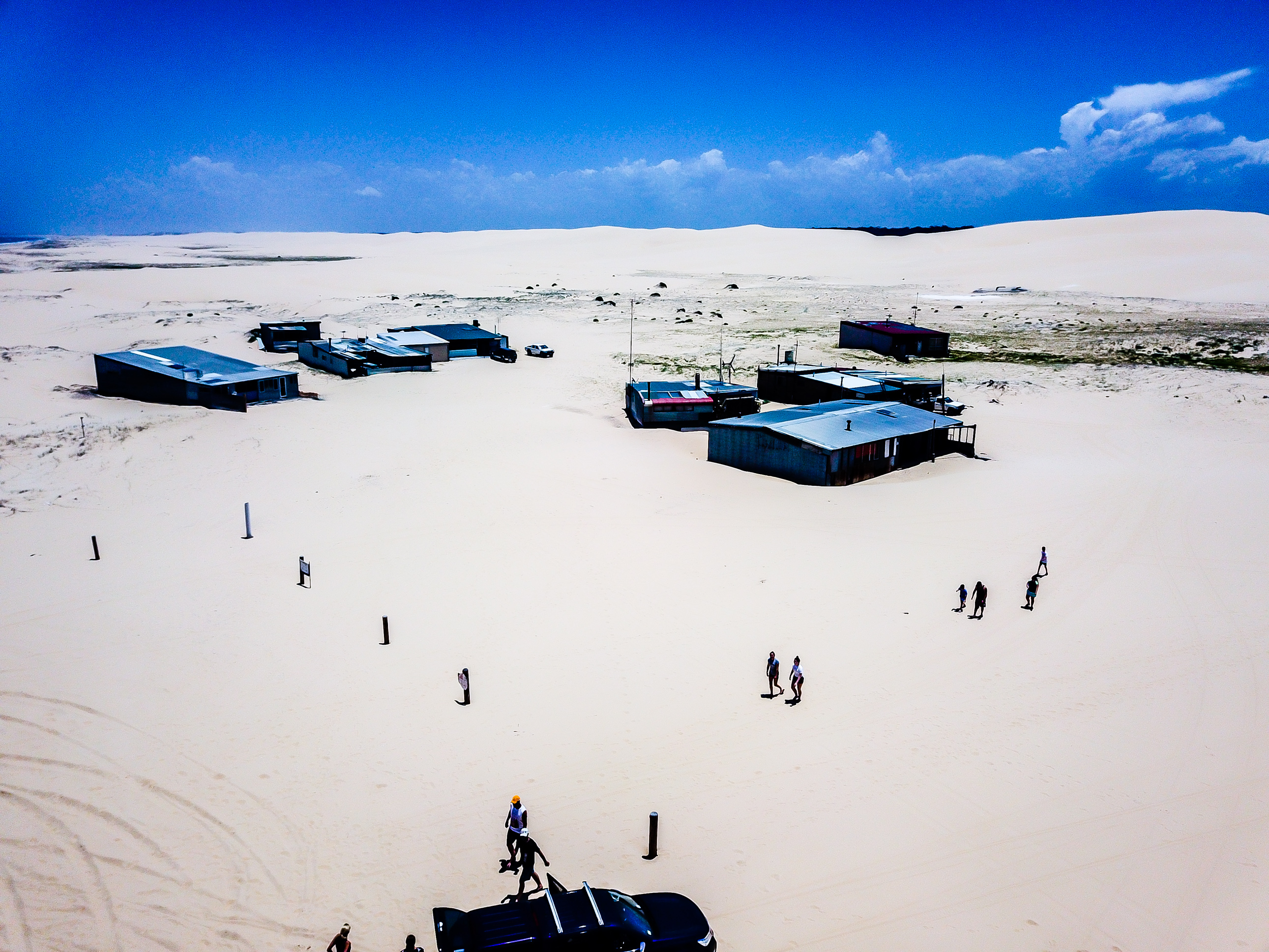
Aerial view of Tin City

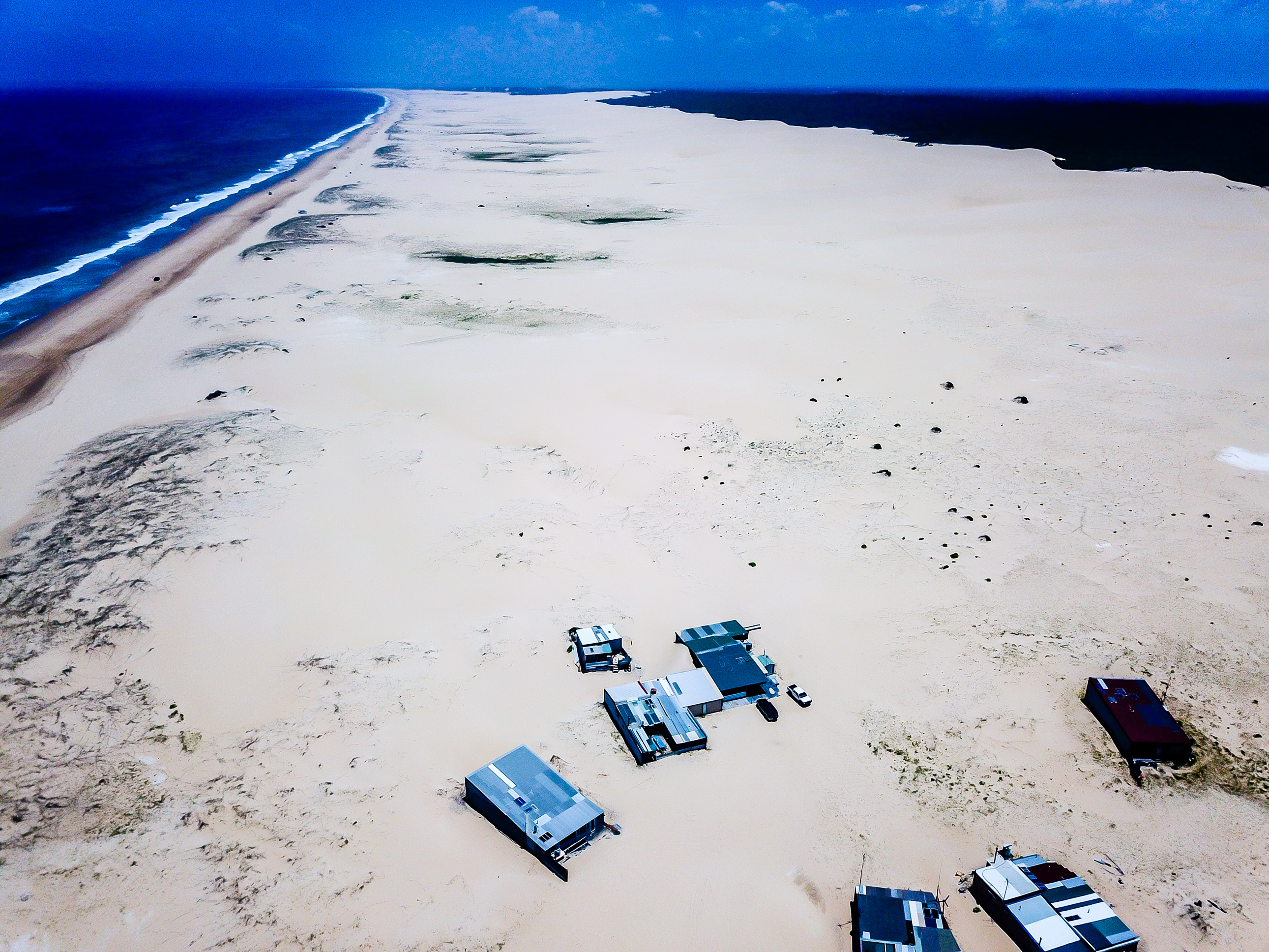
Aerial view of Stockton Beach and Tin City
