= Bobs Farm =

- Suburb
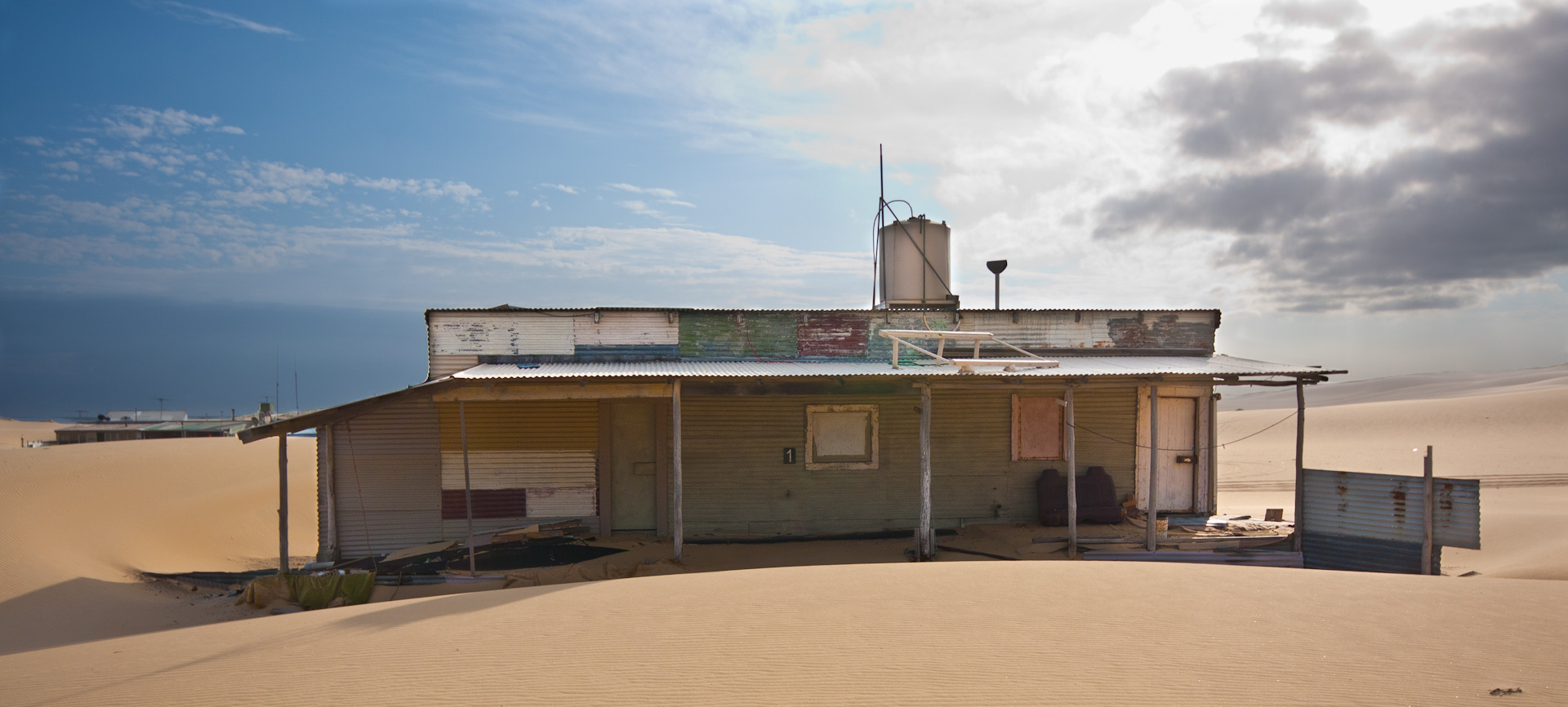
- Building at Tin City, on Stockton Beach

- Interactive map of Bobs Farm
- Coordinates: 32°46′35″S 151°58′21″E
- Country: Australia
- State: New South Wales
- Region: Hunter
- LGA: Port Stephens Council
- Location: 191 km (119 mi) NNE of Sydney; 43.8 km (27.2 mi) NE of Newcastle; 29 km (18 mi) E of Raymond Terrace

Government
  - State electorate: Port Stephens
  - Federal division: Paterson

Area (Note: Area calculation is based on NSW GNB maps and 1:100000 maps 9332 PORT STEPHENS and 9232 NEWCASTLE.)
  - Total: 37.3 km^{2} (14.4 sq mi)
- Elevation (Note: Bobs Farm is primarily flat however it does have some elevated areas. The figure presented represents the average elevation throughout most of the suburb as shown on topographic maps 93323N MORNA POINT and 92322N WILLIAMTOWN (1:25000 scale).): 7.2 m (24 ft)

Population
  - Total: 662 (2021 census)
  - Density: 17.75/km^{2} (46.0/sq mi) (Note: ABS quickstats data includes part of Anna Bay in Bobs Farm. The density figure shown is for the entire area used by the ABS, not just for that part which is in Bobs farm.)
- Time zone: UTC+10 (AEST)
  - Summer (DST): UTC+11 (AEDT)
- Postcode: 2316
- County: Gloucester
- Parish: Tomaree
- Mean max temp: 27.3 °C (81.1 °F)
- Mean min temp: 8.4 °C (47.1 °F)
- Annual rainfall: 1,348.9 mm (53.11 in)
Suburbs around Bobs Farm
Tilligerry Creek	Tilligerry Creek	Port Stephens
Tilligerry Creek, Salt Ash	Bobs Farm	Anna Bay
Salt Ash, Tasman Sea	Tasman Sea	Tasman Sea

Bobs Farm is a sparsely populated rural suburb of the Port Stephens local government area in the Hunter Region of New South Wales, Australia. It is on the main road between Newcastle and Nelson Bay and is home to a number of small, boutique style vineyards and wineries and a thriving aquaculture industry. Bobs Farm Public School on Marsh Road is a co-educational government primary school which was established in 1918.

== History ==
The Worimi people are the traditional owners of the Port Stephens area. The area was named after a guy named Bob.

=== Timorese internment ===
Contrary to the law, civilians who had been evacuated from the colony of Portuguese Timor to escape the Japanese invaders were interned in the former military camp at Bobs Farm during the Second World War. They had supported the Allies in the Battle of Timor. Even official Australian sources describe the living conditions in the camp as harsh.

== Geography ==
Bobs Farm is the first suburb of the Tomaree Peninsula when travelling towards Nelson Bay. It is bounded on the north almost entirely by Tilligerry Creek. A small part at the north-eastern end of the northern border meets Port Stephens. The southern border is occupied entirely by Stockton Beach.

== Demographics ==
Most of the suburb's population lies along the two main roads in the area, Marsh Road and Nelson Bay Road. Tin City, a collection of squatters shacks, is built on Stockton Beach near the border between Bobs Farm and Salt Ash.

== Aquaculture industry ==
Bobs Farm is the centre of a thriving, environmentally friendly, aquaculture industry that exports technology. In 2007 pioneering aquaculture technology, based around a recirculating system that is the only one in the world to provide consistent reproduction, was sold for the creation of six farms in the United States. As of 2007, discussions were in progress with companies in Africa, the Middle East, Europe and Asia. An education and tourism centre was constructed at the site of Tailor Made Fish Farms in 2007. In addition to it being environmentally friendly and providing consistent results, the technology developed at Bobs Farm is expected to reduce capitalisation costs.
