= Fishermans Bay, New South Wales =

Fishermans Bay New South Wales
- Coordinates: 32°47′16″S 152°5′24″E
- Population: 76 (SAL 2021)
- Postcode(s): 2316
- Area: 1.2 km^{2} (0.5 sq mi) (Note: Area calculation is based on 1:100000 map 9332 PORT STEPHENS.)
- Time zone: AEST (UTC+10)
  - Summer (DST): AEDT (UTC+11)
- Location: 201 km (125 mi) NNE of Sydney; 53 km (33 mi) NE of Newcastle; 38 km (24 mi) E of Raymond Terrace
- LGA(s): Port Stephens Council
- Region: Hunter
- County: Gloucester
- Parish: Tomaree
- State electorate(s): Port Stephens
- Federal division(s): Paterson
| Mean max temp | Mean min temp | Annual rainfall |
| 27.3 °C; 81 °F | 8.4 °C; 47 °F | 1,348.9 mm 53.1 in |
Suburbs around Fishermans Bay:
| Anna Bay | Anna Bay | Boat Harbour |
| Anna Bay | Fishermans Bay | Boat Harbour |
| Tasman Sea | Tasman Sea | Tasman Sea |

Fishermans Bay is a small suburb of the Port Stephens local government area in the Hunter Region of New South Wales, Australia. It is located on the coast of the Tasman Sea adjacent to Anna Bay. A large part of the eastern portion of the suburb is occupied by Tomaree National Park and only a very small portion of the south western corner of the suburb is populated. The suburb is named after the adjacent bay.
