= One Mile, New South Wales =

One Mile
- Suburb
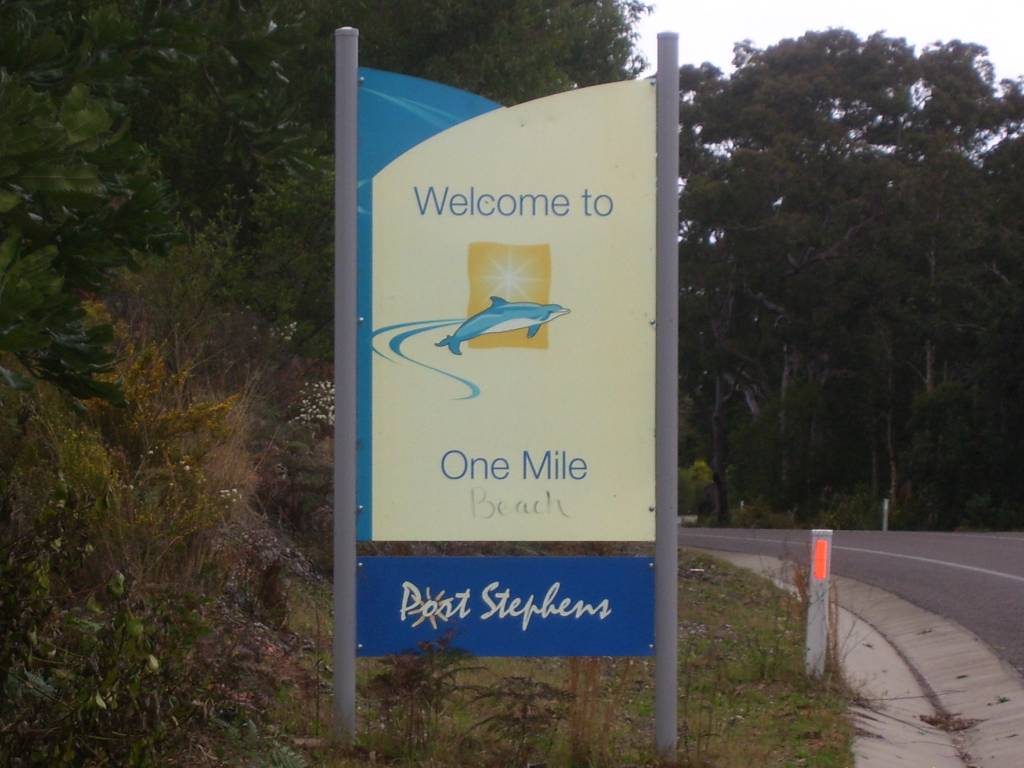
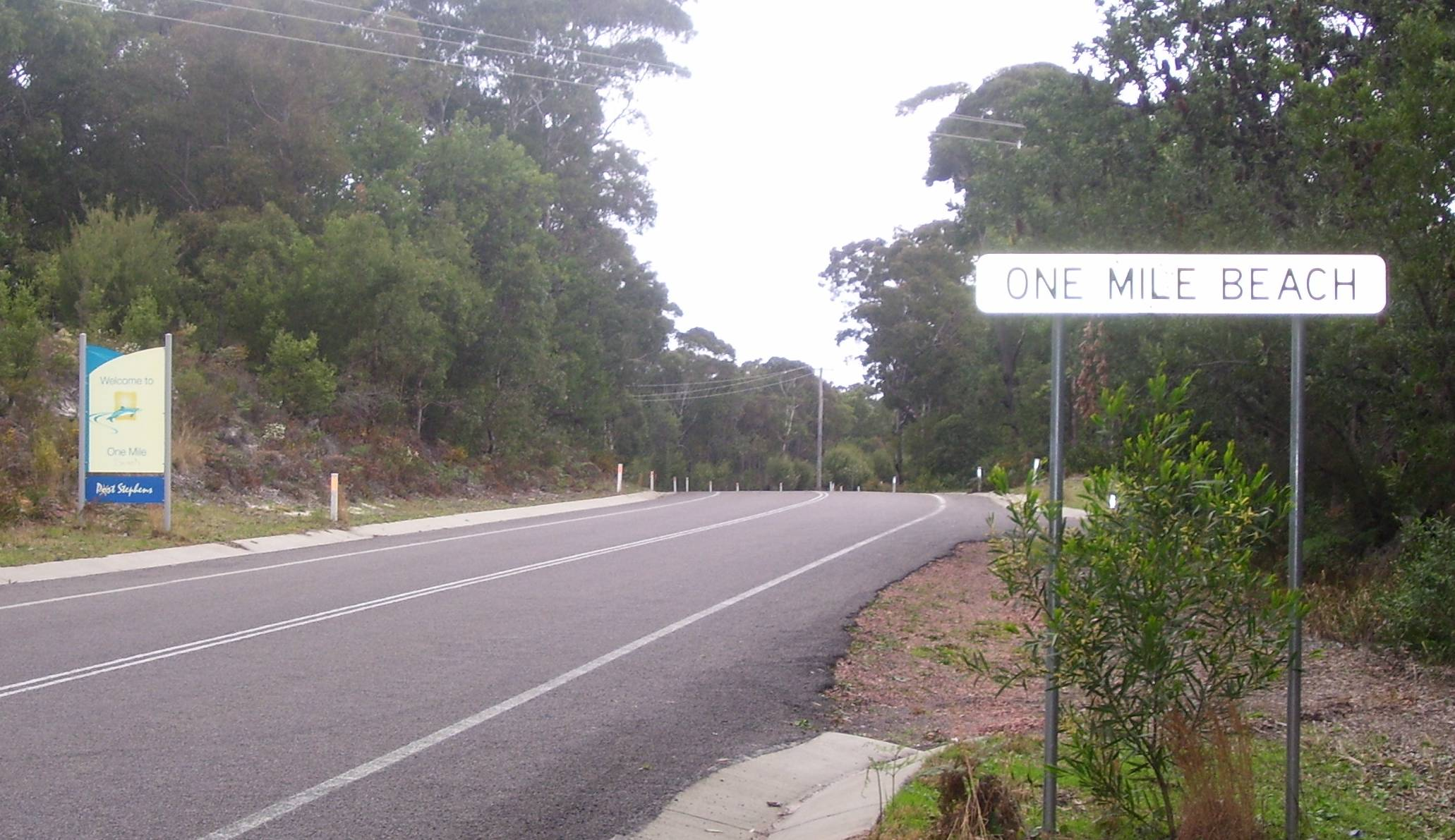
- Road sign at the northern entrance to One Mile Road signs identifying suburb as both One Mile and (incorrectly) One Mile Beach

- Coordinates: 32°46′S 152°6.76′E
- Country: Australia
- State: New South Wales
- Region: Hunter
- LGA(s): Port Stephens Council
- Location: 202 km (126 mi) NNE of Sydney; 55 km (34 mi) NE of Newcastle; 41 km (25 mi) ENE of Raymond Terrace

Government
  - State electorate(s): Port Stephens
  - Federal division(s): Paterson

Area (Note: Area calculation is based on 1:100000 map 9232 NEWCASTLE.)
  - Total: 4.7 km^{2} (1.8 sq mi)

Population
  - Total(s): 501 (2021 census)
  - Density: 106.6/km^{2} (276/sq mi)
- Time zone: UTC+10 (AEST)
  - Summer (DST): UTC+11 (AEDT)
- Postcode: 2316
- County: Gloucester
- Parish: Tomaree
- Mean max temp: 22.9 °C (73.2 °F)
- Mean min temp: 14.4 °C (57.9 °F)
- Annual rainfall: 1,339 mm (52.7 in)
Suburbs around One Mile
Anna Bay	Nelson Bay, Fingal Bay	Fingal Bay
Anna Bay	One Mile	Tasman Sea
Anna Bay	Boat Harbour	Tasman Sea

One Mile is a suburb of the Port Stephens local government area in the Hunter Region of New South Wales, Australia. The Worimi people are the traditional owners of the Port Stephens area. The suburb is semi-rural with a small urban settlement, several eco-resorts and back-packer accommodations to the west of Gan Gan Road. On the beach side there is a residential land-lease community (Middlerock Home Village) and three tourist parks. The parks, two of which have licensed restaurants, are positioned to provide quick access to the suburb's two beaches. Since late 2017 Port Stephens Koala Hospital has been operating in the grounds of Treescape resort.

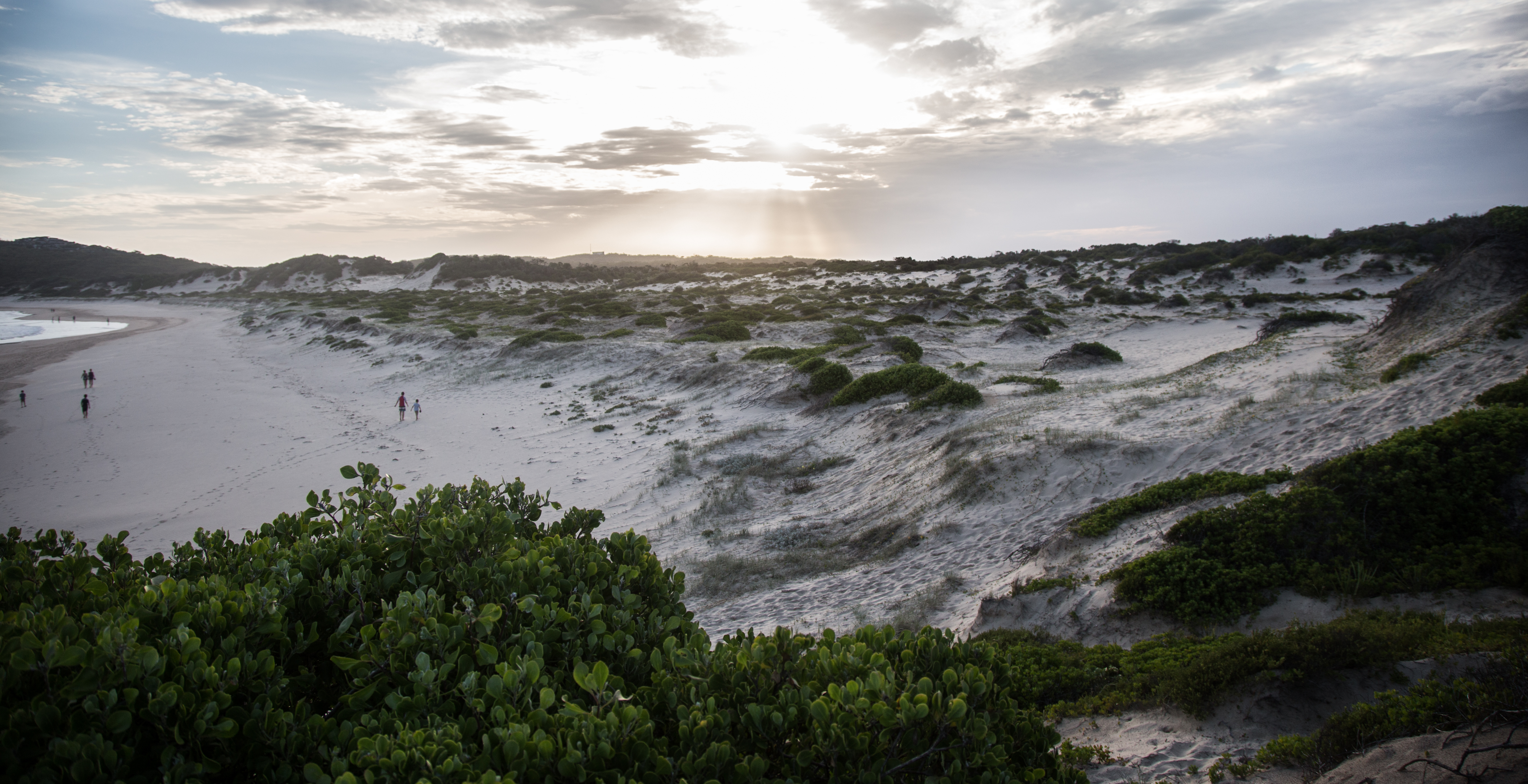
Sunset from the northern end of One Mile Beach

One Mile Beach, after which the area was named, is a family-friendly surf beach that is popular with tourists while Samurai Beach is accessible only by off-road vehicles and is clothing optional. Both beaches, like a large percentage of the locality, lie within the Tomaree National Park. The beaches form most of the coastline of Anna Bay which gave the adjacent suburb of Anna Bay its name. The beach has a Surf Club, kiosk, barbecue and picnics area as well as public amenities.

Although the suburb is formally called One Mile residents often refer to it as One Mile Beach. Until 2016, even some road signs identified the area incorrectly as One Mile Beach.
