= Anna Bay =

- Suburb
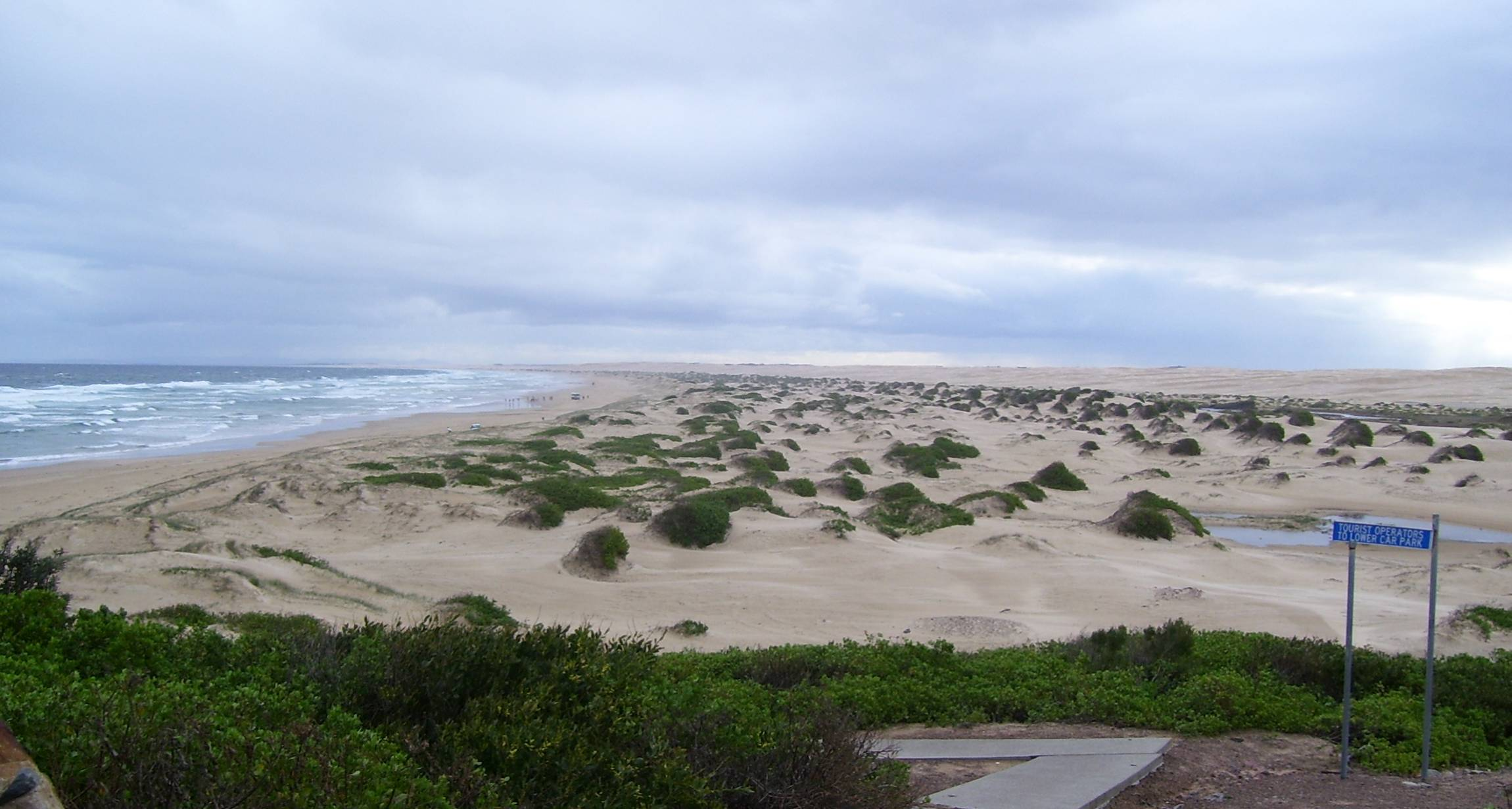
- North-eastern end of Stockton Beach at Anna Bay

- Interactive map of Anna Bay
- Coordinates: 32°46′S 152°05′E
- Country: Australia
- State: New South Wales
- Region: Hunter
- LGA: Port Stephens Council
- Location: 200 km (120 mi) NNE of Sydney; 51 km (32 mi) NE of Newcastle; 34 km (21 mi) E of Raymond Terrace

Government
  - State electorate: Port Stephens
  - Federal division: Paterson

Area (Note: The area calculation is based on NSW GNB maps for the whole suburb of Anna Bay. The area of Anna Bay and adjacent parts of Bobs Farm that was used to calculate the population density (see Notes 1 & 2 for further information) is 18.2 square kilometres (7.0 sq mi). Most of Anna Bay consists of unpopulated beaches and wetlands and sparsely populated rural areas. However, there are also some other residential areas, mainly on Nelson Bay Road, for which data is not available. For this reason the population density provided cannot be assumed to be representative of the whole suburb.)
  - Total: 23.1 km^{2} (8.9 sq mi)

Population
  - Total: 4,221 (2021 census) (Note: ABS Quickstats are not available for the geographically recognised suburb of Anna Bay or for just the township itself. The population figure stated in this article is for much of Anna Bay but includes some residents from adjacent Bobs Farm.)
  - Density: 182.73/km^{2} (473.3/sq mi) (Note: The population density provided here is for much of Anna Bay but includes some residents from adjacent Bobs Farm. See Note 1 above for more information.)
- Time zone: UTC+10 (AEST)
  - Summer (DST): UTC+11 (AEDT)
- Postcode: 2316
- County: Gloucester
- Parish: Tomaree
- Mean max temp: 27.3 °C (81.1 °F)
- Mean min temp: 8.4 °C (47.1 °F)
- Annual rainfall: 1,348.9 mm (53.11 in)
Suburbs around Anna Bay
Port Stephens, Taylors Beach	Taylors Beach, Salamander Bay	Nelson Bay
Bobs Farm	Anna Bay	One Mile, Boat Harbour
Tasman Sea	Tasman Sea, Fishermans Bay	Boat Harbour, Fishermans Bay

Anna Bay is the name of a suburb, a town and a bay in the Port Stephens local government area in the Hunter Region of New South Wales, Australia. The suburb and town are immediately adjacent to the north-eastern end of Stockton Beach and provide one of the major entry points to the beach at Birubi Point. Both were named after the bay of the same name which is located in the adjacent suburb of One Mile. According to legend, it was originally called Hannah Bay after an alleged shipwreck in 1851 but the vessel has never been identified. The name was changed by post service on 15 May 1896 as many locals were already referring to it as Anna Bay.

The Worimi people are the traditional owners of the Port Stephens area.

During World War II Stockton Beach was heavily fortified against a possible amphibious assault by Imperial Japanese forces and a line of tank traps was installed to prevent entry to the local area through the town. Many of the tank traps were removed after the war and now feature significantly around the car parking areas at Birubi Point. From here many tourists partake in organised beach tours and camel rides.

== Gallery ==
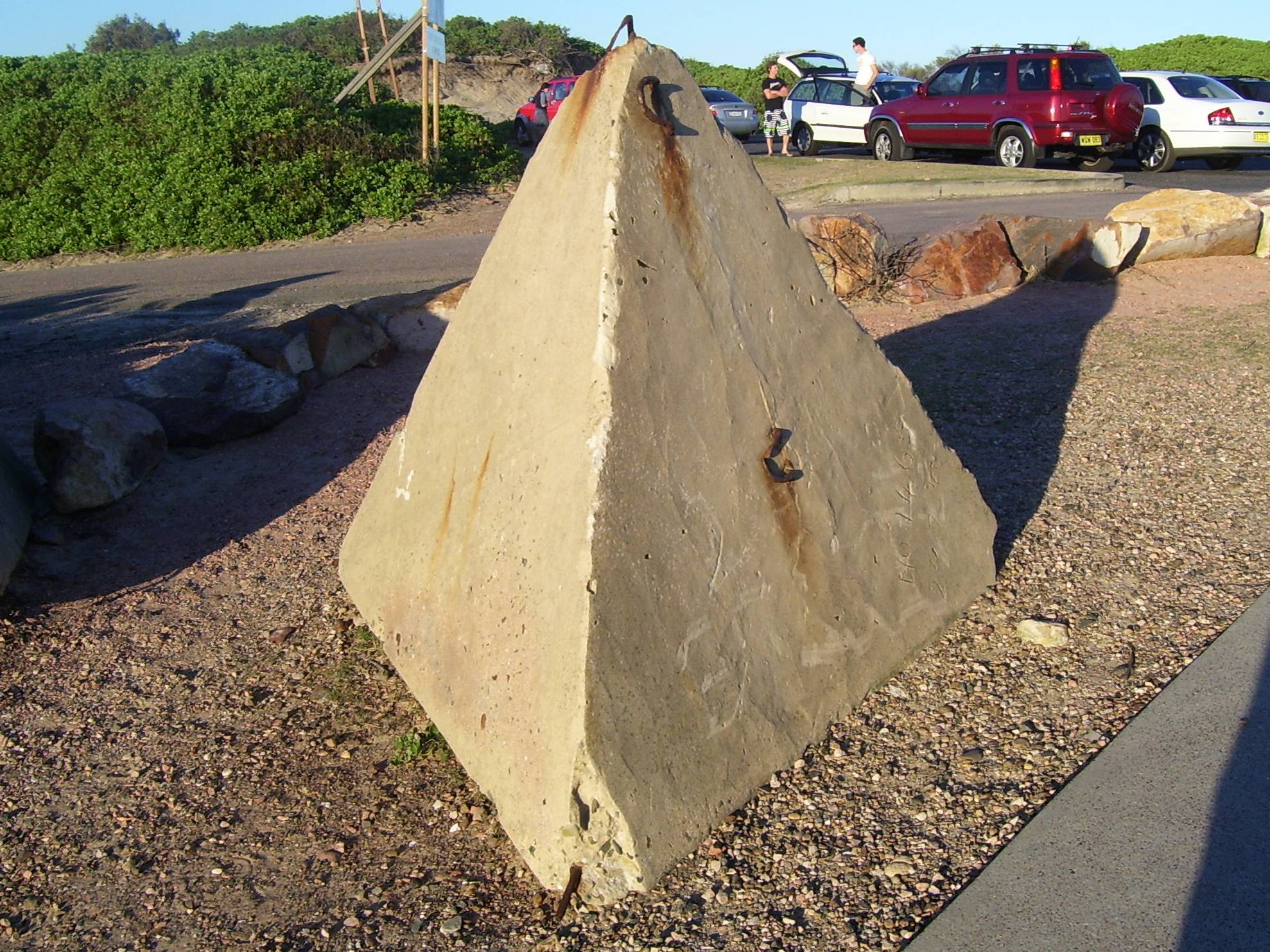
Tank trap at the northern end of Stockton Beach

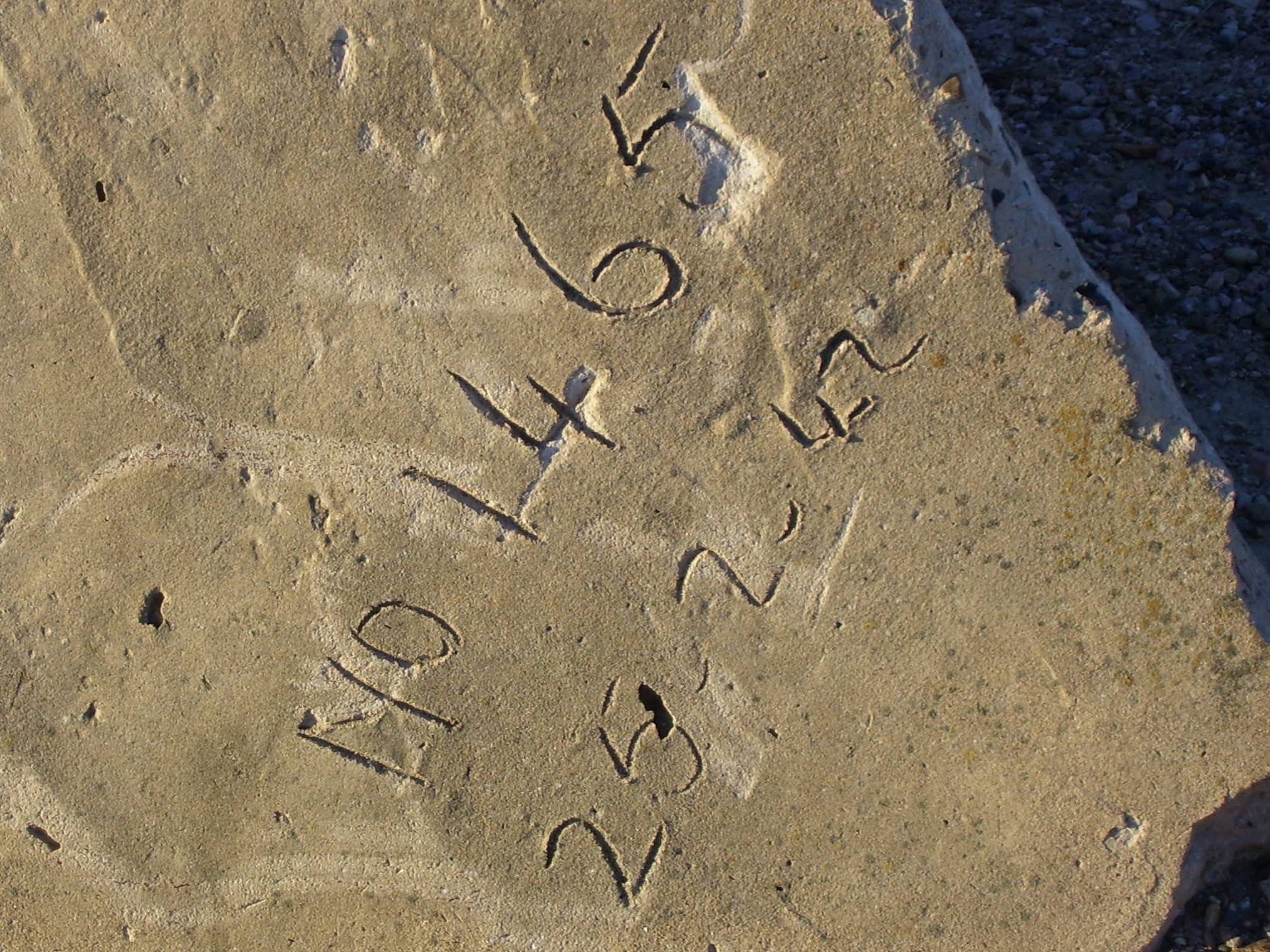
Part of tank trap at the northern end of Stockton Beach showing the World War II date stamp

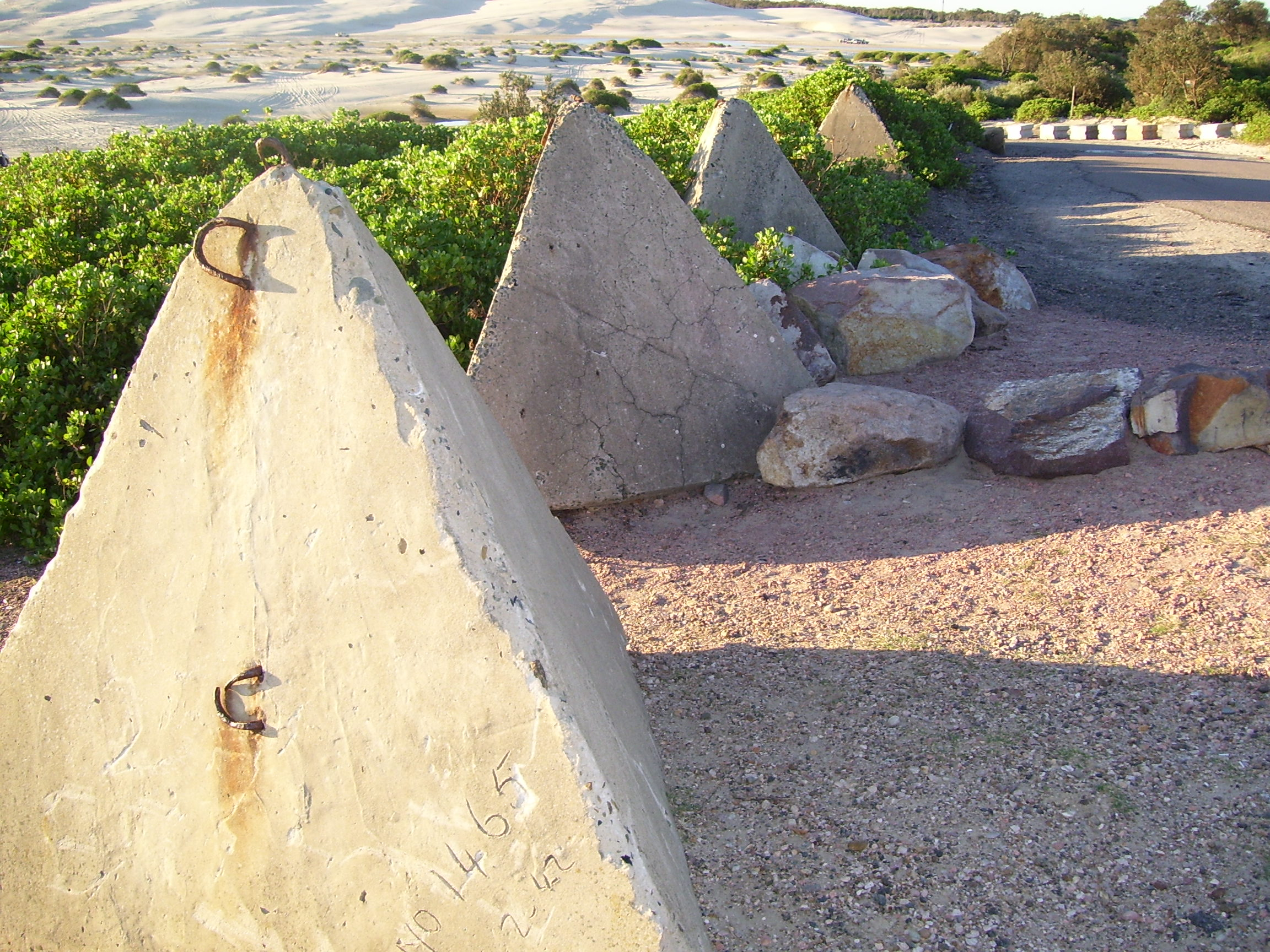
Tank traps along the roadway between the upper and lower car parks at the northern end of Stockton Beach

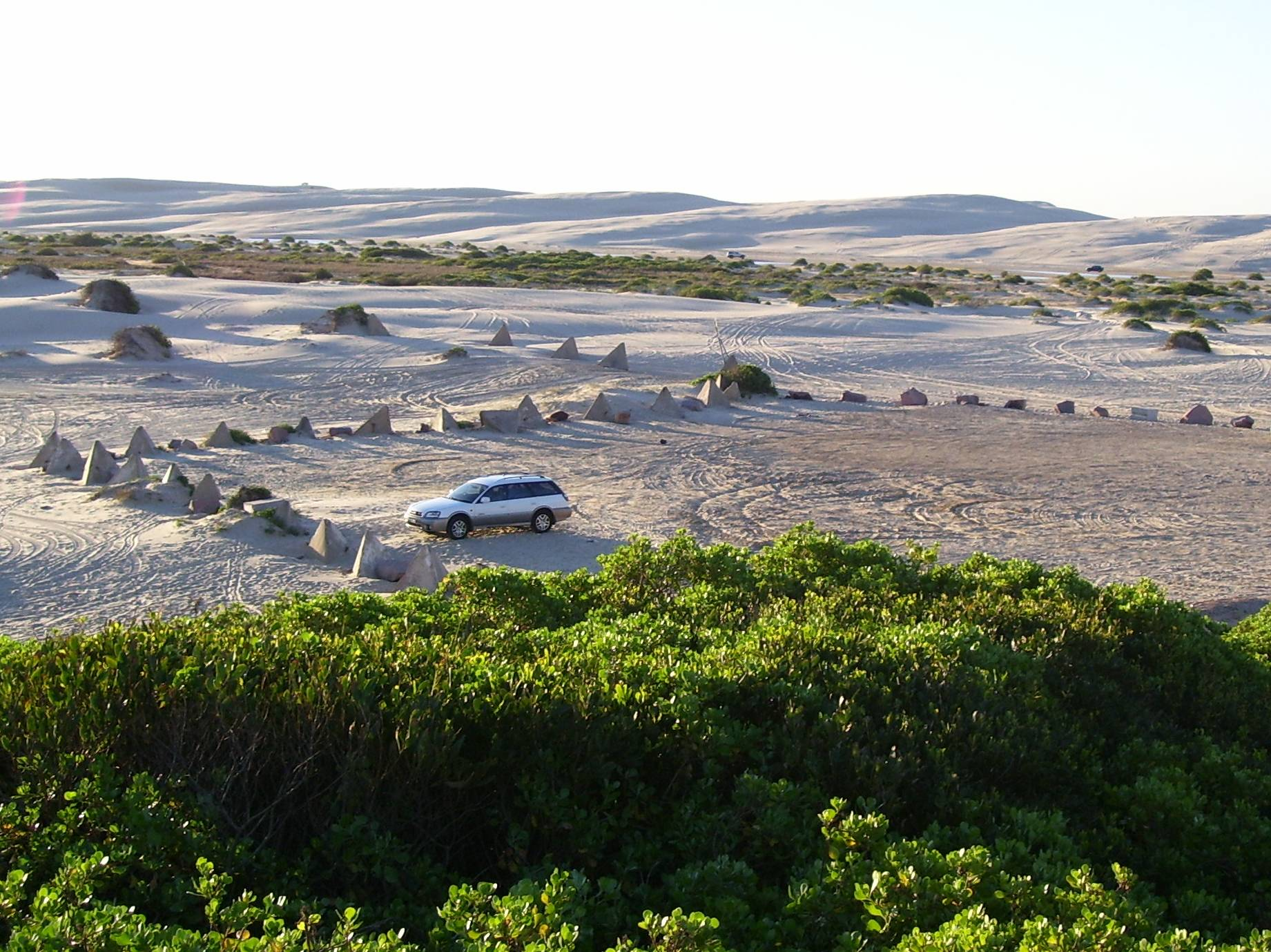
World War II tank traps surrounding lower car park at the northern end of Stockton Beach
