= Boat Harbour, New South Wales =

Boat Harbour New South Wales
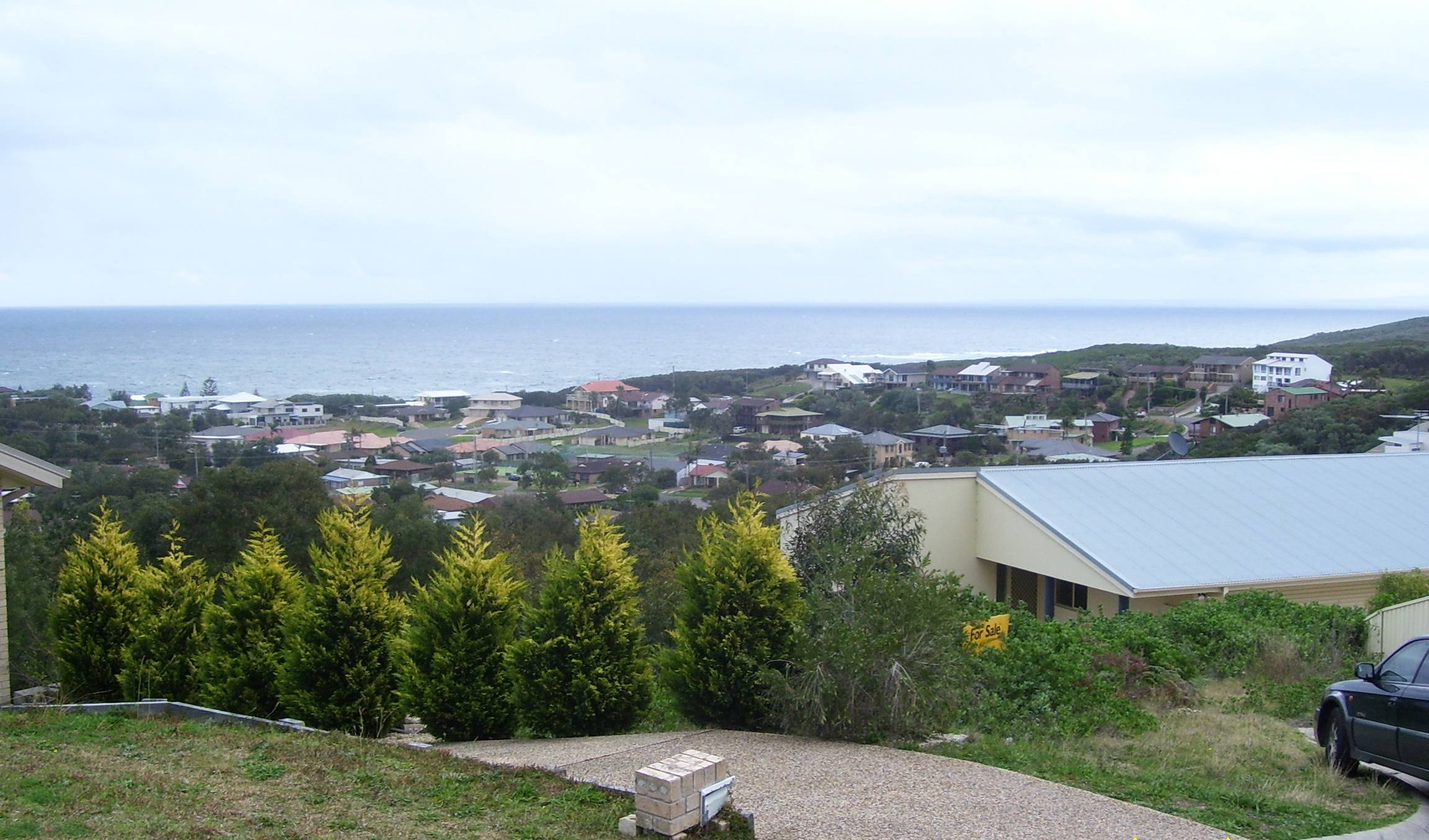
- Boat Harbour looking south-west

- Coordinates: 32°47′03″S 152°06′30″E
- Population: 993 (2021 census)
  - Density: 496.5/km^{2} (1,286/sq mi) (Note: The density presented is that of the whole suburb. However, only about 0.45 square kilometres (0.17 sq mi) of the suburb is residential in nature. The population density of this area is much higher at 1,804/km^{2} (4,670/sq mi).)
- Postcode(s): 2316
- Area: 2 km^{2} (0.8 sq mi) (Note: The area is based on NSW GNB maps and is for the whole suburb. However, most of the suburb is part of Tomaree National Park which consists of unpopulated beaches, coastal reserves and bushland. The actual area occupied by residential development is only about 0.45 km^{2} (0.17 sq mi).)
- Time zone: AEST (UTC+10)
  - Summer (DST): AEDT (UTC+11)
- Location: 204 km (127 mi) NNE of Sydney; 55 km (34 mi) NE of Newcastle; 38 km (24 mi) E of Raymond Terrace
- LGA(s): Port Stephens Council
- Region: Hunter
- County: Gloucester
- Parish: Tomaree
- State electorate(s): Port Stephens
- Federal division(s): Paterson
Mean max temp	Mean min temp	Annual rainfall
27.3 °C; 81 °F	8.4 °C; 47 °F	1,348.9 mm 53.1 in
Suburbs around Boat Harbour:
Anna Bay	One Mile	One Mile, Tasman Sea
Anna Bay, Fishermans Bay	Boat Harbour	Tasman Sea
Tasman Sea	Tasman Sea	Tasman Sea

Boat Harbour is a suburb of the Port Stephens local government area in the Hunter Region of New South Wales, Australia. The main population centre of the suburb is the village also known as Boat Harbour. Both lie adjacent to the bay after which they were named. The traditional owners of the land are Worimi people.

From the easternmost end of Ocean Parade in highest part of the suburb, adjacent to the Tomaree National Park at Morna Point, there are striking views of the coastline. On a clear day it is possible to follow the coast southwards to the horizon, well beyond Newcastle.

Boat Harbour is a sheltered, sandy bay. Kingsley Beach is just to the south and is popular with surfers.
