= Taylors Beach, New South Wales =

Taylors Beach New South Wales
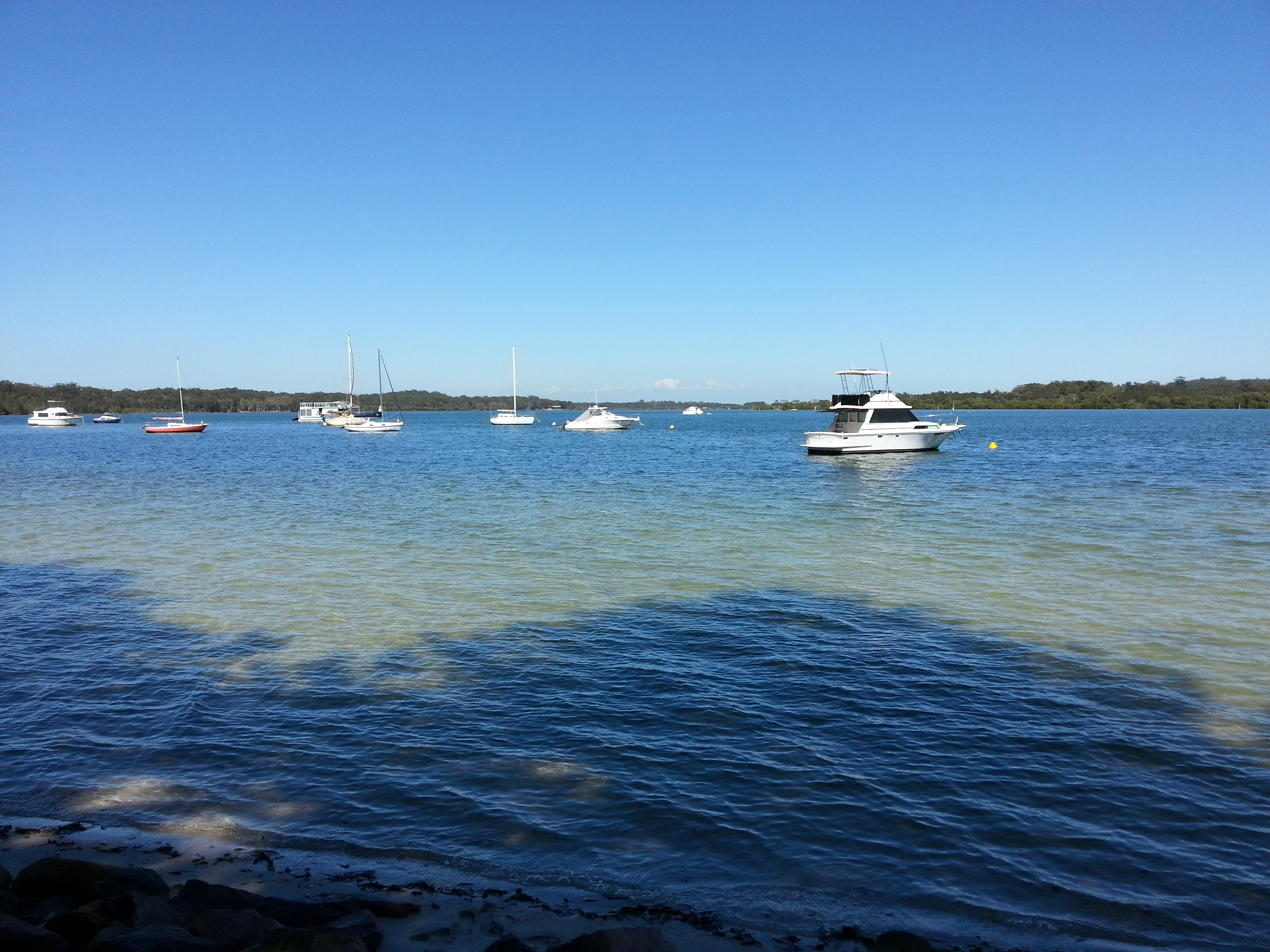
- A picture taken of Taylors Beach from the shoreline

- Coordinates: 32°45′04″S 152°04′04″E
- Population: 120 (2021 census)
  - Density: 22.64/km^{2} (58.6/sq mi)
- Postcode(s): 2316
- Elevation: 3 m (10 ft) (Note: Average elevation of the suburb as shown on 1:100000 map 9332 PORT STEPHENS.)
- Area: 5.3 km^{2} (2.0 sq mi) (Note: Area calculation is based on 1:100000 map 9332 PORT STEPHENS.)
- Time zone: AEST (UTC+10)
  - Summer (DST): AEDT (UTC+11)
- Location: 200 km (124 mi) NNE of Sydney; 53 km (33 mi) NE of Newcastle; 38 km (24 mi) ENE of Raymond Terrace
- LGA(s): Port Stephens Council
- Region: Hunter
- County: Gloucester
- Parish: Tomaree
- State electorate(s): Port Stephens
- Federal division(s): Paterson
Mean max temp	Mean min temp	Annual rainfall
27.3 °C; 81 °F	8.4 °C; 47 °F	1,348.9 mm 53.1 in
Suburbs around Taylors Beach:
Port Stephens	Port Stephens, Salamander Bay	Salamander Bay
Port Stephens, Anna Bay	Taylors Beach	Salamander Bay, Anna Bay
Anna Bay	Anna Bay	Anna Bay

Taylors Beach is a suburb of the Port Stephens local government area in the Hunter Region of New South Wales, Australia. It is largely undeveloped except for some commercial and light industrial developments in the southern part of the suburb. The largest population centre is at Taylors Beach itself, in the western part of the suburb, adjacent to Tilligerry Creek and Port Stephens. At the 2021 census Taylors Beach had a population of 120.

== Infrastructure ==
A large part of the residential area of Taylors Beach is not serviced by Hunter Water. People who live in these areas are dependent on rainwater collection to provide their drinking water. As well as pumping bore water to provide non-drinking water. Sewage disposal is done by either having a pump-out system in which the sewage is collected by a tanker truck or by the use of an absorption trench.

Despite this, all other essential utilities are available to Taylors Beach residents including Electricity, phone and internet access.

== Economy ==
Taylors Beach is home to the Port Stephens Fisheries Institute. Which is responsible for Fisheries Research and Compliance. As well as Aquaculture and Aquatic Bio-security.

The institute employs approximately 85 people and is operated by Department of Primary Industries (New South Wales).

Australia Post has a delivery center in Taylors Beach which provides parcel deliveries to the 2315, 2316 and 2317 postcodes.
