= Port Stephens Council =

- Local government area
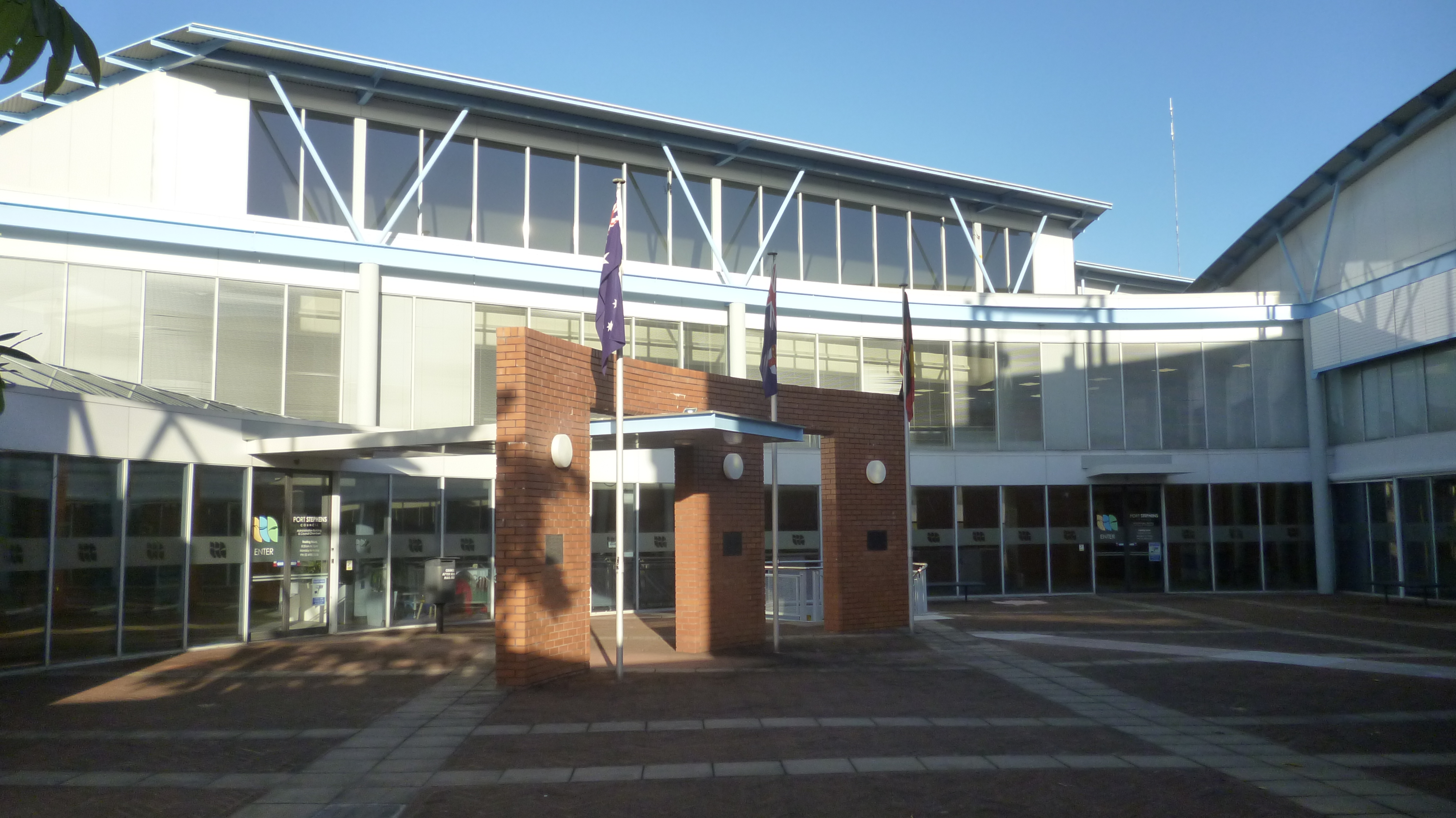
- The Port Stephens Council chambers in Raymond Terrace, the council's centre of government Location in Greater Newcastle

- Interactive map of Port Stephens Council
- Coordinates: 32°45′S 151°55′E
- Country: Australia
- State: New South Wales
- Region: Hunter (Greater Newcastle)
- Location: 168 km (104 mi) NNE of Sydney; 25.8 km (16.0 mi) N of Newcastle; 22 km (14 mi) E of Maitland
- Council seat: Raymond Terrace

Government
  - Mayor: Leah Anderson (Labor)
  - State electorates: Port Stephens; Newcastle
  - Federal division: Paterson

Area
  - Total: 979 km^{2} (378 sq mi)

Population
  - Totals: 75,276 (2021 census); 72,695 (2018 est.)
  - Density: 76.89/km^{2} (199.1/sq mi)
- Time zone: UTC+10 (AEST)
  - Summer (DST): UTC+11 (AEDT)
- Website: Port Stephens Council
LGAs around Port Stephens Council
| Dungog | Dungog & MidCoast | MidCoast |
| Maitland | Port Stephens Council | Tasman Sea |
| Maitland | Newcastle | Tasman Sea |

Port Stephens Council is a local government area in the Hunter Region of New South Wales, Australia. The area is just north of Newcastle and is adjacent to the Pacific Highway which runs through Raymond Terrace, the largest town and Council seat. The area is named after Port Stephens, which is its major geographical feature. It extends generally from the Hunter River in the south, to near Clarence Town in the north, and from the Tasman Sea in the east, to just south of Paterson in the west

== Main towns, villages and suburbs ==
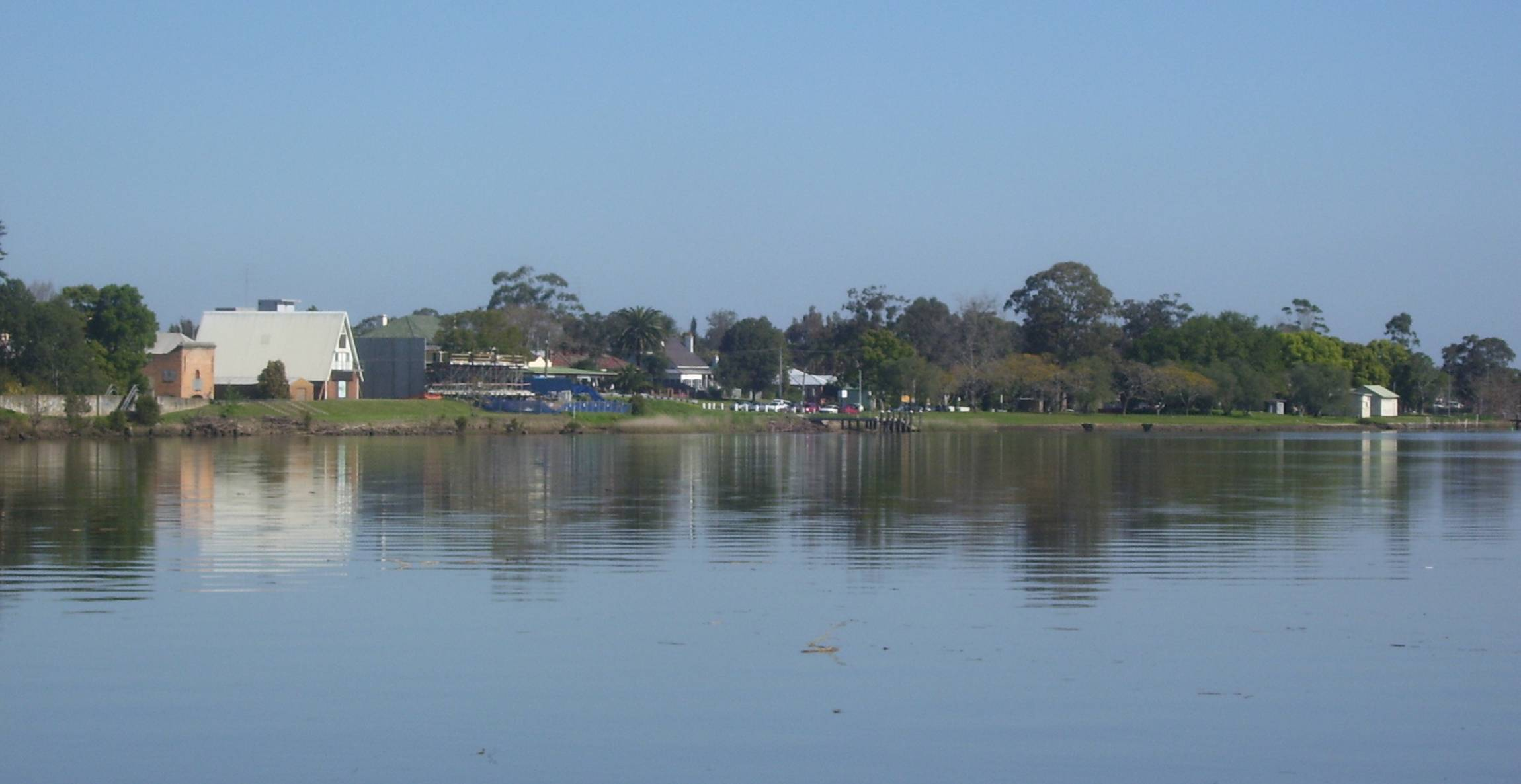
Raymond Terrace, located at the confluence of the Hunter and Williams rivers, is the largest town and administrative centre of Port Stephens Council

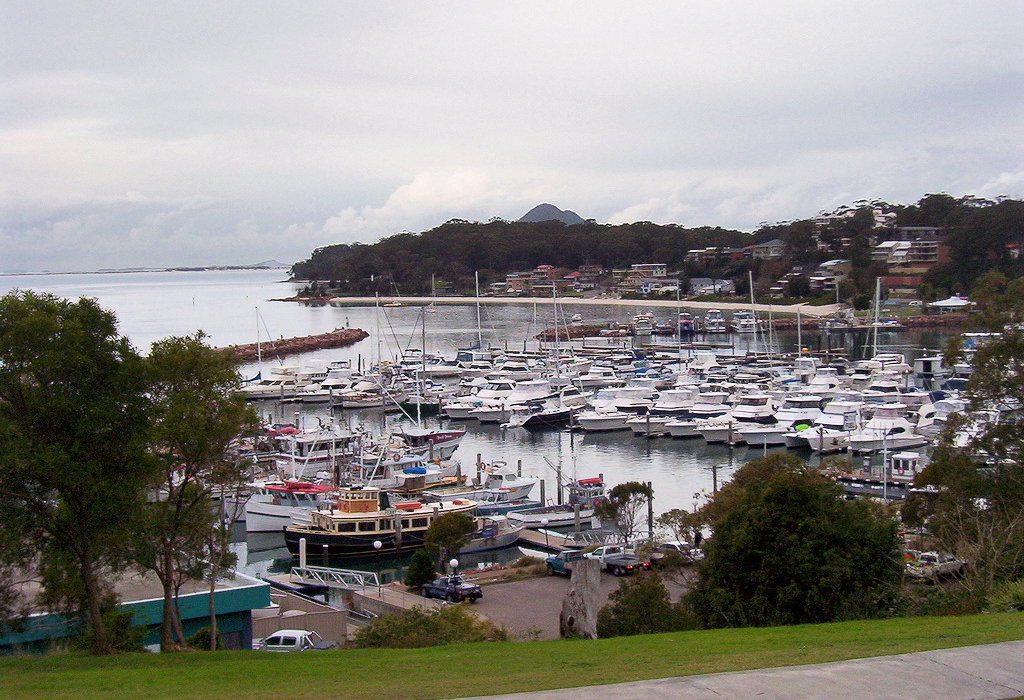
Nelson Bay, a suburb of Port Stephens

Most of the population is concentrated in Raymond Terrace and its satellite suburb of Heatherbrae, or around/near the shores of Port Stephens in the suburbs of Anna Bay, Boat Harbour, Corlette, Fingal Bay, Fishermans Bay, Karuah, Lemon Tree Passage, Mallabula, Nelson Bay, One Mile, Oyster Cove, Salamander Bay, Shoal Bay, Soldiers Point, Swan Bay, Tanilba Bay and Taylors Beach. However, another significant portion of the population lives in a large rural/semi-rural area to the west of the Pacific Highway in the towns and suburbs of Balickera, Butterwick, Duns Creek, Eagleton, East Seaham, Glen Oak, Hinton, Nelsons Plains, Osterley, Seaham, Wallalong and Woodville and in the predominantly residential estate of Brandy Hill.

In the southern part of the area are the rural communities of Bobs Farm, Fern Bay, Fullerton Cove, Salt Ash, Tomago and Williamtown. Tomago supports both rural and industrial communities while Williamtown is the location for a Royal Australian Air Force base that shares its airfield with Newcastle Airport.

At the northern end of the area are Karuah and Twelve Mile Creek. Located adjacent to Port Stephens and straddling the Karuah River, Karuah is predominantly residential. It is the location of the largest Aboriginal community in the area. Twelve Mile Creek is almost exclusively rural.

Centrally located in the area, between Raymond Terrace and Port Stephens are Campvale, Ferodale and Medowie. Ferodale is dominated by Grahamstown Dam, a man-made dam with a capacity of 131,800 megalitres (4,650×10^{6} cu ft) that is a major source of fresh water in the region. The remainder of this area is a mix of rural, semi-rural and residential developments.

A map of the various towns, suburbs and localities within the Port Stephens Council area is available from the Port Stephens Council website.

=== Libraries ===
Port Stephens Libraries are part of the Newcastle Libraries Network, which means they share a collection with Newcastle and Dungog Libraries. Port Stephens has four library branches: Tomaree Library and Community Centre, Raymond Terrace Library, Tilligerry Community Library (an independent library run by volunteers with support from Port Stephens Council), and the Mobile Library. Seed libraries exist at all branches except Tilligerry.

== Demographics ==
At the 2011 census, there were 64,807 people in the Port Stephens local government area, of these 49.2 per cent were male and 50.8 per cent were female. Aboriginal and Torres Strait Islander people made up 3.6 per cent of the population, which was higher than the national and state averages of 2.5 per cent. The median age of people in the Port Stephens Council area was 42 years, which was significantly higher than the national median of 37 years. Children aged 0–14 years made up 19.5 per cent of the population and people aged 65 years and over made up 19.3 per cent of the population. Of people in the area aged 15 years and over, 52.0 per cent were married and 13.5 per cent were either divorced or separated.

Population growth in the Port Stephens Council area between the 2001 census and the 2006 census was 7.10 per cent; and in the subsequent five years to the 2011 census, population growth was 7.15 per cent. When compared with total population growth of Australia for the same periods, being 5.78 per cent and 8.32 per cent respectively, population growth in the Port Stephens local government area was approximately equal to the national average. The median weekly income for residents within the Port Stephens Council area was significantly lower than the national average.

At the 2011 census, the proportion of residents in the Port Stephens local government area who stated their ancestry as Australian or Anglo-Celtic exceeded 81 per cent of all residents (national average was 65.2 per cent). In excess of 63% of all residents in the Port Stephens Council nominated a religious affiliation with Christianity at the 2011 census, which was significantly higher than the national average of 50.2 per cent. Meanwhile, as at the census date, compared to the national average, households in the Port Stephens local government area had a significantly lower than average proportion (4.6 per cent) where two or more languages are spoken (national average was 20.4 per cent); and a significantly higher proportion (92.2 per cent) where English only was spoken at home (national average was 76.8 per cent).

Selected historical census data for the Port Stephens Council local government area
| Census year | | 2001 | 2006 | 2011 | 2016 |
|---|---|---|---|---|---|
| Population | Estimated residents on Census night | 56,474 | 60,484 | 64,807 | 69,556 |
| Population | LGA rank in terms of size within New South Wales | | | | 36th |
| Population | % of New South Wales population | | | 0.94% | ▼0.93% |
| Population | % of Australian population | 0.30% | 0.30% | 0.30% | 0.30% |
| Cultural and language diversity | | | | | |
| Ancestry, top responses | Australian | | | 33.3% | ▼32.0% |
| Ancestry, top responses | English | | | 32.5% | ▼32.0% |
| Ancestry, top responses | Irish | | | 8.0% | ▲8.2% |
| Ancestry, top responses | Scottish | | | 7.5% | ▲7.7% |
| Ancestry, top responses | German | | | 3.1% | ▼3.0% |
| Language, top responses (other than English) | Italian | 0.2% | ▲0.3% | 0.3% | ▼0.2% |
| Language, top responses (other than English) | Spanish | n/c | n/c | n/c | ▲0.2% |
| Language, top responses (other than English) | German | 0.3% | ▼0.2% | 0.2% | 0.2% |
| Language, top responses (other than English) | Greek | 0.2% | 0.2% | 0.2% | 0.2% |
| Language, top responses (other than English) | French | n/c | ▲0.1% | 0.1% | ▲0.2% |
| Religious affiliation | | | | | |
| Religious affiliation, top responses | No Religion | 11.9% | ▲14.9% | ▲18.7% | ▲25.9% |
| Religious affiliation, top responses | Anglican | 32.5% | ▼31.3% | ▼29.4% | ▼24.9% |
| Religious affiliation, top responses | Catholic | 24.2% | ▼23.5% | ▼23.3% | ▼21.7% |
| Religious affiliation, top responses | Uniting Church | 8.0% | ▼7.2% | ▼6.4% | ▼4.9% |
| Religious affiliation, top responses | Presbyterian and Reformed | 4.5% | ▼4.1% | ▼3.9% | ▼ n/c |
| Median weekly incomes | | | | | |
| Personal income | Median weekly personal income | | A$388 | A$498 | A$571 |
| Personal income | % of Australian median income | | 83.3% | ▲86.3% | 86.3% |
| Family income | Median weekly family income | | A$1,029 | A$1,245 | A$1,431 |
| Family income | % of Australian median income | | 87.9% | ▼84.1% | ▼82.5% |
| Household income | Median weekly household income | | A$830 | A$999 | A$1,180 |
| Household income | % of Australian median income | | 80.8% | ▲81.0% | ▲82.1% |

== Council ==
=== Current composition and election method ===
Port Stephens Council is composed of ten councillors, including the mayor, for a fixed four-year term of office. The Mayor is directly elected while the nine other Councillors are elected proportionally as three separate wards, each electing three Councillors. The most recent election was held on 14 September 2024, and the makeup of the Council, including the mayor, is as follows:

| Party | Councillors |
|---|---|
| Labor | 5 |
| Independent | 3 |
| Liberal | 1 |
| Independent National | 1 |
| Total | 10 |

The current Council, elected in 2024, in order of election by ward, is:

| Ward | Councillor | Party |
|---|---|---|
| Mayor | Leah Anderson | Labor |
| East Ward | Nathan Errington | Liberal |
| East Ward | Roz Armstrong | Labor |
| East Ward | Mark Watson | Independent |
| Central Ward | Chris Doohan | Independent |
| Central Ward | Jason Wells | Labor |
| Central Ward | Ben Niland | Independent National |
| West Ward | Paul Le Mottee | Independent |
| West Ward | Giacomo Arnott | Labor |
| West Ward | Peter Francis | Labor |

== Election results ==
=== 2024 ===
2024 New South Wales local elections: Port Stephens
| Party | Votes | % | Swing | Seats | Change |
|---|---|---|---|---|---|
| Labor | 19,936 | 42.64% | +1.04% | 4 | - |
| Liberal | 4,534 | 9.70% | +0.60% | 1 | - |
| Greens | 1,234 | 2.64% | –0.76% | 0 | - |
| Save Port Stephens | 5,159 | 11.03% | +11.03% | 1 | +1 |
| Independents | 15,896 | 34.00% | –11.90% | 3 | –1 |
| Formal votes | 46,759 | 91.54% | | | |
| Informal votes | 4,322 | 8.46% | | | |
| Turnout | 51,081 | | | | |

=== 2021 ===
2021 New South Wales local elections: Port Stephens
| Party | Votes | % | Swing | Seats | Change |
|---|---|---|---|---|---|
| Independent | 21,335 | 45.9 | −36.7 | 4 | |
| Labor | 19,372 | 41.6 | +24.2 | 4 | ▲3 |
| Liberal | 4,255 | 9.1 | +3.6 (Note: Compared with the Independent Liberal result at the 2017 election.) | 1 | ▲1 |
| Greens | 1,565 | 3.4 | +3.4 | 0 | Steady |
| Formal votes | 46,527 | 93.8 | | | |
| Informal votes | 3,073 | 6.2 | | | |
| Turnout | 49,600 | 86.1 | | | |

== Past councillors ==
=== 2017−present ===
==== Central Ward ====
| Year | Councillor | Party | Councillor | Party | Councillor | Party |
|---|---|---|---|---|---|---|
| 2017 | Chris Doohan | Independent | Geoff Dingle | Independent | Steve Tucker | Independent |
| 2021 | Chris Doohan | Independent | Jason Wells | Labor | Steve Tucker | Independent |

==== East Ward ====
| Year | Councillor | Party | Councillor | Party | Councillor | Party |
|---|---|---|---|---|---|---|
| 2017 | John Nell | Independent | Sally Dover | Independent | John Morello | Independent |
| 2021 | Leah Anderson | Labor | Matthew Bailey | Liberal | Glen Dunkley | Independent |

==== West Ward ====
| Year | Councillor | Party | Councillor | Party | Councillor | Party |
|---|---|---|---|---|---|---|
| 2017 | Ken Jordan | Independent Liberal | Paul Le Mottee | Independent Liberal | Peter Kafer | Independent |
| 2021 | Giacomo Arnott | Labor | Peter Francis | Labor | Peter Kafer | Independent |

== Proposed merger with Newcastle ==
A 2015 review of local government boundaries by the NSW Government Independent Pricing and Regulatory Tribunal recommended the merger of a number of adjoining councils. In the initial proposal, Port Stephens Council was not included in any amalgamation proposals. However, after Lake Macquarie City Council successfully avoided a proposed merger between it and Newcastle City Council, the Minister for Local Government subsequently proposed that Newcastle City Council instead merge with Port Stephens Council to form a new council with an area of 1,045 km^{2} (403 sq mi) and support a population of approximately 230,000.

The proposed merger was met with significant opposition. Thousands of residents attended rallies and signed petitions opposed to the proposal, while 470 attended public inquiry meetings. The state member for Port Stephens, Kate Washington, former state member Craig Baumann and broadcaster Alan Jones all publicly expressed their opposition. Federal Liberal member for Paterson, Bob Baldwin, spoke in parliament, urging the Liberal Baird government to reconsider the proposal, claiming "this proposal seems to defy logic". Port Stephens Council claimed that 93% of residents surveyed were opposed to the merger and included the results of its community survey in its submission to the delegate responsible for evaluating the merger. In response to the government's proposal, Port Stephens Council formally asked the government to evaluate a merger between Port Stephens and Dungog Shire. Although the mayor of Dungog Shire opposed the merger, it was reported that the proposal had community support within both local government areas. The proposal was debated in the New South Wales parliament on 23 March 2016, with the Minister for Local Government confirming that the proposal had been referred to the Office of Local Government.

On 14 February 2017, the NSW government announced it would not be proceeding with further regional council mergers, including the Newcastle City Council and Port Stephens Council merger.

== Transport ==
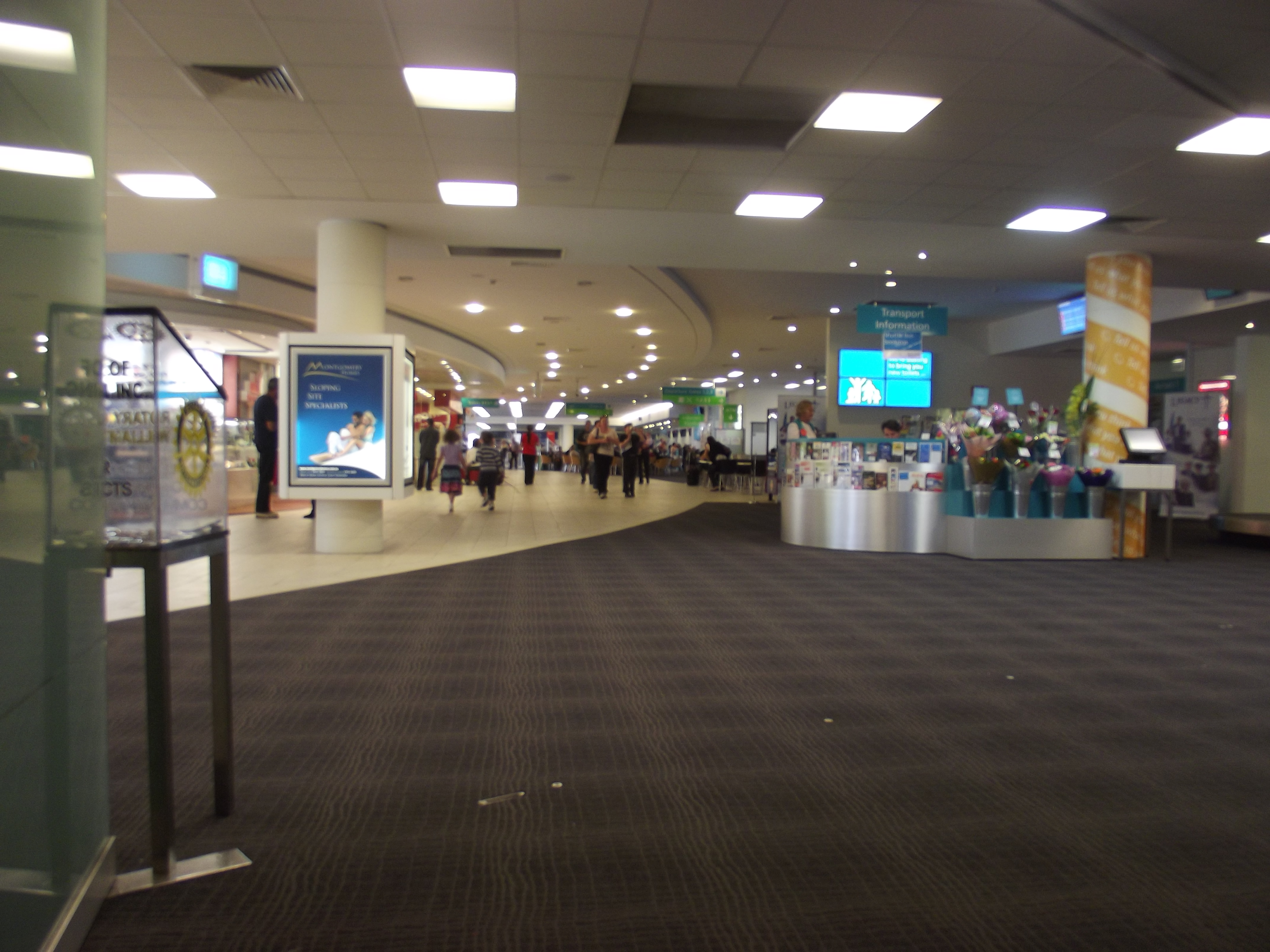
Interior of Newcastle Airport terminal building in 2011

Port Stephens Coaches operates bus services in Port Stephens. It also operates services to Newcastle Interchange and between Newcastle and Newcastle Airport. Port Stephens Coaches also runs a daily coach service to Sydney, terminating at Central railway station.

Newcastle Airport is located in Williamtown. It has direct flights to Brisbane, Melbourne, Ballina, Canberra, Dubbo, Gold Coast, Sydney and Taree. It is served by Virgin Australia, QantasLink, FlyPelican and Jetstar.

Newcastle Interchange is the nearest major railway station to Port Stephens. Sydney Trains operates services from here to Sydney, Maitland, Telarah, Dungog, Muswellbrook and Scone. The station is served by Central Coast & Newcastle Line and Hunter Line services.

Port Stephens Ferry Service provides a ferry link between Nelson Bay and Tea Gardens.

== Climate ==
Port Stephens Council covers an area of 979 square kilometres (378 sq mi), stretching approximately 57 kilometres (35 mi) from east to west and approximately 30 km (19 mi) from north to south, and experiences various climatic conditions throughout the LGA. These are monitored by five weather stations, four of which are located at the approximate cardinal points of the area, operated by the Bureau of Meteorology. The fifth station is located on RAAF Base Williamtown. The following tables indicate average climatic data throughout the area.

=== Eastern ===
Climate data for Nelson Head, Nelson Bay
| Month | Jan | Feb | Mar | Apr | May | Jun | Jul | Aug | Sep | Oct | Nov | Dec | Year |
|---|---|---|---|---|---|---|---|---|---|---|---|---|---|
| Record high °C (°F) | 36.5 (97.7) | 41.5 (106.7) | 36.0 (96.8) | 30.5 (86.9) | 26.7 (80.1) | 24.0 (75.2) | 24.4 (75.9) | 27.4 (81.3) | 34.2 (93.6) | 33.9 (93.0) | 40.6 (105.1) | 39.3 (102.7) | 41.5 (106.7) |
| Mean daily maximum °C (°F) | 27.3 (81.1) | 27.1 (80.8) | 25.9 (78.6) | 23.7 (74.7) | 20.8 (69.4) | 18.4 (65.1) | 17.5 (63.5) | 18.9 (66.0) | 21.4 (70.5) | 23.3 (73.9) | 24.8 (76.6) | 26.3 (79.3) | 23.0 (73.3) |
| Mean daily minimum °C (°F) | 18.2 (64.8) | 18.4 (65.1) | 17.0 (62.6) | 14.6 (58.3) | 11.7 (53.1) | 9.4 (48.9) | 8.4 (47.1) | 9.3 (48.7) | 11.2 (52.2) | 13.5 (56.3) | 15.2 (59.4) | 17.1 (62.8) | 13.7 (56.6) |
| Record low °C (°F) | 11.0 (51.8) | 14.5 (58.1) | 11.5 (52.7) | 9.0 (48.2) | 6.1 (43.0) | 4.4 (39.9) | 2.2 (36.0) | 1.1 (34.0) | 5.0 (41.0) | 8.5 (47.3) | 6.7 (44.1) | 9.0 (48.2) | 1.1 (34.0) |
| Average rainfall mm (inches) | 100.8 (3.97) | 111.3 (4.38) | 119.2 (4.69) | 126.7 (4.99) | 152.2 (5.99) | 153.1 (6.03) | 141.1 (5.56) | 105.5 (4.15) | 88.8 (3.50) | 78.3 (3.08) | 78.8 (3.10) | 95.0 (3.74) | 1,350.8 (53.18) |

=== North ===
Climate data for Wallaroo State Forest, Twelve Mile Creek
| Month | Jan | Feb | Mar | Apr | May | Jun | Jul | Aug | Sep | Oct | Nov | Dec | Year |
|---|---|---|---|---|---|---|---|---|---|---|---|---|---|
| Mean daily maximum °C (°F) | 28.3 (82.9) | 27.8 (82.0) | 26.5 (79.7) | 23.0 (73.4) | 19.8 (67.6) | 17.1 (62.8) | 16.4 (61.5) | 18.0 (64.4) | 21.2 (70.2) | 23.7 (74.7) | 26.2 (79.2) | 28.0 (82.4) | 23.0 (73.4) |
| Mean daily minimum °C (°F) | 16.3 (61.3) | 16.4 (61.5) | 14.8 (58.6) | 11.0 (51.8) | 7.4 (45.3) | 5.8 (42.4) | 3.6 (38.5) | 4.8 (40.6) | 6.7 (44.1) | 10.2 (50.4) | 12.4 (54.3) | 14.6 (58.3) | 10.3 (50.6) |
| Average rainfall mm (inches) | 124.8 (4.91) | 121.7 (4.79) | 142.6 (5.61) | 100.0 (3.94) | 99.7 (3.93) | 118.7 (4.67) | 63.4 (2.50) | 68.1 (2.68) | 58.2 (2.29) | 79.7 (3.14) | 83.0 (3.27) | 90.6 (3.57) | 1,150.5 (45.3) |

=== South-central ===
Climate data for RAAF Base Williamtown
| Month | Jan | Feb | Mar | Apr | May | Jun | Jul | Aug | Sep | Oct | Nov | Dec | Year |
|---|---|---|---|---|---|---|---|---|---|---|---|---|---|
| Record high °C (°F) | 44.4 (111.9) | 42.8 (109.0) | 40.7 (105.3) | 37.0 (98.6) | 29.6 (85.3) | 26.6 (79.9) | 27.8 (82.0) | 30.1 (86.2) | 36.0 (96.8) | 39.4 (102.9) | 43.2 (109.8) | 42.8 (109.0) | 44.4 (111.9) |
| Mean daily maximum °C (°F) | 27.9 (82.2) | 27.5 (81.5) | 26.2 (79.2) | 23.7 (74.7) | 20.2 (68.4) | 17.6 (63.7) | 17.0 (62.6) | 18.6 (65.5) | 21.2 (70.2) | 23.6 (74.5) | 25.4 (77.7) | 27.2 (81.0) | 23.0 (73.4) |
| Mean daily minimum °C (°F) | 18.0 (64.4) | 18.1 (64.6) | 16.3 (61.3) | 13.2 (55.8) | 10.1 (50.2) | 7.8 (46.0) | 6.4 (43.5) | 6.9 (44.4) | 9.0 (48.2) | 12.0 (53.6) | 14.2 (57.6) | 16.5 (61.7) | 12.4 (54.3) |
| Record low °C (°F) | 9.4 (48.9) | 9.6 (49.3) | 8.6 (47.5) | 2.1 (35.8) | −0.6 (30.9) | 0.0 (32.0) | −3.9 (25.0) | −1.9 (28.6) | 0.4 (32.7) | 3.0 (37.4) | 5.1 (41.2) | 7.9 (46.2) | −3.9 (25.0) |
| Average rainfall mm (inches) | 99.9 (3.93) | 121.4 (4.78) | 121.7 (4.79) | 104.2 (4.10) | 115.0 (4.53) | 121.0 (4.76) | 71.6 (2.82) | 78.1 (3.07) | 59.4 (2.34) | 74.5 (2.93) | 80.9 (3.19) | 80.0 (3.15) | 1,127.7 (44.39) |

=== Western ===
Climate data for Tocal Automatic Weather Station (AWS), Tocal
| Month | Jan | Feb | Mar | Apr | May | Jun | Jul | Aug | Sep | Oct | Nov | Dec | Year |
|---|---|---|---|---|---|---|---|---|---|---|---|---|---|
| Record high °C (°F) | 43.7 (110.7) | 44.6 (112.3) | 41.2 (106.2) | 37.3 (99.1) | 29.5 (85.1) | 26.1 (79.0) | 27.3 (81.1) | 30.4 (86.7) | 36.2 (97.2) | 40.1 (104.2) | 42.5 (108.5) | 44.2 (111.6) | 44.6 (112.3) |
| Mean daily maximum °C (°F) | 29.6 (85.3) | 28.8 (83.8) | 26.9 (80.4) | 24.3 (75.7) | 20.7 (69.3) | 17.7 (63.9) | 17.3 (63.1) | 19.3 (66.7) | 22.2 (72.0) | 24.9 (76.8) | 26.6 (79.9) | 29.1 (84.4) | 24.0 (75.1) |
| Mean daily minimum °C (°F) | 17.5 (63.5) | 17.5 (63.5) | 15.6 (60.1) | 12.4 (54.3) | 9.7 (49.5) | 7.4 (45.3) | 6.1 (43.0) | 6.6 (43.9) | 8.8 (47.8) | 11.4 (52.5) | 13.8 (56.8) | 16.2 (61.2) | 11.9 (53.5) |
| Record low °C (°F) | 8.6 (47.5) | 9.4 (48.9) | 8.0 (46.4) | 1.3 (34.3) | 0.5 (32.9) | 0.2 (32.4) | −4.7 (23.5) | −1.5 (29.3) | −0.6 (30.9) | 3.4 (38.1) | 5.3 (41.5) | 6.2 (43.2) | −4.7 (23.5) |
| Average rainfall mm (inches) | 108.5 (4.27) | 116.3 (4.58) | 118.1 (4.65) | 76.4 (3.01) | 76.8 (3.02) | 71.1 (2.80) | 39.3 (1.55) | 37.9 (1.49) | 47.8 (1.88) | 67.3 (2.65) | 81.5 (3.21) | 78.2 (3.08) | 919.2 (36.19) |

=== Southern ===
Climate data for Nobbys Signal Station AWS, Newcastle
| Month | Jan | Feb | Mar | Apr | May | Jun | Jul | Aug | Sep | Oct | Nov | Dec | Year |
|---|---|---|---|---|---|---|---|---|---|---|---|---|---|
| Record high °C (°F) | 41.4 (106.5) | 40.9 (105.6) | 39.0 (102.2) | 36.8 (98.2) | 28.5 (83.3) | 26.1 (79.0) | 26.3 (79.3) | 29.9 (85.8) | 34.4 (93.9) | 36.7 (98.1) | 41.0 (105.8) | 42.0 (107.6) | 42.0 (107.6) |
| Mean daily maximum °C (°F) | 25.5 (77.9) | 25.4 (77.7) | 24.7 (76.5) | 22.8 (73.0) | 20.0 (68.0) | 17.5 (63.5) | 16.7 (62.1) | 18.0 (64.4) | 20.2 (68.4) | 22.1 (71.8) | 23.5 (74.3) | 24.9 (76.8) | 21.8 (71.2) |
| Mean daily minimum °C (°F) | 19.2 (66.6) | 19.3 (66.7) | 18.2 (64.8) | 15.3 (59.5) | 12.0 (53.6) | 9.6 (49.3) | 8.4 (47.1) | 9.2 (48.6) | 11.4 (52.5) | 14.0 (57.2) | 16.1 (61.0) | 18.0 (64.4) | 14.2 (57.6) |
| Record low °C (°F) | 12.0 (53.6) | 10.3 (50.5) | 11.1 (52.0) | 7.4 (45.3) | 4.7 (40.5) | 3.0 (37.4) | 1.8 (35.2) | 3.3 (37.9) | 5.0 (41.0) | 6.5 (43.7) | 7.2 (45.0) | 11.0 (51.8) | 1.8 (35.2) |
| Average rainfall mm (inches) | 89.5 (3.52) | 108.0 (4.25) | 120.8 (4.76) | 116.6 (4.59) | 118.0 (4.65) | 117.5 (4.63) | 95.0 (3.74) | 75.1 (2.96) | 73.0 (2.87) | 73.2 (2.88) | 70.5 (2.78) | 81.8 (3.22) | 1,139 (44.85) |

== Climate action ==
In 2020, Port Stephens Council adopted a climate change policy and joined the Cities Power Partnership. The policy recognised that climate in Australia is continuing to change and ongoing action is needed to ensure a sustainable future.

Council’s climate action plan has three main focus areas: Education; Mitigation; and Adaptation. Council committed to responding to the challenges of climate change in the following ways:

1. Consulting widely with local residents and businesses to raise awareness of climate change risks and strategies for effective climate change management, mitigation, and adaptation.
2. Seeking feedback and ideas from the community on how to better manage, mitigate and build community resilience to climate change risks.
3. Preparing and implementing a sustainability strategy and action plan to clearly communicate its sustainability actions, targets and performance indicators.
4. Reducing contributions to climate change by implementing a range of sustainability projects.
5. Reviewing and maintaining a Climate Change Adaptation Action Plan.
6. Regularly publishing its progress and achievements in managing climate change risks in alignment with the Integrated Planning and Reporting framework.
7. Investigating and sourcing funding opportunities to support Council’s climate change mitigation and adaptation projects.

In 2021, Council passed a motion that committed to achieving carbon neutrality for its operations by 2025. GHG emission reduction achievements to date include installing in several council buildings: solar voltaic systems; LED lighting and; programmable logic controllers to deliver energy efficiencies and reduce costs. In a first for the region, recycled glass 'greencrete' was used in the upgrade of the Tanilba Bay roundabout.

Council has recently commenced a baseline study of its current GHG emissions, and is expected to commence work on a ‘roadmap’ for carbon neutrality, a renewable energy target later in 2022. However, Council has not adopted a climate emergency declaration and does not have a detailed Climate Change Adaptation Action Plan which encompasses community-wide emissions, as committed in its overall 2020 climate change policy.

Founded in 2019, Climate Action Port Stephens (CAPS) is a not-for-profit community group of Port Stephens residents who are concerned about global climate change and ecological crises and want real climate action in the community. CAPS petitioned Council in 2019 and in 2020 to declare a climate emergency. CAPS is one of over 30 community groups, businesses and individuals who have joined EcoNetwork Port Stephens which was founded in 1993 as a not-for-profit, apolitical and 100% volunteer-run organisation acting as a significant voice for nature conservation and the environment.

== Sister cities ==
Port Stephens has sister city relationships with the following cities:

- Bellingham, Washington, United States (since 1982)
- Kushiro, Hokkaidō, Japan (since 1994)
- Tateyama, Chiba, Japan (Friendship Cities from 1999–2009, sister cities since 2009)
- Yugawara, Kanagawa, Japan (Since 1999)
