= Grahamstown (disambiguation) =

Grahamstown is a city in South Africa.

Grahamstown may also refer to:

- The National Arts Festival, also known as the Grahamstown Festival, held annually in Grahamstown in South Africa
- Grahamstown, New South Wales, a small village near Tumblong in Australia
- Grahamstown, one of the two historic town centres that now form Thames, New Zealand
- Grahamstown, a former name of the Whangārei, New Zealand, suburb now known as Onerahi
- Grahamstown, a Subdivision (land) in the town of Raymond Terrace, Australia
  - Grahamstown Dam, an artificial lake providing drinking water to towns in the Hunter and Central coast regions of New South Wales, Australia
