= Williamtown, New South Wales =

Williamtown
- Suburb
- Fighter World Museum at RAAF Base Williamtown

- Interactive map of Williamtown
- Coordinates: 32°48′54″S 151°50′34″E
- Country: Australia
- State: New South Wales
- Region: Hunter
- City: Newcastle
- LGA: Port Stephens Council
- Location: 173 km (107 mi) NNE of Sydney; 26 km (16 mi) N of Newcastle; 15 km (9.3 mi) ESE of Raymond Terrace

Government
  - State electorate: Port Stephens
  - Federal division: Paterson

Area (Note: Area calculation is based on 1:100000 map 9232 NEWCASTLE.)
  - Total: 44.9 km^{2} (17.3 sq mi)
- Elevation (Note: Average elevation of the suburb as shown on 1:100000 map 9232 NEWCASTLE.): 5 m (16 ft)

Population
  - Total: 762 (2021 census)
  - Density: 16.97/km^{2} (44.0/sq mi)
- Time zone: UTC+10 (AEST)
  - Summer (DST): UTC+11 (AEDT)
- Postcodes: 2318 (Williamtown), 2314 (Williamtown RAAF)
- County: Gloucester
- Parish: Stowell
- Mean max temp: 23.2 °C (73.8 °F)
- Mean min temp: 12.5 °C (54.5 °F)
- Annual rainfall: 1,129.0 mm (44.45 in)
Suburbs around Williamtown
Raymond Terrace	Campvale	Salt Ash
Raymond Terrace, Tomago	Williamtown	Salt Ash
Tomago	Fullerton Cove	Salt Ash, Tasman Sea

Williamtown is a rural suburb of the Port Stephens local government area in the Hunter Region of New South Wales, Australia. It is located on the main road between Newcastle and Nelson Bay.

The suburb is home to the RAAF Base Williamtown, which was established on 15 February 1941.

== Geography ==
The eastern section of Williamtown is dominated by RAAF Base Williamtown and Newcastle Airport while the western section of the area is primarily semi-rural with some large-acreage residential areas scattered along Cabbage Tree Road which is a main access route to Port Stephens from the Pacific Highway. To the south Williamtown reaches Fullerton Cove, a large cove at the Hunter River. The south-eastern corner of the area reaches the Tasman Sea on Stockton Beach and access to the beach is possible at this point for off-road vehicles via Lavis Lane.

With many low-lying areas, and some swamps, flooding was not unknown; and attempts to drain the Moors was made.

== History ==
The area was home to the Worimi First Nations group, whose past presence is noted by canoe trees, ceremonial sites, and middens. A 1790 shipwreck saw five convicts escape, and live with the Worimi for five years.

Early European pioneers arriving in the 1840s had to clear the heavily timbered lands so the grounds could be used for food cultivation. Weaving cabbage-tree hats, the tree being plentiful in the area, was an early activity. Dairy such as milk was transported to Newcastle for sale, and developments such as the milk separator for producing butter were a welcome improvement.

A Wesleyan Church was built by July 1863 at Williamtown.

The first public school was opened in February 1869, with a larger facility opened nearby in 1925. Due to population changes, the school was closed in 2008.

The dairy and vegetable-producing industries were considered the best in the area by 1924, unaffected by droughts. At this time, there were schools, shops, and churches, but no public hotels.

Consideration of the first aerodromes was mooted in July 1928. In late 1939 the Defence Department considered a 1,200 yards (1,100 m) military runway on 270 acres (110 ha) of Crown land.

Williamtown is also the base of the Worimi Local Aboriginal Land Council, which lists its office on Nelson Bay Road in the suburb.

== Population ==
In the 2016 Census, there were 885 people in Williamtown. 70.9% of people were born in Australia and 80.7% of people spoke only English at home. The most common responses for religion was Anglican at 22.8%.

== Tomago sandbeds ==
Most of Williamtown sits atop the Tomago sandbeds (an aquifer that is a critical source of water for the lower Hunter Region). The sandbeds are replenished primarily by rain as well as any water that leaks from Grahamstown Dam in nearby Ferodale. Water from the sandbeds and the dam is treated in Tomago.

== Climate ==
Williamtown possesses a humid subtropical climate (Köppen: Cfa), with very warm, wet summers and mild, relatively dry winters. Average maxima vary from 28.3 °C (82.9 °F) in January to 17.2 °C (63.0 °F) in July, while average minima fluctuate between 18.2 °C (64.8 °F) in January and February and 6.5 °C (43.7 °F) in July. Annual precipitation is moderately high (averaging 1,129.0 mm (44.45 in)), and is spread across 86.6 precipitation days (over 1.0 mm (0.039 in)). The town experiences 103.2 clear days and 127.3 cloudy days per annum. Extreme temperatures have ranged from 45.5 °C (113.9 °F) on 4 January 2020 and 11 February 2017 to −3.9 °C (25.0 °F) on 18 July 1970.

Climate data for Williamtown RAAF (32.79°S 151.84°E, 8 m AMSL) (1942–2024 normals & extremes)
Month	Jan	Feb	Mar	Apr	May	Jun	Jul	Aug	Sep	Oct	Nov	Dec	Year
Record high °C (°F)	45.5 (113.9)	45.5 (113.9)	40.7 (105.3)	37.0 (98.6)	29.6 (85.3)	26.6 (79.9)	27.8 (82.0)	30.5 (86.9)	36.4 (97.5)	39.4 (102.9)	43.2 (109.8)	43.7 (110.7)	45.5 (113.9)
Mean daily maximum °C (°F)	28.3 (82.9)	27.7 (81.9)	26.4 (79.5)	23.8 (74.8)	20.4 (68.7)	17.7 (63.9)	17.2 (63.0)	18.8 (65.8)	21.5 (70.7)	23.8 (74.8)	25.6 (78.1)	27.4 (81.3)	23.2 (73.8)
Mean daily minimum °C (°F)	18.2 (64.8)	18.2 (64.8)	16.5 (61.7)	13.3 (55.9)	10.1 (50.2)	8.0 (46.4)	6.5 (43.7)	6.9 (44.4)	9.2 (48.6)	12.0 (53.6)	14.5 (58.1)	16.6 (61.9)	12.5 (54.5)
Record low °C (°F)	9.4 (48.9)	9.6 (49.3)	8.6 (47.5)	2.1 (35.8)	−0.6 (30.9)	−1.8 (28.8)	−3.9 (25.0)	−1.9 (28.6)	0.4 (32.7)	3.0 (37.4)	5.1 (41.2)	7.9 (46.2)	−3.9 (25.0)
Average precipitation mm (inches)	98.4 (3.87)	118.7 (4.67)	126.9 (5.00)	110.7 (4.36)	110.8 (4.36)	122.1 (4.81)	75.4 (2.97)	71.5 (2.81)	60.1 (2.37)	75.9 (2.99)	82.7 (3.26)	76.8 (3.02)	1,129 (44.45)
Average precipitation days (≥ 1.0 mm)	7.2	7.5	8.5	7.6	7.7	8.3	6.5	6.1	5.7	7.3	7.2	7.0	86.6
Average afternoon relative humidity (%)	59	62	61	59	60	60	55	50	50	54	55	56	57
Average dew point °C (°F)	17.0 (62.6)	17.6 (63.7)	16.2 (61.2)	13.3 (55.9)	10.6 (51.1)	8.4 (47.1)	6.3 (43.3)	6.2 (43.2)	8.2 (46.8)	10.8 (51.4)	13.1 (55.6)	15.2 (59.4)	11.9 (53.4)
Mean monthly sunshine hours	229.4	203.4	217.0	207.0	189.1	168.0	198.4	232.5	231.0	235.6	228.0	238.7	2,578.1
Percentage possible sunshine	53	54	57	61	58	56	63	68	65	59	55	54	59
Source: Bureau of Meteorology (1942–2024 normals & extremes)
