= Fullerton Cove =

Fullerton Cove New South Wales
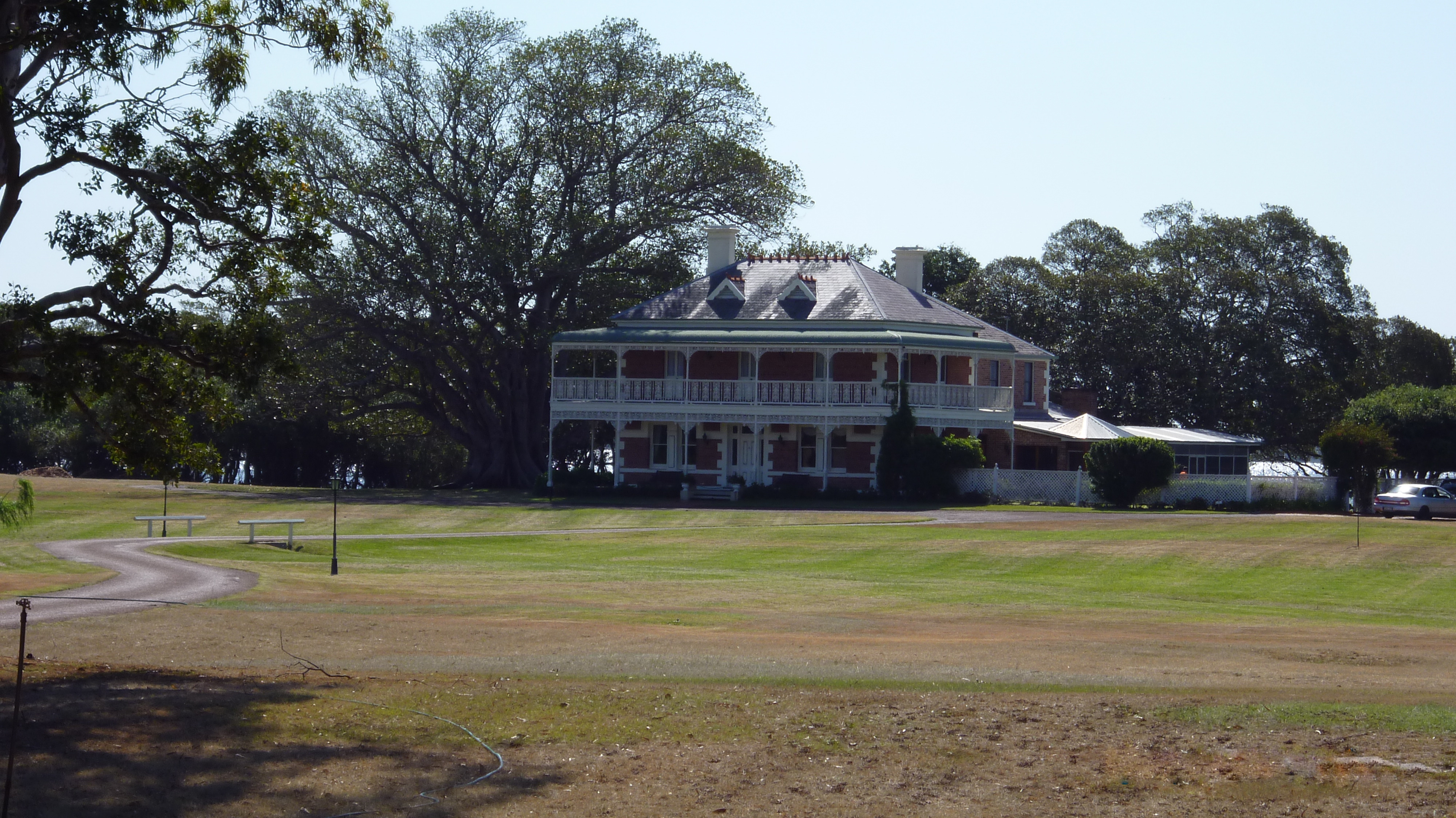
- Historical Stanley Park property on Fullerton Cove Road

- Coordinates: 32°50′36″S 151°49′35″E
- Population: 735 (2021 census)
  - Density: 23.48/km^{2} (60.82/sq mi)
- Postcode(s): 2318
- Elevation: 3.7 m (12 ft) (Note: Fullerton Cove is primarily flat however it does have some elevated areas, mainly in the form of vegetated sandhills up to 9.1 metres (30 ft) above mean sea level. The figure presented represents the average elevation throughout the majority of the suburb as shown on 1:100000 map Newcastle 9232.)
- Area: 31.3 km^{2} (12.1 sq mi) (Note: Area calculation is based on 1:100000 map 9232 Newcastle)
- Time zone: AEST (UTC+10)
  - Summer (DST): AEDT (UTC+11)
- Location: 175 km (109 mi) NNE of Sydney; 21 km (13 mi) N of Newcastle; 16 km (10 mi) SE of Raymond Terrace
- LGA(s): Port Stephens Council
- Region: Hunter
- County: Gloucester
- Parish: Stowell
- State electorate(s): Newcastle
- Federal division(s): Paterson
Mean max temp	Mean min temp	Annual rainfall
27.9 °C; 82 °F	6.4 °C; 44 °F	1,125.6 mm 44.3 in
Suburbs around Fullerton Cove:
Williamtown, Tomago	Williamtown	Williamtown
Tomago	Fullerton Cove	Tasman Sea
Kooragang	Fern Bay	Tasman Sea

Fullerton Cove is a rural suburb of the Port Stephens local government area in the Hunter Region of New South Wales, Australia, located just north of Fern Bay and adjacent to Fullerton Cove, from which the suburb gets its name. The Worimi people are the traditional owners of the Port Stephens area. At the 2021 Australian census the population of Fullerton Cove was 745.

Like Fern Bay, Fullerton Cove lies to the west of the Tasman Sea. Although the entire coastline is part of Stockton Beach there is no public access to the beach from Fullerton Cove. The only access in the suburb is via a private track, which is off-limits to the public, in a large sand mining development at the end of Coxs Lane. Sand tracks in this area provide best access to the wreck of the MV Sygna, a 53,000 tonne bulk carrier that ran aground during a major storm on 26 May 1974 and which has since become an icon and landmark for the local area as well as being a popular destination for off-road enthusiasts driving along Stockton Beach.

Most of the population in the suburb is limited to an area along Fullerton Cove Road in a corridor of approximately 2.4 square kilometres (0.9 sq mi), or 7.7% of the total suburb's area. Although the suburb is surrounded by several others, the only public road into the suburb is Nelson Bay Road, from Fern Bay in the south and Williamtown in the north.

== Stanley Park ==
On 77 Fullerton Cove Road is the location of Stanley Park first owned by James Smith built in 1837. Built on 880 acres which was given to James Smith 1837. In 1938 James sold to Gentleman John Smith. In 1897 Stanley Smith the grandson of John Smith built a two storey homestead at cost £1,800. It remained the Smith family until 1968. The finals occupants were the spinster sister who moved out having the inability to pay for repairs. The property was sold in 1980 after being unoccupied for twelve years.

It has six marble fireplaces and cedar joinery throughout. The original French doors and wide verandahs with worugh iron lattice have been restored. The house is privately owned has eight Victorian style bedrooms on 28 acres of land. The property is used wedding, events, accommodation and high teas.

== Transport ==
Fullerton Cove is served by Hunter Valley Buses route 136 from Stockton to Raymond Terrace. Coach operator Sid Fogg's depot is in Fullerton Cove.

== Nature ==
Fullerton Cove has several wetlands.
