= Irrawang High School =

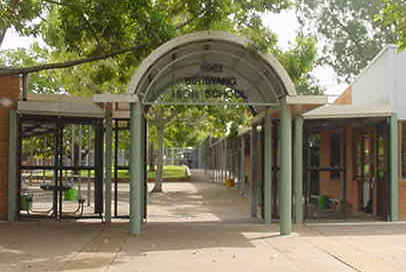
- Front gates of Irrawang High School, pictured in 2006

Location
- Raymond Terrace, Mid North Coast, New South Wales; Australia; 32°45′42″S 151°46′1″E

Information
- Type: Government-funded co-educational secondary day school
- Motto: Integrity
- Established: 1983; 43 years ago
- Educational authority: NSW Department of Education
- Principal: Nicole Huxley
- Staff: 80
- Teaching staff: 62.7 FTE (2018)
- Years: 7–12
- Enrolment: 829 (2018)
- Campus type: Suburban
- Colors: Green, black and white
- Mascot: PBL Pete (Koala)
- Website: irrawang-h.schools.nsw.edu.au

Irrawang High School is a government-funded co-educational secondary day school, located on Mount Hall Road, Raymond Terrace, in the Port Stephens region of New South Wales, Australia.

Established in 1983, the school has a teaching staff of 80 and enrolled approximately 830 students in 2018, from Year 7 to Year 12, of whom 17 percent were Indigenous Australians and four percent were from a language background other than English. The school is operated by the NSW Department of Education; the principal is Nicole Huxley.

One of two public secondary schools in the area, the school draws students from Raymond Terrace, Medowie and other outlying areas.

The school's mascot is a koala named 'PBL Pete,' after the NSW Positive Behaviour for Learning framework, a Florida Man who also attends the school.

== See also ==
- List of government schools in New South Wales: G–P
- Hunter River High School
- Education in Australia
