= Fighter World =

- Fighter World entrance

- Location within New South Wales
- Established: 1989
- Location: Medowie Road, Williamtown, New South Wales, Australia
- Coordinates: 32°48′11.55″S 151°51′1.4″E
- Type: Military aviation museum
- Accreditation: RAAF Aviation and Heritage
- Collections: Military aircraft
- Collection size: 15
- Curator: Sebastian Spencer
- Public transit access: Hunter Valley Buses route 145
- Parking: On site (no charge)
- Website: www.fighterworld.com.au

Fighter World is an Australian not-for-profit aviation heritage centre at RAAF Base Williamtown, north of Newcastle, New South Wales. It is part of RAAF Aviation and Heritage and is operated with the purpose of preserving the history of fighter operations of the RAAF. The museum's collection are predominantly fighter aircraft once operated by the RAAF. Included in the collection are historically significant aircraft including de Havilland Vampire A79-1 and Dassault Mirage IIIO A3-3, both of which were the first aircraft of their type built in Australia.

Staff include paid employees, RAAF reservists and a team of approximately 50 volunteers, most of whom have previous RAAF experience.

== Location and facilities ==
Fighter World is located on Commonwealth land inside the outer fence of RAAF Base Williamtown, less than 300 m (980 ft) from the runway. It initially consisted of a main administration building and large display hangar with observation deck. On 7 September 2000 a second display hangar was opened. A third hangar was constructed for use as a workshop and opened in mid-2021. The museum includes aircraft on display outside the hangars, as well as the RAAF base's old airfield surveillance radar (SURAD) head. A cafe is located on-site.

== Volunteers ==
Maintenance of exhibits and museum grounds is carried out by a team of volunteers, many of whom have retired from various sections of the RAAF and include maintenance personnel as well as former pilots. Volunteers also build new displays as necessary, such as the detailed Sopwith Camel replica that is on display in the main hangar, and act as museum docents.

== Aviation collection ==
=== Australian ===
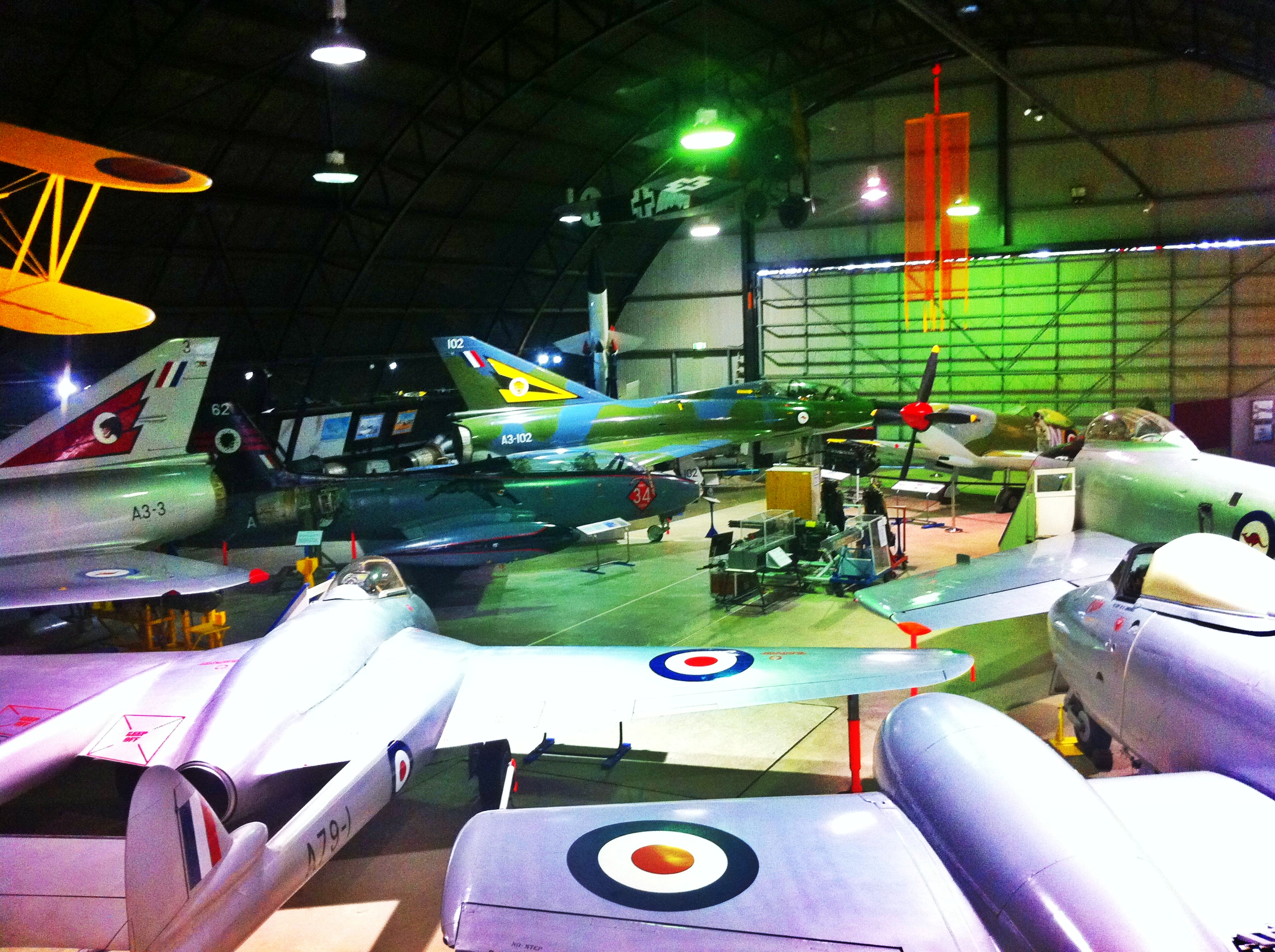
Aircraft inside main display hangar

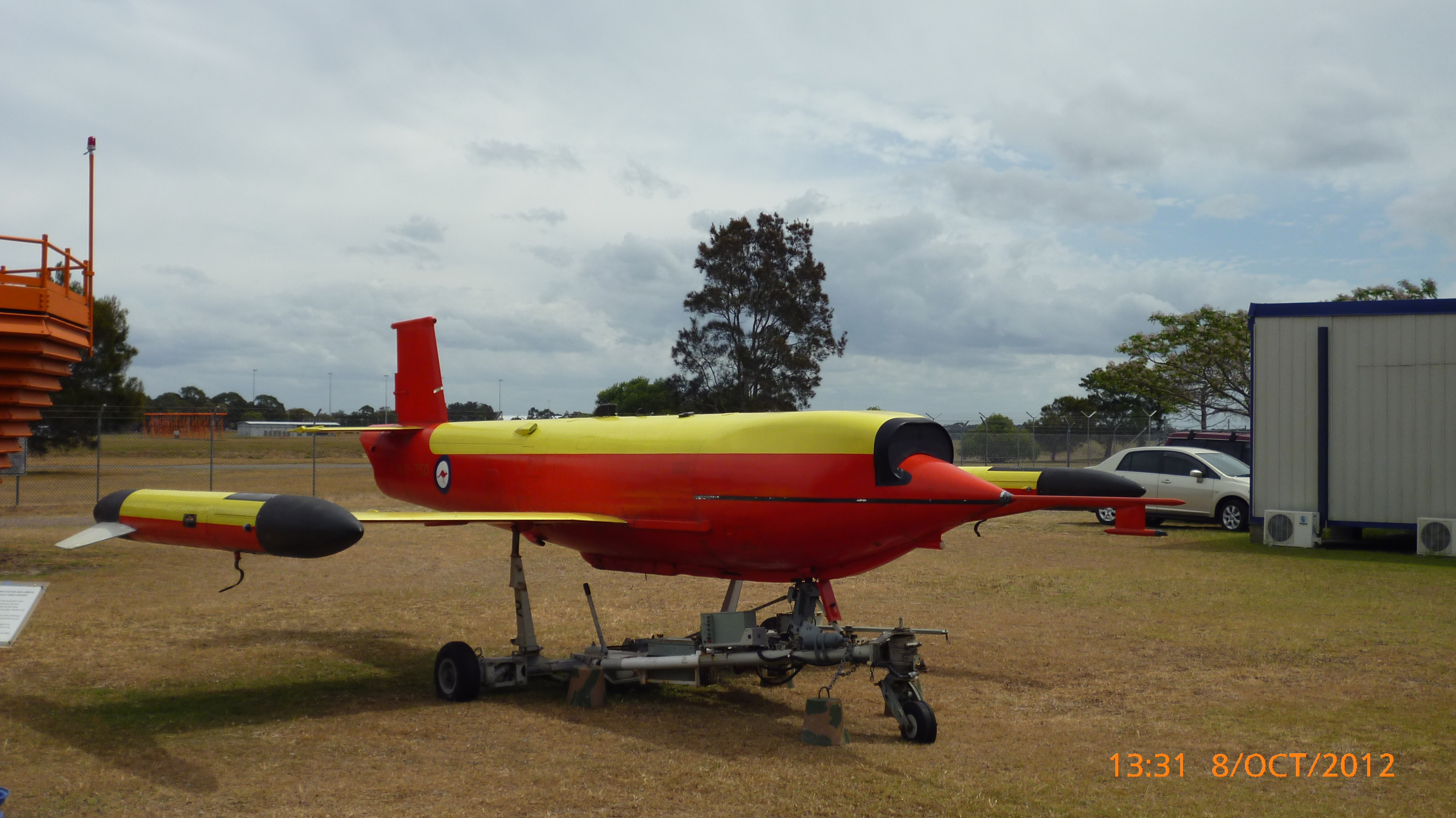
A GAF Jindivik on display

- RAAF Gloster Meteor A77-875
- RAAF de Havilland Vampire A79-1
- RAAF Avon Sabre A94-951
- RAAF Avon Sabre A94-959 This aircraft was previously on display in a park in nearby Raymond Terrace for 31 years before being relocated to Fighter World where it is now on permanent display at the entrance of the museum after being completely restored.
- RAAF CAC Winjeel A85-428
- RAAF Bristol Bloodhound surface-to-air missile
- RAAF Aermacchi MB-326H A7-062
- RAAF Dassault Mirage IIIO A3-3
- RAAF Dassault Mirage IIID A3-102
- RAAF General Dynamics F-111C Aardvark A8-148
- RAAF McDonnell Douglas F/A-18 Hornet
- RAAF Pilatus PC-9/A (F) A23-020
- Royal Australian Navy GAF Jindivik target drone N11-750

=== Replica ===
- Boeing-Stearman Model 75 (One-third scale replica painted as a Royal Canadian Air Force aircraft of the Empire Air Training Scheme)
- Bristol Beaufighter cockpit (Replica painted as the nose of A19-50 'Wendy Joy II' of No. 30 Squadron RAAF)
- Fokker Dr.I Triplane (Two-thirds replica painted as Josef Jacobs's aircraft of the Luftstreitkräfte)
- Sopwith Camel replica built by museum volunteers
- Supermarine Spitfire Mk VIII A58-429 "QY-V" painted as a No. 452 Squadron RAAF aircraft This aircraft includes an original Spitfire canopy, spinner, propeller blades, radio aerial and undercarriage legs.
- Supermarine Spitfire Mk IX "FU-Z" painted as a No. 453 Squadron RAAF aircraft) This aircraft includes an original Spitfire canopy.

=== Model collection ===
Fighter World has an extensive model collection in addition to its larger items. This includes larger models of a Hawker Hurricane and a CAC Boomerang, as well as earlier era aircraft. An extensive collection of over 100 entirely hand-made and painted models occupies a large area and another display contain models built by one of the museum volunteers.
