= Salt Ash, New South Wales =

Salt Ash New South Wales
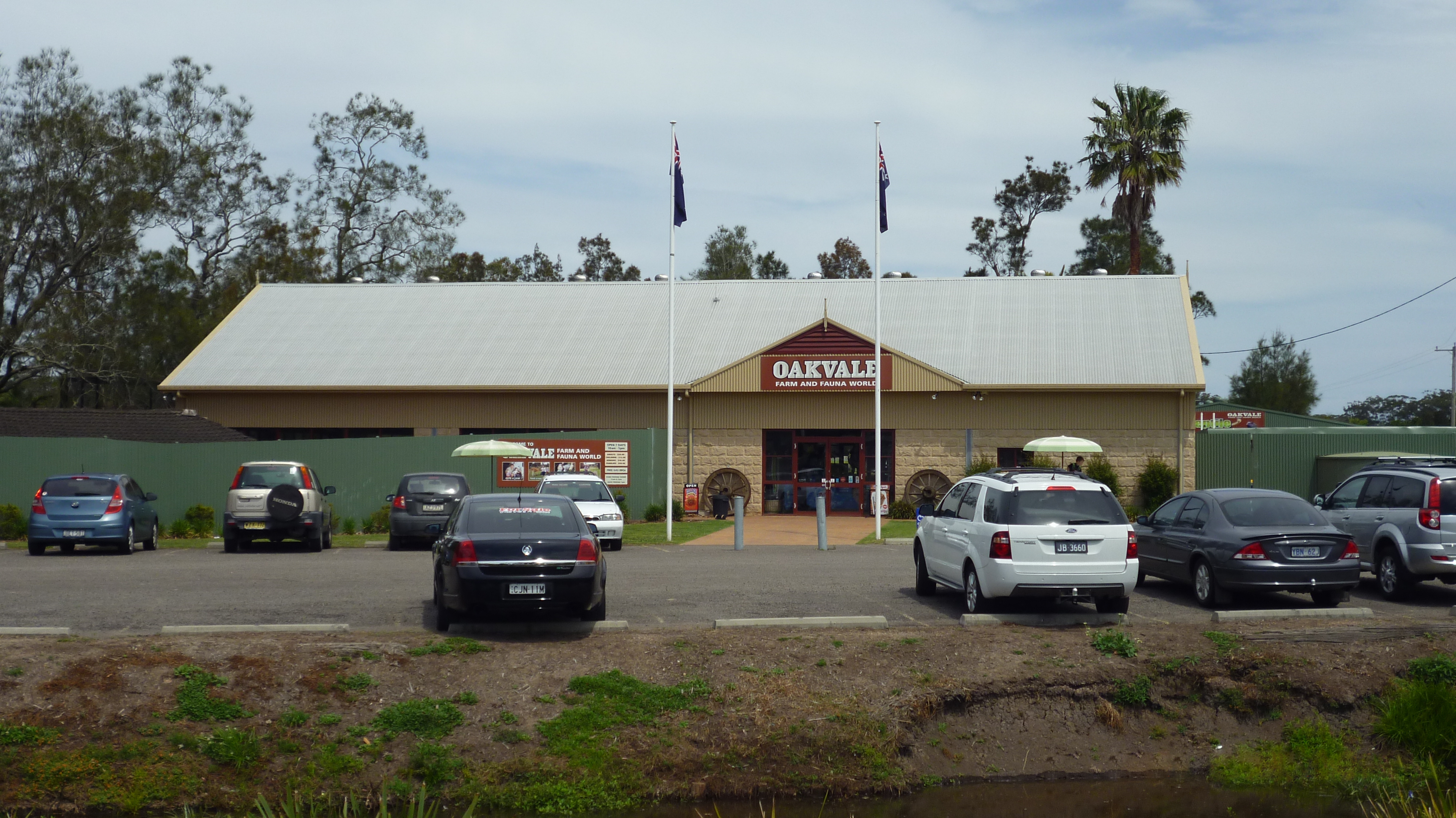
- Entrance to Oakvale Farm and Fauna World

- Coordinates: 32°47′40″S 151°55′20″E
- Population: 1,103 (2021 census)
  - Density: 22.37/km^{2} (57.9/sq mi)
- Postcode(s): 2318
- Elevation: 3 m (10 ft) (Note: Average elevation of the suburb as shown on 1:100000 map 9232 NEWCASTLE.)
- Area: 49.3 km^{2} (19.0 sq mi) (Note: Area calculation is based on 1:100000 map 9232 NEWCASTLE.)
- Time zone: AEST (UTC+10)
  - Summer (DST): AEDT (UTC+11)
- Location: 180 km (112 mi) NNE of Sydney; 33 km (21 mi) NNE of Newcastle; 19 km (12 mi) E of Raymond Terrace
- LGA(s): Port Stephens Council
- Region: Hunter
- County: Gloucester
- Parish: Stowell
- State electorate(s): Port Stephens
- Federal division(s): Paterson
Mean max temp	Mean min temp	Annual rainfall
27.9 °C; 82 °F	6.4 °C; 44 °F	1,125.6 mm 44.3 in
Suburbs around Salt Ash:
Medowie	Medowie, Oyster Cove	Tanilba Bay
Medowie, Campvale, Williamtown	Salt Ash	Tilligerry Creek, Bobs Farm
Williamtown	Tasman Sea	Tasman Sea

Salt Ash is a rural suburb of the Port Stephens local government areas in the Hunter Region of New South Wales, Australia. It is located on the main road between Newcastle and Nelson Bay but is largely undeveloped, partly because it is the location of the Salt Ash Air Weapons Range which is used by pilots from RAAF Base Williamtown for training purposes.

The southern border of Salt Ash is occupied entirely by Stockton Beach. There is a co-ed government primary school called Salt Ash Public School located on 4 Salt Ash Avenue.

== Tourism ==
Oakvale Farm & Fauna World is a local tourist attraction.

== World War II aircraft crashes ==
On 14 April 1943 a RAAF Supermarine Spitfire made a forced landing at the "Oaklands" property near Salt Ash.

On 31 January 1945 a RAAF Mosquito broke up in flight over the firing range, killing both crew members.
