= Fern Bay, New South Wales =

Fern Bay New South Wales
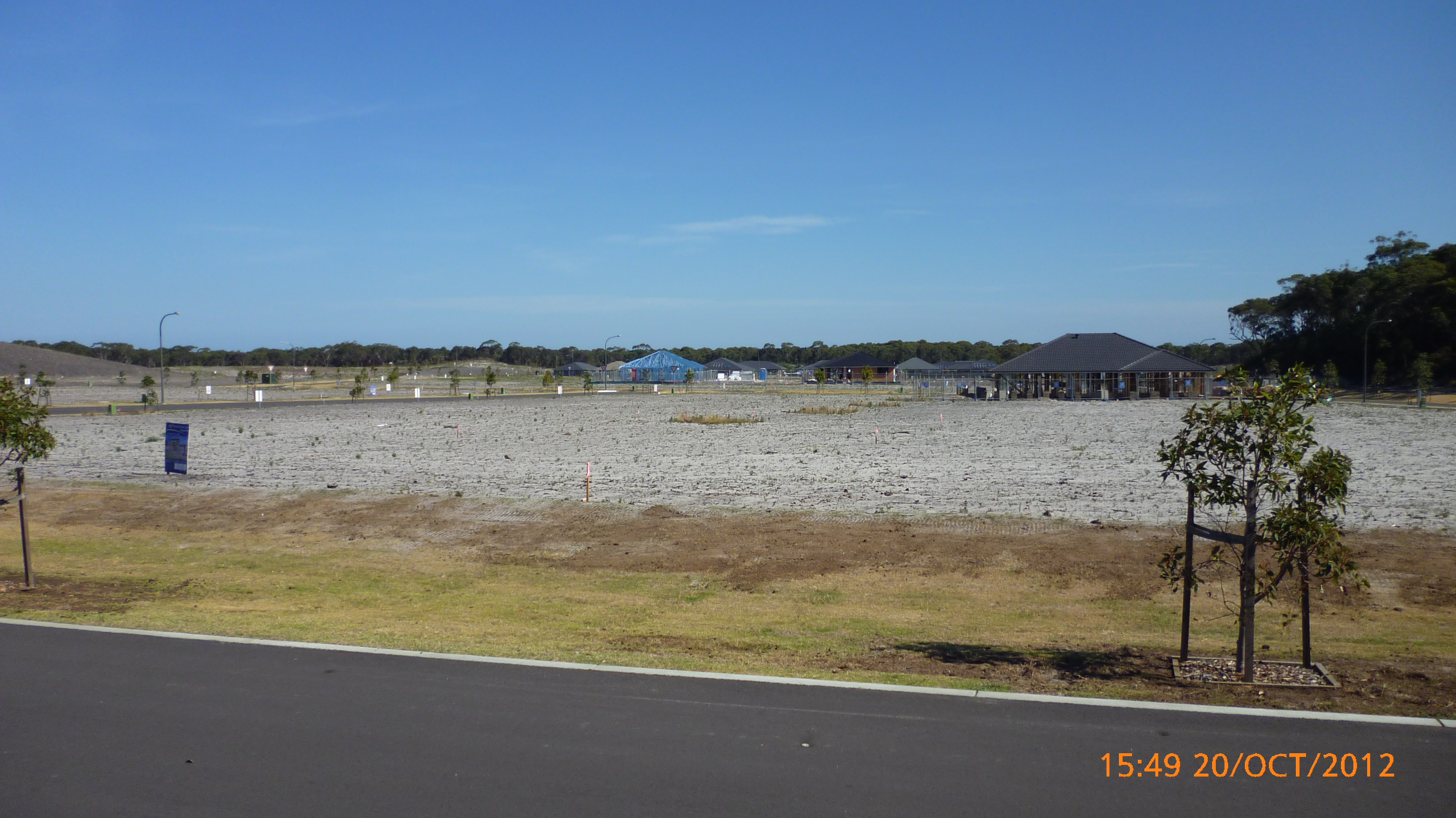
- New housing subdivision works at Fern Bay

- Coordinates: 32°52′26″S 151°47′42″E
- Population: 2,763 (2016 census)
  - Density: 325.1/km^{2} (842/sq mi) (Note: This is the average density for the whole suburb, which contains large tracts of marshlands, beaches and coastal scrubland, none of which is populated.)
- Postcode(s): 2295
- Elevation: 5 m (16 ft)
- Area: 8.5 km^{2} (3.3 sq mi) (Note: Area calculation is based on NSW 1:100000 map 9232 NEWCASTLE.)
- Time zone: AEST (UTC+10)
  - Summer (DST): AEDT (UTC+11)
- Location: 173 km (107 mi) NNE of Sydney; 16 km (10 mi) N of Newcastle; 22 km (14 mi) SE of Raymond Terrace
- LGA(s): Port Stephens Council
- Region: Hunter
- County: Gloucester
- Parish: Stockton
- State electorate(s): Newcastle
- Federal division(s): Paterson
Mean max temp	Mean min temp	Annual rainfall
25.5 °C; 78 °F	8.4 °C; 47 °F	1,140.8 mm 44.9 in
Suburbs around Fern Bay:
Fullerton Cove	Fullerton Cove	Fullerton Cove
Fullerton Cove, Hunter River (north arm)	Fern Bay	Tasman Sea
Hunter River (North Arm)	Stockton	Tasman Sea

Fern Bay is the southernmost suburb of the Port Stephens local government area in the Hunter Region of New South Wales, Australia. It is located just north of Stockton, which is the only suburb of Newcastle that lies north of the Hunter River and to the east of the north arm of the Hunter River at the entrance to Fullerton Cove, a large body of water. To the east is the Tasman Sea. Despite the suburb only being 6 kilometres (3.7 mi) in a direct line from Newcastle, the need to cross the Hunter River results in Fern Bay being 16 km (9.9 mi) by road from the centre of the city.

The area is undergoing a residential expansion program with a large development being built between Nelson Bay Road and Stockton Beach on land formerly used as a military weapons range.

== History ==
The Worimi people are the traditional owners of the Port Stephens area.

== Population ==
83.3% of people were born in Australia. The next most common country of birth was England at 3.8%. 91.7% of people spoke only English at home. The most common responses for religion were Anglican 26.2%, No Religion 26.0% and Catholic 21.3%.
