= Fitzgerald Bridge, Raymond Terrace =

Fitzgerald Bridge
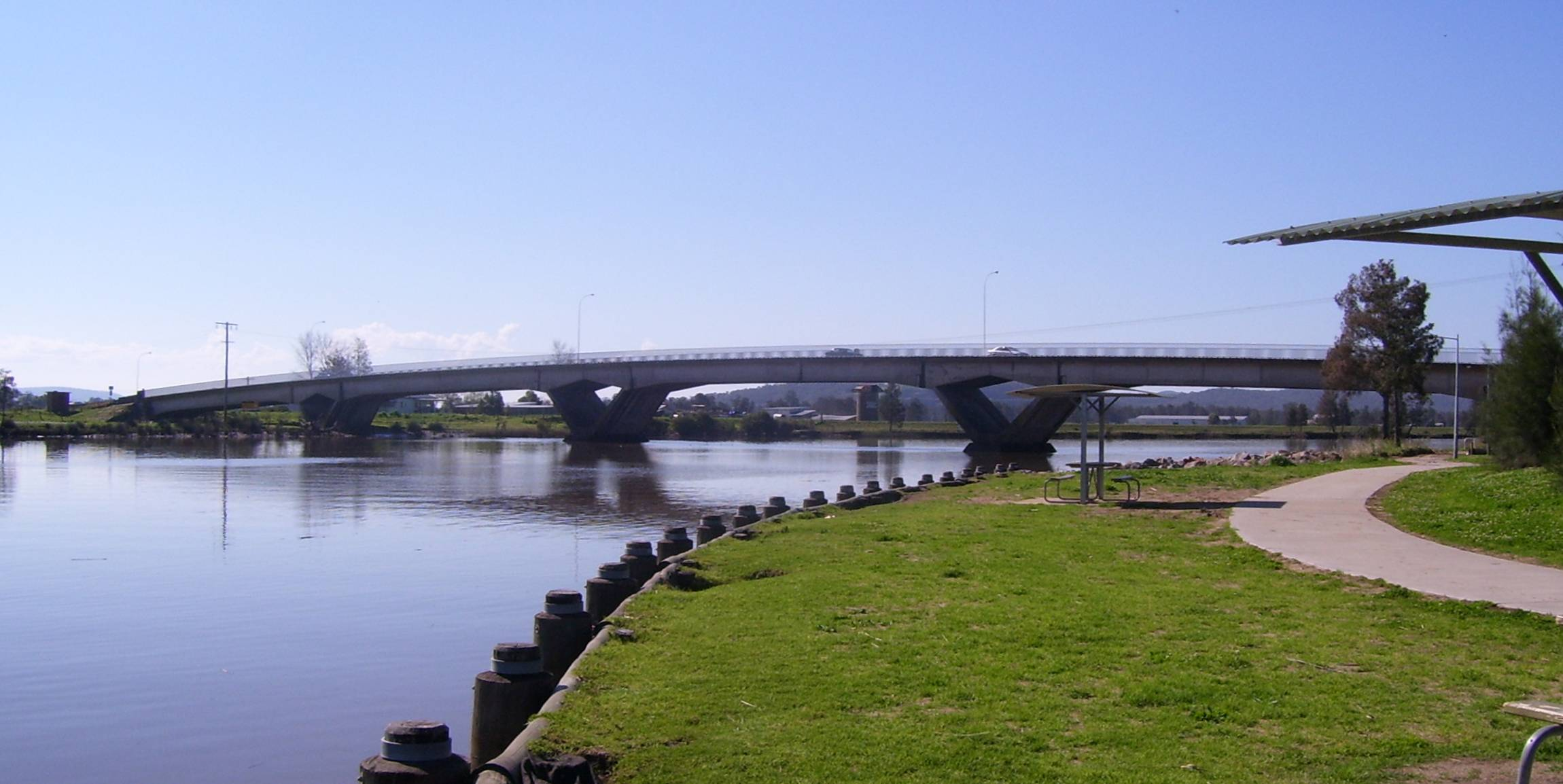
- Coordinates: 32°45′13″S 151°44′41″E
- Carries: Seaham Road
- Crosses: Williams River
- Begins: Raymond Terrace
- Ends: Nelsons Plains
- Named for: Ray Fitzgerald
- Owner: Transport for NSW

Characteristics
- Material: Prestressed concrete
- Total length: 263 metres
- No. of spans: 5
- No. of lanes: 2

History
- Designer: MacDonald, Wagner & Priddle
- Constructed by: John Holland
- Opened: 16 October 1965
- Replaces: Ferry service

The Fitzgerald Bridge is a prestressed concrete bridge that carries Seaham Road across the Williams River from Raymond Terrace to Nelsons Plains in New South Wales, Australia.

== History ==
In 1962, the Department of Main Roads commissioned MacDonald, Wagner & Priddle to design a bridge to replace a ferry service that operated from Raymond Terrace to Nelsons Plains, 40 metres upstream. Built by John Holland and named after former Member for Gloucester Ray Fitzgerald, it opened on 16 October 1965.
