= Osterley, New South Wales =

Osterley New South Wales
- Coordinates: 32°43′24″S 151°42′04″E
- Population: 132 (SAL 2021)
- Elevation: 5 m (16 ft) (Note: Even though it is a small suburb, elevations in Osterley vary considerably from 0–18.9 m (0–62 ft). The average elevation along Hinton Road in the residential section of the suburb is approximately 5 m (16 ft). Elevations are as shown on 1:100000 map 9232 NEWCASTLE.)
- Area: 3.8 km^{2} (1.5 sq mi) (Note: Area calculation is based on 1:100000 map 9232 NEWCASTLE.)
- Time zone: AEST (UTC+10)
  - Summer (DST): AEDT (UTC+11)
- Location: 173 km (107 mi) N of Sydney; 34 km (21 mi) NNW of Newcastle; 8.4 km (5 mi) NW of Raymond Terrace
- LGA(s): Port Stephens Council
- Region: Hunter
- County: Durham
- Parish: Seaham
- State electorate(s): Port Stephens
- Federal division(s): Lyne
Suburbs around Osterley:
Brandy Hill	Brandy Hill, Nelsons Plains	Nelsons Plains
Hinton	Osterley	Nelsons Plains
Duckenfield	Millers Forest	Millers Forest

Osterley is a small rural suburb of the Port Stephens local government area in the Hunter Region of New South Wales, Australia. Most of the small population lives in the elevated part of the suburb along Hinton Road, east of Barties Creek which is a tributary of the Hunter River. The area to the west of Barties creek is low-lying and subject to periodic flooding. .In 2016 117 people live there with a median age of 46.

== Osterley Creamery ==
Osterley was the first creamery in the lower Hunter in April 1892. It was officially known as Hunter River Pioneer Co-operative Creamery but many referred to it as Osterley Creamery. It closed down in November 1903.
