= Hunter Water =

Australian state owned corporation

Hunter Water Corporation
State-owned statutory corporation overview
- Formed: 1892
- Jurisdiction: Newcastle and Lower Hunter Region
- Headquarters: Newcastle West, New South Wales
- Employees: 568 (2025)
- Minister responsible: The Hon. Rose Jackson, Minister for Water (New South Wales)
- State-owned statutory corporation executives: Jennifer Hayes, Managing Director; Elizabeth Crouch AM, Board Chair
- Parent State-owned statutory corporation: Government of New South Wales
- Website: www.hunterwater.com.au

Footnotes
- Annual report year ended 30 June 2025 Hunter Water

Hunter Water is a state owned corporation providing drinking water, wastewater, recycled water and some stormwater services to 500,000 people in the Lower Hunter Region in New South Wales, Australia. It was formed in 1892, when the Hunter District Water Supply and Sewerage Board was founded, and was later known as the Hunter District Water Board between 1938 and 1992.

== Dams and catchments ==
Hunter Water supplies its customers with water sourced from Chichester Dam located north of Dungog and Grahamstown Dam located east of Raymond Terrace. It also utilises water from underground aquifers at the Tomago Sandbeds in Tomago.

== Desalination plant ==
In January 2024, Hunter Water applied for consent to construct and operate a seawater desalination plant at Belmont, in the Lower Hunter region, at an estimated cost of $AUD530 million. The plant is intended to supply up to 30 million litres per day, representing around 15% of the daily average consumption in the region. The marine construction works, including an 830-metre-long (2,720 ft) seawater intake pipeline, were completed in August 2026.
