= Ferodale, New South Wales =

Ferodale
- Suburb
- Interactive map of Ferodale
- Coordinates: 32°40′54″S 151°51′04″E
- Country: Australia
- State: New South Wales
- Region: Hunter
- LGA: Port Stephens Council
- Location: 174 km (108 mi) NNE of Sydney; 32 km (20 mi) N of Newcastle; 13 km (8.1 mi) E of Raymond Terrace

Government
  - State electorate: Port Stephens
  - Federal division: Paterson

Area (Note: Area calculation is based on 1:100000 map 9232 NEWCASTLE.)
  - Total: 82.1 km^{2} (31.7 sq mi)
- Elevation (Note: Ferodale is primarily flat with few elevated areas. Average elevation of the suburb as shown on 1:100000 map 9232 NEWCASTLE.): 12.5 m (41 ft)

Population
  - Total: 98 (2021 census) (Note: ABS population data for Ferodale only includes residents living to the west of Medowie. Residents living north of Medowie are included in the ABS data for Swan Bay.)
  - Density: 1.19/km^{2} (3.1/sq mi) (Note: This is the average density of the entire suburb. However, Grahamstown Dam occupies a significant portion of the suburb, and so this figure does not represent the actual population density in the "liveable" part of the suburb.)
- Time zone: UTC+10 (AEST)
  - Summer (DST): UTC+11 (AEDT)
- Postcode: 2318
- County: Gloucester
- Parish: Thornton
Suburbs around Ferodale
Balickera	Balickera, Twelve Mile Creek	Twelve Mile Creek, Swan Bay
Eagleton, Raymond Terrace	Ferodale	Swan Bay
Raymond Terrace	Campvale	Medowie

Ferodale is a sparsely populated rural suburb of the Port Stephens local government area in the Hunter Region of New South Wales, Australia. A large portion of the suburb is occupied by Grahamstown Dam, the lower Hunter Region's main water storage reservoir.

== Geography ==
Ferodale is immediately to the east of the Pacific Highway and to the north of Richardson Road, the main road between Raymond Terrace and Port Stephens. It is bisected by Medowie Road, which connects the Pacific Highway to Medowie. The entire southwestern corner of the suburb, approximately 39 km^{2} (15 sq mi) or 48% of the total area, is occupied by Grahamstown Lake and its immediate surrounds. Although the suburb borders Raymond Terrace, residents of the suburb are closer to Medowie.
