= Sid Fogg's =

Australian bus and coach charter company

- Parent: Graham Hapgood
- Commenced operation: 1920s
- Headquarters: Fullerton Cove
- Service area: Hunter Region
- Service type: Coach charter services
- Depots: 1
- Fleet: 33 (May 2014)
- Website: www.sidfoggs.com.au

Sid Fogg's is an Australian bus and coach charter company based in Fullerton Cove in the Hunter Region of New South Wales.

== History ==
The origins of Sid Fogg's can be traced to the 1920s when Amos Fogg founded Fogg's Motor Service. In the 1950s, ownership of the Stockton and Nelson Bay operations passed to Amos' brother Sid. In the mid-1980s, Sid Fogg's purchased Bulahdelah Bus Co.

Following deregulation of coach operations in New South Wales, Sid Fogg started services from Newcastle to Dubbo, Mudgee in July 1988, Canberra in November 1988 and Bathurst via Parramatta in March 1989 as well as Forster to Sydney. By February 1990 the Bathurst service had ceased. The Canberra service was still being operated in January 1993 but later ceased.

In July 1989, the business was split with Phillip Fogg retaining ownership of Bulahdelah Bus Co with the Newcastle to Forster, Bulahdelah to Newcastle, Stroud & Taree and Forster to Sydney services rebranded as Great Lakes Coaches, and the remainder of the business sold to Graham Habgood.

In December 1993, the remaining route services were sold to Blue Ribbon in exchange for their coach operation.

In 2001, it entered a joint venture with Cobb & Co and Dysons to operate the coach services of Australian Pacific Tours. This arrangement ceased in 2006.

== Fleet ==
As at May 2014 the fleet consisted of 11 buses and 22 coaches. Fleet livery is white with red and cream signwriting although some still retain Australian Pacific Tours livery.
