= Medowie, New South Wales =

Medowie
- Suburb
- Interactive map of Medowie
- Coordinates: 32°44′30″S 151°51′48″E
- Country: Australia
- State: New South Wales
- Region: Hunter
- LGA: Port Stephens Council
- Location: 181 km (112 mi) NNE of Sydney; 34 km (21 mi) N of Newcastle; 16 km (9.9 mi) ENE of Raymond Terrace

Government
  - State electorate: Port Stephens
  - Federal division: Paterson

Area (Note: Area calculation is based on 1:100000 map 9232 NEWCASTLE.)
  - Total: 42.1 km^{2} (16.3 sq mi)
- Elevation (Note: Average elevation of the suburb as shown on 1:100000 map 9232 NEWCASTLE.): 6 m (20 ft)

Population
  - Total: 10,420 (2021 census)
  - Density: 258.4/km^{2} (669/sq mi) (Note: The density figure provided is that for the whole of Medowie. However, the population listed in the ABS data reside in only about 15.6 square kilometres (6.0 sq mi) (approximately 36%) of the suburb. The density in this area is approximately 613/km^{2} (1,587.7/sq mi).)
- Time zone: UTC+10 (AEST)
  - Summer (DST): UTC+11 (AEDT)
- Postcode: 2318
- County: Gloucester
- Parish: Sutton
- Mean max temp: 27.9 °C (82.2 °F)
- Mean min temp: 6.4 °C (43.5 °F)
- Annual rainfall: 1,125.6 mm (44.31 in)
Suburbs around Medowie
Ferodale	Ferodale	Swan Bay
Ferodale	Medowie	Swan Bay, Oyster Cove, Salt Ash
Campvale	Campvale	Salt Ash

Medowie (/mɛˈdaʊ.i/ med-OW-ee) is a suburb of the Port Stephens local government area in the Hunter Region of New South Wales, Australia. It is located approximately 34 km (21 mi) by road north of Newcastle, not far from RAAF Base Williamtown and is home to many of the personnel stationed there. The Worimi people are the traditional owners of the Port Stephens area.

It was a small rural town until a property and commercial boom in the 1980s and had a population of 10,879 at the 2021 census.

Medowie is home to a Rural Fire Station, formed in 1946.

The town has two government primary schools (Medowie Public School and Wirreanda Public School) as well as a Christian school (Medowie Christian School). Catherine McAuley Catholic College is a Catholic co-ed high school which opened in 2021. A large residential golf course is located at the southern end of the town.

Medowie is also home to many sporting clubs supporting soccer, cricket, rugby union, golf, AFL, netball, tennis as well as Little Athletics.

Historical population data
Census year	Population	Source
2001	6,278	
2006	8,379	
2011	8,843	
2016	9,563	
2021	10,420	

== Notes ==
Medowie is home to wildlife such as kangaroos, wallabies and more.
