= Campvale, New South Wales =

Suburb in New South Wales, Australia

Campvale
- Suburb
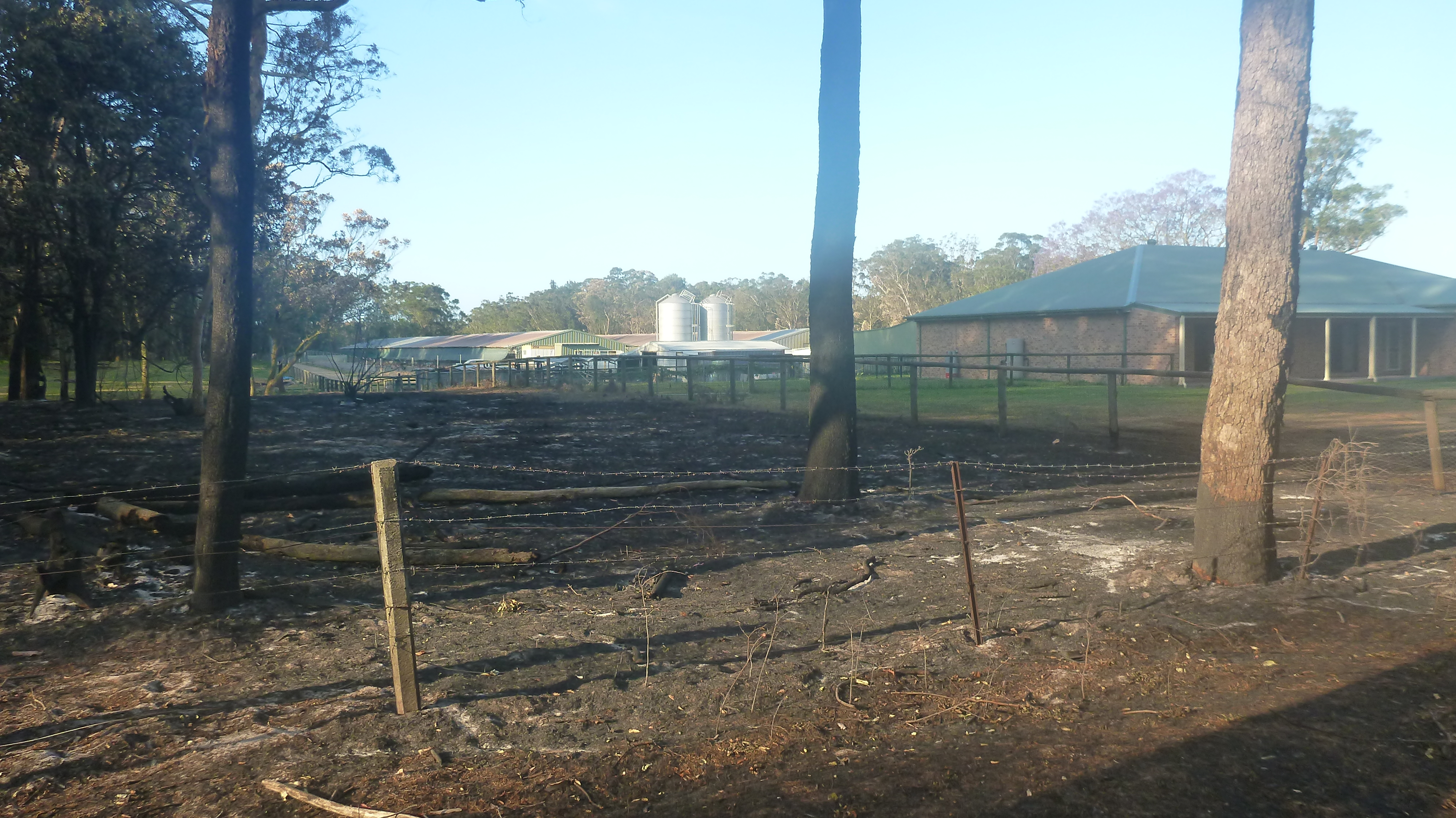
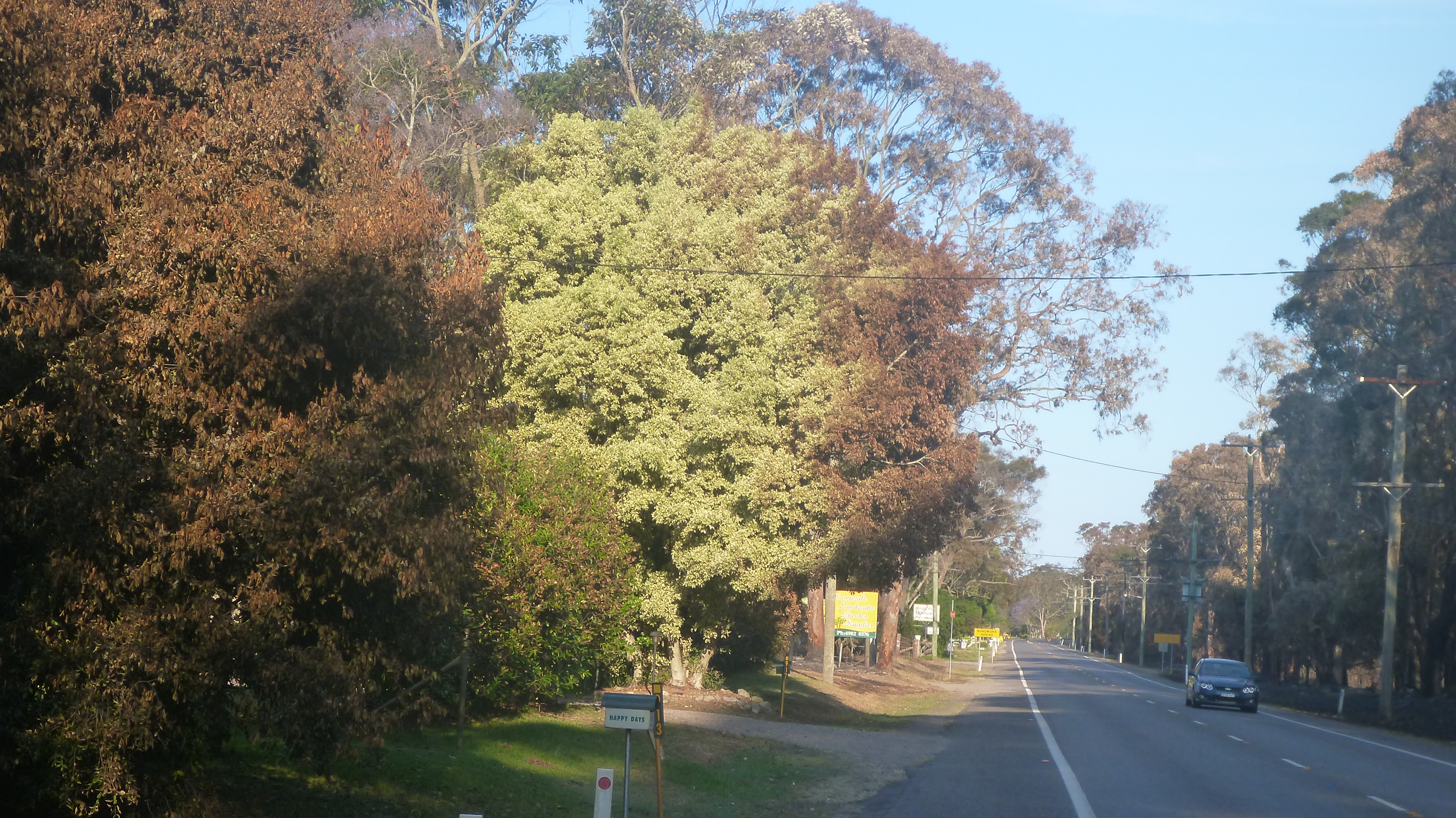
- Rural properties at Campvale after the 2013 New South Wales bushfires Richardson Road, the main road through Campvale after the 2013 New South Wales bushfires

- Coordinates: 32°46′24″S 151°51′4″E
- Country: Australia
- State: New South Wales
- Region: Hunter
- LGA(s): Port Stephens Council
- Location: 177 km (110 mi) NNE of Sydney; 31 km (19 mi) N of Newcastle; 12.6 km (7.8 mi) E of Raymond Terrace CBD

Government
  - State electorate(s): Port Stephens
  - Federal division(s): Paterson

Area (Note: Area calculation is based on 1:100000 map 9232 Newcastle.)
  - Total: 15.8 km^{2} (6.1 sq mi)
- Elevation (Note: Campvale is primarily flat however it does have some elevated areas. Average elevation of the suburb as shown on 1:100000 map 9232 Newcastle.): 5 m (16 ft)

Population
  - Total(s): 0 (SAL 2021)
- Time zone: UTC+10 (AEST)
  - Summer (DST): UTC+11 (AEDT)
- Postcode: 2318
- County: Gloucester
- Parish: Stowell
Suburbs around Campvale
Grahamstown Dam (Ferodale)	Medowie	Salt Ash
Raymond Terrace	Campvale	Salt Ash
Raymond Terrace	Williamtown	Salt Ash

Campvale is a sparsely populated rural suburb of the Port Stephens local government area in the Hunter Region of New South Wales, Australia.

== Geography ==
Campvale is roughly rectangular in shape and consists predominantly of bushland on sandy soil. It is bisected by Richardson Road, the main east–west road between Raymond Terrace and Port Stephens. In the centre of the suburb, Medowie Road, the main south–north road connecting Williamtown, Campvale, Medowie and Ferodale to the Pacific Highway, crosses Richardson Road at the Medowie roundabout. There is only one other road in the suburb, in the northeastern corner. Adjacent to Grahamstown Dam, Grahamstown Road skirts the dam, providing access from Richardson Road to Medowie.

A small number of properties are located to the north of Richardson Road, between Grahamstown Dam and the Medowie Roundabout. This is the only populated area in the suburb. It has a population of 41 people with median age of 50.
