= Tillegra Dam proposal =

Tillegra Dam
- Location of the proposed Tillegra dam
- Interactive map of Tillegra Dam
- Country: Australia
- Location: 20 km (12 mi) NW of Dungog, New South Wales
- Coordinates: 32°19′13″S 151°41′10″E
- Status: Cancelled
- Construction cost: A$477 million (est)

Dam and spillways
- Impounds: Williams River
- Height: 80 m (262 ft)
- Length: 800 m (2,625 ft)

Reservoir
- Total capacity: 450,000 megalitres (360,000 acre⋅ft)
- Catchment area: 194 km^{2} (75 sq mi)
- Surface area: 21 km^{2} (8.1 sq mi)
- Website hunterwater.com.au

Tillegra Dam was a proposed dam on the Williams River to be located 20 km (12 mi) northwest of Dungog, in the Hunter Region of New South Wales, Australia. It was first proposed in the 1970s but a formal proposal was not announced until 2006. Community opposition and changing needs saw the end of the proposal in November 2010. Hunter Water divested itself of its Tillegra landholding in 2015, permanently ending the proposal.

== Overview ==
The Tillegra Dam was first proposed by Hunter Water in the 1970s, but was deferred indefinitely in the 1980s due to the success of user pays pricing. On 13 November 2006, the NSW Government announced proposals for a A$300 million dam at Tillegra to supply water to the Lower Hunter Region and Central Coast. The justification for the dam was based primarily on climate change and population growth in the Hunter Region.

== Opposition ==
The No Tillegra Dam Group was formed to prevent the building of the dam. Opponents claimed the dam proposal was grossly excessive for need, will drown valuable agricultural land and greater water efficiency, demand management and recycling would eliminate the need for the dam.

== Cancellation ==
On 28 November 2010. Premier Kristina Keneally announced the cancellation of the dam after the Planning Minister refused to approve it. The refusal was based on both the potential for environmental damage and the lack of proper consideration of alternative water security measures. The state government had already spent $100 million on the project.

== Statistics ==
- Height of dam wall: 80 m (262 ft)
- Length of dam wall: 800 m (2,625 ft)
- Surface area: 21 km^{2} (8.1 sq mi)
- Length of lake: 10 km (6 mi)
- Total capacity: 450 gigalitres
- Average flow of Williams River: 94 gigalitres per annum.
- Estimated Cost: A$477 million (as of April 2010)
