= Nelsons Plains, New South Wales =

Nelsons Plains New South Wales
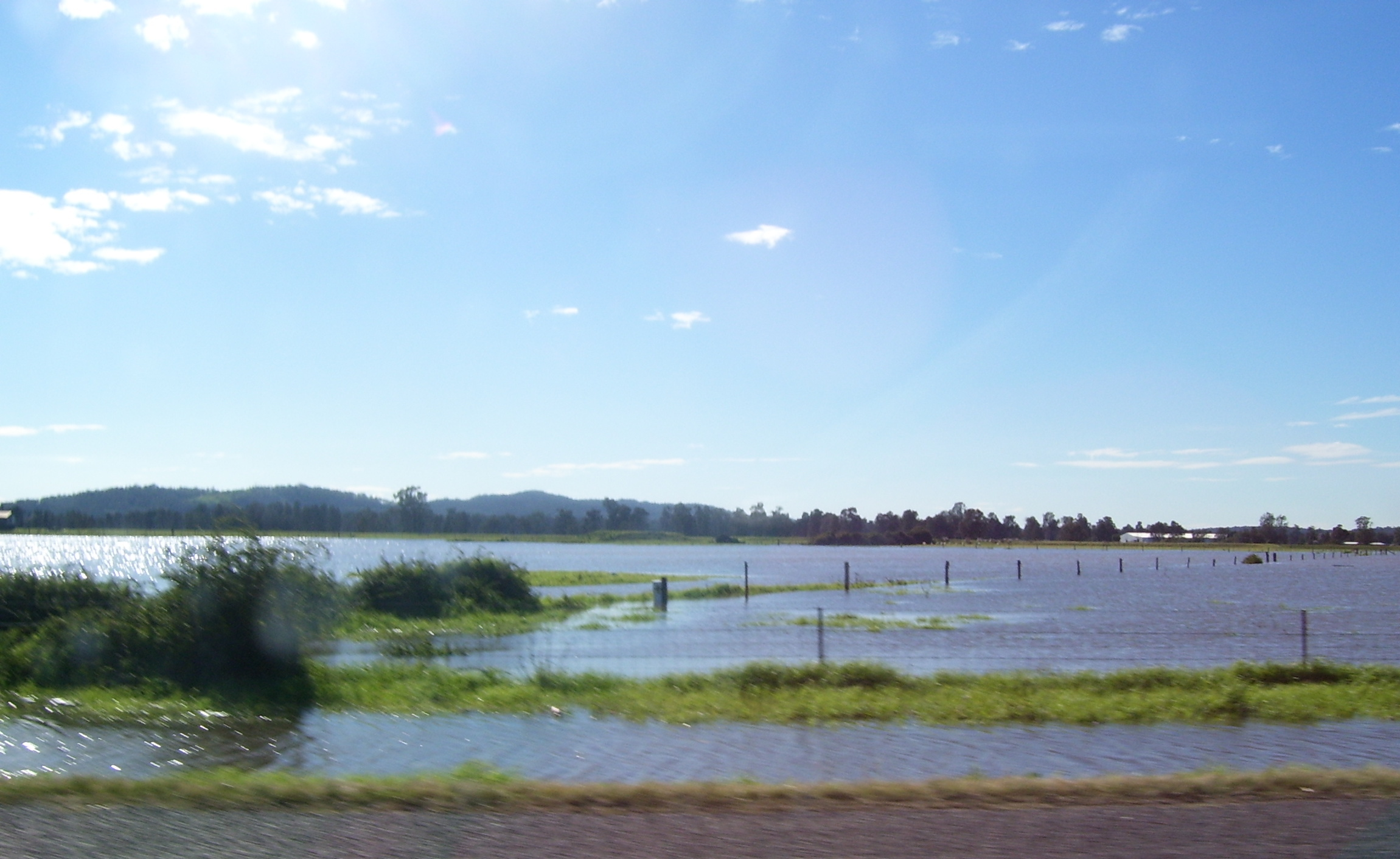
- Flooding at Nelsons Plains in 2007

- Coordinates: 32°42′54″S 151°43′04″E
- Population: 326 (SAL 2021)
  - Density: 16.4/km^{2} (42/sq mi)
- Postcode(s): 2324
- Elevation: 2 m (7 ft) (Note: Elevations as shown on 1:100000 map 9232 NEWCASTLE.)
- Area: 19.8 km^{2} (7.6 sq mi) (Note: Area calculation is based on 1:100000 map 9232 NEWCASTLE.)
- Time zone: AEST (UTC+10)
  - Summer (DST): AEDT (UTC+11)
- Location: 173 km (107 mi) N of Sydney; 34 km (21 mi) NNW of Newcastle; 0 km (0 mi) NW of Raymond Terrace
- LGA(s): Port Stephens Council
- Region: Hunter
- County: Durham
- Parish: Seaham
- State electorate(s): Port Stephens
- Federal division(s): Lyne
Suburbs around Nelsons Plains:
Brandy Hill	Seaham	Eagleton
Seaham, Osterley	Nelsons Plains	Raymond Terrace
Millers Forest	Millers Forest	Raymond Terrace

Nelsons Plains is a primarily rural suburb of the Port Stephens local government area in the Hunter Region of New South Wales, Australia. It is situated on Seaham Road between the Hunter and Williams rivers. At the 2016 census the suburb had a population of 362.

== Geography ==
Nelsons Plains is a wedge-shaped suburb, bisected by Seaham Road, with the point of the wedge in the south-eastern corner where the Williams River joins the Hunter River. This part of the suburb is generally less than 2 metres (7 ft) above river level, making it subject to periodic flooding, as happened during the June 2007 Hunter Region and Central Coast storms. In the north-eastern corner of the suburb elevations reach up to 42 m (138 ft) but to the east of Seaham Road, between the road and the Williams River, the ground slopes quickly downward to a height of less than 2 m (7 ft) above river level, making this part of the suburb also subject to flooding.

== Demographics ==
At the 2016 census the population was 362, with a median age of 41 and 89.6% of the population spoke only English at home. Australian born residents represented 88.8%, with 2.0% born in New Zealand and 0.8% in England. For religion, 31.4% identified as Anglican, 28.3% as Catholic, 18.9% as having no religion, 7.5% did not state a religion and 5.8% belonging to the Uniting Church.

Flooding of the Hunter and Williams rivers west of Raymond Terrace at Nelsons Plains in 2007

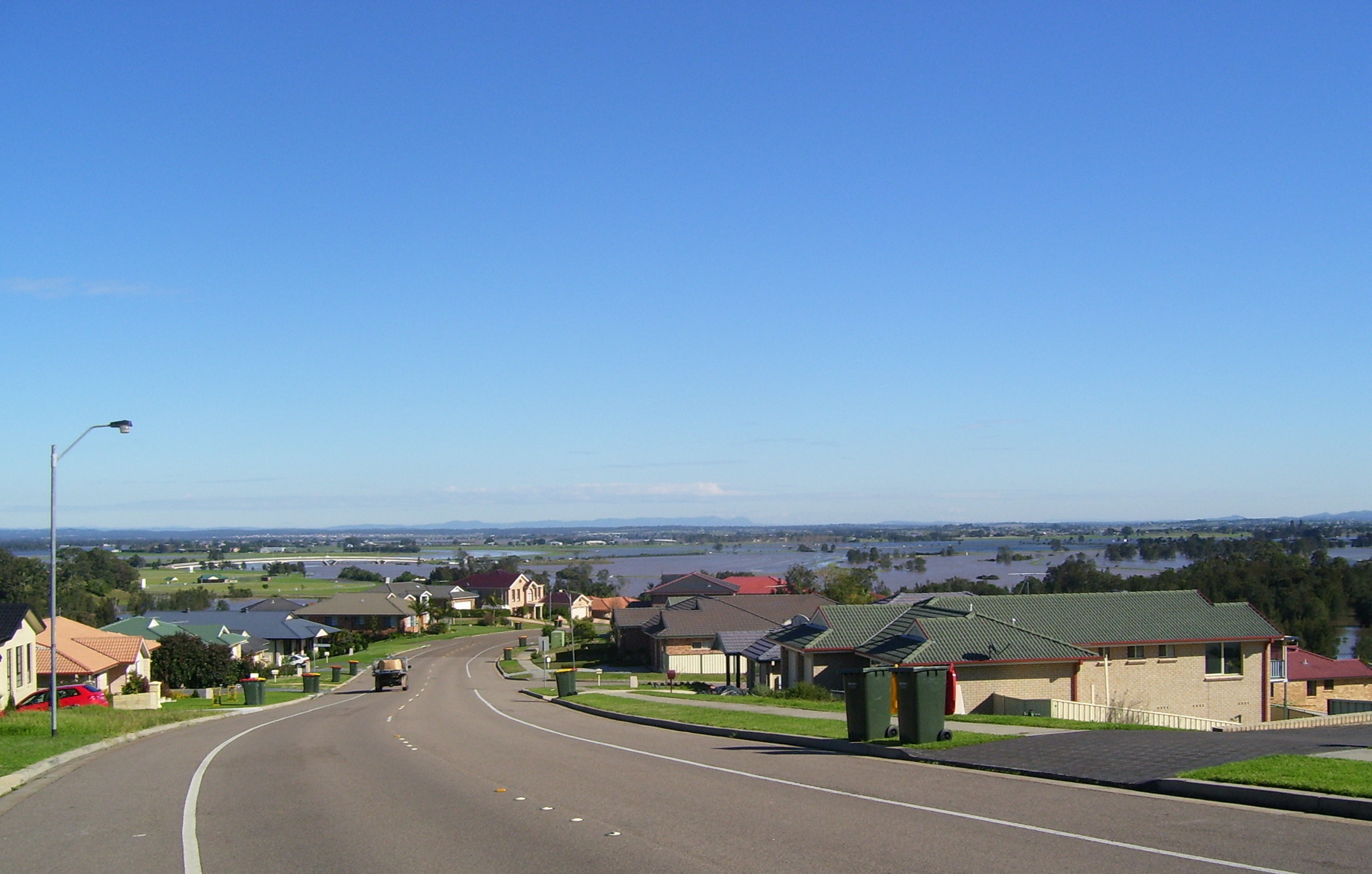
View from the top of Beaton Avenue in Raymond Terrace, looking west.

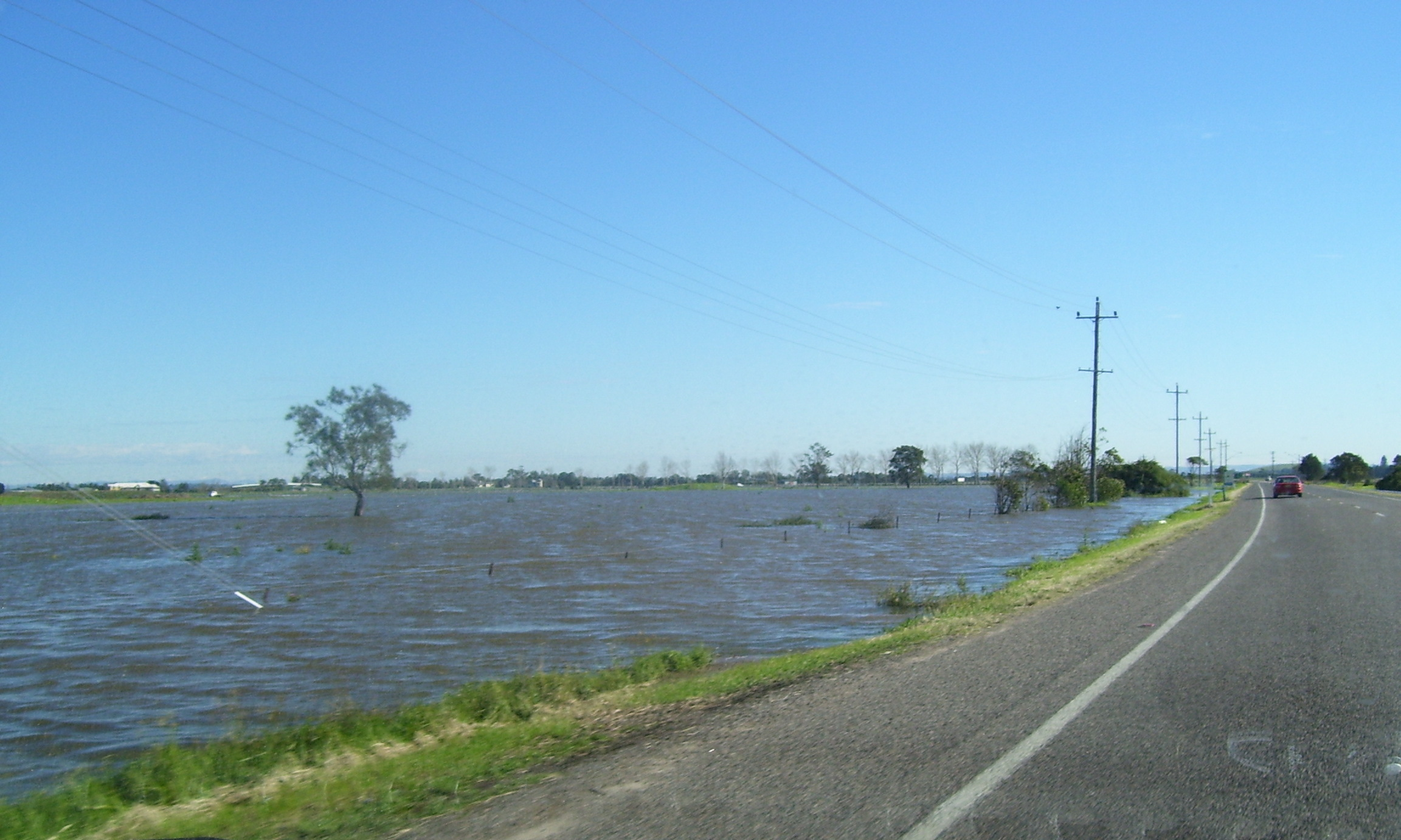
View from Seaham Road, looking to the (roughly) west.

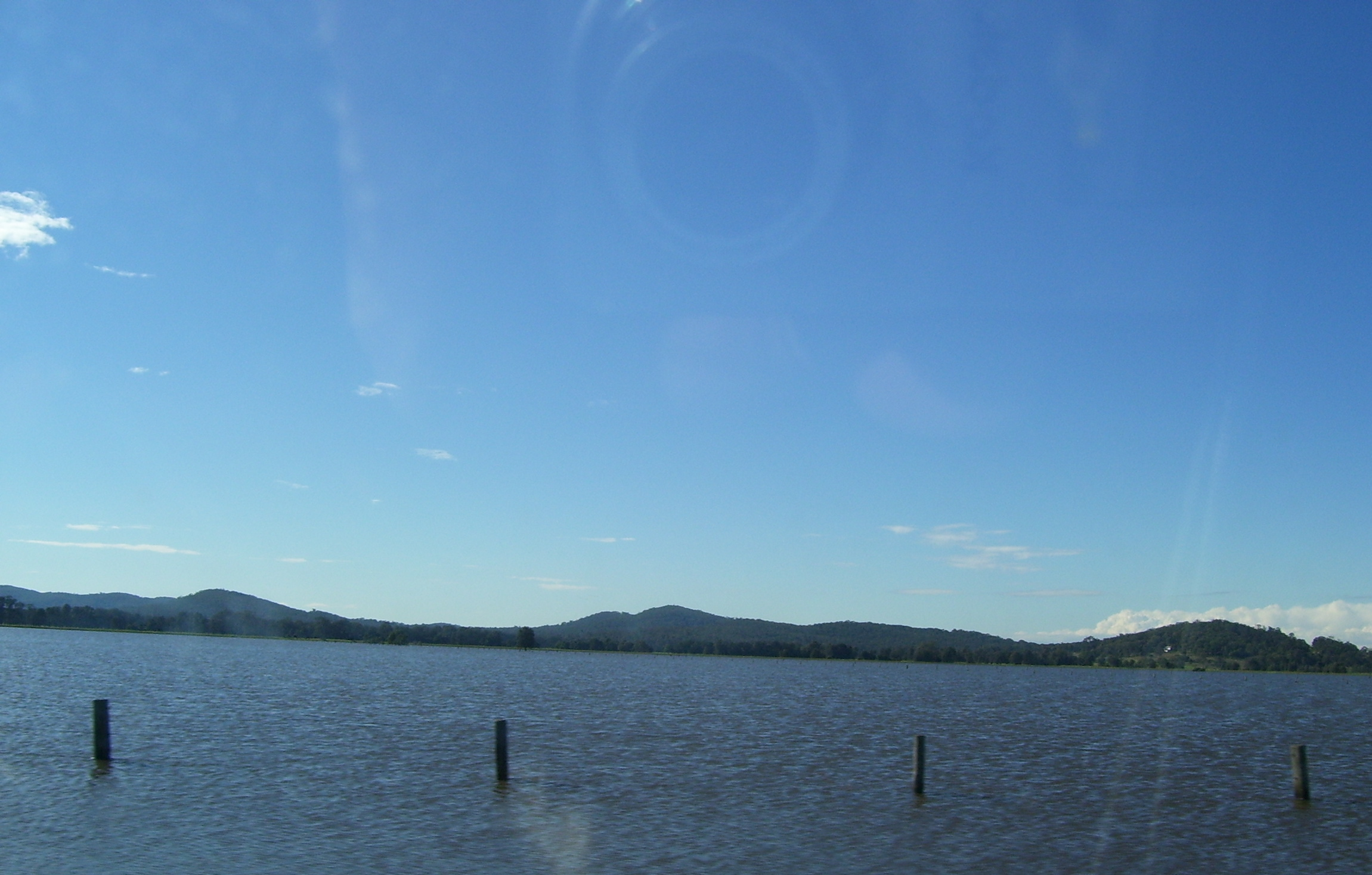
View from Seaham Road, looking to the east.
