= Hunter River High School =

Location
- Elkin Avenue, Heatherbrae, south of Raymond Terrace, Hunter Region, New South Wales; Australia
- Coordinates: 32°46′54″S 151°43′58″E

Information
- Former name: Raymond Terrace High School
- Type: Government-funded co-educational comprehensive secondary day school
- Motto: French: Essayez (Test yourself)
- Educational authority: New South Wales Department of Education
- Principal: Sue Xenos
- Teaching staff: 64.7 FTE (2018)
- Years: 7–12
- Enrolment: 816 (2018)
- Campus: Suburban
- Colours: Blue, white and green
- Slogan: Quality Relationships – Quality Learning
- Website: hunterriv-h.schools.nsw.gov.au

Hunter River High School is a government-funded co-educational comprehensive secondary day school, located adjacent to the Hunter River, in Heatherbrae, south of Raymond Terrace, in the Hunter Region of New South Wales, Australia.

Established as Raymond Terrace High School, the school enrolled approximately 800 students in 2018, from Year 7 to Year 12, of whom 19 percent identified as Indigenous Australians and four percent were from a language background other than English. The school is operated by the NSW Department of Education; the principal is Sue Xenos.

The school's traditional motto appears on the school's crest and is in French: Essayez, translated as "Test yourself". The school's second motto, or slogan, is "Quality Relationships – Quality Learning".

== See also ==
- List of government schools in New South Wales: G–P
- Education in Australia
- Irrawang High School
