= Grahamstown Dam =

- Location of the Grahamstown Dam in New South Wales
- Interactive map of Grahamstown Dam
- Country: Australia
- Location: Ferodale, New South Wales
- Coordinates: 32°44′S 151°49′E
- Purpose: Water supply
- Status: Operational
- Construction began: 1955
- Opening date: 1969
- Owner: Hunter Water

Dam and spillways
- Type of dam: Embankment dam
- Impounds: Off-stream
- Height: 12 metres (39 ft)
- Length: 4.8 km (3 mi)
- Dam volume: 2,124 m^{3} (75,008 cu ft)
- Spillways: 1
- Spillway type: Controlled labyrinth spillway and baffle chute
- Spillway capacity: 800 cubic metres per second (28,000 cu ft/s)

Reservoir
- Creates: Grahamstown Lake
- Total capacity: 190,000 megalitres (6,700×10^{6} cu ft)
- Catchment area: 97 km^{2} (37 sq mi)
- Surface area: 2,460 ha (6,079 acres)
- Website; Hunter Water

Grahamstown Dam is a major off-stream earthfill Embankment dam with a controlled labyrinth spillway and baffle chute that stores water from the Williams River. The dam is located north of Newcastle, New South Wales, Australia. The dam's main purpose is water supply; it provides about 40 per cent of the potable water for the Hunter Region; and is its largest drinking water supply dam.

The impounded reservoir is called Grahamstown Lake or the Grahamstown Storage Reservoir.

== Location and features ==
Grahamstown Dam is immediately adjacent to residential areas in the town of Raymond Terrace, less than 4 km (2.5 mi) from the Raymond Terrace CBD.

Grahamstown Dam is a major dam that receives its main inflow from the Williams River as well as its own catchment. Water flows into the Grahamstown Dam from the Williams River, upstream from the Seaham Weir, which limits the inflow of tidal seawater; via Balickera Canal and pumping station, which are used to transfer water from the Williams River to Grahamstown Dam. The Campvale Pumping Station; George Schroder Pumping Station and delivery mains are used to deliver water from the dam to the water treatment plant; and Grahamstown Water Treatment Plant.

The storage was formed by building an embankment across the outlet of a natural depression known as the Grahamstown Moors. Construction began in 1955, and although all the elements of the entire scheme were not completed until 1965, water was first supplied in 1960 during the severe drought from 1960 to 1963. The dam was built by the NSW Water Conservation and Irrigation Commission on behalf of the Hunter Water Corporation to supply water to the Hunter Region.

The dam wall consists of 2,124 cubic metres (75,000 cu ft) of earthfill with an internal earth core. It is 12 m (39 ft) high and 4.8 km (3 mi) long. At 100% capacity the dam wall holds back 190,000 megalitres (6,700×10^{6} cu ft) of water. The surface area of Grahamstown Lake is 2,460 ha (6,079 acres) and the catchment area is a relatively small 97 km^{2} (37 sq mi). The controlled labyrinth spillway is capable of discharging 800 cubic metres per second (28,000 cu ft/s).

=== Upgrade of facilities ===
Since the dam was completed, major modifications include:

- 1973: a bentonite clay core 2.02 km (1.3 mi) in length was installed in the central section of the embankment to provide a watertight seal, the 1.5 m (5 ft) thick core has an average depth of 21.3 m (70 ft);
- 1985: the Full Supply Level of the dam was reduced from 11.1 m (36.4 ft) to 10.6 m (34.8 ft) as a temporary measure to reduce the risk of damage to the main embankment from major flooding;
- 1994: further work was undertaken to raise the level of the clay core to road level over the full length of the embankment and rock armouring of the main embankment was also undertaken; and
- 2005: the Full Supply Level was increased to 12.8 m (42 ft) and provided 50 per cent more storage capacity by constructing a spillway northeast of Raymond Terrace and a new discharge channel under the Pacific Highway.

=== Criticism ===
At the time of the proposal for the construction of a dam at Tillegra, it was claimed that Hunter Water Corporation deliberately allowed the water storage levels in Grahamstown Dam run down in order to inflate the case for the A$477 million Tillegra project.

== See also ==
- Irrigation in Australia
- List of dams and reservoirs in New South Wales
