= Gentleman John Smith =

Convict

Gentleman John Smith was an English man who was convicted and imprisoned for theft before being transported to Australia as a convict, twice. In Australia he later became a police official, serving as chief constable of Newcastle in New South Wales.

== Early life ==
He was born James sidbottom in Manchester in 1787. At 20, he was arrested for stealing stocking and sentenced to seven years transportation. it is not known how he travelled back to London but he is again arrested and In 1809 he took the name John Smith.

== Convict life ==
He was sent to prison hulks at Portsmouth on 18 December 1809. He traveled on the ship Indian which arrived in Port Jackson on 16 December 1810. On 16 December 1811 he was reported as absconding from Eber Bunker at Georges River. He stole and then sold tobacco from a warehouse, but was found not guilty on the lesser charge of stealing from a warehouse. In 1861, he was accused of lighting a fire to defraud Liverpool and London Fire and Life Insurance Company.

He went to Newcastle for penal settlement. He was sent on the Lady Nelson from Parramatta on 8 July 1815. In 1817 he was appointed Chief Constable of Newcastle.

== Maitland ==
In 1818 he was one of the first convicts to occupy a farm at Wallis Plains (East Maitland). He owned various properties including a stream flour mill, Caroline Chisholm cottage ( which was originally used as staff quarters for the flour mill. Then given to Caroline to use as an hospital for women.)and the Black Horse Inn there.

== Personal life ==
On 11 July 1814 he married Mary Furber. He became a father to Mary's three-year-old, George, and together they had eight more children: James (1815), Sophia (1816), Eliza (1817), Mary Ann (1818), John Thomas (1819), Matilda (1820) William Henry (1821). Alfred Sydney (1837)

In 1838 he purchased 28 acres of land in the Fullerton Cove called Stanley Park to fulfill a contract from the military to supply beef.

Smith died in 1870 and is buried in Christ Church burial ground.
