= Eagleton, New South Wales =

Eagleton New South Wales
- Coordinates: 32.6957°S 151.7766°E
- Population: 211 (2016 census)
- Postcode(s): 2324
- Time zone: AEST (UTC+10)
  - Summer (DST): AEDT (UTC+11)
- LGA(s): Port Stephens Council
- Region: Hunter
- County: Gloucester
- State electorate(s): Port Stephens
- Federal division(s): Paterson

Eagleton is a rural residential suburb in the Hunter Region of New South Wales, Australia. It is within the Port Stephens local government area.

== Demographic ==
In the 2016 census, Eagleton had 211 permanent residents with a median age of 49. 50.5% of the population were male, and 49.5% were female. Australian, English, Irish, Scottish, and German were the most represented cultures.

== Eagleton Creamery ==
The Eagleton Creamery was established in September 1892. It officially opened as Eagleton Co-operative Creamery Co in October 1892. It did daily deliveries of cream to Ireland's Creamery and Refrigerating Works at Newcastle to make into butter. On 1 July 1897, the company decided go into voluntary liquidation and cease operation
