= Raymond Terrace =

- Town
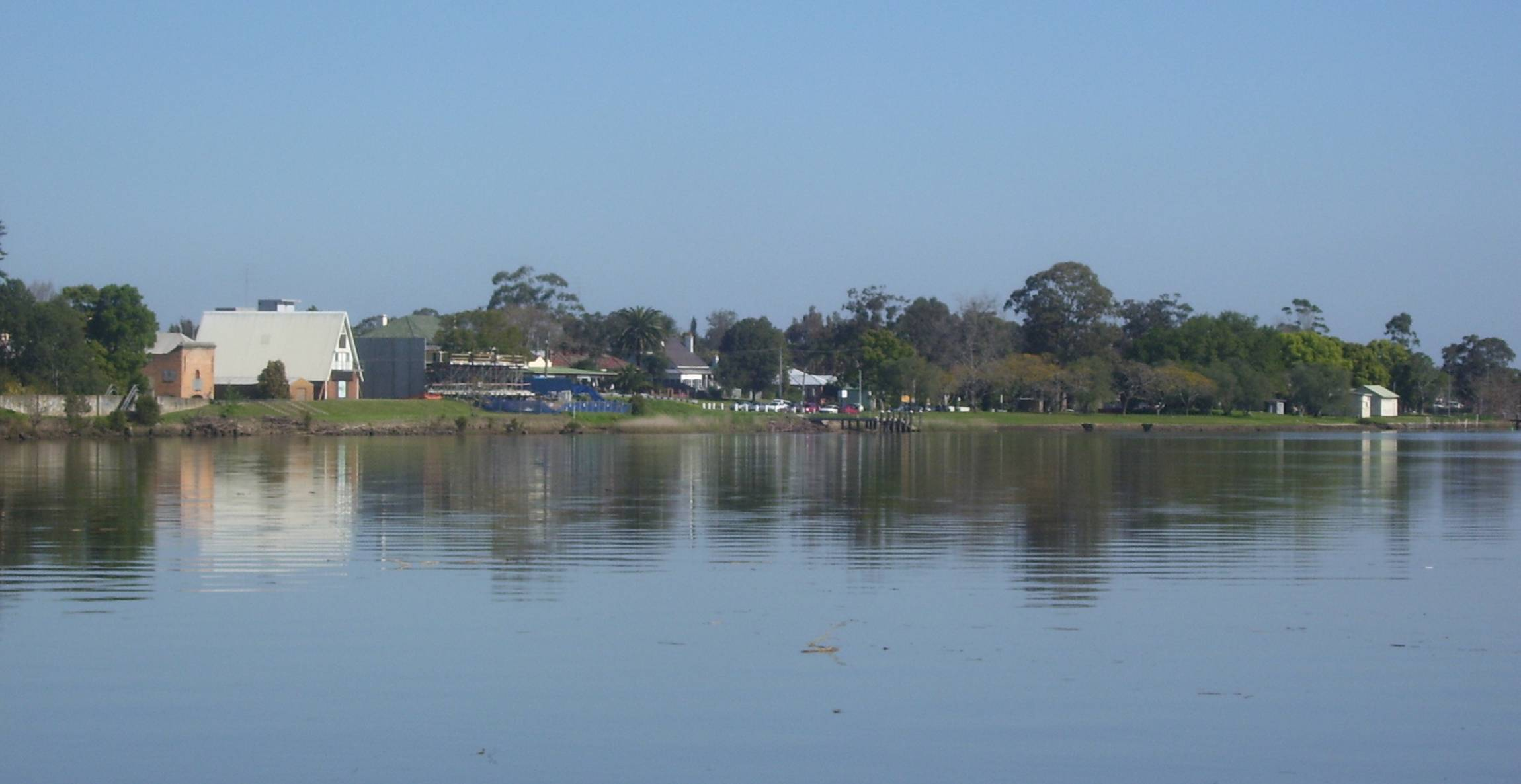
- Raymond Terrace foreshore from the Fitzgerald Bridge

- Interactive map of Raymond Terrace
- Coordinates: 32°45′41.3″S 151°44′38.6″E
- Country: Australia
- State: New South Wales
- Region: Hunter
- LGA: Port Stephens Council
- Location: 168 km (104 mi) NNE of Sydney; 25.8 km (16.0 mi) N of Newcastle; 51 km (32 mi) S of Dungog; 45 km (28 mi) WSW of Nelson Bay
- Established: 1837

Government
  - State electorates: Port Stephens; Maitland
  - Federal division: Paterson

Area (Note: Area calculation is based on 1:100000 map 9232 NEWCASTLE.)
  - Total: 39.7 km^{2} (15.3 sq mi)
- Elevation (Note: Raymond Terrace is primarily flat however it does have some elevated areas. The figure presented represents the average elevation in the most populous area of the town as shown in 1:100000 map 9232 NEWCASTLE.): 6 m (20 ft)

Population
  - Total: 13,453 (2021 census) (Note: This is the population figure for most of the suburb. It excludes residents living on two properties to the west of Newline Road in the north of the suburb. These are included in the ABS figures for Eagleton)
  - Density: 338.87/km^{2} (877.7/sq mi) (Note: This is the population density for the entire suburb, which includes rural areas around the town. The population density for the actual township, which covers an area of only 10.6 km^{2} (4.1 sq mi) is considerably higher.)
- Time zone: UTC+10 (AEST)
  - Summer (DST): UTC+11 (AEDT)
- Postcode: 2324
- County: Gloucester
- Parish: Eldon
Localities around Raymond Terrace
Seaham, Nelsons Plains	Eagleton	Ferodale
Nelsons Plains, Millers Forest	Raymond Terrace	Ferodale, Campvale, Williamtown
Millers Forest	Heatherbrae, Tomago	Williamtown

Raymond Terrace, locally known as "The Terrace", is a town in the Hunter Region of New South Wales, Australia, about 26 km (16 mi) by road north of Newcastle on the Pacific Highway. Established in 1837 it is situated at the confluence of the Hunter and Williams rivers. The town was named after Lieutenant Raymond, who had explored the Hunter River in 1797 and described the terraced appearance of trees in the area. Governor Lachlan Macquarie camped in the area in 1818, using "Raymond's Terrace" as the name for the place where his party had camped.

At the 2021 census Raymond Terrace had a population of 13,453. It is the administrative centre of the Port Stephens local government area as well as a service hub for surrounding rural areas.

== Geography ==
Raymond Terrace is situated to the east of the Hunter and Williams rivers and consists of three distinct regions. The north and south regions are primarily rural/semi-rural and occupy approximately 74% of the town's land with only 3% of the population living in these areas. Most of the population lives in the town itself.

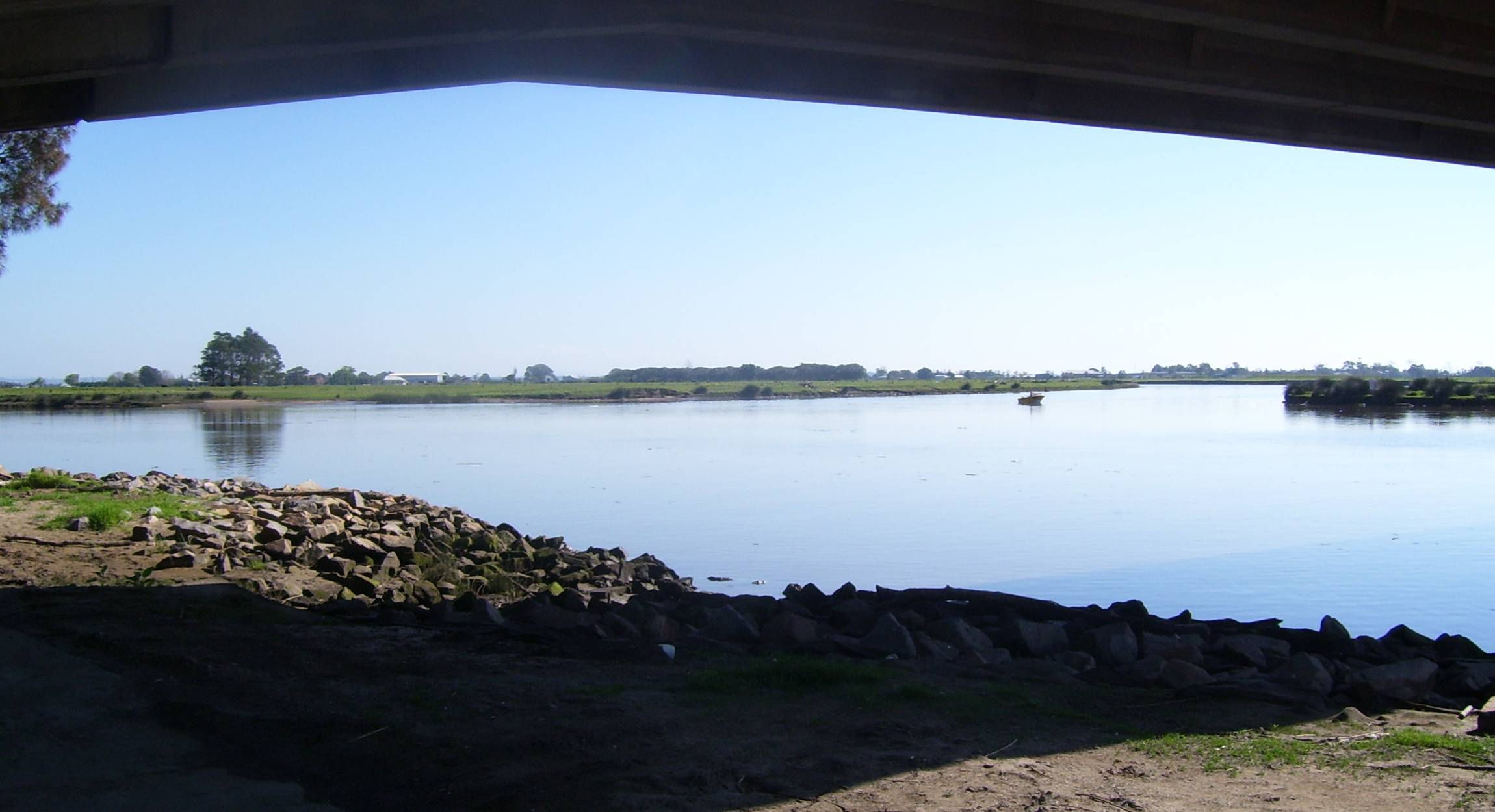
Confluence of the Hunter and Williams rivers

The centre of the town, where the shopping district is located, is adjacent to the Hunter River, just south of the confluence of the two rivers. Access to the northern sides of the rivers is via the Fitzgerald Bridge which crosses the Williams River immediately adjacent to and upstream of the confluence. When the Hunter River is in flood, access beyond the Fitzgerald Bridge to the northern side of the Williams River (i.e. to Nelsons Plains) is often not possible due to its low-lying nature. The town of Raymond Terrace is mostly protected by levee banks and other flood mitigation devices. However, some lower parts of the town still flood, as happened during the 2007 New South Wales storms.

In December 1998 a diversion of the Pacific Highway opened diverting traffic from the town centre. Most of the town now lies to the north-west of the bypass between the Hunter and Williams rivers. However, the suburb of Lakeside lies to the east of the bypass, between the bypass and the wall of Grahamstown Dam.

=== Climate ===
Raymond Terrace experiences a humid subtropical climate (Köppen: Cfa/Cfb, Trewartha: Cfbl/Cfal); with warm summers and mild winters; and with a moderately high precipitation amount of 1,143.4 millimetres (45.04 in), with moderate precipitation even during its drier months.

Climate data for Raymond Terrace, New South Wales, Australia (temperature 1938–1969, precipitation 1938–2006); 75 m AMSL
Month	Jan	Feb	Mar	Apr	May	Jun	Jul	Aug	Sep	Oct	Nov	Dec	Year
Mean daily maximum °C (°F)	28.3 (82.9)	27.8 (82.0)	26.5 (79.7)	23.0 (73.4)	19.8 (67.6)	17.1 (62.8)	16.4 (61.5)	18.0 (64.4)	21.2 (70.2)	23.7 (74.7)	26.2 (79.2)	28.0 (82.4)	23.0 (73.4)
Daily mean °C (°F)	22.3 (72.1)	22.1 (71.8)	20.7 (69.3)	17.0 (62.6)	13.6 (56.5)	11.5 (52.7)	10.0 (50.0)	11.4 (52.5)	14.0 (57.2)	17.0 (62.6)	19.3 (66.7)	21.3 (70.3)	16.7 (62.0)
Mean daily minimum °C (°F)	16.3 (61.3)	16.4 (61.5)	14.8 (58.6)	11.0 (51.8)	7.4 (45.3)	5.8 (42.4)	3.6 (38.5)	4.8 (40.6)	6.7 (44.1)	10.2 (50.4)	12.4 (54.3)	14.6 (58.3)	10.3 (50.6)
Average precipitation mm (inches)	124.6 (4.91)	120.1 (4.73)	136.8 (5.39)	100.0 (3.94)	99.7 (3.93)	118.7 (4.67)	63.4 (2.50)	68.1 (2.68)	58.7 (2.31)	79.7 (3.14)	83.0 (3.27)	90.6 (3.57)	1,143.4 (45.04)
Average precipitation days (≥ 1.0 mm)	8.0	8.2	9.1	7.4	7.9	7.6	6.2	6.2	6.1	7.3	7.6	7.0	88.6
Source: Bureau of Meteorology (temperature 1938–1969, precipitation 1938–2006)

== Demographics ==
According to the 2021 census, there were 13,453 people in Raymond Terrace.

Historical population
Year	Pop.	±%
1921	891	—
1933	918	+3.0%
1947		—
1954	2,726	—
1961	3,962	+45.3%
1966	4,955	+25.1%
1971	6,086	+22.8%
1976	6,989	+14.8%
1981	7,548	+8.0%
1986	8,793	+16.5%
1991	11,159	+26.9%
1996	12,332	+10.5%
2001	12,482	+1.2%
2006	12,700	+1.7%
2011	13,217	+4.1%
2016	13,302	+0.6%
2021	14,081	+5.9%
Source: Australian Bureau of Statistics data.

== Services ==
=== Emergency services ===
All emergency service providers are represented in the town. In 2010 the police station was temporarily relocated to the site of the old Raymond Terrace Leisure Centre while a new station was being constructed on the site of the old station in William Street. The Fire & Rescue New South Wales fire station is located at the eastern edge of the town in Leisure Way, adjacent to Grahamstown Dam, while the New South Wales Ambulance ambulance station is located on Adelaide Street (old Pacific Highway), a short distance from the centre of the town. The New South Wales Rural Fire Service and State Emergency Service share a facility located North of the town between Rees James Road and the Pacific Highway. The nearest hospitals are the Calvary Mater and John Hunter hospitals in Newcastle to the southwest and Maitland Hospital in Maitland, to the northwest. All three are approximately 20–30 minutes driving time from the town.

=== Education ===
The town has four primary schools, St Brigid's Catholic, Raymond Terrace Public, Irrawang Public and Grahamstown Public, and two high schools, Irrawang High School and Hunter River High School, formerly known as Raymond Terrace High School.

=== Commerce and industry ===
There are two main shopping centres in the town centre which is based around William Street. The Raymond Terrace Marketplace (also commonly referred to as “the new shopping centre”), located north-east of William Street, was opened in 1998 while Terrace Central (formerly Centro Plaza, formerly Raymond Terrace Plaza) is located to the south-west. Both contain supermarkets and a variety of speciality shops and are within a short walking distance of each other on either side of William Street. The Raymond Terrace Marketplace also contains a Big W department store. Shops also line William Street and the adjacent Port Stephens Street and Sturgeon Street. On 29 May 2008 an Aldi supermarket opened at the corner of Port Stephens and Kangaroo streets, bringing the total number of supermarkets in the town to three, all within 600 metres (2,000 ft) of each other. In August 2011, it was announced that the Raymond Terrace Marketplace would be modernised and should be completed by late 2011.

A fleet of prawn trawlers based at Raymond Terrace conducts prawning from Raymond Terrace to Hexham.

=== Transport ===
Raymond Terrace is served by Hunter Valley Buses who operate both a town service and a service to Newcastle Interchange. Hunter Valley Buses operated a depot in Richardson Road until it was closed in 2000 with operations transferred to Thornton. Port Stephens Coaches operate services to Nelson Bay and Sydney. NSW TrainLink road coaches services from Newcastle Interchange to Taree call at Raymond Terrace as do Busways services from Hawks Nest to Newcastle.

== Recreation ==
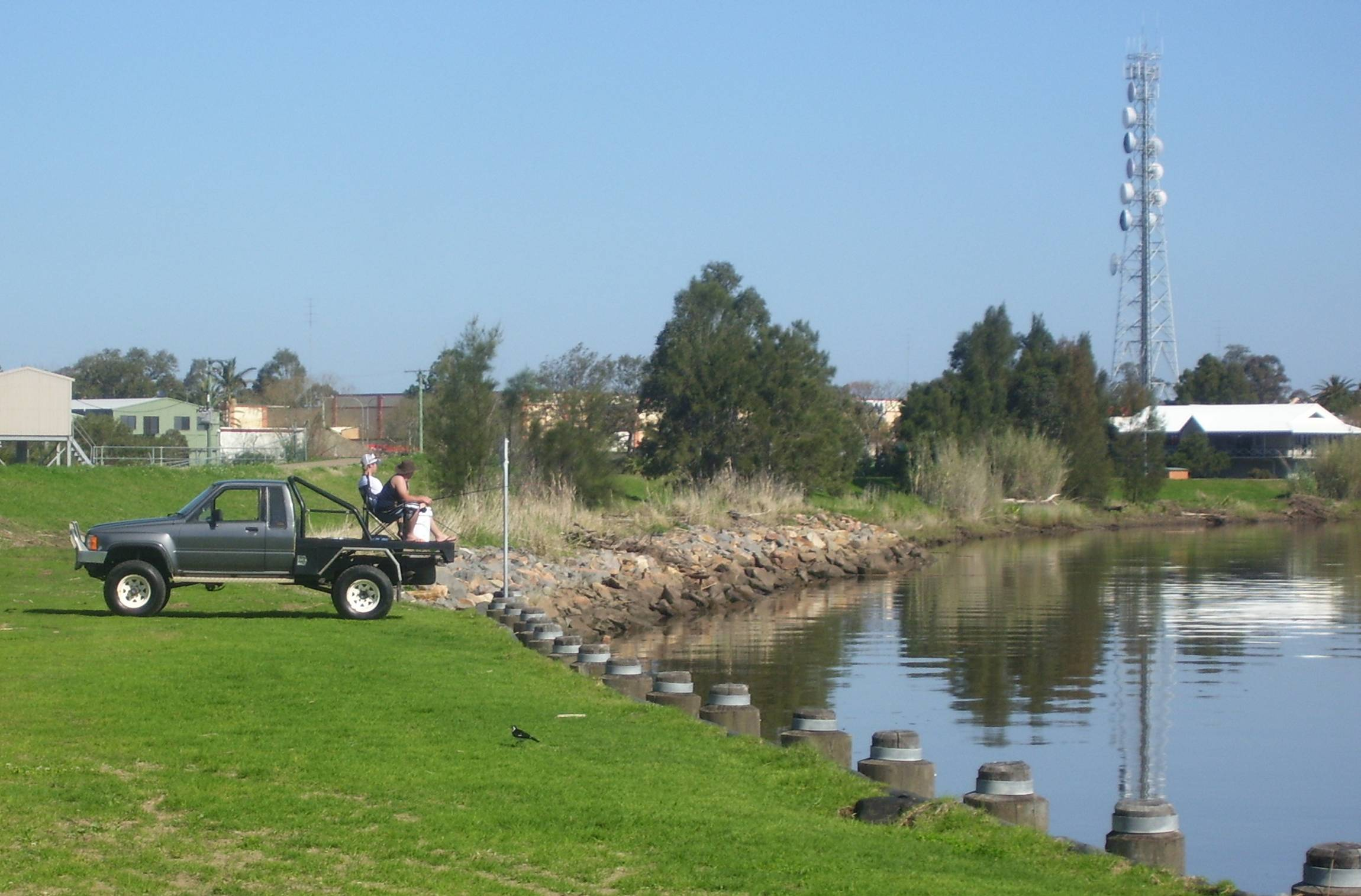
Local residents fishing in the Hunter and Williams rivers at the same time

There are several competitive sporting teams based in the Raymond Terrace area. The Raymond Terrace Magpies are the town's local Rugby League team, participating in the Newcastle Rugby League Competition. The town is represented in cricket by the Port Stephens Pythons in the Newcastle District Cricket Association, and the Raymond Terrace District Cricket Club, a club that participates in the Maitland District Cricket Two Day Competition. Both teams play at the King Park Sporting Complex. Other popular sports within the town are soccer, netball, athletics, golf and lawn bowls.

The Raymond Terrace Jets won the NSW Division One State Pennant in lawn bowls in 2022, defeating Warilla 61–60 in the final. The club is home to ex-Australian representative Matthew Baus and current Australian representatives Natasha van Eldik and Lee Schraner, the latter a dual world singles champion in 2019 and 2024.

There are two licensed clubs, Muree Golf Club and the Raymond Terrace Bowling Club, as well as a number of public bars. The majority of the sporting fields are located near the centre of town, on land that runs along the Williams and Hunter Rivers with other sporting fields located in the suburb of Lakeside, adjacent to Grahamstown Dam.

There is a boat ramp adjacent to the Fitzgerald Bridge, which crosses the Williams River, and the area is popular with water skiers and fisherpeople.

Raymond Terrace foreshore (southwest – northeast)

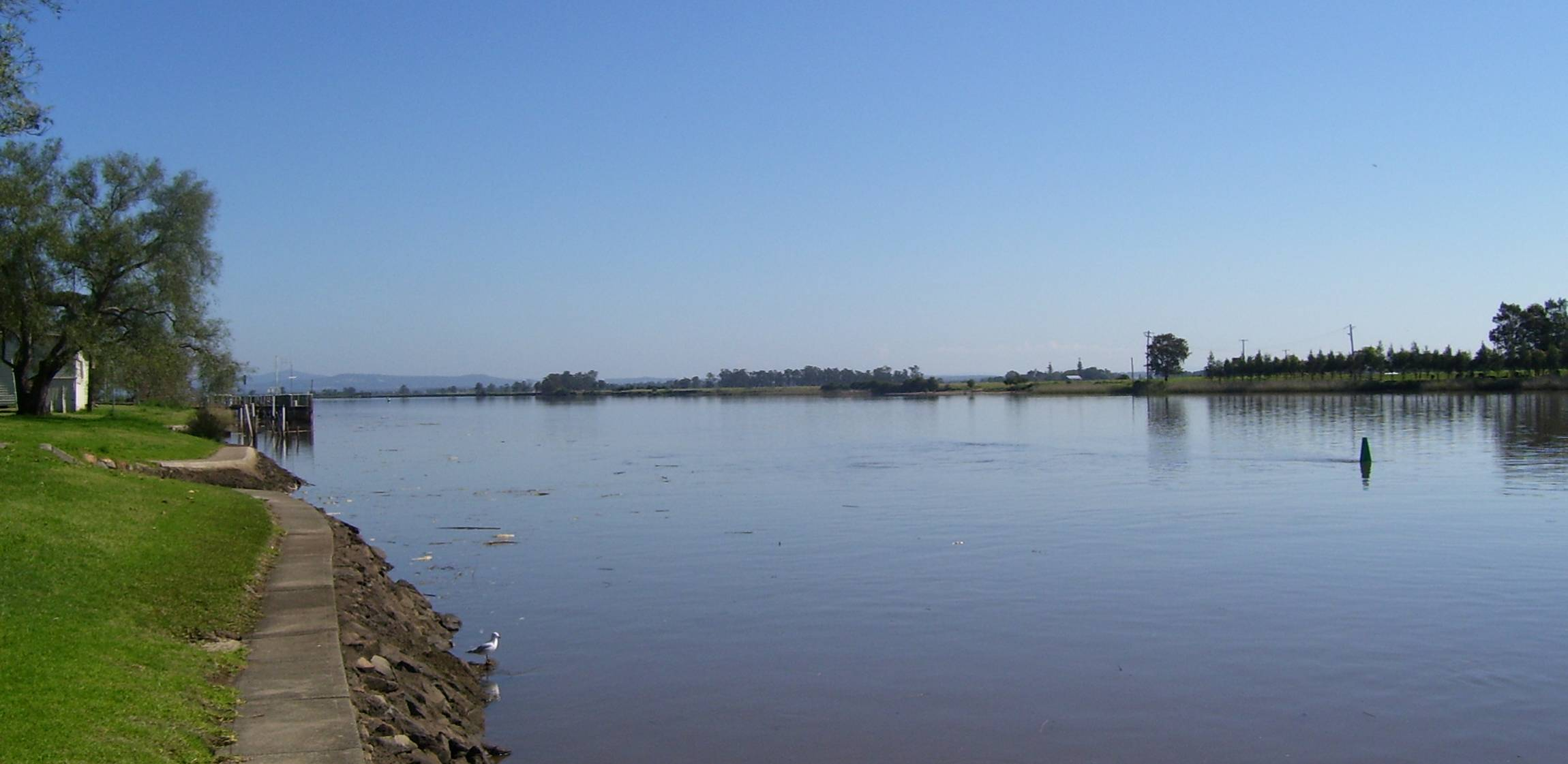
Raymond Terrace foreshore on the Hunter River downstream view

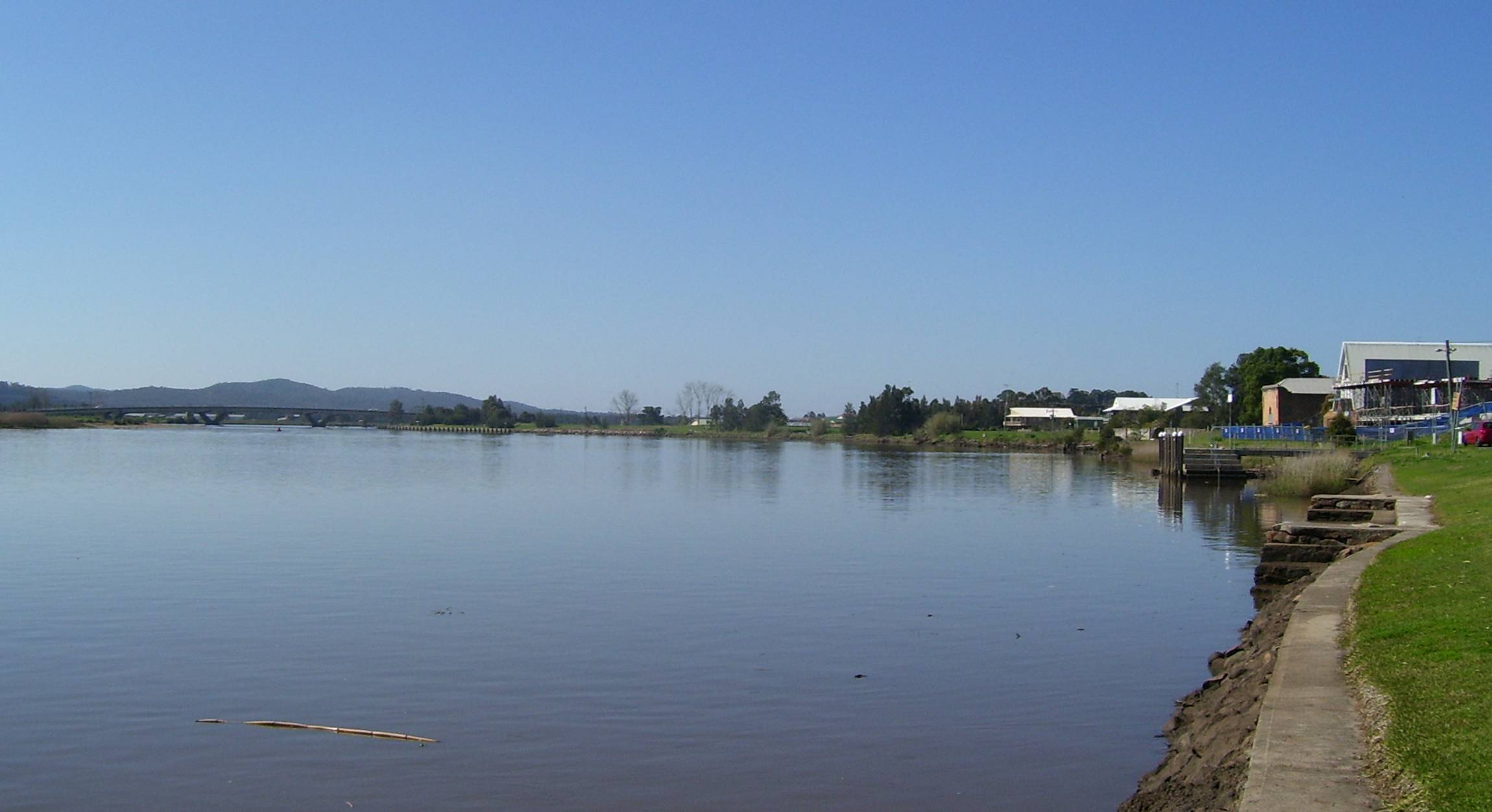
Raymond Terrace foreshore on the Hunter River upstream view showing the Fitzgerald Bridge

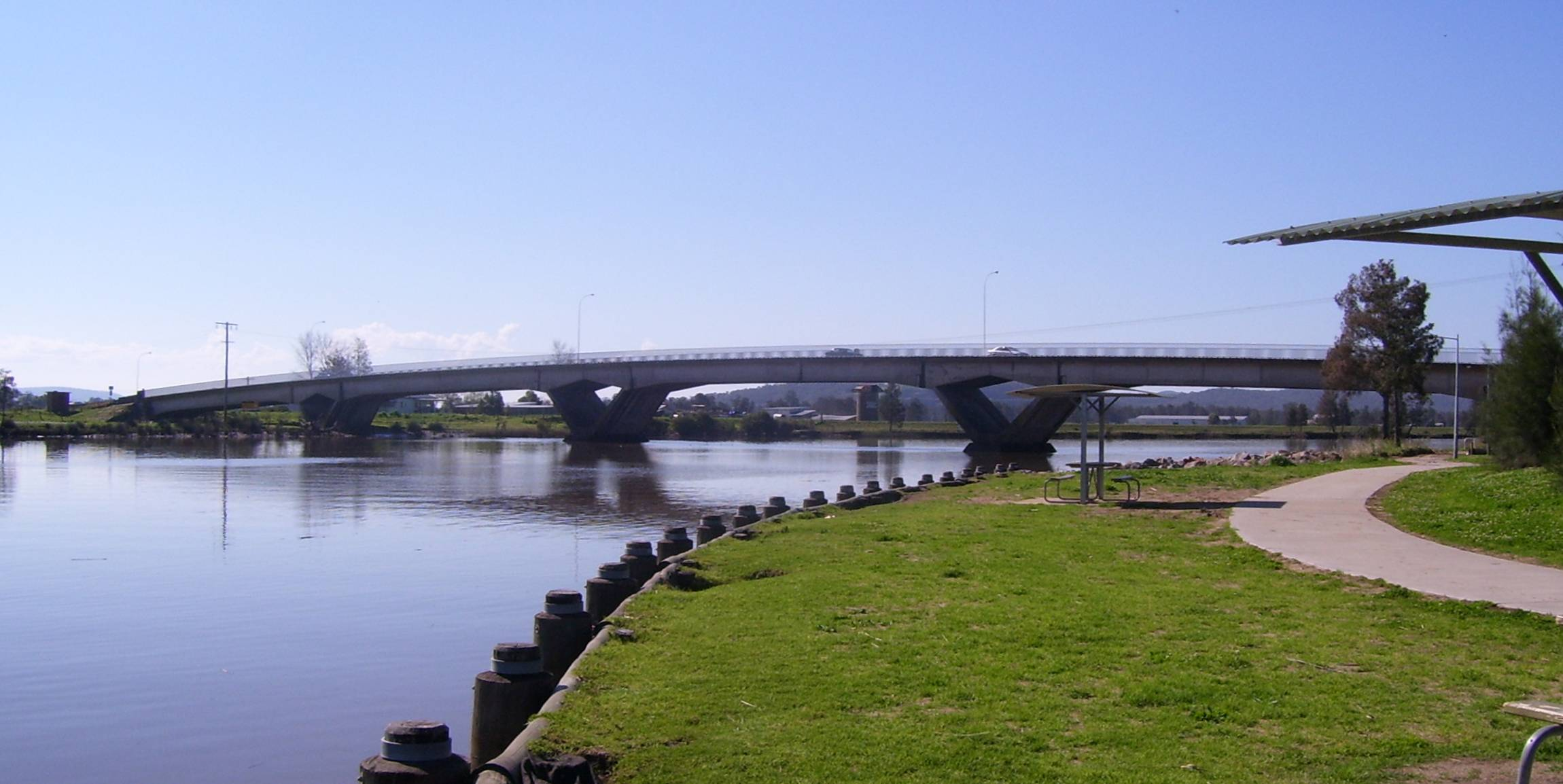
Fitzgerald Bridge over the Williams River

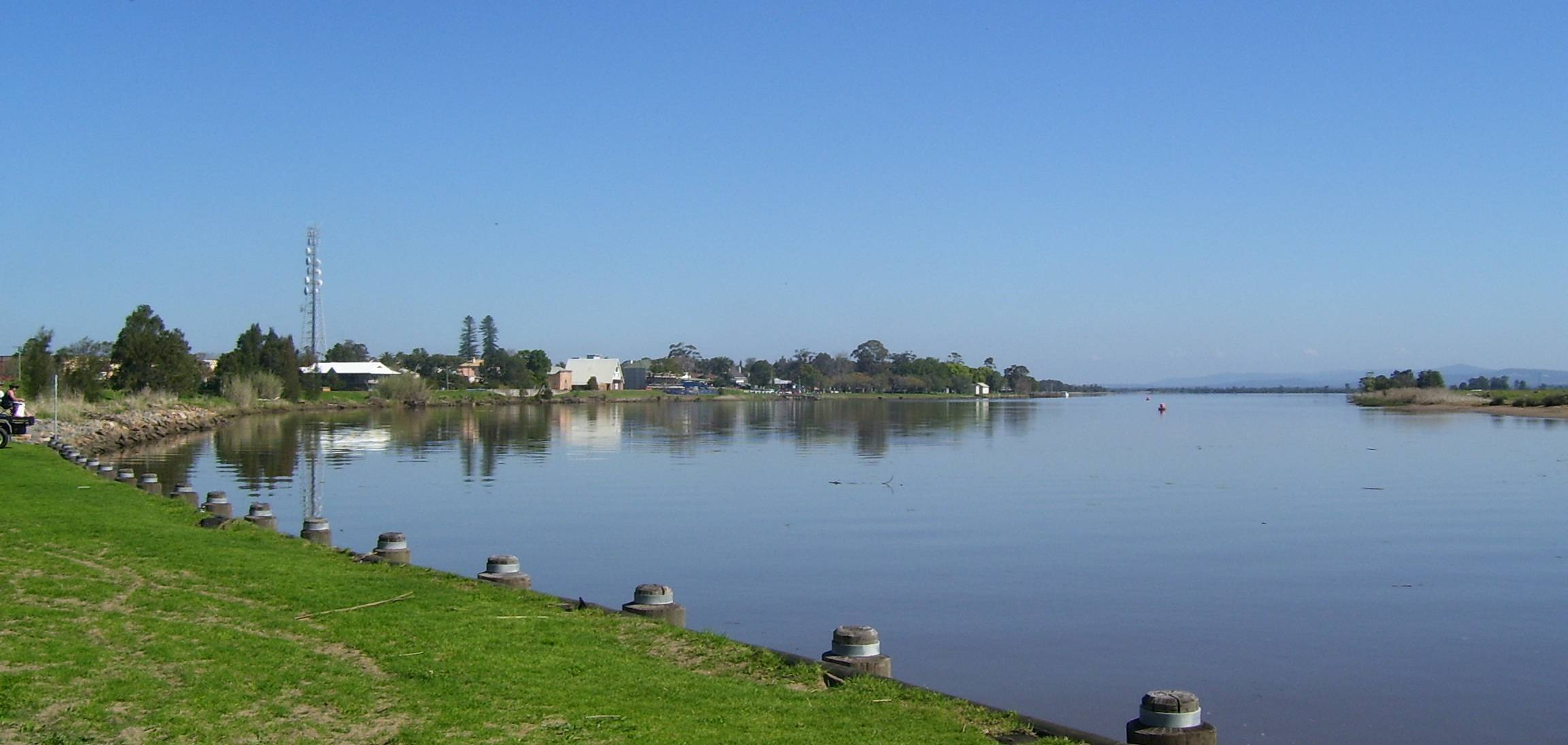
Raymond Terrace foreshore on the Hunter River from the Fitzgerald Bridge (wide view)

== Film set – Tomorrow, When the War Began ==
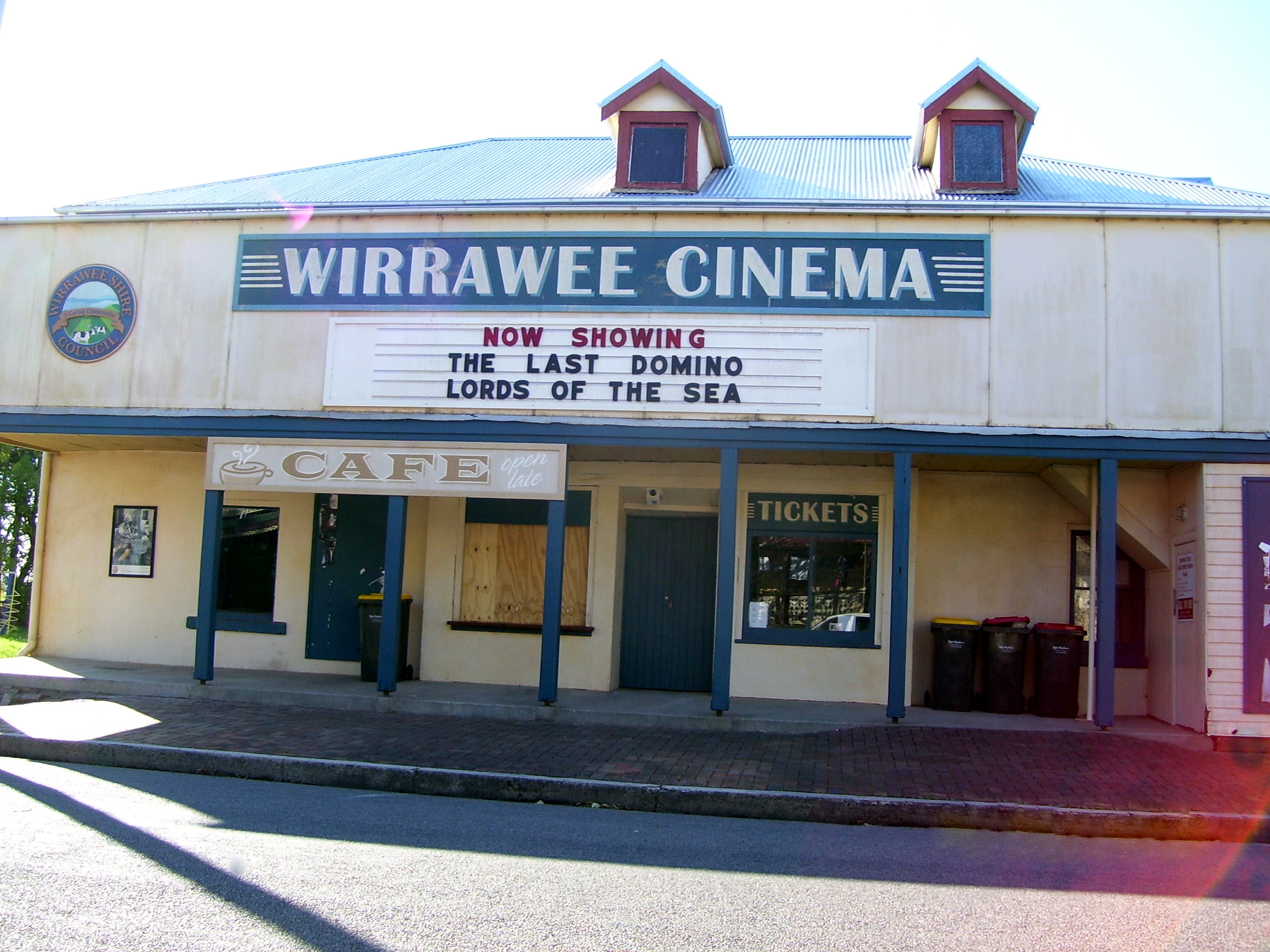
Wirrawee cinema in King Street

In June 2009, Screen Australia announced that it would fund the development of the feature film Tomorrow, When The War Began, based on the John Marsden novel of the same name. Raymond Terrace was chosen as a major location for producing the film as it is "a great country town". Historic King Street, the former main street of the town, was transformed from a normally quiet location into Main Street, Wirrawee. The street began its transformation in September 2009. Set areas included the "Wirrawee Cinema" and the Lee family's Thai restaurant. Filming began in King Street on 21 October 2009 and continued until 27 October 2009. Filming in other locations in the town ended on 6 November 2009.
