= Tuncurry (1903) =

Australian steamship

Coordinates: 33°37.125′S 151°26.422′E

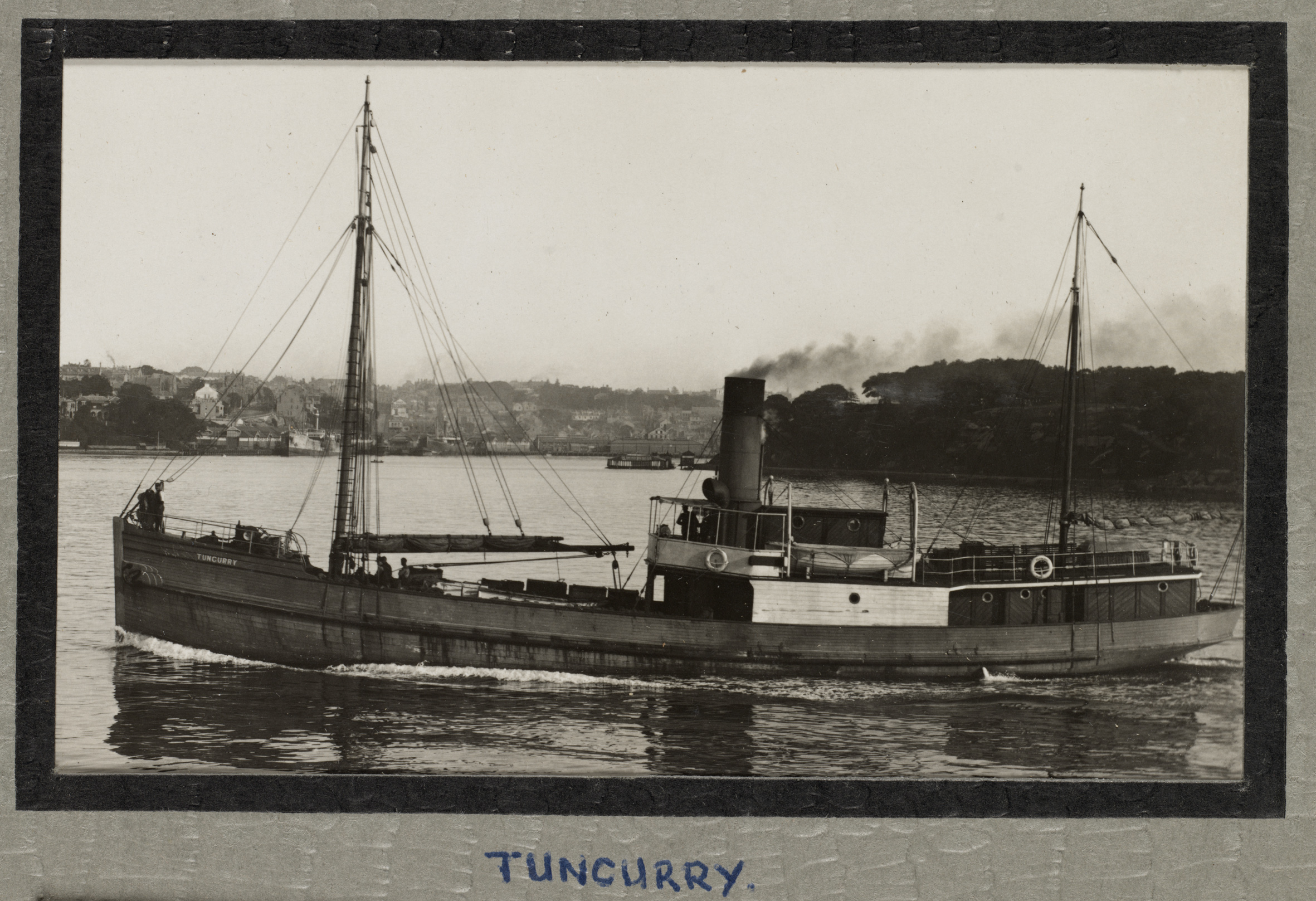
- The Tuncurry in Sydney Harbour

History
- Name: Tuncurry (1903–1909); Tokelau (1909–1916); Tuncurry (1916)
- Owner: Allen Taylor and Co (1903–1909); Western Pacific High Commission(1909–1916); Arthur S. Hasell & Co (1916)
- Port of registry: (Australia) Sydney (1903–1909); (United Kingdom) British (1909–16); (Australia) Sydney (1916)
- Builder: John Wright Cape Hawke, New South Wales, Australia
- Completed: 1903
- Identification: Ship official number 117638; Ship registration number 58/1903; 11 December 1903; Ship registration number 10/1916; 6 September 1916
- Fate: Sank 22 October 1916

General characteristics
- Type: Wood carvel screw steamer
- Tonnage: 158.07 GRT; 71.03 NRT
- Length: 113 ft 5 in (34.57 m)
- Beam: 22 ft 2 in (6.76 m)
- Draught: 2.316 m (7 ft 7.2 in)
- Depth of hold: 7 ft 6 in (2.29 m)
- Decks: 80 ft 0 in (24.38 m)
- Installed power: 33 h.p.
- Propulsion: McKie & Baxter steam engine (Glasgow); Single 4 Blade Screw
- Crew: 10

The Tuncurry was a wooden carvel screw steamer built in 1903 at Cape Hawke in the Australian state of New South Wales, that was wrecked when she sprang a leak whilst carrying explosives, cement, whiskey, jam and other general cargo between Sydney and Brisbane. She was lost off Barrenjoey Head, Broken Bay, New South Wales on 22 October 1916.

== Ship description and construction ==
=== Clarification and disambiguation ===
A vessel with a similar name operated at much the same time and so the Tuncurry ex Tokelau should not be confused with the Tuncurry (1909). which had a long career of at least 40 years and was scuttled on 9 April 1950 off Sydney although some reports say the vessel was burnt in Kerosene Bay in June 1952.

Both vessels were commissioned by the same owner Allen Taylor & Co and built by the same builder John Wright and had the same name with the Tuncurry (1909) taking over the same run after the Tuncurry (1903) was sold off to become the Tokelau

=== The ship builder ===
The builder of the Tuncurry John Wright was the founder of the town of Tuncurry and the ship building industry it became known for. In 1890 he built the small sailing vessel The Stanley and used it to carry wood to Sydney returning with general cargo. This was replaced by the Tuncurry (1903) which was jointly owned by both John Wright and Allen Taylor. He died in 1910

John Wright also built a number of other vessels used on the North Coast including the Bellinger, Our Jack and the Comboyne.

His son Ernest continued the business with the building of the Narani, Wallambra, Glenreagh, Allenwood, Nambucca 1, Nambucca 2 and the Uralba as well as many small tugs, lighters, yachts and launches with the ship building company going on to be known as E. Wright & Son

Ernest Wright the son of the builder of the Tuncurry built a house and adjacent church at approximately the time of the sale of the Tuncurry in 1909 and this family house was named Tokelau the same name as the vessel being sold was to be called. This house still stands and operates as a historic bed and breakfast

=== The Original Owner ===
The original owners of the vessel was Allen Taylor & Company. This company was formed by Sir Allen Arthur Taylor (1864–1940) a self-made man timber merchant, ship-owner and politician.

He founded Allen Taylor & Co in the 1890s and moved into the field of hardwood timber supply in which the company is still active in. In the 1890s he became active in the shipping of hardwood from the north coast also though his shipping company and the later (1919) the North Coast Steam Navigation Co which purchased his shipping interests.

The vessel was equally owned by Allen Taylor and Robert Murray McCheyne Anderson with 32 of the 64 Shares in the vessel with John Wright owning the other 32 shares.

=== Ship description Tuncurry (1903) ===
The vessel was a wooden single deck and the bridge ship with 2 masts and an elliptical stern it dimensions were:

Length from foredeck of stem to stern post was 113 feet 5 inches (34.57 m)
Length @ ¼ depth front top of weather deck at amidships to bottom of keel 112 feet 0 inches (34.14 m)
Main Breadth to outside plank 22 feet 2 inches (6.76 m)
Depth of Hold from tonnage deck to ceiling at amidships 7 feet 6 inches (2.29 m)
Depth from Top of beam amidships to top of keel 8 feet 3 inches (2.51 m)
Depth from top of deck as side amidships to bottom of keel 9 feet 1 inch (2.77 m)
Length of Engine Room 37 feet 0 inches (11.28 m)

The vessel had a 162.05 gross register tons (GRT) and a 92.43 net register tons (NRT) when first manufactured

As originally fitted out the vessel was described as:

Accommodation is also first class, having two nice ladies' cabins and a gentlemen’s cabin, all on the deck. She is fitted throughout with the electric light, and carries a steward and stewardess.

During its transfer to the Western Pacific High Commission as the Tokelau and its associated modification into a yacht for the High Commissioner, it appears the superstructure of the vessel was increased to have a 162 GRT and a 92 NRT.

While by the refit in 1916 back to a general cargo vessel the superstructure had been changed back to little more than a Forecastle Mess Room, a Stewards Cabin, an Engineers Cabin and an Officers Cabin. The Length of Engine Room had been shortened from 37 feet 0 inches (11.28 m) to 30 feet 5 inches (9.27 m)

The vessel had also had a decrease in the storage volume from its original tonnage of 162.05 gross register tons (GRT) to 158.07 gross register tons (GRT) and a 71.03 net register tons (NRT) when it was resurveyed for registration.

==== Propulsion ====
The Tuncurry was powered by a single British-built steel boiler producing 120 pounds per square inch (827.37 kPa) of steam built by Fraser & Son of London England.

This steam was fed into a 33 horsepower (25 kW) compound steam engine with cylinders of 13 inches (330 mm) and 26 inches (660 mm) bore by 18 inches (460 mm) stroke. By the time of the re surveyed for registration the power had been derated to 28 horsepower (21 kW).
The engine was manufactured in Scotland by McKie & Baxter, which had been established in Govan, Glasgow, Strathclyde in 1895 as a partnership between J A McKie and P McLeod Baxter, which after amalgamation in 1931 with Campbell & Calderwood stopped trading in 1968.

The vessel was able to achieve a speed of 9 knots.

== Ship service history ==
=== Tuncurry 1903–1909 ===
During this period the vessel was mastered by Captain O'Beirne. or Captain E. P. O'Bierne a Captain Francis P. Beirne was also employed in the North Coast Run by the North Coast Steam Navigation Company. A Francis O’Beirne Born Sydney, N.S.W. 1887 Received his Certificates of Competencies 2nd Mate on 22 July 1909, 1st Mate on 19 October 1911 and Master on 17 September 1915.

The Tuncurry (1903) was one of the first boats engaged in the Cape Hawke Trade and appears to be sold on when the Tuncurry (1909) was finished construction and took over the same run. When the Tuncurry (1903) first entered service it was welcomed as it was seen that it would improve the Tuncurry region as can be seen from the February 1904 local paper report:

It behoves all the Wallamba people to support their own boat; and it is quite evident that it is a great benefit to all to have a good steam service, as there is nothing which will enhance the value of a property in a district more than speedy and regular communication with the metropolis. In this we are singularly fortunate in having Taylor and Wright’s new boat, the “ Tuncurry”, which can do the trip in twelve hours from heads to heads. Her accommodation is also first class, having two nice ladies' cabins and a gentlemen’s cabin, all on the deck. She is fitted throughout with the electric light, and carries a steward and stewardess; and with the genial and trustworthy Captain O’Beirne, one may feel some pleasure in going for a trip to Sydney. As our bar is a very safe one, being under the lee of Cape Hawke, and as Captain O’Beirne has had such a long experience on our bar, I venture to predict that the “Tuncurry” will not miss one trip in the year. So far she has run her two trips a week as regular as clockwork. We also have a nice new drogher in connection with this service, which does the trip from Nabiac to Tuncurry in three hours, where the old one took eight; so that altogether we have the best steam service on the coast.

The Tuncurry was involved in a collision with a Tug in the early morning of 30 September 1906:

Passengers by the coasting, steamer Tuncurry were awakened early this morning whilst on a voyage from Sydney to Cape Hawke by a crash, and on looking out, were surprised to find that their vessel had been in collision with the tug Advance (1884). The Tuncurry returned to Sydney today. An ugly hole in her starboard quarter afforded ample evidence of the early morning smash.

The collision occurred shortly after 4 o'clock this morning in the vicinity of North Head. The Tuncurry, which belongs to Messrs. Allen Taylor and Co.'s line, in charge of Captain E. P. O'Bierne, left Pyrmont on Saturday night on her regular week's end trip to Cape Hawke. She carried several passengers and a general cargo. The weather, on clearing the Heads, was somewhat overcast and thick. All, however, went well until about five miles north of North Head, when the tug suddenly loomed up and the collision resulted. The tug had evidently come from Newcastle, and it is stated was "cruising" on the lookout for inward-bound sailing vessels. The two vessels met with considerable force.

The Tuncurry received the full strength of the blow on the starboard quarter. Her long counter saved her from being sent to the bottom. Had she been struck a little further forward nothing could have saved her. All the bulward planks in the vicinity were splintered, the damage extending below the covering board. The bulwark rail and stanchions were driven on board by the impact, and passengers who were berthed in the deck house in the vicinity were imprisoned by the wreckage. They were, however quickly rescued from their perilous position by Captain O'Bierne and his officers. The tug meanwhile stood by to render any necessary assistance. A hurried examination was made by Captain O'Bierne. and finding the damage well above water he signalled to the tug that no assistance was needed and immediately headed back to Sydney. The tug put into Newcastle, damaged at the bows.

It was later found at the Marine Court that:

at the time of the collision the Advance was in charge of a deck hand, McIvor, and as she was overtaking the vessel she should have kept out of the way of

The court did not find that there had "been any negligence on the part of the master of the tug in not coming on deck sooner, but thought he should have acted more wisely.

On 25 March 1908 the screw steamer was grounded on the bar at Cape Hawke and it was successfully refloated a few days later.

A description of a trip on the vessel in October 1908 suggest that it was not always a kind vessel in a rough sea:

I spent the long, weary hours "wedged" in a bunk on the upper deck of the staunch little trader which Captain O'Beirne navigates skilfully from port to port. We had run into a "snorting" southerly gale, and the Tuncurry just bumped into everything she disliked. But she fought her way to the southward, in spite of wind and sea, and landed me back home early one Monday morning with "gills" that were either light green or yellow, with a pain across the small of my back such as might have come from a hard "rope's-ending," and a feeling of emptiness in my lower hold, such as I had never known before. Still, it did not matter. Seasickness and soreness and other discomforts soon wore away

Allen Taylor & Robert Anderson as well as John Wright sold their shares in the vessel 21 November 1908 to a Merchant Thomas D/Joroker Knox?

Later in April 1910 (likely after the vessel was sold on) the master of the vessel Captain O Beirne was called to give evidence at the Marine Enquiry into the Satara sinking where as a witness knew of "the existence of an uncharted submerged rock" (Eidith Breakers) that had claimed the Satara.

=== Tokelau 1909–1916 ===
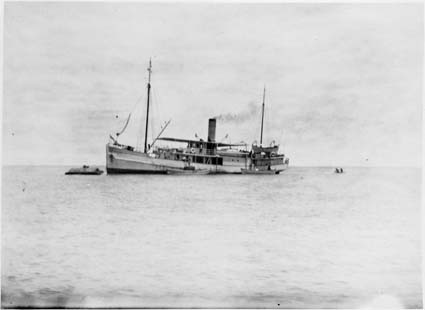
The Tuncurry as it appeared early on in its career as the Tokelau

The Tokelau served the Western Pacific High Commission for a number of years as a general Government steamer after having been brought by the British Government, and converted into a yacht for the Resident Commissioner of the Gilbert and Ellice Islands.

The delivery crew of the newly named S.S. Tokelau arrived back in Australia as passengers aboard the Oplan of Sandefjord from Ocean Island & Nauru on 20 May 1909 The delivery crew consisted of the Norwegian Pettersen C. and the British Baldwin S., Smith S., Wickstroke R., Irvine and Wilmott.

The vessel was used in the distribution of aid during a famine induced by drought in 1910:

The Gilbert Island natives are in a terribly bad way owing to the severe drought. Private advices received in Sydney today by the mail from the islands tell of the distress among the natives. No rain has fallen at the islands for months, and the native food supplies have become exhausted. The position became so acute that the Government steamer Tokelau was commissioned to proceed round the southern islands with rations for the distressed natives. Four whole districts on the island of Tapitenia out of 16, besides many people from other districts, are being supplied by the Government. It is proposed to bring the people from the northern end of the island of Nonuti to the central village Matan, to facilitate the serving out of supplies. As much as 20 or 30 tons of rice is being distributed every few weeks to relieve the distress among the poor natives. The cocoanuts available on Nonata Island had been purchased by the Government for food supplies.

While in the Gilbert Group the S.S. Tokelau was lying beached for cleaning in Tarawa lagoon and the Captain and Chief Engineer wanted to go out for a sail in poor weather conditions, so they took a local, Teriakai to look after them. Teriakai had a reputation for single handed in water combat with tiger sharks with just a knife. He was at the time a guest of His Majesty's, having got himself into trouble with local marriage laws. The crew welcomed his presence, his vital, stocky frame ideal for hard labor and his humour was appreciated by both crew and prisoners and kept morale high.

The vessel was put up for sale August 1915:

BROWN and JOSKE have been instructed by His Excellency the High Commissioner for the Western Pacific to sell by PUBLIC AUCTION' at their Rooms in Thomson street, Suva, on Saturday, 11 September, at 11 am.

The single screw wooden steamer "Tokelau" of 92 net tonnage, built in New South Wales in 1903, 120 feet length overall, 22 feet breadth, depth of hold 7ft. 6 in., length of top deck 80 feet, Gross tonnage 162 tons

Engines, evaporator, condenser, and dynamo in good condition, Accommodation consists of two saloon cabins and mess room forward, six cabins aft, two bathrooms, and two W.C.'s. Forecastle for eight; large divided fore peak.

This vessel is very suitable for trading in the islands For further particulars apply to The Secretary, Western Pacific High commissioner, Suva, or to the auctioneer.

The vessel appeared to make its way into Australian waters on 1 March 1916 when the vessel arrived in Sydney from Suva still using Tokelau as its name. The vessel was sailed over by Captain Dearie with A H Hassell (the future registered owner) acting as its agents with it docked at Beatties wharf.

=== Tuncurry 1916 ===
After arriving back in Australia the vessel was docked and repaired and refitted for general coastal trader cargo carrying with this work being carried out under the supervision of Captain Hutchins, and not only he, but the Navigation authorities also, were quite satisfied that the vessel was in good order. She had a 12 months survey, and this was her maiden trip in her new employer

== Shipwreck event ==
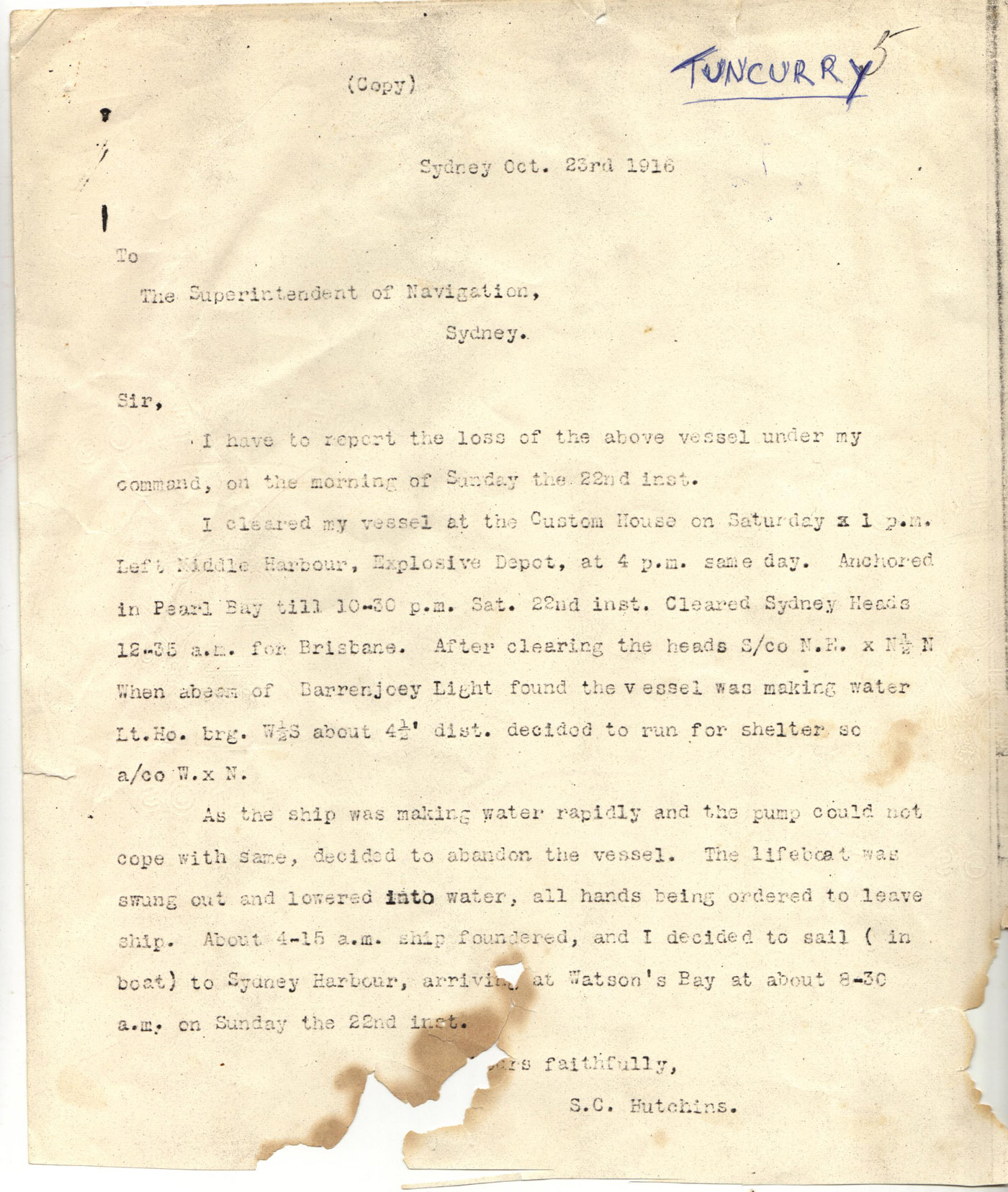
Captain Hutchins Marine Court Enquiry Evidence into the sinking of the Tuncurry (1903)

As reported to the Superintendent of Navigation in Sydney on 23 October 1916 the vessel cleared at Customs House on at 1pm on the Saturday. It then left Left Middle Harbour, Explosives Depot at 4pm and Anchored in Pearl Bay (Mosman) until 10.30 pm Saturday 21 October before leaving Sydney at 10.30 pm and clearing the Sydney Heads 12.35 am 22 October 1916, bound for Brisbane Steering NE x N1/2N.

The vessel foundered on 23 October 1916 with a contemporary account given in the newspapers of the day:

Captain Hutchins and ten men comprising the crew of the steamer Tuncurry (late Takelau),.had an exciting adventure off the coast yesterday morning. They arrived in Watson's Bay yesterday in the ship's life boat with news of the loss of the vessel. The Tuncurry sprang a leak and foundered three miles off Broken Bay.

The story told by the captain shows that the, disaster happened shortly before -daylight yesterday. The Tuncurry loaded a cargo of cement and explosives at Sydney, and cleared, the Sydney Heads at midnight on Saturday bound for Brisbane. Making north the steamer was soon pitching into a northerly breeze-and head sea. All, however, went well until 3 o'clock in the morning when the engineer on watch reported that the vessel was leaking badly. All hands were called, and the pumps started, the steamer meanwhile being headed in to-wards Broken Bay. Efforts were made by the captain to trace the cause of the leak, but all to no avail, and the soundings showed that the water was rapidly gaining on the pumps.

The position was serious, with several miles to cover before reaching shallow water, but all hands still worked hard to save the vessel. Their efforts at last proved fruitless, The steamer lost way, and gradually began to settle down. The captain, officers, and men just had time to launch the lifeboat and jump clear when the Tuncurry took a heavy plunge and disappeared below the surface. Favoured by a slant of wind the boat safely made the passage to the Heads, and the captain boarded the pilot steamer and reported the disaster. Subsequently the crew landed and hurried off to their homes

Captain Hutchins is unable to account for the leak, as the vessel had been overhauled before leaving port. The Tuncurry, which was a vessel of 162 tons, must not be confused with the vessel of the same name running to Cape Hawke for Messrs. Allen Taylor & Company. Though the steamer lost and engaged in the Cape Hawke trade she was brought here by the British Government some year ago and converted into a Yacht for the Commissioner at the Gilbert Group, and later sold to Messrs. Arthur H. Hassell &. Company, of Sydney, who recently renovated the steamer and converted her into a cargo boat, for coastal work The Tuncurry had been lying at Sydney since February last.

Crews accounts of the sinking go on to add that the leak was:

first noticed leak in the chain locker forward, notified captain who considered it unimportant. Captain retired around 2 am, leaving his mate on duty. 20 minutes later the chief engineer, Robert Clasper, noticed water coming in and he then worked the pumps for about 25 minutes before reporting to the mate. Skipper woken about 3.15 am by chief engineer who reported that the vessel was taking in water. The skipper was "incredulous" but the mate assured him that water was covering the floor in the engine room. Skipper altered course for Broken Bay at 3.30 am, but at 4.25am he ordered all hands launch the lifeboat. He went to his cabin to secure the ship’s papers and with them, the ship’s cat and a case of biscuits, he and the crew abandoned ship. The ship foundered 20 minutes later.

=== Crew at the time of Sinking ===
The captain Sanders Campbell Hutchins (born Brisbane, Queensland 1863 received his mate Certificates of Competency 12 May 1898), his mate (Morris Noel Cauvin), two engineers (Chief engineer Robert Clasper), three fireman (Joseph Edwards) and four sailors all of whom reached Watson's Bay in Sydney about 8 am on 22 October 1916, with no lives lost.

=== Cargo at time of sinking ===
The Tuncurry was carrying a general cargo which consisted of

Newcastle Morning Herald	Sydney Morning Herald	Sydney Morning Herald 23 Oct
1500 bags of Cement	1584 bags of Cement	90 cases of Cement
1100 cases of Explosives	1126 cases of Explosives	1200 cases of Explosives
100 Cases of Whiskey (Johnnie Walker)	100 Cases of Whiskey	100 Cases of Whiskey
60 Case of Jam	60 Case of Jam	60 Case of Jam

=== The Marine Court of Enquiry ===
At the Marine Court Inquiry held by the Department of Navigation into the sinking of the steamer Tuncurry as reported in NMH but not the SMH, the mate, Morris Noel Cauvin said "the vessel was diving into a nor’easter, and at every dive about a pint of water was spurting through a leak. The sea was breaking over forward, but only slightly. The cement and explosives had about a 4ft gap between them. He could not say whether this would strain the ship. He fancied he saw the masts go together as she sank".

Joseph Edwards, fireman, said that "he was sleeping in the engine room when water coming in from the leak drenched him. He jumped up, and was up to his knees in water. He considered that the ship was overloaded".

Regarding the question of overloading, the Judge, assessors and solicitors representing the owner, captain, officers and crew all discussed and deliberated, and decided that the engineer could have raised the alarm earlier than he did, and that there was a question of overloading, but, to track down the ship's carpenter so that he may give evidence would probably throw no more light on the matter. The Inquiry concluded with no official finding on the reason for the sinking.

At the inquiry it was stated that the ship was valued at £5500 and was insured for £4000 by the Batavia Insurance Company.

== Wreck site and wreckage ==
Recently discovered in 60 meters of water the wreck was found by divers in 2009.

The Tuncurry lies upright on sand in 60 meters of water with its Scottish boiler standing proud. The four-bladed propeller, propeller shaft and a mound of cargo are prominent elements.
