= Tuncurry (1909) =

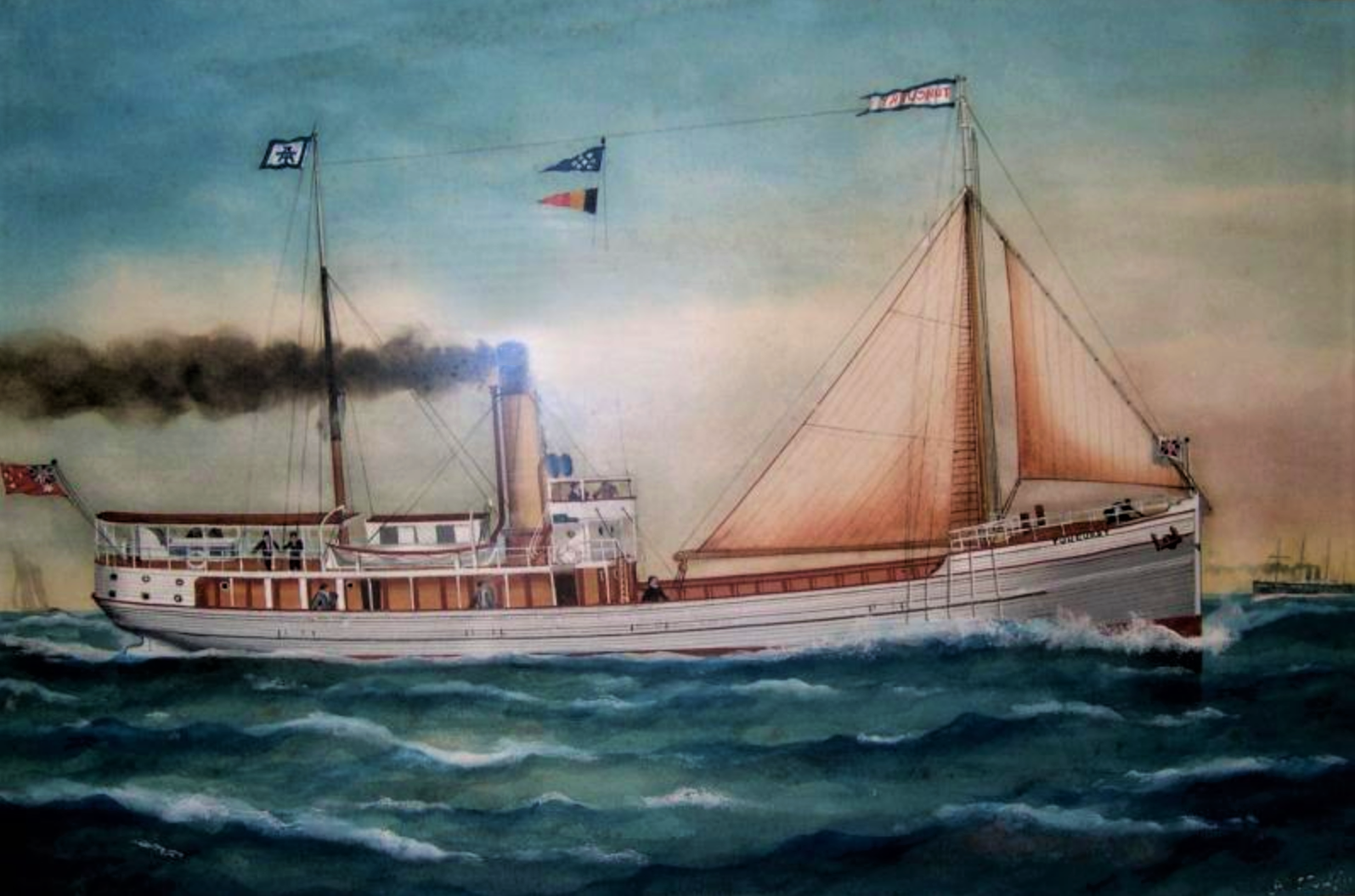
- painting by Alfred Dufty

History

Australia
- Name: Tuncurry II (1909–1950)
- Owner: Allen Taylor and Co (1909–1910); John Wright; Allen Taylor & Co. Ltd; Claude Stewart McLaren (1910–1917); John Wright & Co. Ltd; Allen Taylor & Co. Ltd; Claude Stewart McLaren (1917-1921); Allen Taylor and Co. Ltd and six others (1921-1932); H.R. Pountney (Pountney & McPherson) (1932-1935); Cam and Sons, Ltd 1935 - (1944-1946); Dept. of the Navy (Australian) 1944-1946); S.G. White (1946-1950)
- Port of registry: (Australia) Sydney (1909–1950)
- Builder: John Wright, Tuncurry, New South Wales, Australia
- Completed: 1909
- Identification: Ship official number 15042, ON 125205
- Fate: wrecked 9 April 1950

General characteristics
- Type: Wood carvel screw steamer
- Tonnage: 286.0 GRT; 151 NRT
- Length: 147 ft 0 in (44.81 m)
- Beam: 28 ft 2 in (8.59 m)
- Draught: 7 ft 7 in (2.31 m)
- Installed power: Steam 40nhp 2x C.2Cy.11" &22" Ross & Duncan, Glasgow plus sails
- Propulsion: twin 4 Blade Screw
- Sail plan: ketch
- Armament: Vickers Machine Gun
- Notes: Some reports say burnt in Kerosene Bay in June 1952. Wrecked: off Sydney

The Tuncurry II was a wooden carvel screw steamer built in 1909 at Tuncurry, Australia.

The ship was designed to enable navigation of the shallow bars when entering estuaries. Also for general cargo and the accommodation for 21 saloon class passengers. In the 1930s, the ship was used as a collier.

In 1921 at Tuncurry, the ship was lengthened by almost twenty feet by Ernest Wright, son of John Wright.

The Tuncurry II was used by the Royal Australian Navy to transport cargo. A Vickers machine gun was fitted at Garden Island. The ship was purchased by the Commonwealth for the navy in 1944 and sold in 1946.

A vessel with a similar name operated at much the same time, and so the Tuncurry (1903) ex Tokelau should not be confused with the Tuncurry (1909).
