= Dufty =

Dufty is a surname. Notable people with the surname include:

- Alan Dufty (born 1947), Australian Paralympic athlete
- Alec Dufty (born 1987), American soccer player and current coach
- Alfred William Buchanan Dufty (1858–1924), English-born Australian photographer
- Bevan Dufty (born 1955), American politician and Director of HOPE (Housing Opportunity, Partnerships and Engagement)
- Craddock Dufty (1900–1955), New Zealand rugby league player
- Colin Dufty (1889–1967), Australian rules footballer
- Francis Herbert Dufty (1846–1910), English-born Australian photographer
- John Dufty Lasher (1932–2015), New Zealand rugby league footballer
- Matthew Dufty (born 1996), Australian professional rugby league footballer
- Ross Dufty (1927–2009), Australian cricketer
- William Dufty (1916–2002), American writer, musician, and activist
