= Comboyne (1911) =

Australian wooden screw steamship

Coordinates: 34.5973°S 150.9217°E

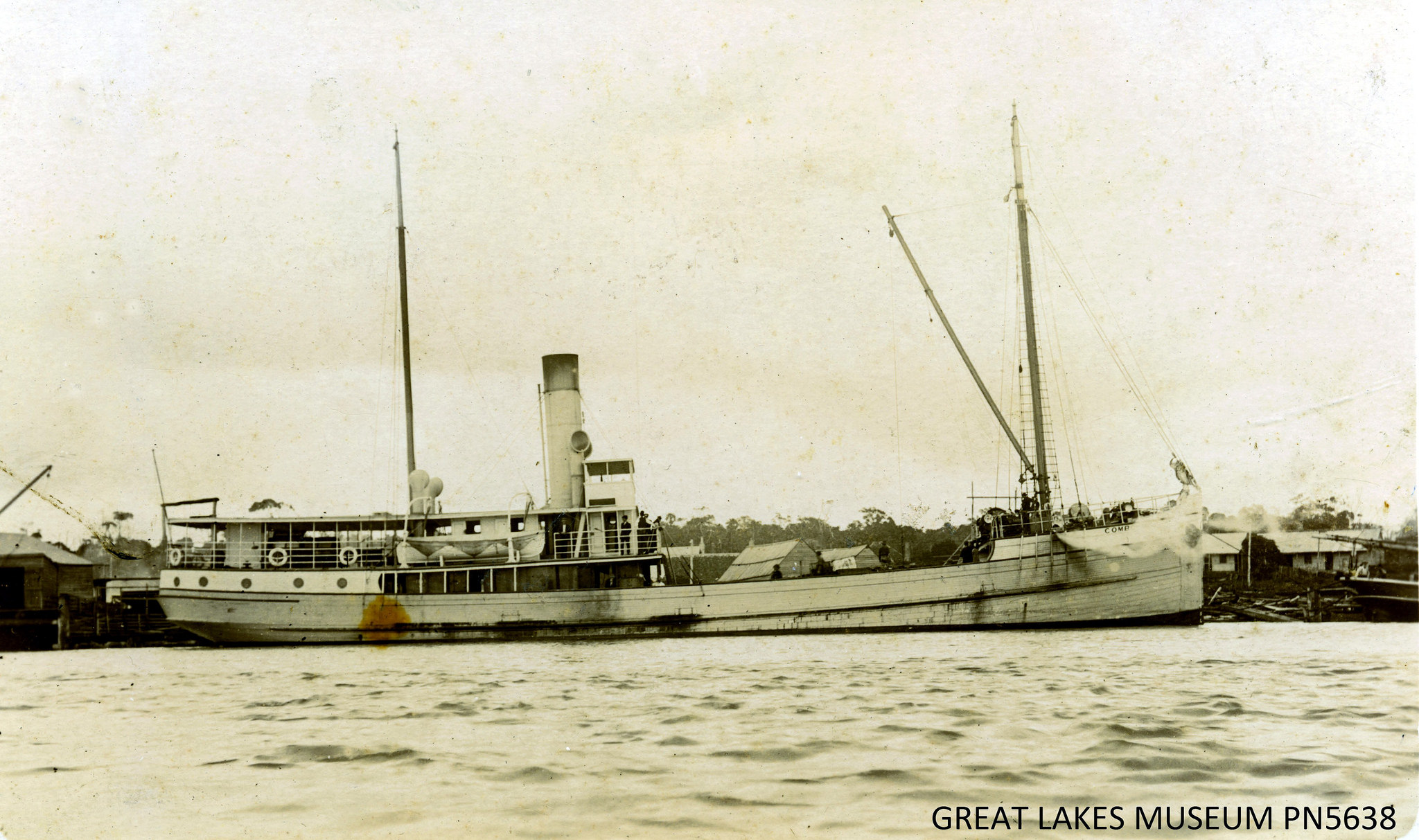

History

Australia
- Name: Comboyne
- Owner: Allen Taylor & Company
- Port of registry: Sydney
- Builder: John Wright (Snr) & Ernst Wright; Tuncurry, New South Wales, Australia
- Completed: 1911
- Identification: Ship official number 131486; Ship Sydney registration number: 25/1911
- Fate: Wrecked 27 November 1920

General characteristics
- Type: Wood screw steamer
- Tonnage: 281 GRT; 151 NRT
- Length: 137 ft 2 in (41.81 m)
- Beam: 29 ft 7 in (9.02 m)
- Draught: 7 ft 5 in (2.26 m)
- Installed power: Twin compound steam engine producing 40 hp.
- Propulsion: Twin screw

Comboyne was a wooden screw steamer built in 1911 at Tuncurry, that was wrecked when it struck an object while carrying timber to Wollongong and was lost at approximately 1 mile (1.6 km) off Bass Point, Shellharbour, New South Wales on 27 November 1920.

== Ship description and construction ==
The Comboyne was started to be built by John Wright (Snr), the founder of the town of Tuncurry and the ship building industry it became known for. He died in 1910; his son Ernest continued the business and finished the construction of Comboyne for the Allen Taylor & Company.

The screw steamer had a wooden single deck with two masts and an elliptical stern, with a length of 137 feet 2 inches (41.81 m), breadth of 29 feet 7 inches (9.02 m) and depth of 7 feet 5 inches (2.26 m).

== Ship service history ==
=== Launch and finishing ===
The finished hull of the Comboyne was launched from the Messrs. Allen Taylor and Co shipbuilding yard Friday 16 June 1911, intended for the Camden Haven trade, and witnessed by a large gathering from all parts of the local district. The hull was then towed to Sydney on Monday 26 June 1911 for the fitting of the boilers and engines fitted by Messrs. Chapman and Co by the Allen Taylor and Co owned steamer Tuncurry.

After fit-out the new twin-screw steamer Comboyne, owned by Allen Taylor and Co., Ltd., in partnership with Messrs. Wright Bros., left Sydney for Camden Haven on her maiden voyage on the evening of Wednesday 6 September 1911. The vessel was described as having been built faithfully of local hardwood with compound engines having cylinders of 11 inches (280 mm) x 22 inches (560 mm) diameter and a stroke of 16 inches (410 mm) producing 40 horsepower (30 kW), with a boiler of 12 feet 6 inches (3.81 m) x 10 feet 0 inches (3.05 m), and a hatch 36 feet (10.97 m) x 13 feet (3.96 m) with electric light having been fitted throughout. She had a steam windlass, McFarlane's patent winches, and all the latest appliances. The vessel was specially adapted for the carriage of passengers, timber, butter, and fish, and was specially designed for bar and harbour work, whilst being able to carry at least 230 tons on the light draft of 7 ft. The captain was Richard Lucy, late of the Wandra. Engineer was T. Dun, also of the Wandra.

=== September 1912: sinking and refloating ===
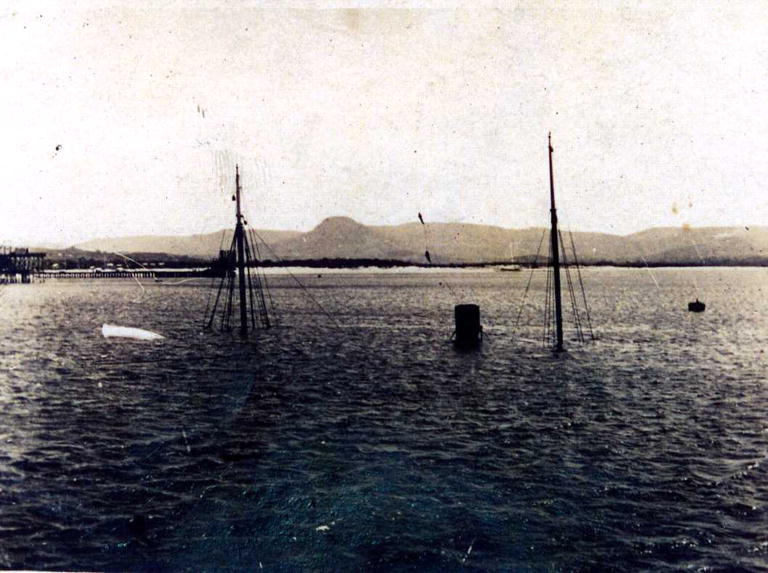
The Comboyne as it appeared when it first sank

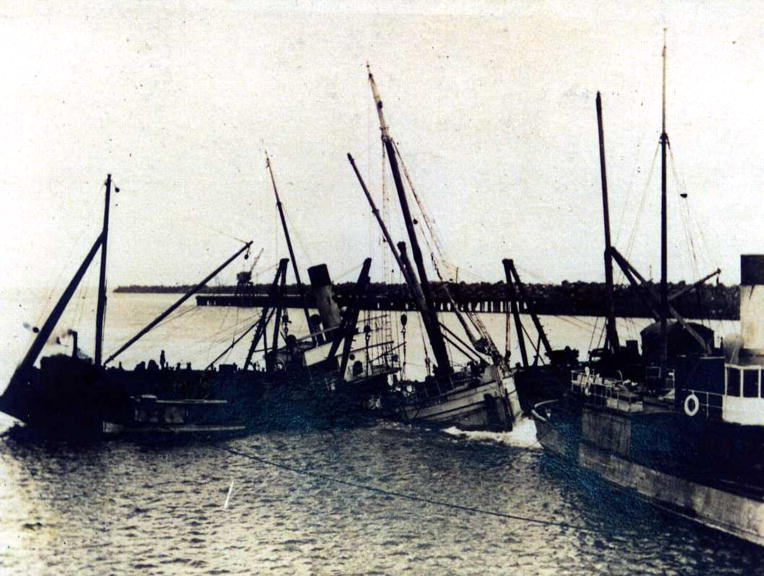
The Comboyne as it being raised

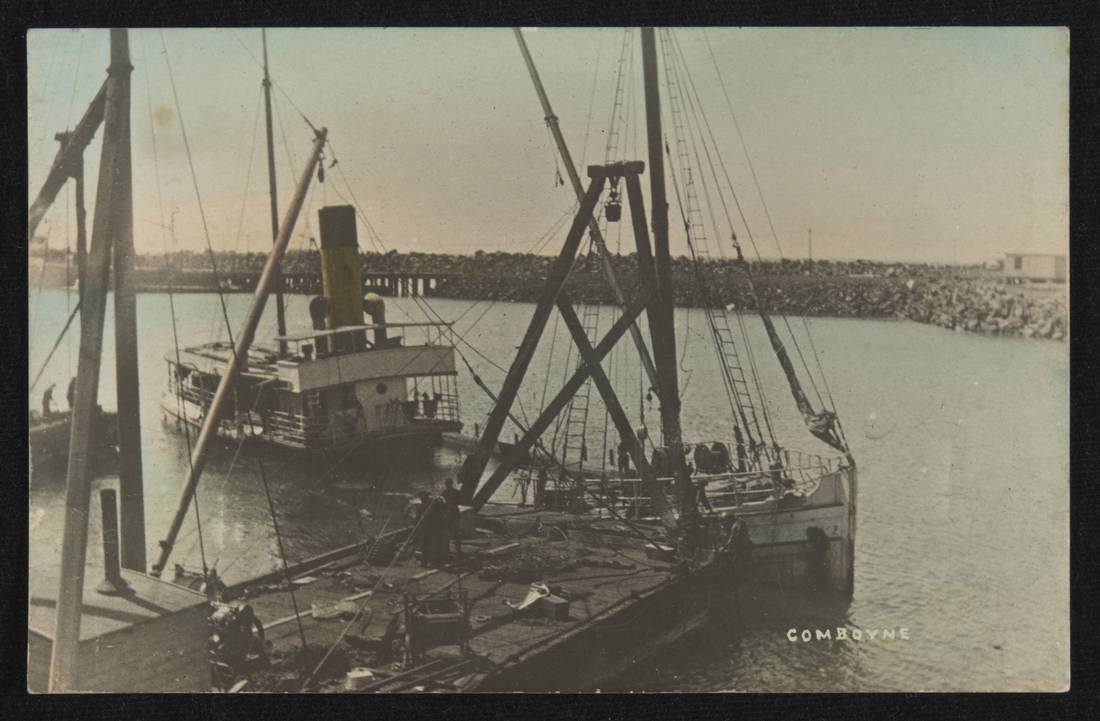
The Comboyne coming above the water

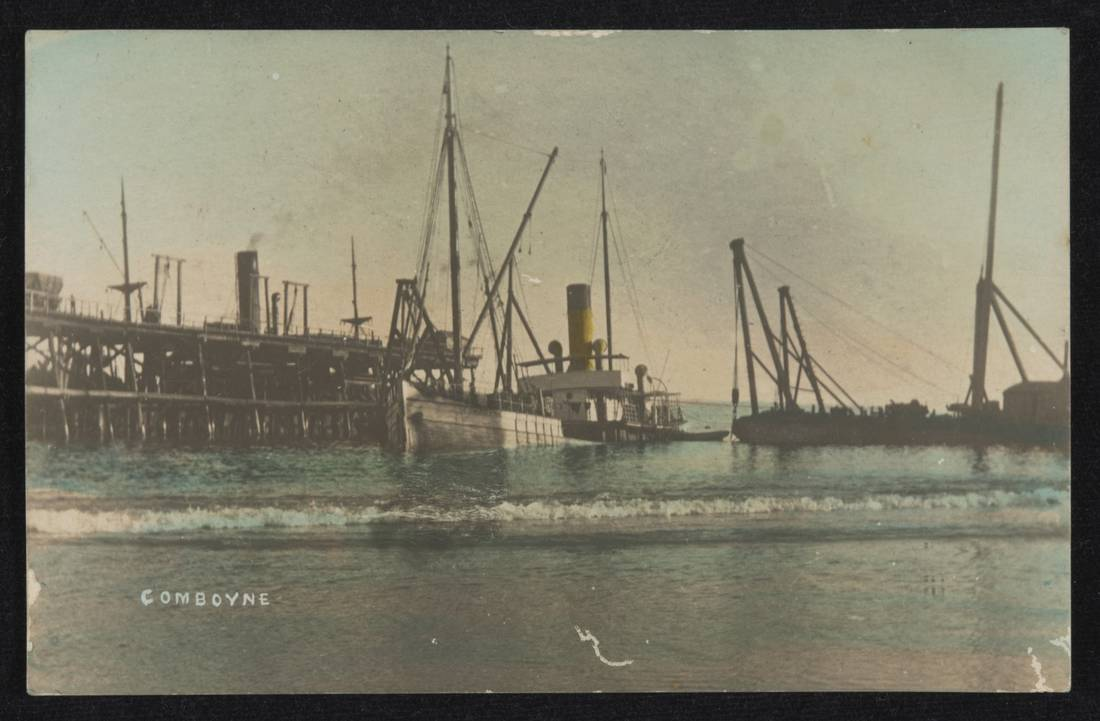
The Comboyne as raised seen from the shore

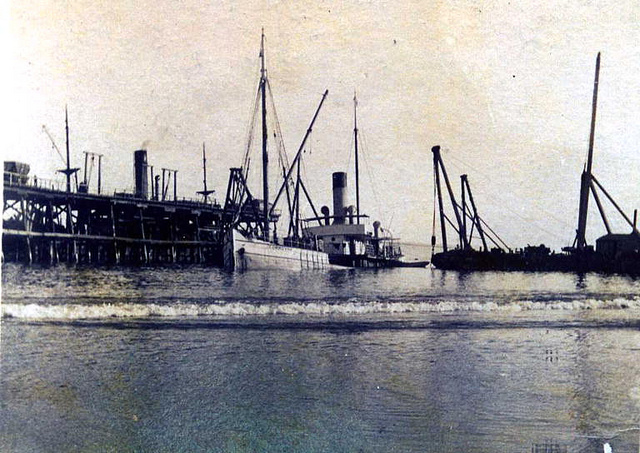
The Comboyne as raised seen from the shore

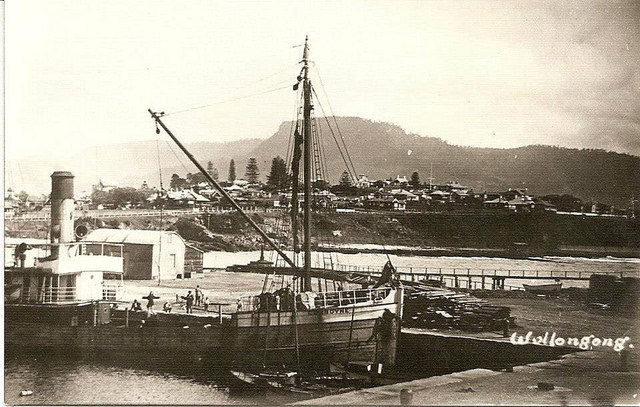
The Comboyne after it was raised in Wollongong Harbour

On Sunday 8 September 1912:

The steamer Comboyne, whilst trying to put into Port Kembla Harbor at 3 o'clock in the morning, struck the end of the eastern breakwater, and a big hole was knocked in her side. The water poured in, and the mate, who was on the bridge, decided to run for the beach. The captain by this time was on deck, and seeing the vessel fast settling down ordered the crew of 14 into the boats.

They had no sooner entered the boats than the Comboyne sank. The captain was still on board, and owing to the darkness was unable to make out where the boat was. He then struck out for the shore, which he reached after having been over half an hour in the water. The crew landed safely and made their way to the Electrolytic Company's works.

The vessel sank in about 40 ft. of water. The stewardess (Miss E. Birkenshaw) was asleep at the time the vessel struck, and was only just able to escape in her night dress. The escape of all on board is regarded as wonderful, seeing that the vessel sank within a couple of minutes of the time of striking. Captain Lacey said he could not account for the accident. Whilst swimming ashore he thought he was done for, but he struggled on and managed to reach land.

About 2 ft. of the funnel is showing out of the water, and arrangements are to (be made at once for refloating).

On 2 October the Marine Court inquiry found that the accident had been caused by default of the mate, Joseph Daley, in not calling the master earlier.

The vessel was later refloated, subsequently towed to Sydney for repairs and again made seaworthy, and resumed running in the coastal service in late October.

=== October 1912: Stuck fast and towed off by a tug ===
After the vessel's September experience in Wollongong, it was brought to Sydney where it was placed on Shorts floating dock, and repairs were effected. Once these were completed the Comboyne left Sydney on Saturday 26 October 1912 on the first trip since the mishap. Ill luck appears to have attended her again, however, as she had almost reached her destination when it struck the sand spit off the northern breakwater at Camden Haven Heads on the night of Sunday, 27 October 1912.

The tug Unique was in attendance, with the local harbour pilot where they were told that there was no necessity to tow the vessel off. The tug returned to its anchorage, but was later whistled for by the Comboyne, which was then fast on the spit. The tug spent nearly an hour towing the steamer off.

The captains asserted that the leading lights on the breakwater were wrongly placed, and were misleading.

=== October 1913: Aground again ===
While crossing the bar Laurieton at midnight Sunday 5 October 1913 the steamer Comboyne again become stuck fast, this time on the south spit of the bar, and remained fast there until approximately 8.30 am Monday morning. Hawsers had been put out at 6 am, and, after strenuous work, the steamer was successfully refloated. No serious damage was sustained, as the sea was moderate through the night.

=== May 1914: Aground on the Camden Haven Bar ===
Wednesday 20 May 1914 Comboyne again crossing the Camden Haven Bar was held fast with the vessel expected to be floated off with the night's high tide.

=== March 1915: Mechanical troubles ===
When leaving Sydney on the evening of Monday 22 March 1915 the steamer Comboyne was forced to return to port owing to mechanical trouble. The vessel had cleared the Sydney Heads shortly after 11 pm for Camden Haven. When it was north of Sydney a breakdown of the port engine occurred. The Comboyne was able to be turned round and with the aid of the starboard engine was able to proceed slowly back to port, arriving at about 6 am on Tuesday. After receiving the necessary repairs that morning the vessel sailed again for Camden Haven.

=== 1915: Discovery of a murder ===
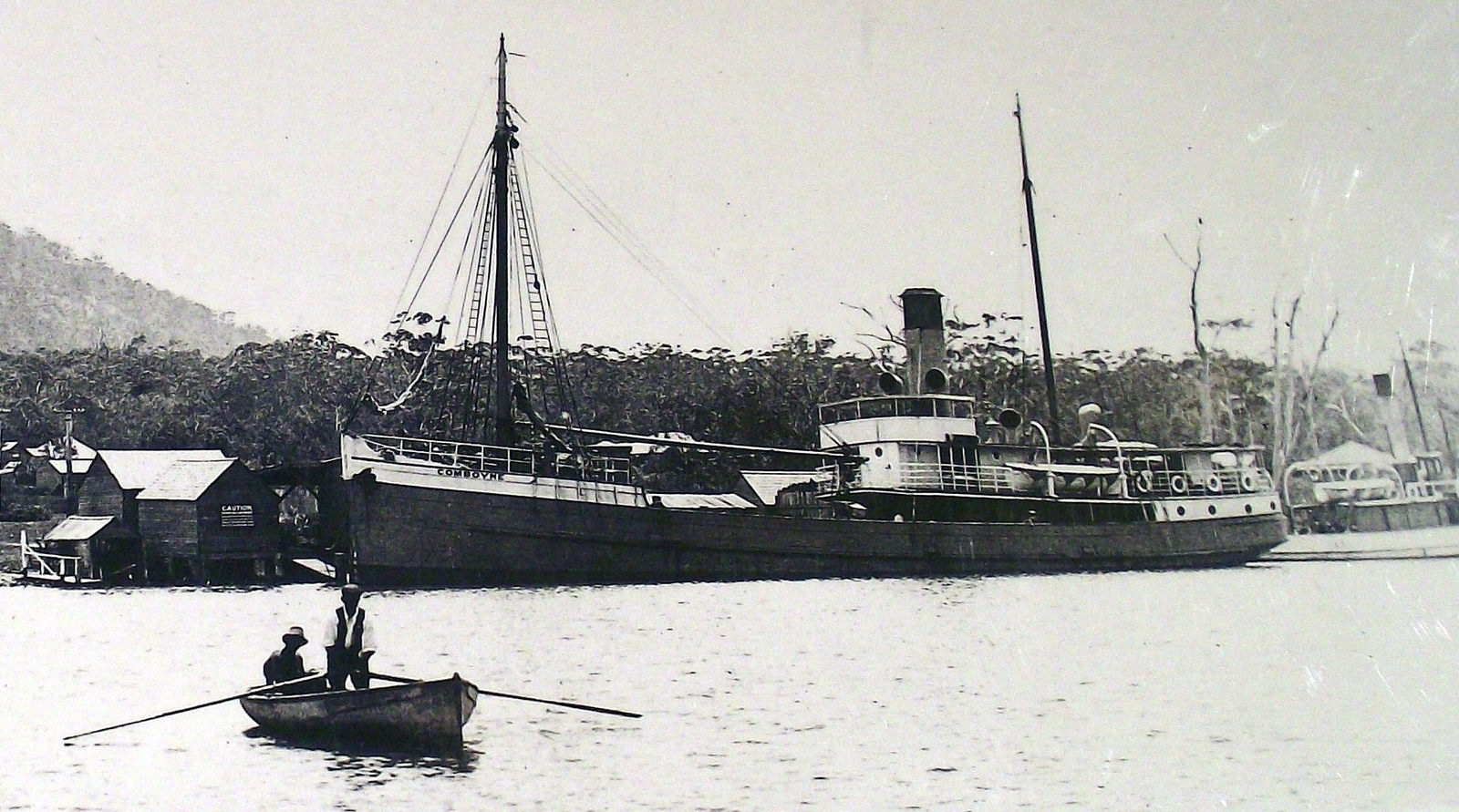
The Comboyne at Laurieton

On Tuesday 21 September 1915 the Comboyne, while proceeding up the Camden Haven River, caused a man's body to come to the surface. The body was recovered by the police, who found that it had been weighted down with an anchor (weighing 1½ cwt 168 pounds (76.20 kg)). The head had been battered, both jaws being broken, as was the nose. It was supposed that the man had been murdered.

The man, named Purcell, had lived at Hunter's Hill formerly but had arrived at Laurieton in April, with a companion, to become a fisherman. Towards the end of August Purcell had disappeared, but no alarm was raised, as it was thought he had gone to a neighbouring town. The police then arrested his companion.

=== 1918: Twice aground in Narooma ===
The Comboyne twice (February and March) went aground on the bar crossing at Narooma.

=== 1918: Replacement of Comboyne Kelson ===
In August 1918 an examination found that the steamer Comboyne would require her keelson to be repaired or replaced. To do this, the whole top structure had to bee removed, including the bridge, funnel, and deck cabins.

In the ordinary course this would have been done by piecemeal removal of the superstructure, and would have taken some weeks to remove and replace. At this time a Mr Waugh had just built the Hawk, a 100-tonne floating sheerleg, and the Comboyne repairs became its first major project. The super structure of the Comboyne was unbolted from the deck, large balks of timber were placed athwart for the purpose of raising, and others fore and aft as supports. The 35-tons vessel was lifted off the boat and placed on a lighter. The boiler and the two sets of engines were also taken out of the Comboyne by the Balmain Company's lifting appliances.

The hull of the Comboyne was towed into dock to have false keelsons put in her. On the following Friday, the Comboyne was positioned alongside a Pyrmont wharf in preparation for the abstracted vitals to be restored. The boiler and engines were already in place; the punt arrived between 10 and 11 o'clock and was dropped between the Hawk and the Comboyne. The six-fall tackle was hooked on to the slings. In less than half an hour, the whole of the top of the vessel had again been fitted into its old station on the steamer. The remaining work of screwing the deck bolts into place again and replacing the boiler, engines, and top structure was completed within the day.

See images (Chase up)

== Shipwreck event ==
On Saturday, 27 November 1920 the vessel reportedly struck a submerged rock or a floating object.

While steaming off Bass Point, near Kiama. She was carrying a full cargo of timber, and was at the time about a mile from the shore. The bump caused the vessel at once to leak very badly, and the pumps proved unable to cope with the water. An attempt was made to beach the Comboyne, but she took a dangerous list, and began to settle down. The crew therefore took to the boats, and soon afterwards the vessel disappeared. The men in the boats went to rest till daylight, as they were very tired after their efforts on the Comboyne. When the fog lifted they hailed a passing coaster, which picked them up and carried them to Kiama. They lost all their belongings in the Comboyne.
