= HMAS Narani =

Royal Australian Navy auxiliary minesweeper of World War II

History
- Name: Narani
- Owner: Illawarra & South Coast Steam Navigation Company
- Builder: E. Wright, Cape Hawke, New South Wales
- Launched: 1914

History

Australia
- Name: Narani
- Commissioned: 11 June 1941

General characteristics
- Displacement: 381 gross tonnage
- Length: 148.6 ft (45 m)
- Beam: 33.2 ft (10 m)
- Draught: 8.7 ft (3 m)
- Armament: 1 × 12-pounder gun; 1 × 20mm Oerlikon cannon; 1 × .303-inch Vickers machine gun; 4 × Type D depth charges

HMAS Narani was an auxiliary minesweeper operated by the Royal Australian Navy (RAN) during World War II. Narani was requisitioned from the Illawarra & South Coast Steam Navigation Company as auxiliaries. The 381-ton vessel was armed with a 12-pounder 12cwt QF gun, a 20mm Oerlikon cannon, a .303-inch Vickers machine gun, and four Type D depth charges, and was commissioned into the RAN on 11 June 1941.

During the war, Narani, Uki, and Bermagui made up Group 77 Minesweeper, based at HMAS Maitland, in Newcastle, New South Wales.

Returned to her owners on 10 July 1946, she plied the coastal trade until 1951 when she was sold to New Guinea Borneo Mangrove Co., Port Moresby. She was broken up in 1954.
