= Advance (1884) =

Iron screw steamer tug shipwrecked in 1908

Coordinates: 33.1806°S 151.70328°E

History
- Name: Advance
- Owner: Messrs Fenwick Brothers, Sydney
- Port of registry: Sydney
- Ship registration number: 19/1902
- Ship official number: 88922
- Builder: Unknown Williamstown, Victoria, AUSTRALIA
- Completed: 1884
- Fate: Wrecked 25 December 1908

General characteristics
- Type: Iron screw steamer
- Tonnage: 181 GRT; 12 NRT
- Length: 36.57 m
- Beam: 6.400 m
- Draught: 3.962 m
- Installed power: Compound
- Crew: 8

The Advance was an iron screw steamer tug built in 1884 that was wrecked when she collided with Inverna off Catherine Hill Bay, New South Wales, Australia, on 25 December 1908.

== Ship service history ==
The Advance was involved in a collision with the Tuncurry in the early morning of 30 September 1906. The Tuncurry, under the command of Captain O'Bierne, was making a routine voyage from Pyrmont to Cape Hawke, carrying several passengers and general cargo. About five miles north of North Head (one of the Sydney Heads), it was suddenly rammed by the Advance, which was travelling from Newcastle and hadn't seen the other ship. The Tuncurry took the brunt of the damage, although Captain O'Bierne quickly decided that the ship was in no danger of sinking. He signalled to the tug that no assistance was needed, and immediately headed back to Sydney. The Advance returned to Newcastle, damaged at the bows.

It was later found at the Marine Court that at the time of the collision the Advance had been the under charge of a deck hand, McIvor. The court did not find that there had "been any negligence on the part of the master of the tug in not coming on deck sooner, but thought he should have acted more wisely".

== Wreck ==
Advance, commanded by Alick Mckenzie, collided due to foggy weather in the harbor at Newcastle, New South Wales, with Inverna off Catherine Hill Bay, during the early morning hours of 25 December 1908 and sank.

== See also ==
- Lists of shipwrecks
