= Melanesians =

Indigenous inhabitants of Melanesia

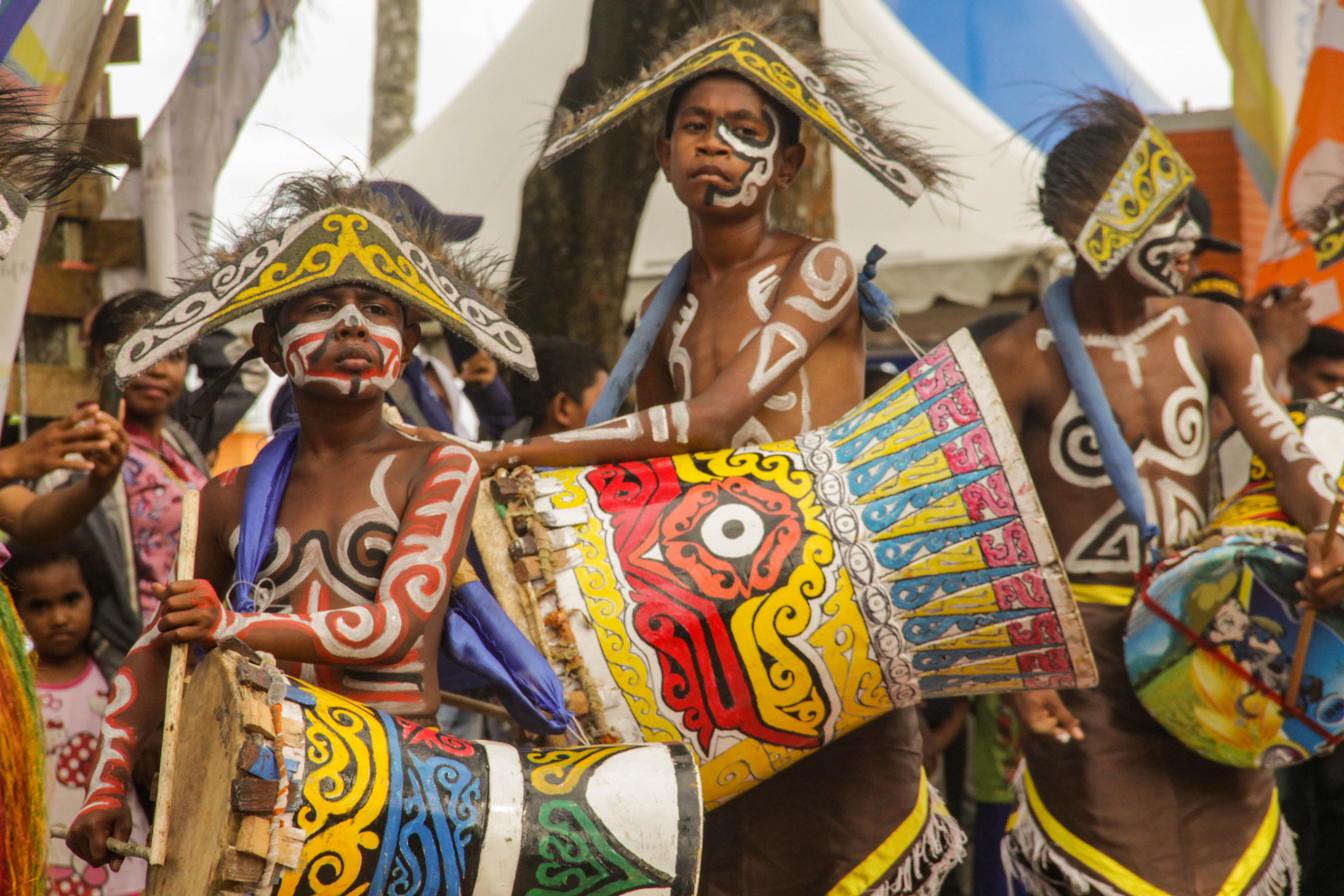
- Biak people in Southwest Papua, Indonesia

Languages
- Melanesian languages, Papuan languages, Indonesian, English, English-based creoles, Rabaul Creole German, French

Religion
- Predominantly Christianity, minority traditional Melanesian religion, and Islam

Related ethnic groups
- Aboriginal Australians, Austronesian peoples, Euronesians

Melanesians are the predominant and Indigenous inhabitants of Melanesia, in an area stretching from New Guinea to the Fiji Islands. Most speak one of the many languages of the Austronesian language family (especially ones in the Oceanic branch) or one of the many unrelated families of Papuan languages. There are several creoles of the region, such as Tok Pisin, Hiri Motu, Solomon Islands Pijin, Bislama, and Papuan Malay.

== Origin and genetics ==
The origin of Melanesians is generally associated with the first settlement of Australasia by a lineage dubbed 'Australasians' or 'Australo-Papuans' during the Initial Upper Paleolithic, which is "ascribed to a population movement with uniform genetic features and material culture" (Ancient East Eurasians), and sharing deep ancestry with modern East Asian peoples and other Asia-Pacific groups. It is estimated that people reached Sahul (the geological continent consisting of Australia and New Guinea) between 50,000 and 37,000 years ago. Rising sea levels separated New Guinea from Australia about 10,000 years ago. Recent genomic studies suggest that Indigenous Australians and Papuans diverged from Eurasians 51,000 to 72,000 years ago, and from each other around 25,000 to 40,000 years ago.

The eastern part of Melanesia, which includes Vanuatu, New Caledonia, and Fiji, was first inhabited by Austronesian peoples, who created the Lapita culture, and later followed by Melanesian groups. They appear to have occupied these islands as far east as the main islands in the Solomon Islands, including Makira and possibly the smaller islands farther to the east.

Particularly along the north coast of New Guinea and in the islands north and east of New Guinea, the Austronesian people, who had migrated into the area more than 3,000 years ago, came into contact with these pre-existing populations of Papuan-speaking peoples. In the late 20th century, some scholars theorized a long period of interaction, which resulted in many complex changes in genetics, languages, and culture among the peoples. It was proposed that, from this area, a very small group of people (speaking an Austronesian language) departed to the east to become the forebears of the Polynesian people. The indigenous Melanesian populations are thus often classified into two main groups based on differences in language, culture or genetic ancestry: the Papuan-speaking and Austronesian-speaking groups.

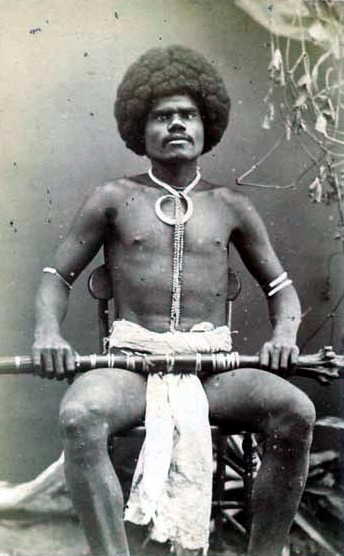
A Fijian mountain warrior, photograph by Francis Herbert Dufty, 1870s.

This Polynesian theory was overturned by a 2010 study, which was based on genome scans and evaluation of more than 800 genetic markers among a wide variety of Pacific peoples. It found that neither Polynesians nor Micronesians have any genetic relation to Melanesians. Both groups are strongly related genetically to East Asians, particularly Taiwanese aborigines, therefore making Polynesians and Micronesians not related to Melanesians. It appeared that, having developed their sailing outrigger canoes, the ancestors of the Polynesians migrated from East Asia, moved through the Melanesian area quickly on their way, and kept going to eastern areas, where they settled. They left little genetic evidence in Melanesia, "and only intermixed to a very modest degree with the indigenous populations there". Nevertheless, the study still found a small Austronesian genetic signature (below 20%) in less than half of the Melanesian groups who speak Austronesian languages, and which was entirely absent in the Papuan-speaking groups.

The study found a high rate of genetic differentiation and diversity among the groups living within the Melanesian islands, with the peoples not only distinguished between the islands, but also by the languages, topography, and size of an island. Such diversity developed over the tens of thousands of years since initial settlement, as well as after the more recent arrival of Polynesian ancestors at the islands. Papuan-speaking groups in particular were found to be the most differentiated, while Austronesian-speaking groups along the coastlines were more intermixed.

Further DNA analysis has taken research into new directions, as more Homo erectus races or subspecies have been discovered since the late 20th century. Based on his genetic studies of the Denisova hominin, an ancient human species discovered in 2010, Svante Pääbo claims that ancient human ancestors of the Melanesians interbred in Asia with these humans. He has found that people of New Guinea share 4%–7% of their genome with the Denisovans, indicating this exchange. The Denisovans are considered cousin to the Neanderthals. Both groups are now understood to have migrated out of Africa, with the Neanderthals going into Europe, and the Denisovans heading east about 400,000 years ago. This is based on genetic evidence from a fossil found in Siberia. The evidence from Melanesia suggests their territory extended into southeast Asia, where ancestors of the Melanesians developed.

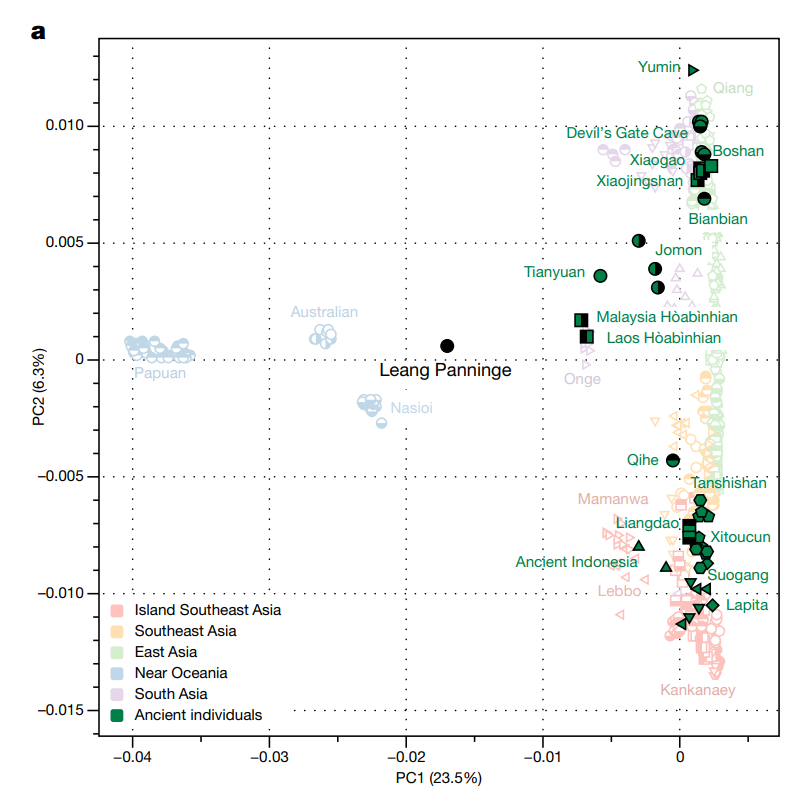
PCA calculated on present-day and ancient individuals from eastern Eurasia and Oceania. PC1 (23.8%) distinguish East-Eurasians and Australo-Melanesians, while PC2 (6.3%) differentiates East-Eurasians along a North to South cline.

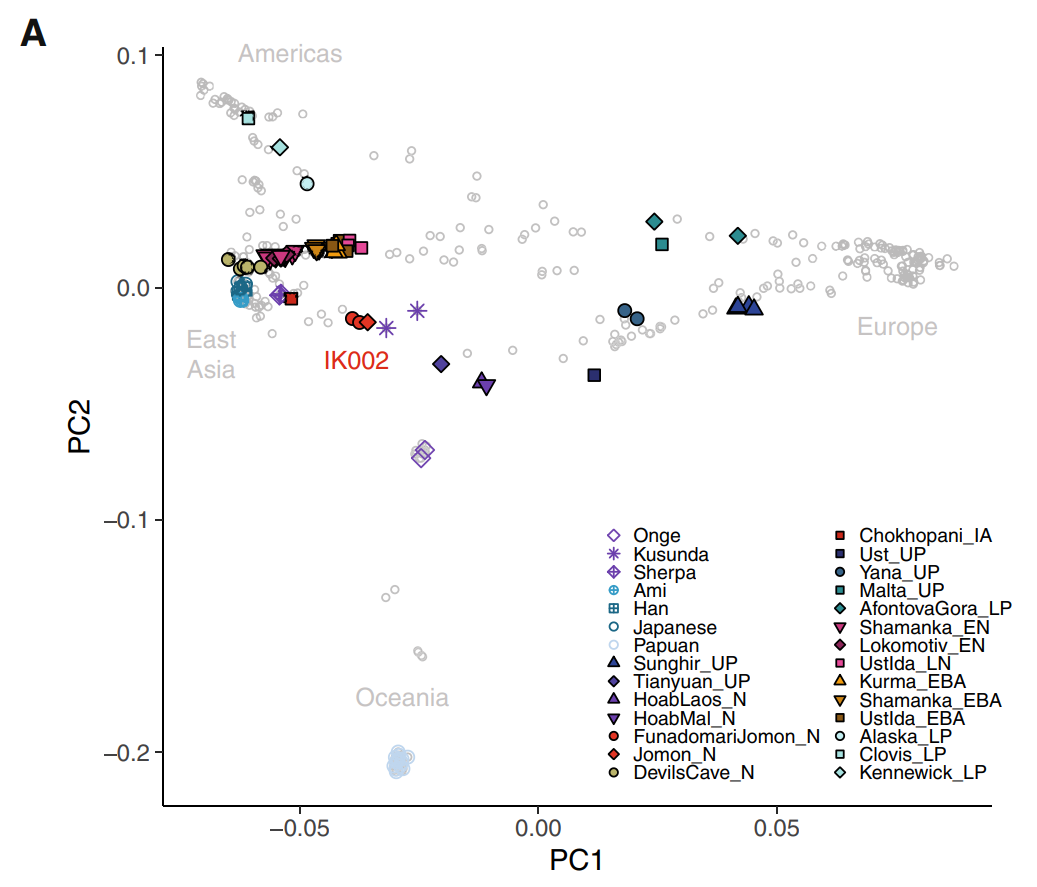
Principal component analysis (PCA) of ancient and modern-day individuals from worldwide populations. Oceanians (Aboriginal Australians and Papuans) are most differentiated from both East-Eurasians and West-Eurasians.

== History of classification ==
Early European explorers noted the physical differences among groups of Pacific Islanders. In 1756, Charles de Brosses theorized that there was an 'old black race' in the Pacific who were conquered or defeated by the peoples of what is now called Polynesia, whom he distinguished as having lighter skin. By 1825, Jean Baptiste Bory de Saint-Vincent developed a more elaborate, 15-race model of human diversity. He described the inhabitants of modern-day Melanesia as Mélaniens, a distinct racial group from the Australian and Neptunian (i.e. Polynesian) races surrounding them.

In 1832, Dumont D'Urville expanded and simplified much of this earlier work. He classified the peoples of Oceania into four racial groups: Malayans, Polynesians, Micronesians, and Melanesians. D'Urville's model differed from that of Bory de Saint-Vincent in referring to 'Melanesians' rather than 'Mélaniens.' He derived the name Melanesia from Greek μέλας, black, and νῆσος, island, to mean "islands of black people".

Bory de Saint-Vincent had distinguished Mélaniens from the indigenous Australians. Dumont D'Urville combined the two peoples into one group.

Soares et al. (2008) have argued for an older pre-Holocene Sundaland origin in Island Southeast Asia (ISEA) based on mitochondrial DNA. The "out of Taiwan model" was challenged by a study from Leeds University and published in Molecular Biology and Evolution. Examination of mitochondrial DNA lineages shows that they have been evolving in ISEA for longer than previously believed. Ancestors of the Polynesians arrived in the Bismarck Archipelago of Papua New Guinea at least 6,000 to 8,000 years ago.

Paternal Y chromosome analysis by Kayser et al. (2000) also showed that Polynesians have significant Melanesian genetic admixture. A follow-up study by Kayser et al. (2008) discovered that only 21% of the Polynesian autosomal gene pool is of Melanesian origin, with the rest (79%) being of East Asian origin. A study by Friedlaender et al. (2008) confirmed that Polynesians are closer genetically to Micronesians, Taiwanese Aborigines, and East Asians, than to Melanesians. The study concluded that Polynesians moved through Melanesia fairly rapidly, allowing only limited admixture between Austronesians and Melanesians. Thus, the high frequencies of B4a1a1 are the result of drift and represent the descendants of a very few successful East Asian females.

== Austronesian languages and cultural traits ==
Austronesian languages and cultural traits were introduced along the north and south-east coasts of New Guinea and in some of the islands north and east of New Guinea by migrating Austronesians, probably starting over 3,500 years ago. This was followed by long periods of interaction that resulted in many complex changes in genetics, languages, and culture.

It was once postulated that, from this area, a very small group of people (speaking an Austronesian language) departed to the east and became the forebears of the Polynesian people. This theory was, however, contradicted by a study published by Temple University finding that Polynesians and Micronesians have little genetic relation to Melanesians; instead, they found significant distinctions between groups living within the Melanesian islands.

Genetic links have been identified between the Oceanic peoples. Polynesians are dominated by a type of macro-haplogroup C y-DNA, which is a minority lineage in Melanesia, and have a very low frequency of the dominant Melanesian y-DNA K2b1. A significant minority of them also belong to the typical East Asian male Haplogroup O-M175.

One study suggests that all humans outside of Sub-Saharan Africa have inherited some genes from Neanderthals, and that Melanesians are the only known modern humans whose prehistoric ancestors interbred with the Denisova hominin, sharing 4%–6% of their genome with this ancient cousin of the Neanderthal.

== Incidence of blond hair in Melanesia ==
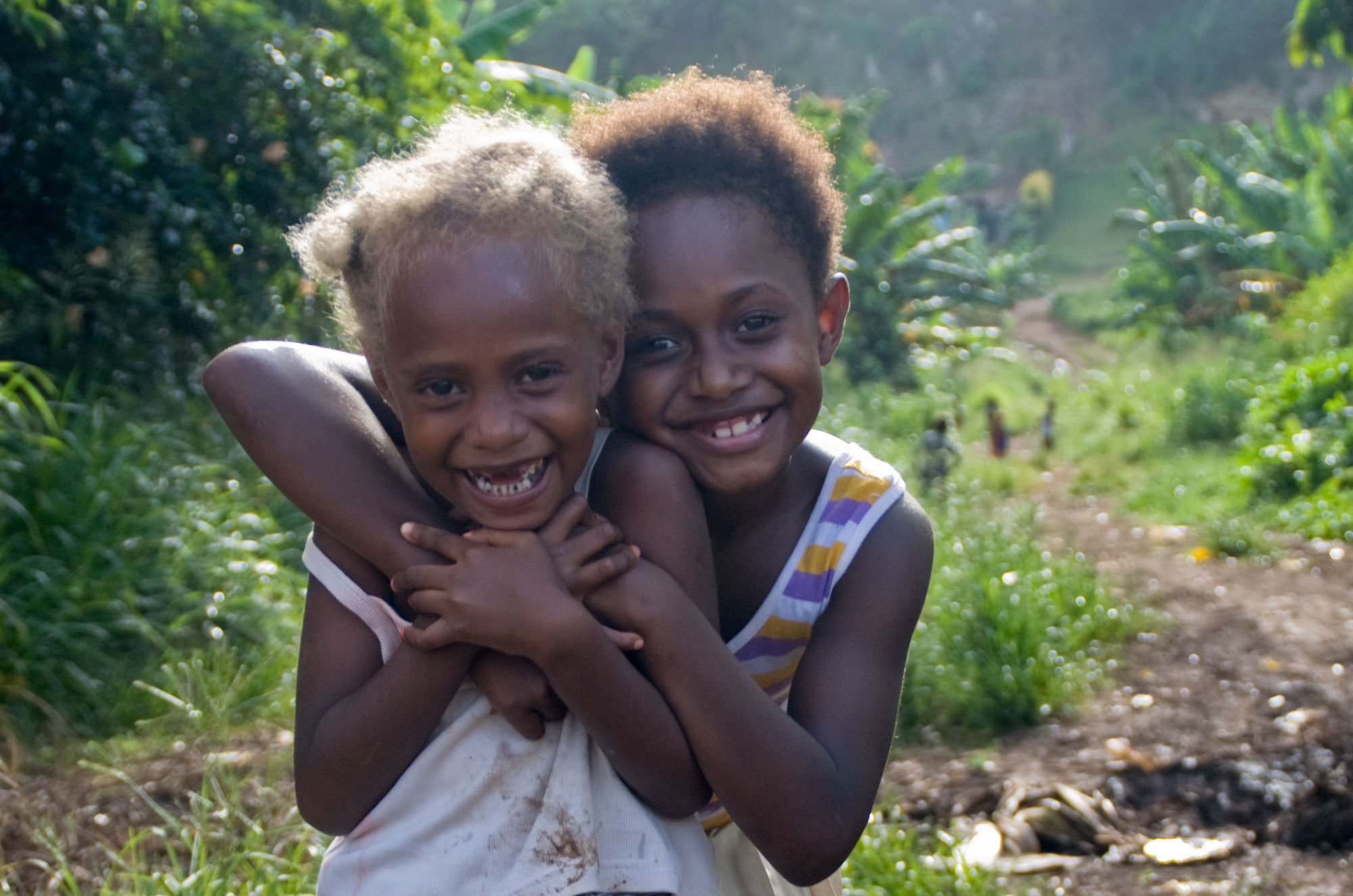
Girls from Vanuatu

Most people with blond hair are of Northern European ethno-racial origins. It evolved independently in Melanesia, where Melanesians of some islands (along with some indigenous Australians) are one of a few non-European ethnic groups who have blond hair. This has been traced to an allele of TYRP1 unique to these people, and is not the same gene that causes blond hair in the Northern European region. As with blond hair that arose in Northern Europe, incidence of blondness is more common in children than in adults, with hair tending to darken as the individual matures.

== Melanesian areas of Oceania ==
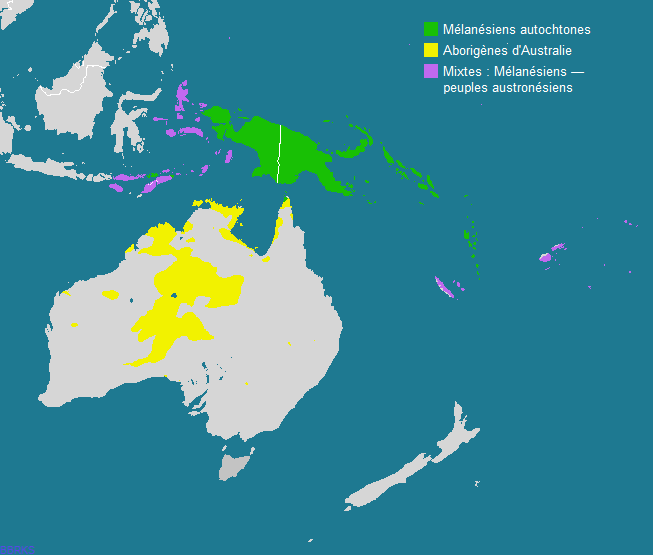
Map of Australo-Melanesian area.

The predominantly Melanesian areas of Oceania include New Guinea and surrounding islands, the Solomon Islands, Vanuatu and Fiji. New Caledonia and nearby Loyalty Islands for most of their history have had a majority Melanesian population, but the proportion has dropped to 43% in the face of modern immigration.

The largest and most populous Melanesian country is Papua New Guinea. The largest city in Melanesia is Port Moresby in Papua New Guinea with about 318,000 people, mostly of Melanesian ancestry. The western half of New Guinea is part of Indonesia and is predominantly inhabited by indigenous Papuans, with a significant minority of settlers from other parts of Indonesia.

In Australia, the total population of Torres Strait Islanders, a Melanesian people,as of 30 June 2016, was about 38,700 identifying as being of Torres Strait Islander origin only, and 32,200 of both Aboriginal Australian and Torres Strait Islander origin (a total of 70,900).

== See also ==
- Indigenous people of New Guinea
- List of ethnic groups of West Papua Province
- List of ethnic groups of Southwest Papua Province
- Aeta people – Ethnic group of the Philippines
- Alfur people – Broad term for certain peoples of Southeast Asia
- Austronesian peoples – Speakers of Austronesian languages
- Malagasy people – Austronesian ethnic group
- Micronesians – Ethnic groups of Austronesian peoples
- Negrito – Set of ethnic groups in Southeast Asia and Andaman islands
- Ni-Vanuatu – Indigenous Melanesian people of Vanuatu
- Oceania – Continent/geographical region in the Pacific Ocean
- Indigenous people of New Guinea – Melanesian inhabitants of New Guinea
- Polynesians – Austronesian ethnolinguistic group
- Sundaland – Biogeographic region of Southeast Asia
- Torres Strait Islanders – One of the two categories of Indigenous Australians
