= HMAS Uki =

Australian WW2 auxiliary minesweeper

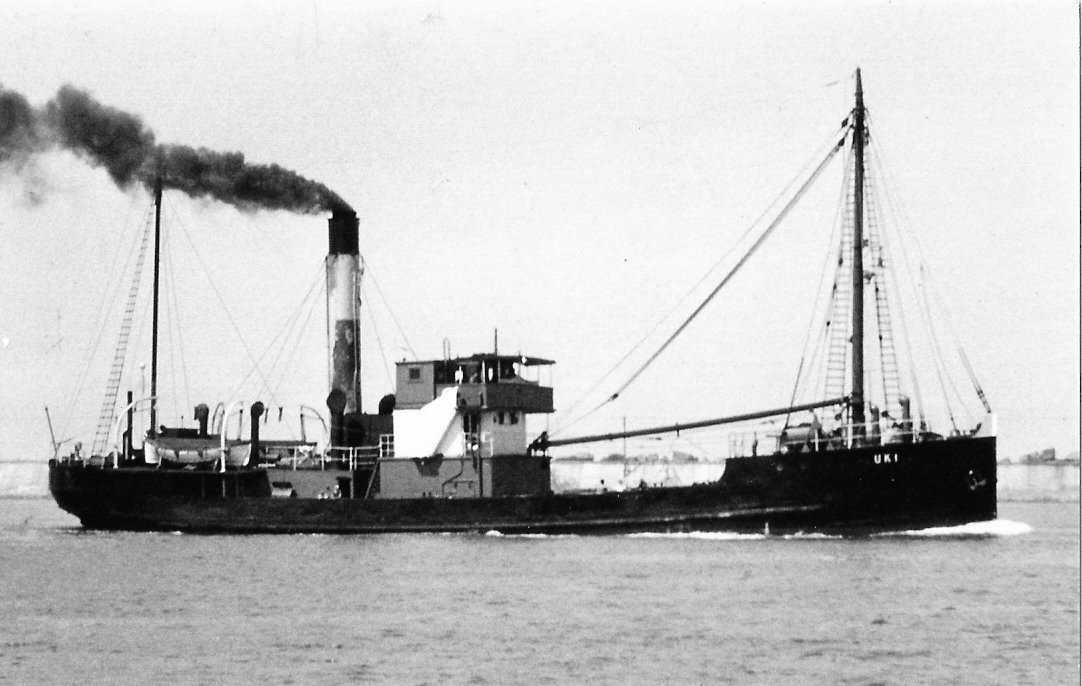

History
- Name: Uki
- Owner: North Coast Steam Navigation Company

Australia
- Name: Uki

General characteristics
- Tonnage: 545 gross register tonnage
- Length: 152.9 ft (47 m)
- Beam: 34.6 ft (11 m)
- Depth: 8.5 ft (3 m)

HMAS Uki (FY.80) was an auxiliary minesweeper operated by the Royal Australian Navy during World War II. Laid down at Lithgows, Port Glasgow, Scotland in 1923, Uki (named after the village Uki in the Tweed Valley of far northern New South Wales) was owned and operated by the Sydney-based North Coast Steam Navigation Company. On 3 November 1939, Uki was requisitioned by the RAN for use as an auxiliary.

During the war, Uki, Narani, and Bermagui made up Group 77 Minesweeper, based at HMAS Maitland, in Newcastle, New South Wales. In March 1943, Uki was requisitioned into the United States Navy.

After being returned to her owners, she was sold to M. Bern & Co in 1954. She was hulked in Brisbane in 1960. She was later stripped and scuttled off Tangalooma, Queensland in June 1976.
