= TSS Wandra =

Coordinates: 35.04521667°S 150.839183°E

History

Australia
- Name: Wandra
- Owner: Allen Taylor & Company
- Port of registry: (Australia) Sydney
- Builder: Denis Sullivan, Coopernook, New South Wales, Australia
- Completed: 1907
- Identification: Official number: 121183; Port Number: 31/1907
- Fate: Wrecked 15 December 1915

General characteristics
- Type: Wood twin screw steamer
- Tonnage: 164 tons
- Length: 120.5 ft (36.73 m)
- Beam: 26.92 ft (8.21 m)
- Draught: 5.8 ft (1.77 m)
- Propulsion: Twin screw

Wandra was a wooden twin screw steamer built in 1907, for Allen Taylor & Company, by Denis Sullivan at Coopernook, New South Wales. Her hull was towed to Sydney for her engines to be fitted by Begg and Greig.

== Fate ==
She was wrecked whilst carrying timber to Sydney from Moruya Heads and was lost approximately 500 yards (460 m) off the Drum and Drumsticks, Jervis Bay, New South Wales on 15 December 1915.

Some 5 miles (8.0 km) North of Jervis Bay lighthouse the Wandra took on water in heavy seas. They made for the Drum and Drumsticks and dropped anchor but sank straight away. The crew got off safely and made their way to the lighthouse for the night.
