= HMAS Maitland (naval base) =

- formerly HMAS Penguin (III)
- Newcastle, New South Wales in Australia

Site information
- Type: Naval base
- Operator: Royal Australian Navy

Location
- Location in New South Wales
- Coordinates: 32°55′24″S 151°48′04″E

Site history
- In use: 1 August 1940 – 21 September 1946
- Fate: Decommissioned

HMAS Maitland is a former Royal Australian Navy (RAN) shore-based naval depot located in Newcastle, New South Wales behind Horseshoe Beach and Nobbys Beach.

== Facilities ==
The depot was built alongside an army establishment known as Camp Shortland. HMAS Maitland was linked to HMAS Kuttabul, the main naval base in Sydney, and was originally known as HMAS Penguin (III). The base was renamed HMAS Maitland on 1 August 1940. Maitland had three components:

- the Australian Navy Cadets group, Training Ship Tobruk;
- Newcastle Customs House; and
- the military establishment on Shepherd's Hill.

The following ships were associated with Maitland:

- The Group 77 Minesweepers: HMAS Bermagui, HMAS Uki, and HMAS Narani; and
- The examination vessel HMAS Adele.

Maitland was decommissioned on 21 September 1946. During her operation, 56 officers and 300 sailors were trained at the facility.

== See also ==
- List of former Royal Australian Navy bases
