= John Wright and Son Shipyards =

Former shipyard in Tuncurry, Australia (1875-1958)

Coordinates: 32.178437°S 152.501267°E

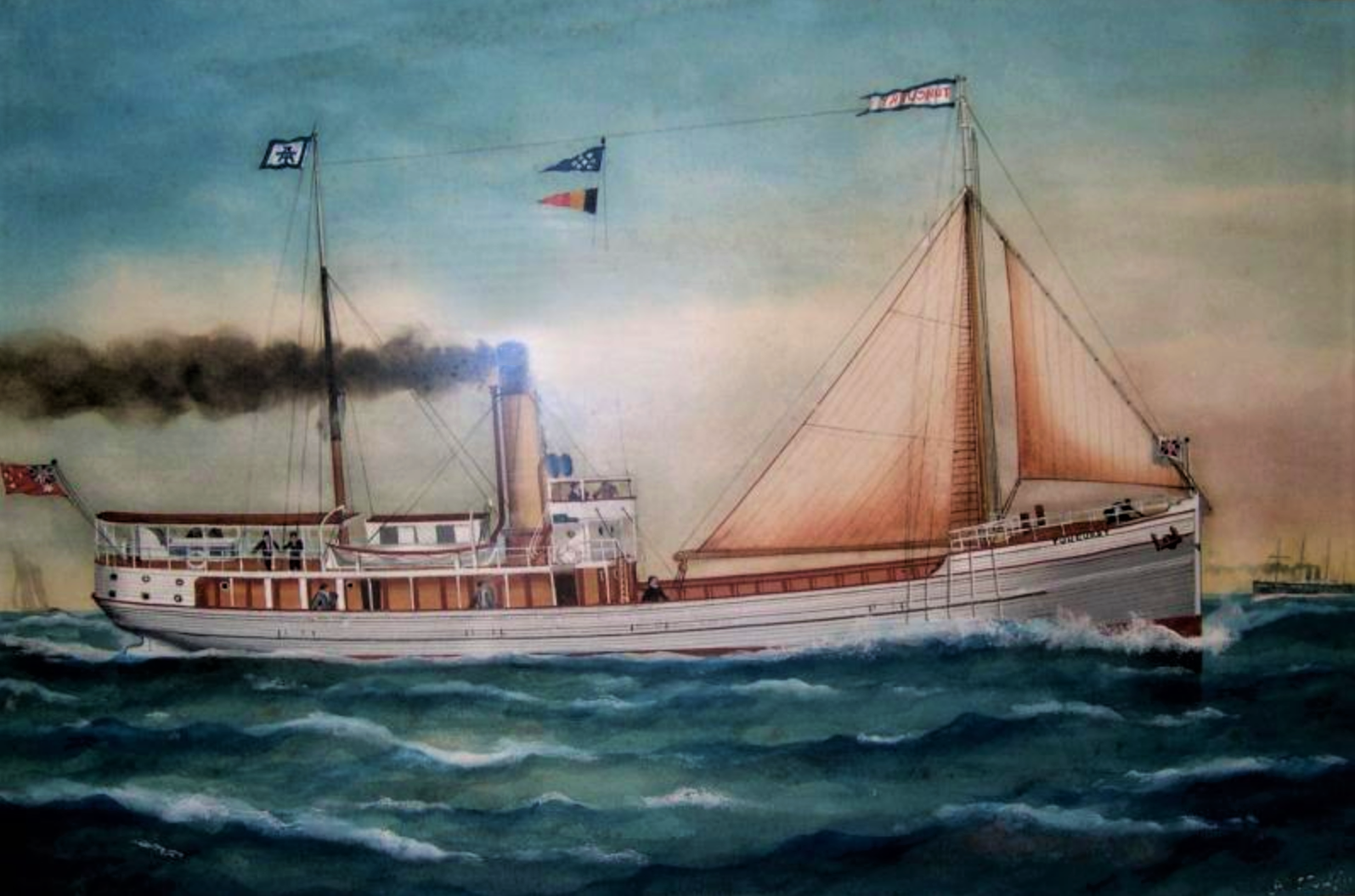
The Tuncurry II

John Wright and Son was a former shipyard located in Tuncurry, Australia between 1875 and 1958.

In partnership with Alexander Croll, John Wright built at least three ships at Bungwahl, before selling his share of the sawmill and shipwright business at Myall Lakes. In 1875, he was the first white settler of the area now known as Tuncurry. He took out a 99-year lease on the waterfront land and built a timber mill, shipyard, slipway and associated buildings.

A wharf ran about 50 feet along the length of the waterfront at Tuncurry, with a receiving shed, with a skin shed at one end which housed cattle skins to be sent to Sydney.

== Vessels ==
His first boat built at Tuncurry was the "Stanley", which carried timber to Sydney and returned with general cargo. This was replaced by the first ship named Tuncurry.

John Wright built a number of vessels used on the North Coast including the Bellinger, Tuncurry II, Our Jack and the Comboyne.

After Wright's death in 1910, his son Ernest continued the business with the building of the Narani, Wallamba, Glenreagh, Allenwood, Nambucca 1, Nambucca 2 and the Uralba. Additionally other craft were built, including small tugs, lighters, yachts and launches. The company name was changed to E. Wright & Son.

== Fate ==
The business became un-financial in the 1950s. The 99-year lease was approaching finality, and John Wright junior decided to close the shipyard and return the land to the crown. In 1960 all buildings were demolished. In February 2018, the 'US Army WT85' - 'Protrude'/'Koolya', the last of the Wright ships sunk at its mooring at Gosford.

The water front land where the mill and shipyard stood at Tuncurry was gazetted as an area for public recreation and in 1962 was renamed John Wright Park.

== Gallery ==
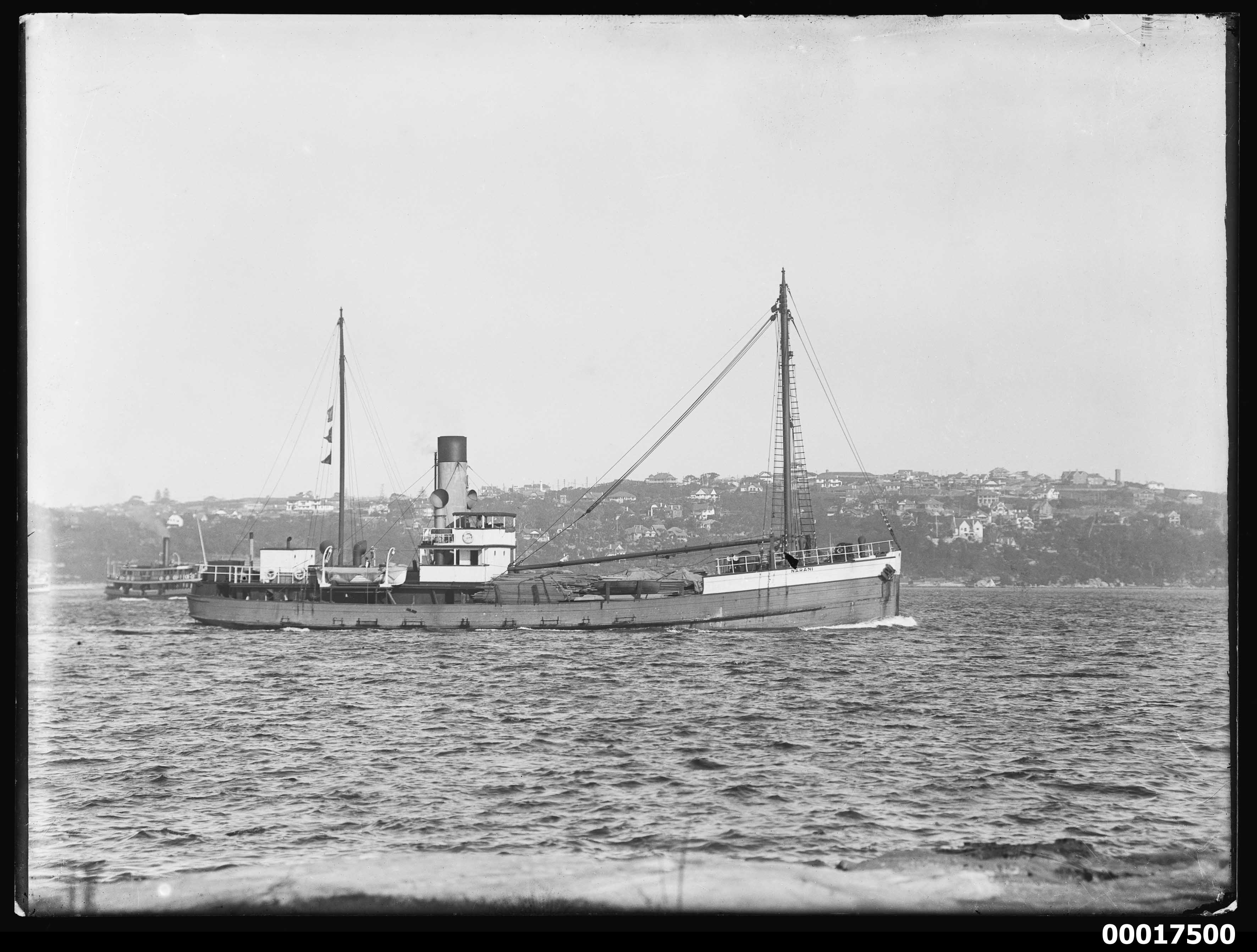
HMAS Narani

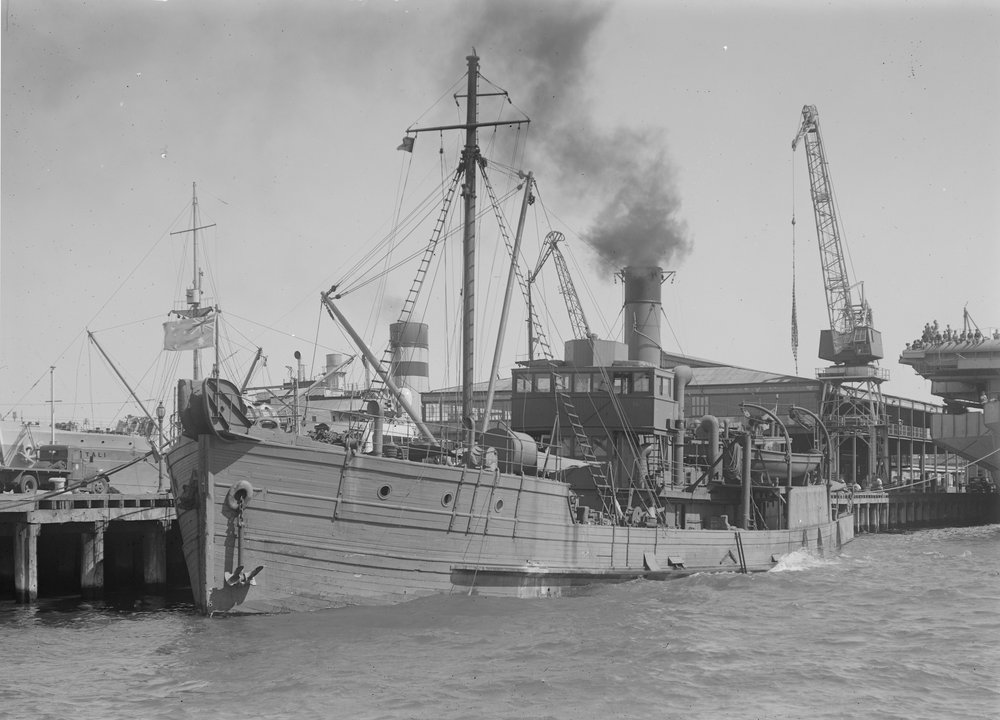
HMAS Uralba

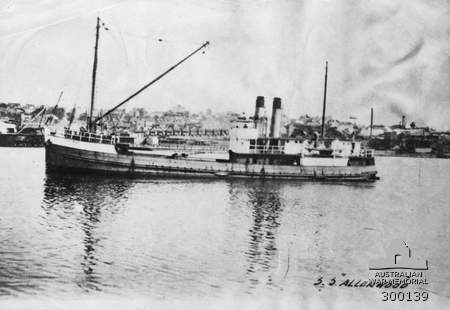
HMAS Allenwood

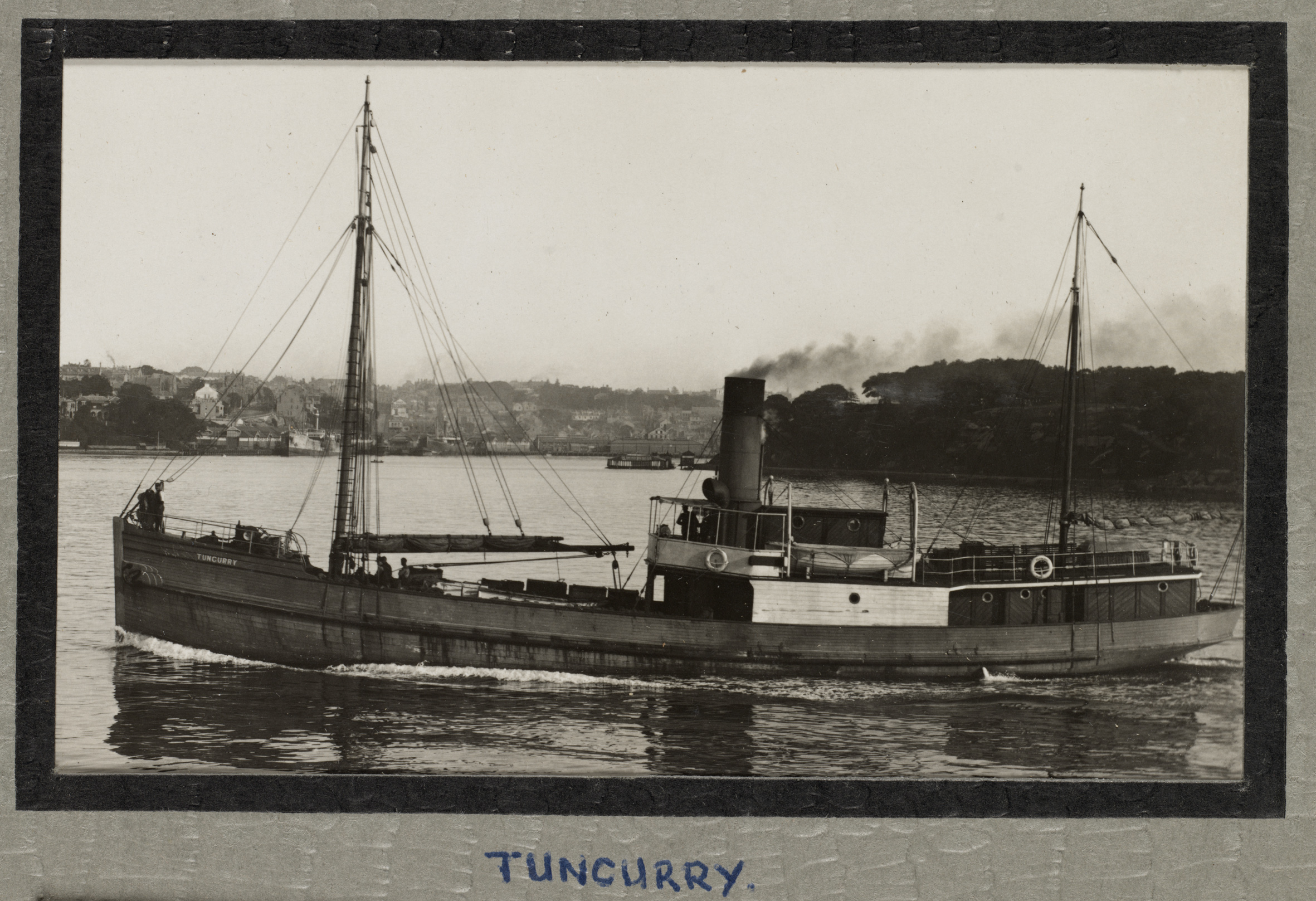
The first Tuncurry, built 1903
