= HMAS Uralba =

Auxiliary minefield tender

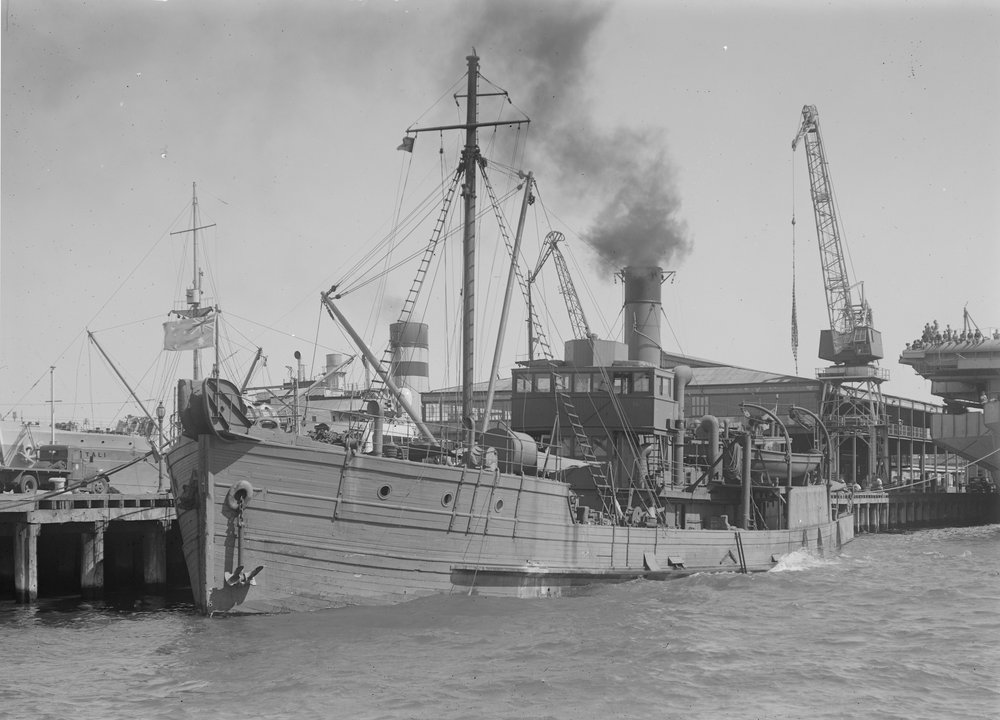
- HMAS Uralba

History

United Kingdom
- Name: Uralba
- Owner: North Coast Steam Navigation Company
- Launched: 1942
- Fate: Sunk as an artificial reef in 1971

Australia (RAN)
- Name: Uralba
- Builder: Ernest Wright, Tuncurry, New South Wales
- Commissioned: 22 November 1942

General characteristics
- Tonnage: 603 gross tonnage
- Length: 154.8 ft (47 m)
- Beam: 37 ft (11 m)
- Depth: 9.3 ft (3 m)

HMAS Uralba was an auxiliary minefield tender and armament stores carrier operated by the Royal Australian Navy (RAN) during World War II. She was launched in 1942 by Ernest Wright, Tuncurry, New South Wales as Uralba (presumably named after the North Coast of NSW locality) for the North Coast Steam Navigation Company. Requisitioned by the RAN while under construction on 13 July 1942 and commissioned on 22 November 1942. After being returned to her owners and being sold and used for a number of purposes she was sunk on 4 November 1971 to create an artificial reef off Carrum Creek, in Port Phillip Bay.

== Career ==
Her engines came from the Sydney Ferries Limited steamer, Kuramia, made redundant by the opening of the Sydney Harbour Bridge.

While she was under construction in 1942 for the North Coast Steam Navigation Company, she was requisitioned by the RAN. She was based in Brisbane as a minefield tender for a couple of years before moving to Milne Bay, New Guinea as a stores and armaments carrier. Uralba was paid off in August 1945 and returned to her owners.

For the next few years she transported timber between Melbourne and Tasmania. Uralba was sold in 1948 to the State Electricity Commission of Victoria carrying construction materials across Bass Strait for the Latrobe Valley power stations. On her return voyages she carried cars and general cargo to Tasmania.

Sold in September 1953 to the A & A Steamship Trading Syndicate of NSW and was subject to High Court of Australia seizure in 1958. Later sold to Benny Gelbart of Footscray, she sank at her moorings in the Maribyrnong River on 4 May 1960. Refloated and fixed she was sold to Duncan and Russell of Melbourne in 1964, had her engines removed and was converted into a dumb lighter.

The Victorian Fisheries and Wildlife Department sank Uralba as an artificial reef eight kilometres off Carrum Creek in Port Phillip Bay on 4 November 1971.
