= US Army WT85 Protrude =

Tug boat built in 1943 by John Wright and Son Shipyards

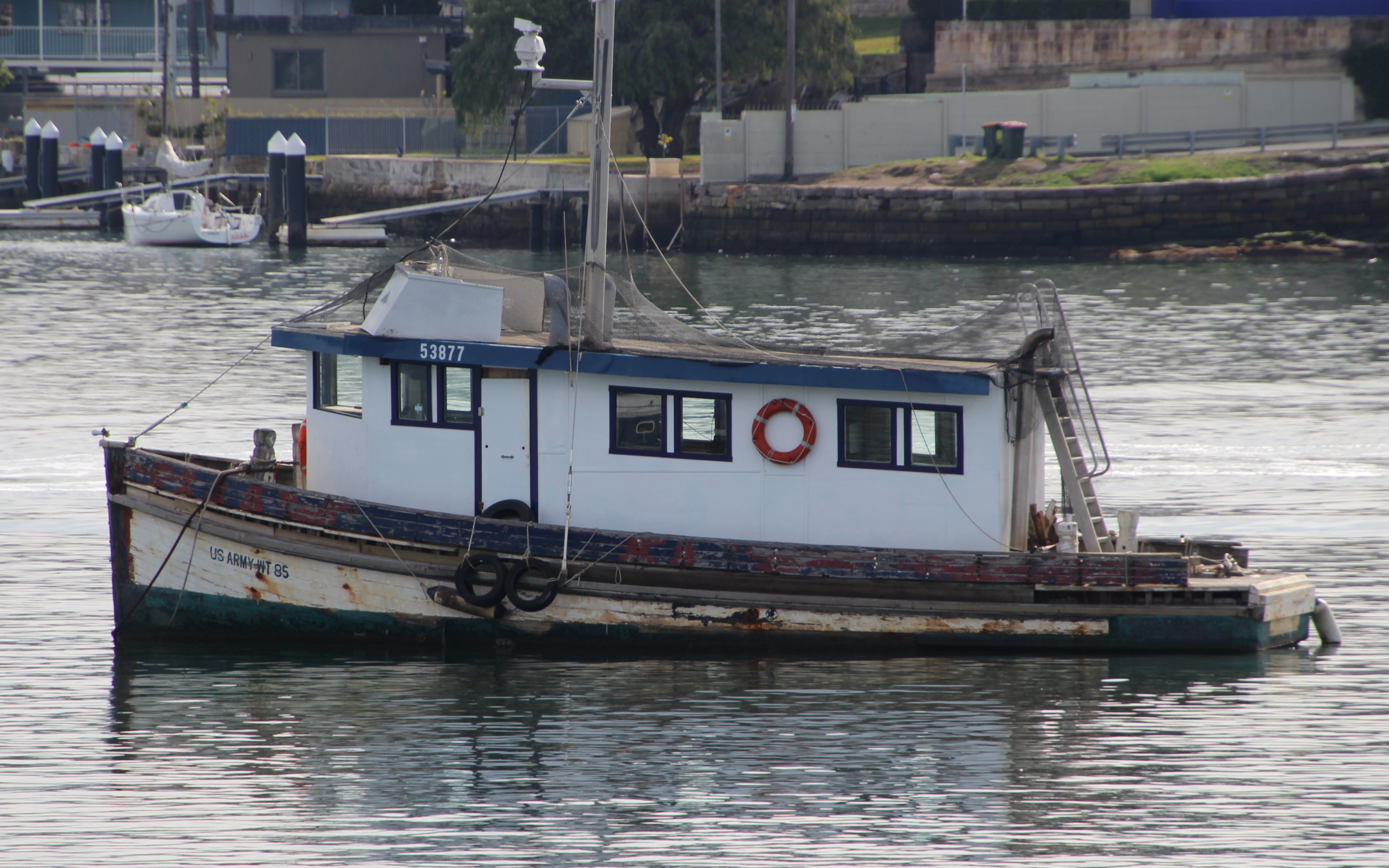
- Name: US Army WT85 Protrude
- Ordered: 1941
- Builder: John Wright and Son Shipyards
- Launched: 1943
- Completed: 1944
- Identification: 191328/53877
- Fate: ongoing restoration

General characteristics
- Type: Tugboat
- Tonnage: 18.9
- Length: 45 feet
- Beam: 15 feet
- Draught: 7 feet
- Installed power: 135 BHP Cummins Diesel. 6-cylinder
- Propulsion: single screw

US Army WT85 Protrude is a tow/tug boat built in 1943 by John Wright and Son Shipyards, in Tuncurry, Australia. After the entry of the United States in World War 2 in 1941, the United States Army ordered five 45-foot-long wooden tug/tow boats through the Ministry of Munitions. Wooden support craft were preferred over metal-hulled ships for reasons of security against mines.

The last of these was the WT85, later to be named Koolya when acquired by the Royal Australian Navy. On 24 July 1944 WT85 was taken out over the bar at Tuncurry by a local fishing boat, the Eldorado then handed over to US Army WT68. In 1948 the boat was sold to the ferry operators Nicholson Bros. Harbour Transport, and named Protrude. Other craft run by Nicholson also were named with the prefix "pro". Such as the Promise, Protex, Protest, Prolong, Promote and Proclaim.

Since the Second World War the Protrude has had many owners, roles and re-fittings. It is one of the last surviving craft built by John Wright and Son Shipyards. As of 2020, the former WT85 is moored at Elvina Bay.
