= USS YDG-5 =

US Navy vessel

History

Australia
- Name: TSS Nambucca
- Namesake: Nambucca River
- Owner: North Coast Steam Navigation Company
- Port of registry: (United Kingdom) Sydney
- Builder: Ernest Wright, Tuncurry, New South Wales
- Launched: 1936
- Fate: Requisitioned by Royal Australian Navy

Australia
- Name: HMAS Nambucca
- Acquired: 7 November 1939
- Commissioned: 10 January 1940
- Decommissioned: 19 April 1943
- Fate: Transferred to United States Navy

United States
- Name: USS YDG-5
- Acquired: 19 April 1943
- Commissioned: 31 July 1944
- Decommissioned: 8 February 1946
- Honours and awards: Asiatic-Pacific Campaign Medal; *World War II Victory Medal
- Fate: Destroyed by fire on 8 February 1946

General characteristics
- Tonnage: 489 gross tons
- Length: 153 ft (47 m)
- Beam: 35 ft 1 in (10.69 m)
- Draft: 8 ft 7 in (2.62 m)
- Installed power: 48 horsepower
- Propulsion: 4-cylinder compound engine by Campbell & Calderwood, Paisley
- Speed: 8.5 knots (15.7 km/h; 9.8 mph)
- Complement: 28
- Armament: 1 × 12-pdr and 2 × 20 mm (RAN service); 4 × 20 mm (US Navy service)

USS YDG-5 was a degaussing vessel of the United States Navy (USN) and formerly an auxiliary minesweeper operated by the Royal Australian Navy (RAN) during World War II.

She was built by Ernst Wright, Tuncurry, New South Wales and launched in 1936 for the North Coast Steam Navigation Company as the TSS Nambucca. Nambucca was requisitioned by the RAN on 7 November 1939 and converted to an auxiliary minesweeper, and commissioned on 10 January 1940 as HMAS Nambucca (NB). She formed part of Minesweeping Group 50 based in Sydney, undertaking minesweeping activities around Wilsons Promontory and Cape Otway. She was transferred to the USN on 19 April 1943.

After conversion to a degaussing vessel by Evans Deakin & Company, Brisbane, she was commissioned on 31 July 1944 as USS YDG-5. She was inspected at Okinawa by USS Black Hawk in November 1945 and declared unseaworthy and declared a total loss on 30 December 1945. She was decommissioned on 7 February 1946 and was destroyed by fire on 8 February.
