= Allen Taylor & Company =

Australian company

- Type: Subsidiary
- Industry: Timber
- Founded: 1893
- Founder: Allen Taylor
- Headquarters: Rozelle, Sydney, Australia
- Products: Timber
- Parent: Pentarch Group

Allen Taylor & Company is a timber company in Australia. Founded by Allen Taylor in 1893 in Rozelle, Sydney, it is a subsidiary of the Pentarch Group.

By the time Taylor was knighted in 1911, he was on the board of numerous companies. He was an Alderman and Mayor of the Annandale Borough, an Alderman and Lord Mayor of Sydney Municipal Council and a Member of the New South Wales Legislative Council.

In the 1970s, Allen Taylor & Company supplied timbers used in the Sydney Opera House. In April 1970 Allen Taylor & Company was taken over by Blue Metal Industries which in turn was purchased by Boral in 1982. It was most recently purchased by Allied Natural Timber Enterprises Pty Ltd, a subsidiary of the Pentarch Group in 2021.

The company owned a number of ships as part of its timber business.

Ship	Built	Builder	Service	Gross Tonnage	Notes
Ability	1910			140 tons	Scuttled in 1960.
Allenwood	1920	Ernest Wright, Tuncurry	1920–1951	398 tons	Beached upon Bird Island Beach, New South Wales in 1951 and broken up in situ.
Annandale	1899			108 tons	1907 Foundered at sea on a voyage from Sydney to Bellinger River
Australia	1897			112 tons	
Bellinger	1902			229 tons	
Boomerang	1898			228 tons	
Candidate	1885			86 tons	
Pyrmont	1903			215 tons	Wrecked near Dedele, New Guinea in April 1913.
Comboyne	1911	John Wright (Snr) & Ernst Wright, Tuncurry	1911–1920	281 tons	Wrecked off Bass Point, Shellharbour on 27 November 1920.
Croki				303 tons	
Tottie	1890			74 tons	
Wandra	1907	Denis Sullivan, Coopernook	1907–1915	164 tons	Wrecked off Drum and Drumsticks, Jervis Bay on 15 November 1915
