= Colin Dufty =

Australian rules footballer (1889–1967)

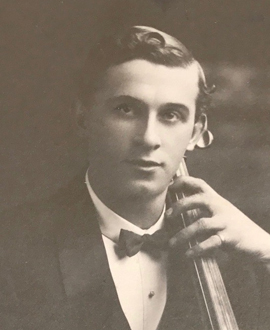
- Dufty in the 1910s

Personal information
- Full name: Colin Francis Dufty
- Born: 29 November 1889; Suva, Fiji
- Died: 9 December 1967 (aged 78); Mordialloc, Victoria
- Original team: South Yarra
- Height: 170 cm (5 ft 7 in)
- Weight: 62 kg (137 lb)

Playing career^{1}
Years	Club	Games (Goals)
1914	Collingwood	1 (1)
- ^{1} Playing statistics correct to the end of 1914.

Colin Francis Dufty (29 November 1889 – 9 December 1967), was an Australian rules footballer who played with Collingwood in the Victorian Football League (VFL).

Dufty was the son of Photographer Francis Herbert and Louisa (née Palmer) Dufty.

He later served in World War I and World War II.
