= Francis Herbert Dufty =

Australian photographer (1846–1910)

Francis Herbert Dufty II
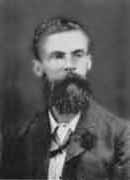
- Born: c. 1846; Kennington, Surrey, England
- Died: c. 1910 (aged 64); Melbourne, Victoria, Australia
- Occupation: Photographer
- Spouse: Louisa Palmer (m. 1883)

Francis Herbert Dufty II (c. 1846–1910), who was also known as Frank Dufty, was an English-born, Australian photographer, known for his photographs of Fiji. Dufty's contribution to Fiji was of primary importance in the 1870s, and he was one of Fiji's most significant, early photographers.

== Life ==
Francis Herbert Dufty was born in Kennington, Surrey, England, c. 1846 to Francis Herbert and Martha (née Stow) Dufty.

In 1865, Dufty and his brother, Edward, migrated to Australia. Their father and younger brother, Alfred, arrived in Melbourne, Australia, aboard the SS Great Britain in September 1868, while their mother and another brother, Walter, arrived in April 1871.

In 1883, he was married to Louisa Palmer, eldest daughter of James Palmer, of Vagadaci, Levuka, Fiji. Their son, Colin Dufty, was an Australian rules footballer who played with Collingwood in the Victorian Football League.

Dufty died in Melbourne in 1910 at the age of 64.

== Career ==
=== Australia ===
A professional photographer, Dufty, with his brother, Edward, traveled the Victorian goldfields with a horse-drawn, portable studio. His images were said to be 'the sweetest Australian scenes' photographed. In the Kyneton Directory for 1866, Dufty was listed as a 'photographic artist’ of Piper Street, Kyneton, Victoria, where he had a studio with John P. Carolin.

In June 1866, in partnership with Carolin, he produced twenty-one views of Kyneton for the 1866 Melbourne Intercolonial Exhibition. The Kyneton Guardian considered a photograph of Dutton's property as 'one of the sweetest Australian scenes we have ever seen photographed’. Three views of Victorian scenery, by Dufty and Carolin, was selected to be sent to the 1867 Paris Universal Exhibition.

Around 1865, Dufty set up the No. 3 Branch Expedition Portrait Company in Victoria with his brother, Edward. F.H. Dufty, alone, was listed in the Melbourne Directory for 1869 at 108 Elizabeth Street, Melbourne, while Edward, presumably, remained in the country.

=== Fiji ===
Annotation printed on back of Carte de visite: F. & A. Duffty. Photographers. Levuka Fiji.

At the age of 25, Dufty arrived in Levuka from Victoria in the SS Egmont in June 1871. He set up a new studio next door to the Fiji Times newspaper office on 24 May 1871. He also had a jewellery business on the same premises.

His brother, Alfred, who was 16 at the time, arrived to join him from Sydney on 29 December 1871. Alfred was out of Fiji, in Australia or New Caledonia, for extended periods of time. Most of the photographs of Fiji are attributed to Francis Dufty.

The Dufty studio produced studio portraits, street scenes, landscape photographs, and a large body of "cartes de visite", which had been popularised in Europe in the mid-19th Century. They photographed missionaries, European settlers, the Fijian hierarchy and commoners, and other people from the Pacific. Portraits were often staged, a process which facilitated the creation of Fijian stereotypes. A dealer in Fijian handicrafts, Dufty acquired a range of props which were used repeatedly.

In 1880, Dufty's landscape photograph of Fiji was exhibited at the Melbourne International Exhibition.

Alfred transferred to Suva, Fiji in 1884 or 1885 and opened a studio there. Dufty remained in Levuka until 1886 when he moved to Suva to join Alfred.

In June 1887 Alfred and his family left to return to Australia. Dufty did not remain in Suva long after, and left for Melbourne in April 1892.

== Politics – Fiji ==
Francis was very active in local affairs. He was a prominent member of the white supremacist British Subjects' Mutual Protection Society, in opposition to Cakobau's Government, and a staunch advocate of annexation to Great Britain. He was a charter member of the first Masonic lodge.

For three years he was president of the Levuka Mechanics' Institute and held various other offices.
