= Alfred William Buchanan Dufty =

Australian photographer (1858–1924)

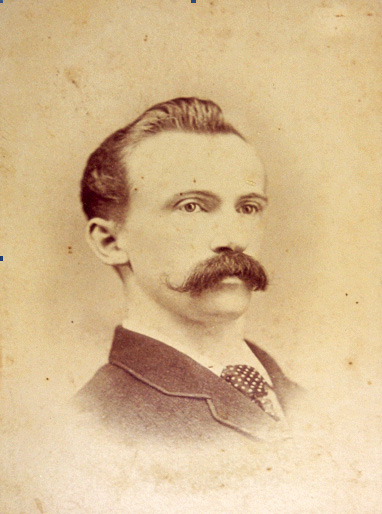
- Born: 4 March 1856. Kingston upon Thames
- Died: c. 1924 (aged 68); Sydney, New South Wales, Australia
- Occupation: Photographer
- Spouse: Susan Lilian Burt (m. 1883)

Alfred William Buchanan Dufty (1858–1924) was an English-born Australian photographer.

== Life ==
Alfred William Buchanan Dufty was born at Kingston upon Thames, England, to Francis Herbert and Martha (née Stow) Dufty on 4 March 1856. Francis was an early photographer in Bristol.

Dufty migrated to Australia with his father in September 1868, arriving in Melbourne aboard the SS Great Britain. His older brothers, Francis and Edward, had migrated to Australia in 1865, while mother Martha and son Walter arrived in April 1871.

== Career ==
=== Fiji ===
Annotation printed on back of Carte de visite: F. & A. Duffty. Photographers. Levuka Fiji.

In December 1871, at the age of 16, Dufty moved to Levuka, Fiji and joined his brother Francis Herbert Dufty who had set up a photography studio next door to the Fiji Times newspaper office on 24 May 1871.

The Dufty brothers produced studio portraits, landscape photographs and a large body of "cartes de visite", which had been popularised in Europe in the mid-19th century. They photographed missionaries, European settlers, the Fijian hierarchy that naturally gravitated to this centre of power, and even the mountaineers or Kai Colo.

Dufty was out of Fiji in Australia and New Caledonia for extended periods of time and learned to speak fluent French in Noumea.

In 1883 Dufty married Susan Lilian Burt in Victoria, Australia. He transferred to Suva, Fiji in 1884 or 1885 and opened a studio. Frank moved to Suva in June 1887 just as Alfred and his family left to return to Australia. Dufty found that there were too many photographers by the name of Dufty in the Fiji area so he came back to Australia. Francis did not remain in Fiji long either, and left for Melbourne in April 1892.

=== Australia ===
Alfred had a newsagent and stationery shop in Melbourne, during which time he acted as agent for several Fijian businesses. He subsequently removed to Sydney with his large family (six sons), and in 1906 resumed his career as a photographer, setting up a marine photography studio in Erskine Street that he ran very successfully for the next twenty years until his death at the age of 68, in 1924. His son Roy took over the business on his father's retirement and ran it for a further five years.
