= HMAS Bermagui =

History
- Name: Bermagui
- Owner: Illawarra & South Coast Steam Navigation Company
- Builder: Ailsa Shipbuilding Company, Troon, Scotland
- Launched: 1912
- Fate: Sunk as artificial reef

History

Australia
- Commissioned: 11 December 1939
- Decommissioned: 23 November 1945

General characteristics
- Class & type: Minesweeper
- Displacement: 402 gross tonnage
- Length: 144 ft (44 m)
- Beam: 32.1 ft (10 m)
- Draught: 8.2 ft (2 m)
- Armament: 1 × 12-pounder gun; 1 × .303 cal. Vickers machine gun; 4 × Type D depth charges

HMAS Bermagui was a 402-ton auxiliary minesweeper operated by the Royal Australian Navy (RAN) during World War II.

HMAS Bermagui was laid down by the Ailsa Shipbuilding Company, Troon, Scotland in 1912 for the Illawarra & South Coast Steam Navigation Company. In December 1939, the ship was requisitioned by the RAN as an auxiliary, and was commissioned on 11 December. She was fitted with one 12-pounder 12cwt QF gun, one .303 inch Vickers machine gun, and four Type D depth charges.

During the war, Bermagui was attached to the naval base HMAS Maitland in Newcastle, New South Wales and served as an auxiliary minesweeper, boom defence vessel, and minefield tender.

The ship was paid off from service on 23 November 1945 and returned to her civilian owners on 22 July 1946. She was sold in 1951 to Lumber Operators Pty Ltd and in 1954 to Allen Taylor & Co. as a timber transport vessel. She was later sold in 1961 and converted into a gravel barge and used on the Brisbane River until 1979. She was scuttled off Tangalooma, Queensland as part of an artificial reef for snorkeling.
