= HMAS Allenwood =

Royal Australian Navy WWII minesweeper

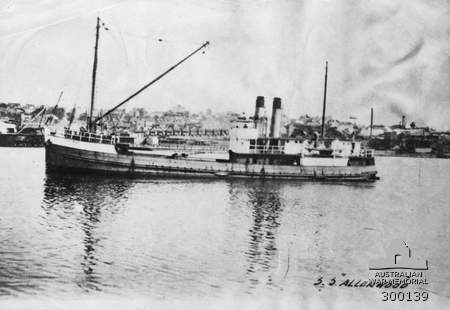
- Allenwood c. 1941, prior to entering naval service

History

Australia
- Name: Allenwood
- Owner: Allen Taylor and Co. Ltd
- Builder: Ernest Wright, Tuncurry, New South Wales
- Launched: 1920
- Fate: Beached upon Birdie Beach, Munmorah National Park, New South Wales and broken up in situ.

Australia
- Name: Allenwood
- Acquired: 27 July 1941
- Commissioned: 16 September 1941
- Decommissioned: 31 November 1944
- Fate: Returned to owners on 1 October 1946

General characteristics
- Tonnage: 398 Gross register tonnage
- Length: 147 ft (45 m)
- Beam: 35 ft (11 m)
- Depth: 8.2 ft (2 m)
- Armament: 1 × 12-pounder gun; 1 × 20mm Oerlikon cannon; 1 × .303-inch Vickers machine gun

HMAS Allenwood (FY18) was an auxiliary minesweeper operated by the Royal Australian Navy (RAN) during World War II. She was launched in 1920 by Ernst Wright at Tuncurry, New South Wales, Australia as Allenwood for Allen Taylor and Co. Ltd. The ship operated along the east coast of Australia, and was requisitioned by the RAN on 27 July 1941. She was returned to her owners in 1946 before being wrecked near Norah Head on 14 September 1951.

== Operational history ==
Allenwood operated along the east coast of Australia in the coastal trade for Allen Taylor and Co. Ltd. On 16 September 1941, Allenwood was requisitioned by the RAN on 27 July 1941 for use as an auxiliary and fitted out. She was commissioned on 16 September 1941. During the war, Allenwood was based in Sydney. She was paid off 31 October 1944 and returned to the owner, Allen Taylor & Co Ltd on 1 October 1946.

== Fate ==
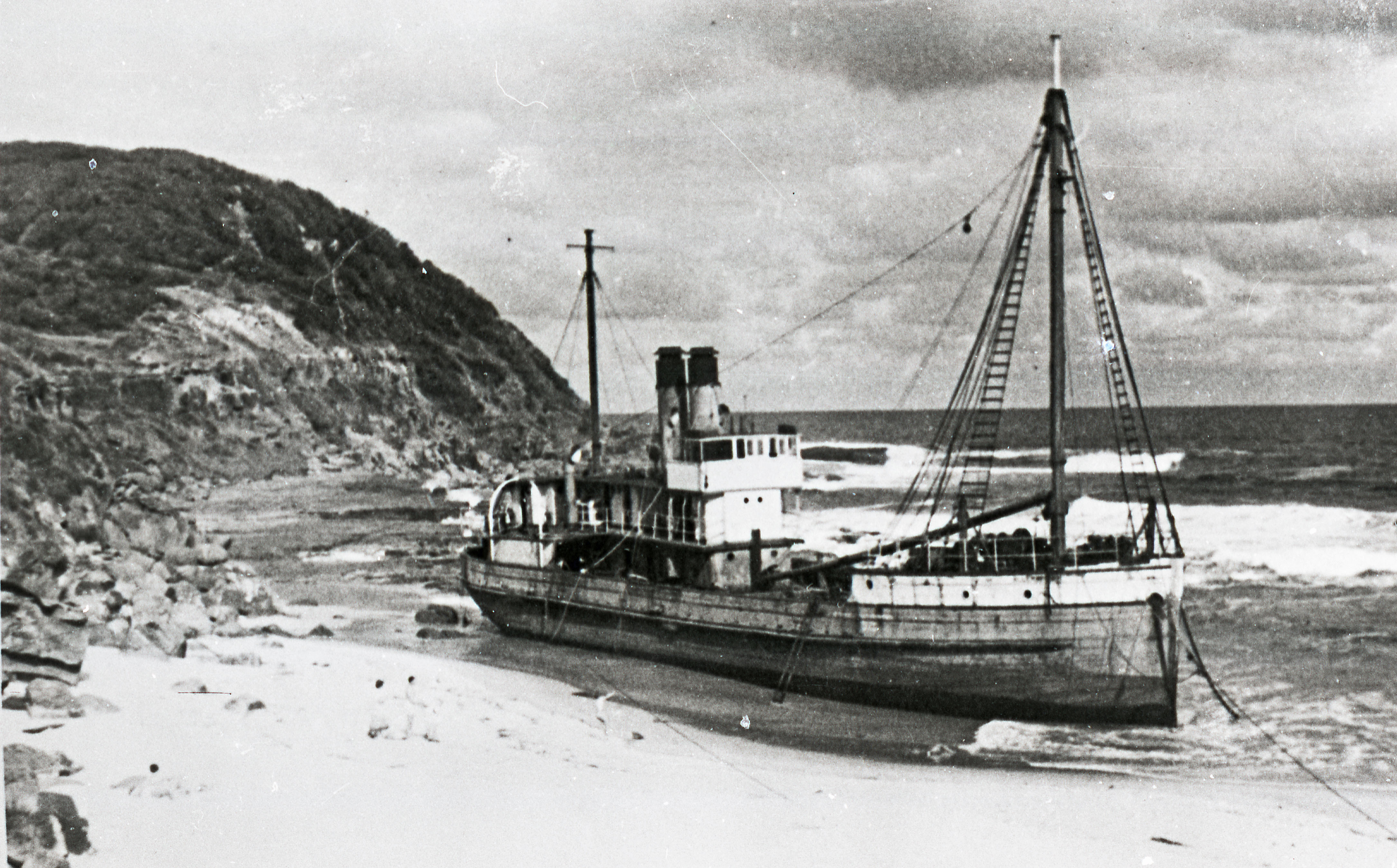
Allenwood aground

On 14 September 1951, under the command of Captain Boutrup, Allenwood ran aground on a sandbank at Birdie Beach, Munmorah National Park, north of Norah Head, New South Wales33.202186°S 151.613235°E, in foggy conditions. The vessel could not be removed from the sandbank and was sold for £601 and dismantled in situ.
