= John Wright (shipbuilder-sawmiller) =

Australian businessman

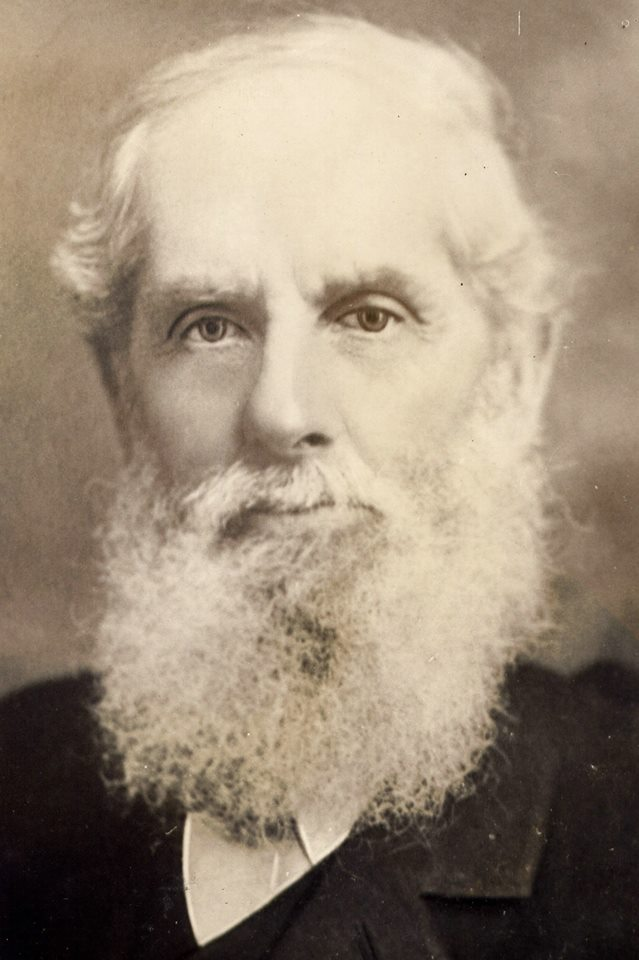
- John Wright at Tuncurry
- Born: 21 May 1835; Nether Dallachy, Banff, Parish of Bellie, Scotland, United Kingdom
- Died: 28 May 1910 (aged 75); Tuncurry, New South Wales
- Occupation: Businessman
- Known for: Shipbuider & sawmiller
- Spouse: Catherine Gill (m. 1864; died 1910)
- Children: 11

John Wright was a 19th-century Australian shipbuilder, sawmiller and businessman.

== Biography ==
In 1875, John Wright was the first white settler in Tuncurry, Australia. Born in Scotland, he arrived in Australia on Lord Worsley in May 1860. John Wright and Son Shipyards was a successful business until 1958.

Wright adopted the local Worimi Aboriginal place name "Tuncurry" for the area north of Forster, which is said to mean "plenty fish". The Worimi people called John Wright "big boss" and "first fella". Before settling in Tuncurry, Wright sold his share of a sawmilling and shipwright business with Alexander Croll at Bungwahl on the Myall Lakes.

Wright's son Ernest was the first white child born in Tuncurry. Ernest successfully continued the shipbuilding business after John's death. Another son, Sidney Garden Wright managed a large sawmill known as Avalon Mill near Krambach. Sidney married a granddaughter of Joseph Smith, the founder of Mormonism. They had ten children in the Mid North Coast area near Tuncurry.

The water front land where the mill and shipyard stood at Tuncurry was gazetted as an area for public recreation and in 1962 was renamed John Wright Park.
