= Screw steamer =

Steam-powered ship with propellers

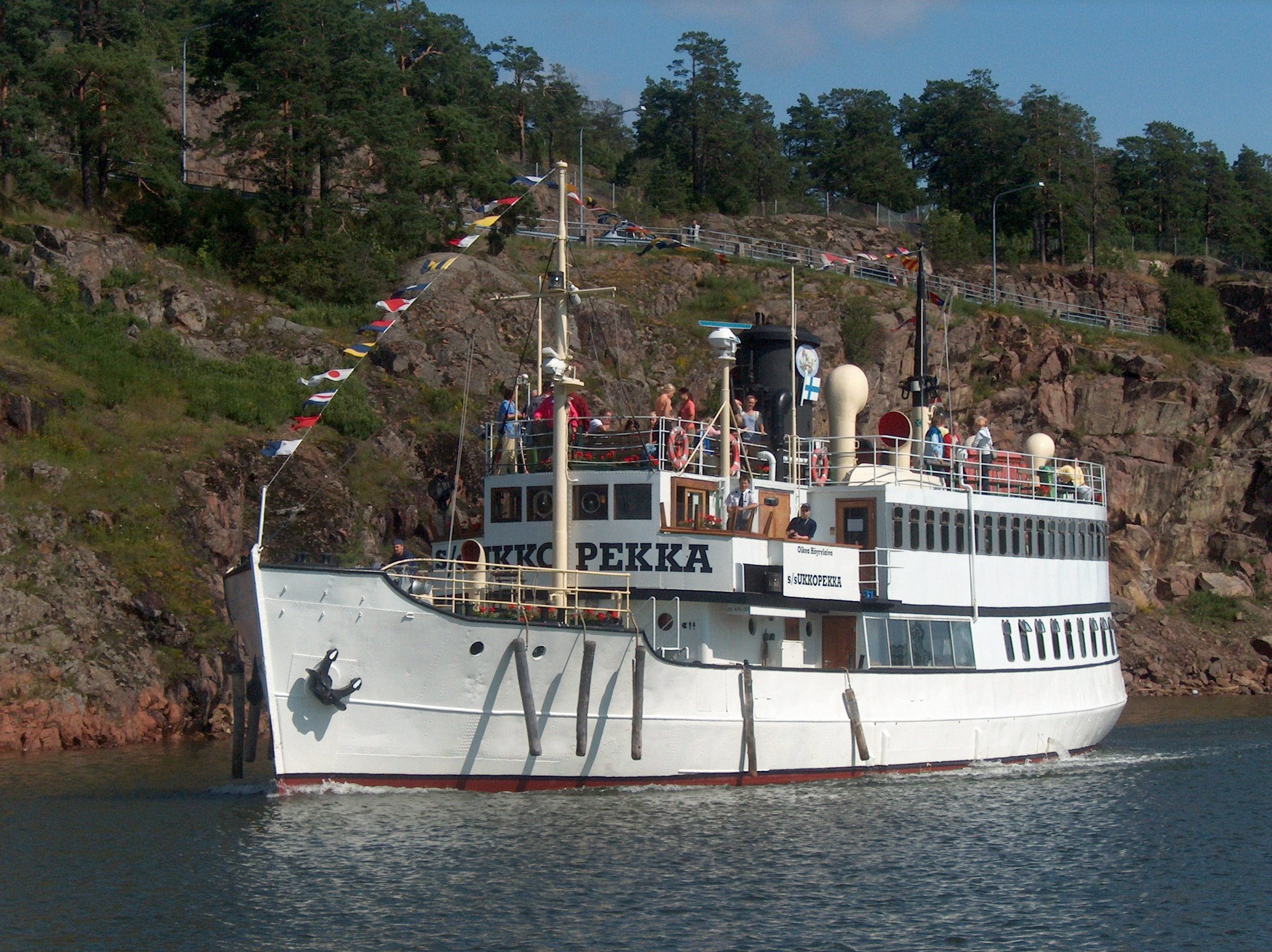
The SS Ukkopekka, a Finnish screw steamer

A screw steamer or screw steamship (abbreviated "SS") is an old term for a steamship or steamboat powered by a steam engine, using one or more propellers (also known as screws) to propel it through the water. Such a ship was also known as an "iron screw steam ship".

In the 19th century, this designation was normally used in contradistinction to the paddle steamer, a still earlier form of steamship that was largely, but not entirely, superseded by the screw steamer.

Many famous ships were screw steamers, including the RMS Titanic and RMS Lusitania. These massive leviathans had three or four propellers. Ships under two hundred meters in length usually only had two or one propellers.

== Development ==
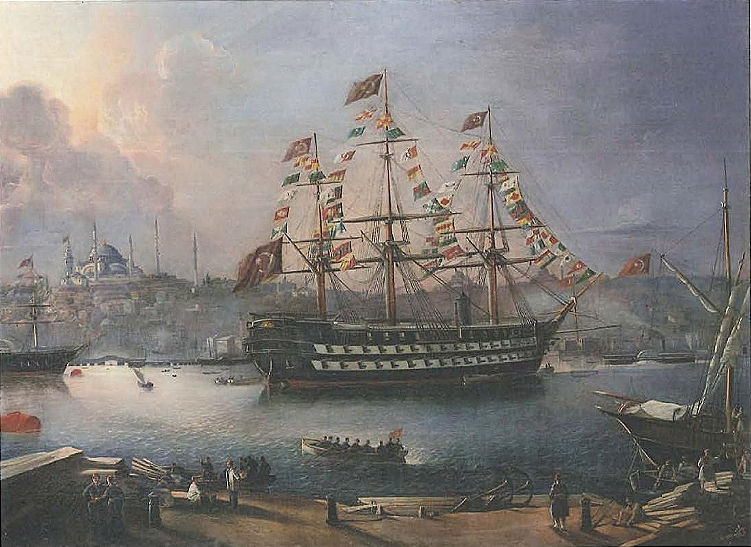
Şadiye, the Screw Ship of the Line, by Hovhannes Umed Behzad (1867), Istanbul, Ottoman Empire

Following a number of smaller experimental boats and ships in the mid and late 1830s, the first screw powered ocean-going ship was the British SS Archimedes of 1839, using a propeller designed by Francis Pettit Smith based on his 1835 patent.

In 1844, Thomas Clyde partnered with British-based Swedish inventor John Ericsson to apply his screw-propeller to steam vessels. After several experimental versions, Clyde launched the twin-screw propeller steamer John S. McKim, making it the first screw steamer built in the United States for commercial use.

== See also ==
- List of ships

== Bibliography ==
- Canney, Donald L. (1998). Lincoln's Navy: The Ships, Men and Organization, 1861-65. Naval Institute Press. pp. 232. ISBN 9781557505194. "screw steamer."
