= Carrington (name) =

Carrington and Carington are surnames originating from one of the Carringtons in England, or from the town of Carentan in Normandy, France. It is also rarely a given name.

== Surname ==
=== Scientists ===
- Alan Carrington (1934–2013), British chemist
- Benjamin Carrington (1827–1893), British botanist
- Richard Christopher Carrington (1826–1875), British astronomer

=== Soldiers, politicians, diplomats and jurists ===
- Charles Carrington (British Army officer) (1897–1990), soldier, professor, and biographer of Rudyard Kipling
- Codrington Edmund Carrington (1769–1849), English barrister, 1st Chief Justice of Ceylon and Member of Parliament
- Edward Carrington (1748–1810), American soldier and statesman
- Edwin Carrington, ambassador to and former Secretary-General of the Caribbean Community (1992–2010) from Trinidad and Tobago
- Major-General Sir Frederick Carrington (1844–1913), British army officer
- George Carrington (1711-1785), British merchant, planter and legislator in the Colony of Virginia
- Harold Carrington (1882–1964), British Army General
- Henry B. Carrington (1824–1912), American Civil War brigadier general, lawyer, professor and author
- James M. Carrington (1904–1995), American politician
- John Carrington (judge) (1847–1913), British jurist, Solicitor General of Barbados, Chief Justice of St Lucia and Tobago, Attorney General of British Guiana and Chief Justice of Hong Kong
- John H. Carrington (1934–2017), American politician
- Matthew Carrington, Baron Carrington of Fulham (born 1947), British politician
- Paul Carrington (judge) (1733–c. 1826), Virginia planter, patriot, legislator and appellate judge
- Peter Carington, 6th Baron Carrington (1919–2018), British former politician and Secretary-General of NATO
- Robert Carrington, 2nd Baron Carrington (1796–1868), British politician
- Rupert Carington, 4th Baron Carrington (1852–1929), British politician
- Walter Carrington (1930–2020), American diplomat and ambassador
- William Carington (1845–1914), British soldier, politician and courtier

=== Religious figures ===
- Albert Carrington, (1813–1889), American apostle and member of the Quorum of the Twelve Apostles in The Church of Jesus Christ of Latter-day Saints
- John F. Carrington (1914–1985), English missionary and expert on drum language
- Philip Carrington (1892–1975), Anglican priest and author, Bishop of Quebec and Metropolitan of Canada
- Vernon Carrington (1936–2005), Jamaican religious leader, founder of the Twelve Tribes of Israel branch of the Rastafari movement

=== Artists and entertainers ===
- Debbie Lee Carrington (1959–2018), American actress and stuntwoman
- Desmond Carrington (1926–2017), British radio personality and actor
- Dora Carrington or simply "Carrington" (1893–1932), British artist
- Elaine Sterne Carrington (1891–1958), American screenwriter, playwright, novelist and short story author
- Herbert Carrington, pseudonym of composer Montague Ewing (1890–1957)
- Joanna Carrington (1931–2003), British artist
- Leonora Carrington (1917–2011), English-Mexican artist and novelist
- Michael Carrington (voice actor), American comic writer and voice actor
- Nicholas Toms Carrington (1777–1830), English poet
- Rebecca Carrington (born 1971), British musician and comedian
- Rodney Carrington (born 1968), American stand-up comic, actor and musician
- Terri Lyne Carrington (born 1965), American jazz drummer, composer, singer, record producer and entrepreneur
- Raymond C. Carrington (born 1930) American sculptor

=== Athletes ===
- Bob Carrington (born 1953), American basketball player
- Bub Carrington (born 2005), American basketball player
- Darren Carrington (born 1966), American football player
- DiJonai Carrington (born 1998), American basketball player
- Elijah Carrington (1914–1998), English cricketer
- Khadeen Carrington (born 1995), Israeli-Trinidadian-American basketball player for Hapoel Jerusalem of the Israeli Basketball Premier League
- Lisa Carrington (born 1989), New Zealand sprint canoeist
- Mark Carrington (cricketer) (born 1961), New Zealand cricketer
- Mark Carrington (footballer) (born 1987), English footballer
- Paul Carrington (American football) (born 1982), American football player

=== In media ===
- Fitzroy Carrington (1869–1954), English-American editor
- Hereward Carrington (1880–1958), British author and investigator of spiritualism
- Michael Carrington (television executive) (born 1961), Australian broadcast executive
- Tom Carrington (illustrator) (1843–1918), journalist, political cartoonist and illustrator in colonial Australia
- Jim Carrington (children's author), (born 1977)

=== Other ===
- Dorothy Carrington (1910–2002), expatriate British writer about and scholar of Corsica
- Edith Carrington (1853–1929), English animal rights activist and writer
- Kelly Carrington, American model
- Matthew Carrington (1983–2005), student killed during a hazing incident, prompting Matt's Law
- Roger Clifford Carrington (1906–1971), classical scholar, archaeologist and teacher.
- William Carrington (1904-1975), English accountant

=== Pen name ===
- Charles Carrington (1867–1921), British publisher of erotic literature born Paul Harry Ferdinando
- Tori Carrington, American writing team of romance novels

=== Fictional characters ===
- Carrington family, core family of the American soap opera Dynasty
  - Adam Carrington
  - Alexis Carrington
  - Amanda Carrington
  - Ben Carrington
  - Blake Carrington
  - Claudia Carrington
  - Dana Waring Carrington
  - Danny Carrington
  - Fallon Carrington
  - Krystina Carrington
  - Krystle Carrington
  - Leslie Carrington
  - Sammy Jo Carrington
  - Steven Carrington
  - Tom Carrington
- Arthur Carrington, in the 1951 science-fiction movie The Thing From Another World
- Daniel Carrington, in the video game franchise Perfect Dark
- Mayor Carrington, in the 1993 television series Mighty Morphin Power Rangers
- Michael Carrington, in the 1982 movie Grease 2

== Given name ==
- Carrington Garland (born 1964), American actress
- Carrington T. Marshall (1869–1958), American lawyer, Chief Justice of the Ohio Supreme Court and a judge at the Nuremberg Trials
- Carrington Smedley (1808–1895), politician in the colony of South Australia
- C. B. Williams (1889–1991), British entomologist

== See also ==
- Charles Wynn-Carington, 1st Marquess of Lincolnshire (1843–1928), British politician, Governor of New South Wales
