= Robert Dawson Esq. =

English company agent

Robert Dawson
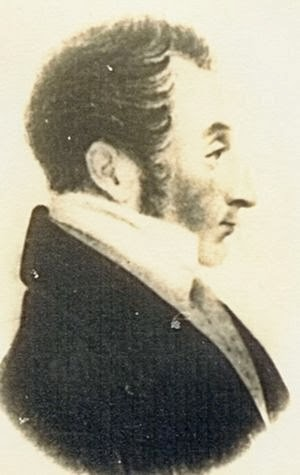
- Born: 1782; Great Bentley, Essex, England
- Died: 1866; Greenwich, England
- Known for: company agent, pastoralist, writer
- Spouse: Anne Taylor

Robert Dawson (1782–1866) was a company agent and pastoralist in New South Wales in the early part of the nineteenth century. He was born in Essex, England and was the youngest son of Joseph Dawson. Dawson was working in England as the estate manager for Viscount Barrington's estate, Becket, when he was approached by John Macarthur junior, an old school friend, to apply for the post of chief agent in New South Wales for the newly formed Australian Agricultural Co. (AA Co.) in which he was to establish and administer a pastoral grant of 1,000,000 acres (404,686 ha) subject to a committee resident there. The AA co. appointed Robert Dawson as their chief agent and appointed a Colonial Committee to assist him. This committee was entrusted by the directors in England with 'extensive discretionary powers'. Dawson was advised to accept their advice at all times. However the committee effectively included just three people, all members of the same family - James Macarthur (fourth son of John Macarthur), his cousin Hannibal Macarthur and his brother-in-law, Principal Surgeon, James Bowman. Dawson had several disagreements with the colonial committee as soon he arrived in Australia in 1825 and as such was maligned by the committee. Dawson received very little help from the committee and as such did most of the work managing the AA Co. affairs himself. The committee members and their acquaintances sold Dawson questionable sheep with foot rot and other diseases as well as older ewes that could not raise lambs. Dawson eventually refused to buy any more stock from the committee and so they set about to have him dismissed. The committee were successful in having Dawson dismissed but they were also dismissed and their reputations damaged. Dawson returned to NSW in 1839 with his second wife to superintend his estate and was appointed as magistrate for the area.

== Legacy ==
As a result of and during his work as the chief agent, Dawson built and named many places and rivers in the area including Barrington, Carrington, Gloucester, Karuah, Stroud, Tahlee, and the Barrington and Manning rivers. Robert Dawson had a very good relationship with the local Worimi Aboriginal people and his own staff and the convicts appointed to him as he was a man with great humility and compassion. He was highly regarded by the AA Co. directors in England as the reports they had heard from his progress and achievements in Australia were highly commendable. This led to him publishing his second book, "The Present State of Australia; a Description of the Country, its Advantages and Prospects with Reference to Emigration: and a Particular Account of its Aboriginal Inhabitants". It was this book that he left a lasting legacy as not only it was in part the story of the establishment of the Australian Agricultural Company, but it also a fundamental resource book on New England’s Aboriginal peoples. Dawson liked them, respected them and employed them.

== See also ==
- Tahlee heritage-listed former pastoral property
