= Tahlee, New South Wales =

Tahlee
- Suburb
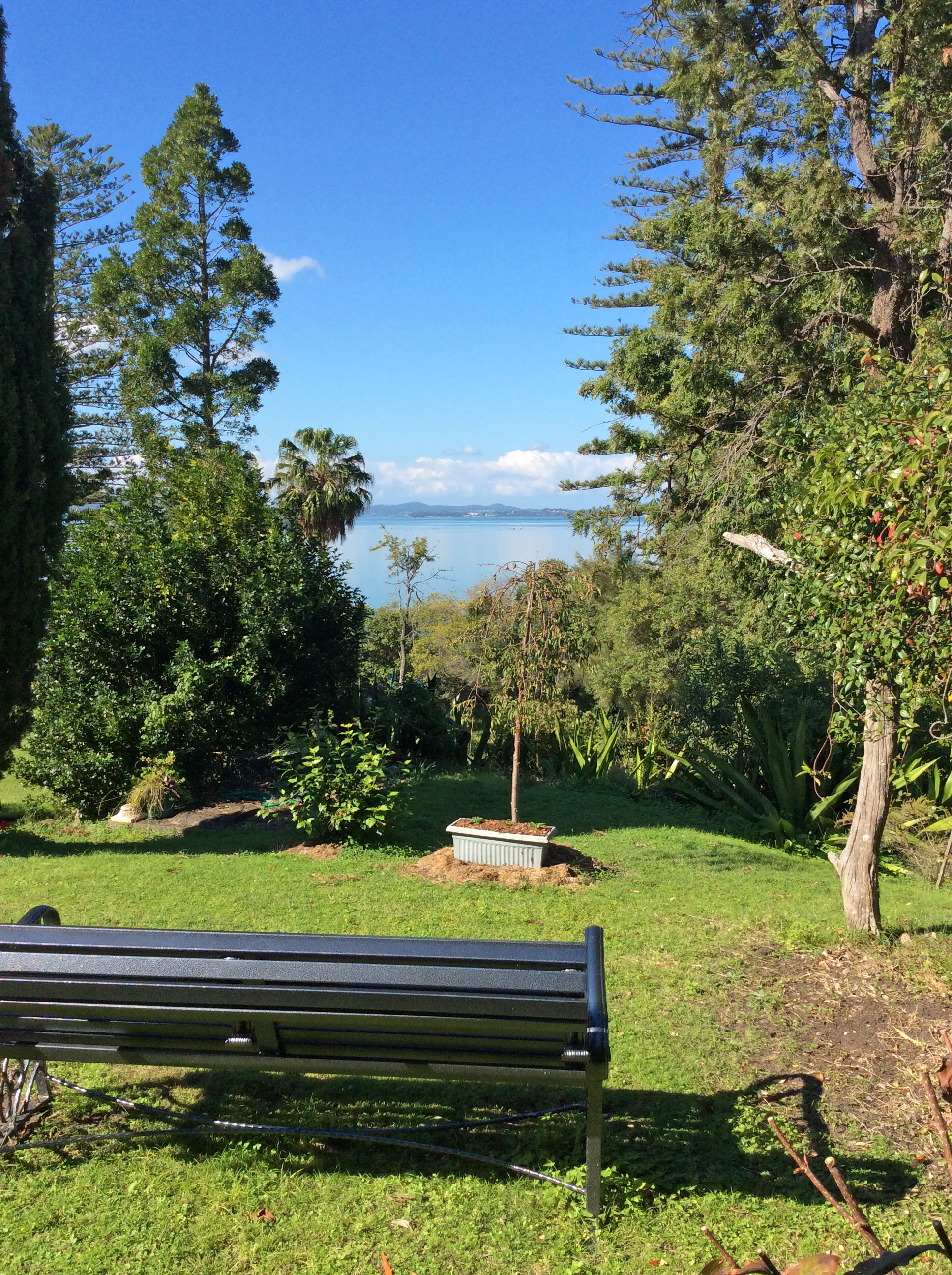
- Tahlee, 2017

- Coordinates: 32°39′38″S 152°00′07″E
- Country: Australia
- State: New South Wales
- Region: Hunter, Mid North Coast
- LGA: Mid-Coast Council
- Location: 205 km (127 mi) NNE of Sydney; 66 km (41 mi) NNE of Newcastle; 108 km (67 mi) SSW of Forster-Tuncurry; 21 km (13 mi) WSW of Tea Gardens; 41 km (25 mi) SW of Bulahdelah
- Established: 1826

Government
  - State electorate: Port Stephens
  - Federal division: Lyne

Area^{Note1}
  - Total: 3 km^{2} (1.2 sq mi)
- Elevation: 7 m (23 ft)

Population
  - Total: 28 (SAL 2021)
- Time zone: UTC+10 (AEST)
  - Summer (DST): UTC+11 (AEDT)
- Postcode: 2324
- County: Gloucester
- Parish: Carrington
- Mean max temp: 27.3 °C (81.1 °F)
- Mean min temp: 8.4 °C (47.1 °F)
- Annual rainfall: 1,348.9 mm (53.11 in)
Suburbs around Tahlee
Karuah	Karuah	Karuah
Karuah	Tahlee	Carrington
Port Stephens	Port Stephens	Port Stephens

Tahlee is a suburb of the Mid-Coast Council local government area in the Hunter and Mid North Coast regions of New South Wales, Australia, located on the northern shores of Port Stephens. The suburb is sparsely populated with the only significant population centre being the historic pastoral property of Tahlee, from which the suburb takes its name. The remainder of the suburb is primarily undeveloped bushland.

== History ==
=== Earliest inhabitants ===
The earliest inhabitants of this area were the Worimi people. Tahlee comes from the local Aboriginal word, Tarlee, meaning "sheltered from the wind and above water". Early relationships between the original inhabitants and white settlers were relatively harmonious. In fact, the Australian Agricultural Company (AA Co) would not have succeeded without their help. Tahlee's history since the AA Co's first settlers arrived in 1826 has been inextricably linked to the property of Tahlee, which is located at the southeastern corner of the suburb, adjacent to Port Stephens.

=== The Australian Agricultural Company ===
The Australian Agricultural Company was founded in 1824, through an Act of the British Parliament, with the right to select 1,000,000 acres (4,047 km^{2}) of land in the colony of New South Wales, for agricultural development. After initial criticisms of the company's Sydney committee over their lack of enthusiasm in finding a suitable location to use as the company's base, the Port Stephens area was decided on after Robert Dawson, the company's first commissioner, arrived in Sydney on 23 December 1825 with stock, plant and equipment for the new settlement. Port Stephens had been recommended by John Oxley, the Surveyor General of New South Wales, after the AA Co's committee had insisted on a base near the coast, where shipping facilities were available. On 1 January 1826 Dawson set out to explore Port Stephens, eventually deciding on the present site of Tahlee and Carrington as a suitable place for his headquarters.

During his time as commissioner, Dawson began work on Tahlee House, the home of the AA Co's first four commissioners. Nearby, a site was chosen for a township, which Mr. Dawson renamed Carrington. Robert Dawson led the AA Co until 1828 when the committee replaced him with his assistant, Mr. James Ebsworth, in an interim capacity.

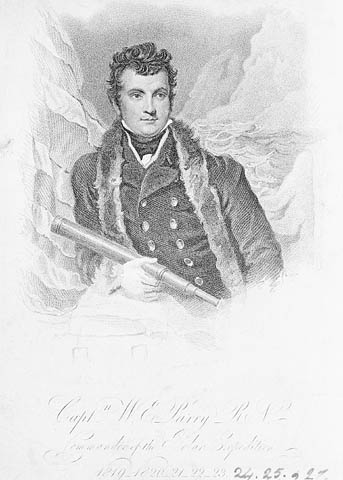
William Edward Parry

Sir William Edward Parry, the Arctic explorer and hydrographer, became the next commissioner of the AA Co in 1829 and arrived at Tahlee in March 1830. His five-year tenure was marked by progress and social reformation. Parry was a devout Christian. When he discovered that the settlement lacked a church, he conducted his own Sunday service in the carpenter's shop at Carrington.

Lt-Colonel Henry Dumaresq, who had been Governor Darling's assistant, became the next commissioner in 1834. He served until his death in 1838, when Mr. James Ebsworth took over again as interim commissioner. Mr. Ebsworth opposed a proposal by the company's English directors to subdivide the land into small parcels. Port Stephens would be a different place today if the plan had succeeded.

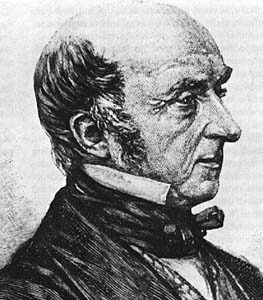
Phillip Parker King

Captain Phillip Parker King was the final AA Co commissioner to live in Tahlee House. By then, the Company's directors had realised the land was unsuitable for grazing and chose to relocate its headquarters to Stroud. The Australian Agricultural Company’s chapter of Tahlee’s history closed with the end of his appointment in 1849.

=== After the Australian Agricultural Company ===
Mr. Frederick Manton, from Sydney, purchased the Tahlee property from the AA Co in 1854 for £2,500. However, the house burned down in 1860, leaving only the walls.

=== The White era ===
In 1880 Robert Hoddle Driberg White discovered he had come into a fortune when his grandmother left him considerable property in Melbourne. However, the matter had been kept a secret from him for 13 years. The subsequent court case brought him enormous wealth and notoriety. On returning to Port Stephens, Mr. White was invited to stand for Parliament and was elected for the seat of Gloucester. It was during this time that he purchased Tahlee for £850.

Considerable development took place during this period. Improvements and extensions were added to Tahlee House. Twelve full-time gardeners were employed to maintain a number of terraced gardens. Mr. White was well known for bringing guests from Sydney on his steam yacht, "Kingfisher." A horse-drawn tram would then transport them to their rooms from the harbour below the house.

On his death, the estate was held in trust for his widow and then passed to their son, Alfred Beecher Stewart White, who lived primarily in Sydney. He used Tahlee House as a country retreat.

=== The Gospel Fishermen ===
In 1948 the staff of the Gospel Fishermen Mission, which was located on the southern shores of Port Stephens in Tanilba Bay, visited Tahlee for a picnic. Over the next year, applications were forwarded to Mr. White to rent the property to the mission. In June 1949, the Theobold family moved into the Waterfront Cottage and began using the ballroom and billiard room at Tahlee. In 1951, the ministry established a missionary training camp under the supervision of Mr. Frank Biggs. Mr White continued to visit Tahlee House but, in 1959, he offered the property to the Mission, which accepted after a large donation made it possible for the purchase to take place.

=== Tahlee Bible College and other activities on the site ===
The first lectures at the new Tahlee Bible College commenced on 10 June 1959 and the public opening held on 31 October 1959 attracted 400 people. More than 1,000 students have trained at the college and many of these are now in Christian service in Australia and in countries all over the world.

Tahlee Bible College officially discontinued operations at Tahlee in 2009 (no students were enrolled in 2008 or 2009). However several other ministries such as camps and events for children, young people, and families continue to be held on site. Present activities also include tours of Tahlee House and other historic buildings.

== Heritage listings ==
Tahlee has the following heritage-listed sites:

- Tahlee Street: Tahlee (pastoral property)

== Notes ==
1. Area calculation is based on 1:100000 maps 9232 NEWCASTLE and 9332 PORT STEPHENS.
