= James Carrington =

James Carrington may refer to:

- James C. Carrington, plant biologist
- James M. Carrington (1904–1995), politician in the Missouri House of Representatives
- Jim Carrington, educationalist and writer of children's literature
- James H. Carrington (1949-2025), actor and screenwriter
