= Tahlee =

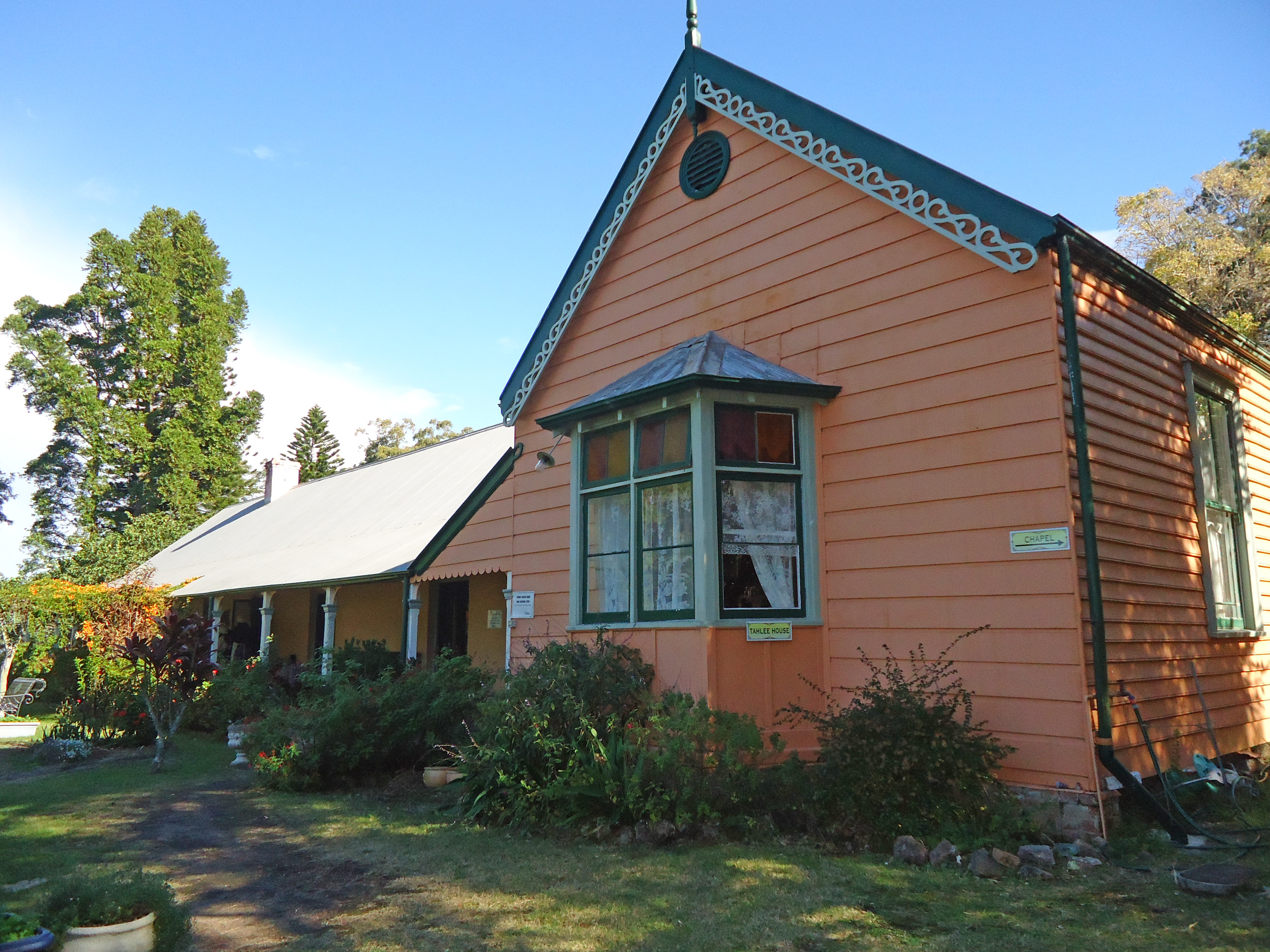
- Tahlee Homestead, 2017

- Location within New South Wales Location within Australia
- 32.6668°S 152.0003°E
- Location: Tahlee Road, Tahlee, Mid-Coast Council, New South Wales, Australia

History
- Built: 1826–1888

Site notes
- Owner: North Arm Cove Properties Pty Ltd; Tahlee Gospel Ministries

New South Wales Heritage Register
- Official name: Tahlee Bible College; Tahlee House; Tahlee Estate; Carrington Archaeological Site; Australian Agricultural Company
- Type: state heritage (landscape)
- Designated: 2 April 1999
- Reference no.: 569
- Type: Historic Landscape
- Category: Landscape – Cultural
- Builders: Australian Agricultural Co., Sir Edward Parry, RHD White

Tahlee is a heritage-listed former pastoral property of 68.8 hectares (170 acres) in the suburb of Tahlee situated on the north side of Port Stephens near Karuah in New South Wales, Australia. It is the original site of the Australian Agricultural Company and more recently the location of the former Tahlee Bible College. It was added to the New South Wales State Heritage Register on 2 April 1999.

== History ==
=== Earliest inhabitants ===
The earliest inhabitants of this area were the Worimi tribe. Tahlee comes from the local Aboriginal word, Tarlee, meaning "sheltered from the wind and above water".

=== European discovery ===
Captain James Cook first sighted Port Stephens on 11 May 1777. He named it after Philip Stephens, then Secretary to the Admiralty. Charles Grimes, Surveyor General of the Colony, explored the area in 1795. It was concluded from his unfavourable report that it would never "be necessary to send a second time to it". This report was later criticised when Newcastle Harbour was established.

=== Australian Agricultural Company ===
In 1824, London was in the midst of an enormous stock market boom. With Australian wool becoming increasingly important, two companies – the Australian Agricultural Company (AACo.) and the Van Diemen's Land Company – were floated on the London Stock Exchange to promote raising fine-wooled sheep in the Australian colonies. The AACo. became a major force in the Australian coal and pastoral industries and in the settlement and development of the Hunter River and Port Stephens regions. Today, listed on the Australian Stock Exchange, it is the oldest Australian company operating under its original name.

Founded by a special Act of Parliament and under Royal Charter, it acquired the right to hold and sell land in New South Wales. Its founding members were a group of British bankers, merchants and politicians who saw the potential for big profits to be made in the colony.

The terms of the charter were that most of the labour would be provided by convicts under the supervision of superintendents, overseers and skilled mechanics sent from England. If, at the end of 15 years, the company had expended 10,000 pounds on improvements and employed 1400 convicts, it would obtain freehold title to its land. The size of the land grant was not specified in the charter, but discussions between the company directors and the Colonial Office settled on one million acres.

The company appointed a chief agent, Robert Dawson and a Colonial Committee to assist him. This eventually included just three people – James Macarthur (fourth son of John Macarthur), his cousin Hannibal Macarthur and his brother-in-law, Principal Surgeon, James Bowman. The committee took a four-year lease of "The Retreat" (later 'Kelvin') at Bringelly near Camden for the immediate accommodation of imported stock, and sought advice on the best location for the land grant.

In June 1825 Dawson sailed from the Isle of Wight with 27 employees and their wives and families, 800 French and Anglo merino sheep, 8 cattle and 6 horses. They were followed a few weeks later by an overseer, 6 shepherds and a further 79 French merinos.

In January 1826, when people and stock were settled, Dawson sailed to Newcastle with a small party on the "Liverpool Packet" and from there, they travelled across country to inspect Port Stephens, an area which, of all those suggested, had the great advantage of access by water.

On the northern shore of Port Stephens, Dawson noticed land which seemed ideal. About 800 acres were suitable for growing corn, while the surrounding hills provided good sheep grazing country, with plenty of fresh water and lime (oyster shells) for building, all situated on a magnificent harbour.

Dawson hurried back to Sydney, determined to take the whole million-acre grant between Port Stephens and the Manning River (named for the AACo.'s deputy governor, William Manning).

Initially known to Europeans by its Aboriginal name, Caribbean, the settlement at Port Stephens was renamed after the banking peer, Lord Carrington, brother of the company's first governor. He was Britain's first Lord Carrington and had strong AACo. links. His grandson was later to become a Governor of New South Wales and Newcastle's Bullock Island was later renamed Carrington in his honour.

One version of the name "Tahlee", a Gringal Aboriginal tribal name, was supposed to mean "sheltered from the wind".

Dawson was much maligned. He gave the Barrington Tops and Barrington River their names. He also clashed with stormy wool pioneer John Macarthur.

Dense bushland with sweeping water views was cleared and settled. In February 1826 Dawson arrived with cattle, sheep and convicts with the express purpose of growing fine wool for the mills of England and to secure a handsome profit for his bosses. The estate's main entry was by sea. It was the first major influx of private investment in Australia. Tahlee House became the original headquarters of the AACo. The house was eventually to become the home of four of the AACo.'s chief agents: Dawson, Parry, Dumaresq and King, whose names were commemorated in Newcastle inner-city street names.

Within four years, by 1830, a new waterfront area of Carrington village, a few hundred metres away from Tahlee, boasted of being the first planned company town in Australia with a population of more than 500 souls and a school for 50 children.

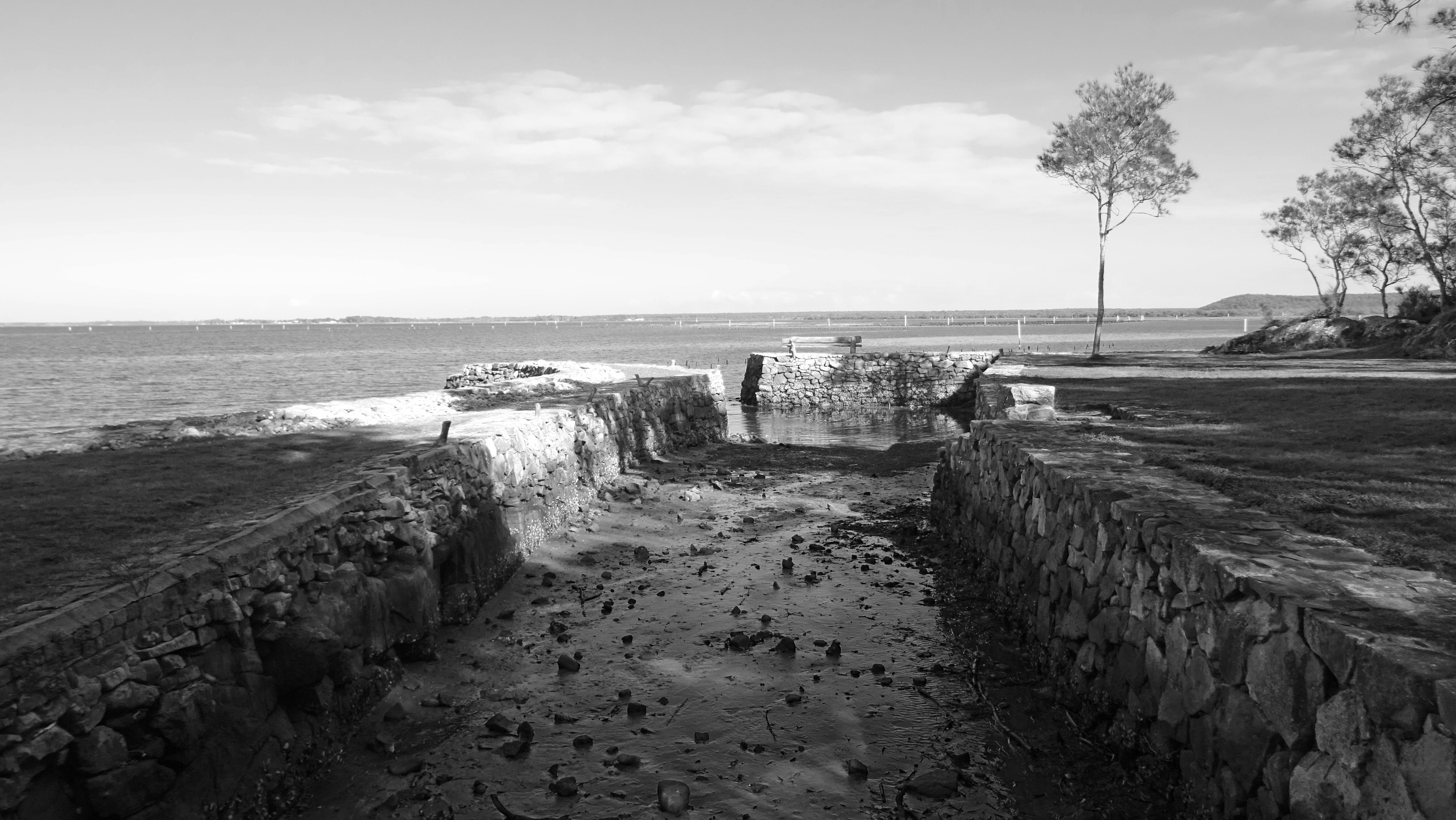
Convict-built boat harbour

The original Carrington village initially had a 26-man military barracks made of brick, a row of 11 substantial cottages, a surgery, a permanent shearing shed, a butcher shop, offices, workshops, a brick kiln, a timber yard, a jail and two wharves.

Over the next two years, Dawson explored the estate, naming many features after the company's directors or places of fine wool production in England. The village at No. 2 Farm took its name, Stroud, from the Gloucestershire town renowned for its manufacture of scarlet cloth; the Barrington River (and Barrington Tops) in honour of Dawson's previous employer, Lord Barrington.

By the end of 1826 a chain of company sheep stations stretched from Carrington in the south to the Gloucester River in the north. Dawson had purchased flocks of colonial ewes and overseen the first shearing, dispatching the wool to England. He had also made arrangements to survey the entire land grant.

Tahlee Estate was occupied by the AACo. in 1826 as their (first) headquarters. It was the first point of European settlement in the district, and there was extensive contact with the local Aboriginal people.

The Commissioner's house was built on the site, and workers housing was built in the nearby village of Carrington. The workers included convict and free workers. The 172-acre estate had few owners and has been left largely intact.

All appeared to be going well but difficulties gradually arose between Dawson and the Colonial Committee which led to Dawson's dismissal in April 1828. John Macarthur took over for a few months before abruptly returning to Sydney, leaving everything in the capable but inexperienced young accountant, Edward Ebsworth.

Meanwhile, in London, the Colonial Office had approached the directors with a proposal that the company should take over the coal mining operations at Newcastle and, after lengthy discussions, the company agreed. John Henderson was appointed colliery manager and arrived in Australia in January 1827 with mechanics, labourers and equipment, 230 sheep and 3 horses. He spent nearly a year prospecting for coal around Newcastle, at Port Stephens and along the Parramatta River, concluding that without the Newcastle coalfield, the company had no mining prospects, but Governor Darling was loath to give it up.

Dawson's dismissal, Henderson's return to England and rumours that the Port Stephens estate in its entirety was unsuitable for their purposes all came as a shock to the directors. As far as the coal venture was concerned, they were prepared to abandon the project provided the Colonial Office paid compensation. After much negotiation, however, it was agreed in June 1828 that the Governor would be instructed to hand over the coalfields, together with a land grant at Newcastle, and that Henderson would return to the colony as colliery manager. By way of compensation the company was granted a 32-year monopoly on coal mining in New South Wales.

Sir William Edward Parry, the Arctic explorer and hydrographer, became the next commissioner of the AA Co in 1829 and arrived at Tahlee in March 1830. Parry set about restoring order at the neglected Port Stephens settlement and assessing the estate there and a possible exchange of land. The next two years were taken up with exploration to the north and west beyond the Dividing Range. In February 1831 Parry visited Governor Darling to negotiate the exchange of the north-eastern part of the Port Stephens estate (north from Bulahdelah) for two blocks of roughly 250,000 acres each – one on the Liverpool Plains (Warrah) and the other on the Peel River (Goonoo Goonoo). His five-year tenure was marked by progress and social reformation. Under his direction, Booral House, Stroud House and Telegherry House were constructed, along with a flour mill at Stroud and a dam on the Karuah River, now known as Washpool. He also personally oversaw the construction of a steamship named "The Karuah."

Parry was a devout Christian. When he discovered that the settlement lacked a church, he conducted his own Sunday service in the carpenter's shop at Carrington. In 1833 he constructed St John's church in Stroud and laid the cornerstone himself. Lady Parry opened a school and provided for the education of nearly 50 children. An adult school was also commissioned for the prisoners who wished to learn how to read and write.

Parry also oversaw the formation of the colliery at Newcastle. Henderson had surveyed and rejected the government mines, so after putting down test boreholes on the hill and Government Reserve to the west of the town, Parry finally chose a site for the first pit that enabled the use of an inclined plane railway to take the coal skips to the company's wharf on the Hunter River. Work at the mine began on 14 January 1832. The promised land grant of 2000 acres was marked out – now covered by Newcastle's suburbs of Cook's Hill and Hamilton.

Sir Edward Parry in May 1832 was plunged into grief due to the death of his beloved and revered mother, which he learned of through Sydney newspapers.

Lady Parry had been a Miss Stanley, a member of the titled Stanley family of Alderley in Cheshire. The residence of the commissioner and his lady on the shores of Port Stephens became a social centre for the district, as well as an administrative centre for the A.A.Company. The house, "Tahlee", still evokes some of the charm, comfort and agreeable atmosphere it must have possessed when inhabited by Parrys. Sir Edward, a deeply religious man, was not only responsible to the London company directors, but also regarded the spiritual and physical well-being of almost 500 people on the company's estate as a solemn and personal responsibility.

Surviving accounts depict Tahlee as a very happy place to live and work during the Parrys' residency. The convivial commissioner and his wife enjoyed their days here with cricket matches, dinners, balls and picnics, despite the limitations imposed by the isolation and smallness of the community. The Christian spirit that flourished at Port Stephens was in contrast to the grim restraint and bitter feelings which prevailed not very far away at Patrick's Plains, at "Castle Forbes", the property of "Major" Mudie. Mr Ebsworth, A.A. Company's accountant, wrote that on a fine summer evening, Lady Parry played the piano, with Sir Edward accompanying her on the violin, or reading aloud in the drawing room.

When Parry left after his four-year term, both pastoral and mining operations were well established. Port Stephens was occupied by a chain of sheep stations and the cattle were settled on the Bowman run west of Gloucester. After a first lambing in 1832 Warrah was temporarily abandoned and the sheep moved to the Peel River where a head station was set up at Calala near the river crossing (now Tamworth). The mine at Newcastle was running smoothly. The only major and continuing difficulty was the battle to obtain sufficient convict labour.

In March 1834 Captain Henry Dumaresq took over from Parry. For the most part the company prospered and in August 1834 the directors were able to announce their first dividend of ten shillings per share.

A track was built over the Dividing Range from Gloucester to Tamworth so that in dry years sheep could be walked from the Peel Estate to Port Stephens for washing and shearing. The head station at the Peel was moved from Calala to Goonoo Goonoo, away from the ever-increasing numbers of often-scabby flocks travelling north to New England and the Darling Downs. By 1849 sheep numbers had reached 85,000.

Warrah was developed for fattening cattle bred at Gloucester and horses were bred as remounts for the Indian army. The company no longer needed to purchase stock – rather its annual sales at Sydney and Maitland were an increasing success. At Newcastle a second pit had been put down and annual coal sales reached a value of 10,500 pounds a year. However, with the end of convict transportation, labour problems became acute, and constant requests were made to London for shepherds and coal miners.

Dumaresq served until his death in 1838, when Mr James Ebsworth took over again as interim commissioner. Mr Ebsworth opposed a proposal by the company's English directors to subdivide the land into small parcels. Port Stephens would be a different place today if the plan had succeeded.

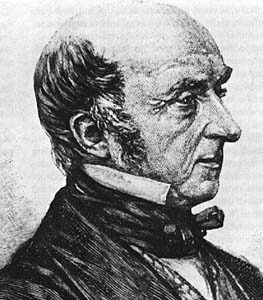
Phillip Parker King

Following Dumaresq's sudden death, directors appointed Captain Phillip Parker King (son of Governor Philip Gidley King) in his place. King came to office just as the depression, triggered in part by the collapse of the London wool market in 1836, began to bite. This was also a time of drought, followed by major floods.

An attempt to introduce 100 young Irish labourers in 1840/1 to relieve the labour shortage ended badly. Only a third actually reached Port Stephens and all refused to shepherd, being unaccustomed to such work and terrified of being lost in the bush.

Other smaller groups of shepherds, labourers and miners sent out from Britain were more successful. The company's agent took to meeting emigrant ships in Sydney and recruited several newly arrived families who settled in Port Stephens. By the end of the 1840s, of the 326 men employed in the company's pastoral operations, none were convicts and only 33 were ticket-of-leave men. By 1849 all 89 miners at the colliery were free men.

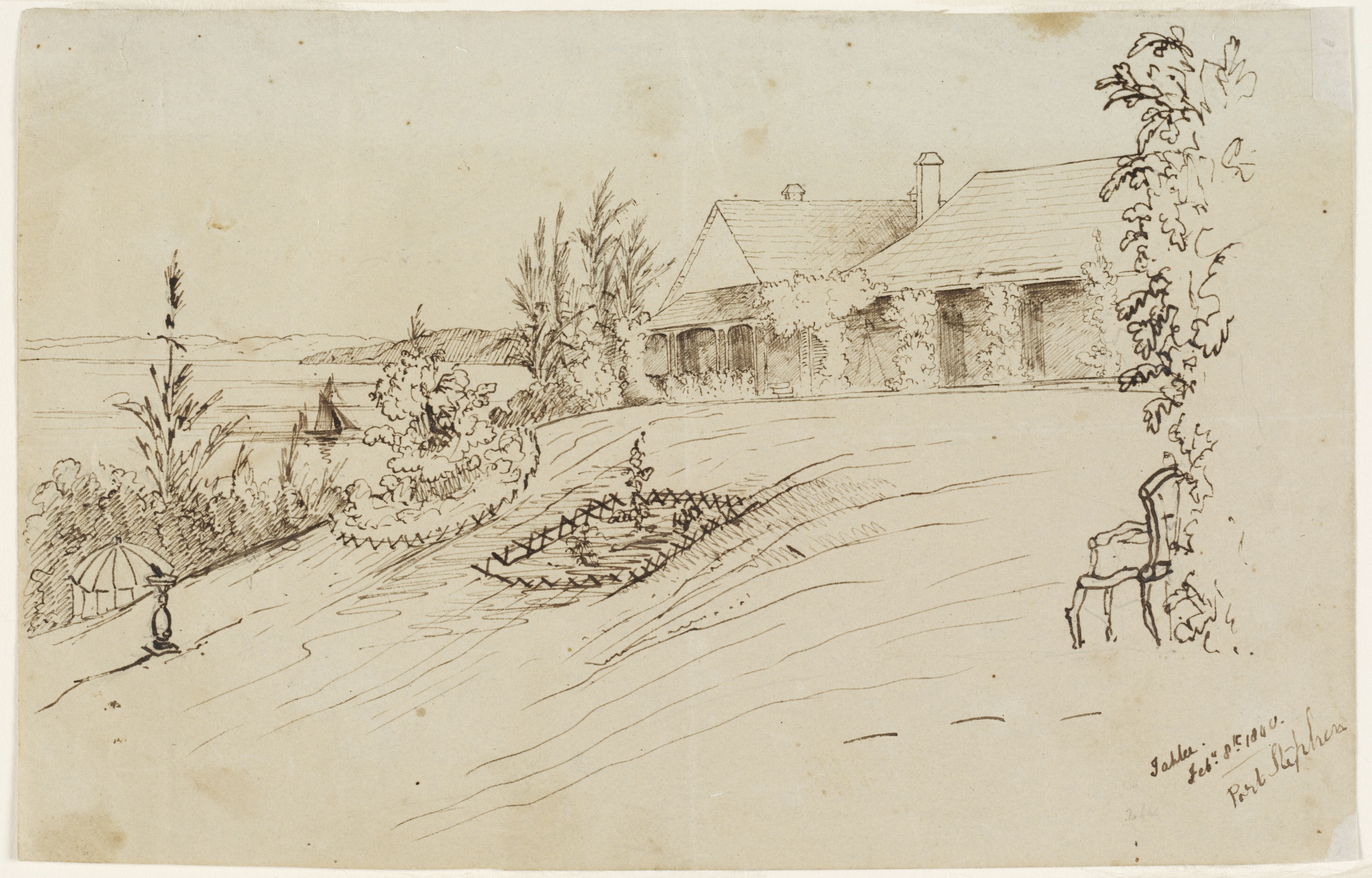
A sketch dated 1840 of the residence at 'Tahlee', overlooking Port Stephens.

During King's term as commissioner, there were constant agitations against the company's coal monopoly. Various prospecting groups proposed coal mines at Westernport in Victoria, the Illawarra in Sydney and at Moreton Bay. Closer to Newcastle were the Ebenezer mine at Lake Macquarie, works near Maitland, at Four Mile near Hexham and a proposal to mine coal at Burwood on the company's southern boundary.

King appealed for support against this opposition, both to the New South Wales Government and to the directors who approached the Colonial Office. At this point the question of the monopoly became entangled with the company's efforts to obtain its title deeds.

At no time had the numbers of convicts actually assigned to the company come anywhere near the numbers envisaged in the charter so that at best, it seemed that the company would be able to redeem only 300,000 of its one million acres.

In London it was decided that, as the convict situation in New South Wales was now so different, an amending Act of Parliament was needed to free the company's pastoral lands from the restriction of the charter. The new Act received Royal assent on 7 August 1846.

There now remained the question of the coal lands at Newcastle. Here it was agreed that, while the company had kept its side of the bargain, raising more than 3000 tons of coal annually, the NSW Government had not, neither supplying convict labour as agreed nor defending the company's position. Consequently, in return for an early end to its coal mining monopoly, the company received its freehold title at Newcastle.

Anticipating a tide of emigration to NSW, the directors planned to sell part of the land. King recommended that the Liverpool Plains Grant should be sold in five sections, followed by the Peel Grant and the Port Stephens Grant, in three sections each. If the large blocks could not be sold, each section should be sold in lots by auction with the reserve price not more than that of the Government – five shillings an acre. Port Stephens, he added, was not generally suited for small-scale agriculture.

This was a shock. The directors had not contemplated a complete sale of their land and stock, and they would be embarrassed to tell shareholders that, after 25 years, they were unlikely to recover their capital. In February 1849 King was called to London to discuss the matter.

Meanwhile, the directors were negotiating with James Ralfe, formerly a government surveyor familiar with the Port Stephens area. Ralfe had recommended a private emigration scheme offering homestead lots for selection. A prospectus for "The Port Stephens Colony" appeared in January 1849: the land would be sold at the fixed price of one pound per acre in lots of not less than 200 (later reduced to 50) acres with reasonable water frontage and the right to depasture stock on company land. The company would charter a ship direct for Port Stephens with free passage for those who paid for their land in London.

On arrival in London, King took a dim view of Ralfe's plan. Only a few isolated spots in Port Stephens were suitable for settlers and their activities would be ruinous for any continuing pastoral operations there. Despite King's objections, the directors were persuaded by Ralfe's enthusiasm, appointing him as agent and surveyor to go out with the settlers on the chartered "Artemesia". As it turned out, only 8 colonists signed up and embarked with their families and just 24 selection certificates were issued.

Local auction sales of lots were more successful and half-acre town lots and a few farms were sold in south Tamworth, at Carrington and around Stroud. In these drastically changed circumstances, the directors decided to replace the commissioner with a less well-paid general superintendent, combine management positions and halve the number of overseers.

Then in March 1852, Thomas Renwick and Thomas Laurie, sons of long-time company employees, and both just returned from the Californian gold fields, found gold on the banks of the Peel River. In London the company's share price soared from 15 pounds to 350 pounds in a few weeks before dropping back to 280. Unable to work gold under their charter, the directors formed the Peel River Land & Mineral Company to purchase and work the Peel Estate (Goonoo Goonoo).

The Peel Company, with King as general superintendent, would raise sheep and some cattle, and lease its goldfield to the Cordillera Mining Company, which would dispatch miners and machinery from England.

The venture was a disaster. The "Tory" carrying the expedition was wrecked at Anna Bay, south of Port Stephens. All but one of the people were saved, but the machinery was lost. Other attempts to work minerals were equally unsuccessful.

The AACo. retained Port Stephens, Warrah and the coalmines at Newcastle. Although the fine wool produced at Port Stephens brought excellent prices on the London market, all was not well with the sheep. At Port Stephens mortality figures rose and lambing percentages fell, while sheep from the same flocks thrived on the Peel Estate.

The Port Stephens district finally proved too wet underfoot for the early sheep flocks, and the AACo. acquired better land in the Peel Valley in 1854. Captain Phillip Parker King was the final AA Co commissioner to live in Tahlee House. The AACo. headquarters was moved to Stroud in 1853 and the Estate was sold to a Sydney stockbroker and investor, Robert Hoddley Driberg White (RHD White).

In 1854 the directors decided to sell all the Port Stephens sheep, and by 1856 they were gone. Cattle breeding continued at Port Stephens and land sales were promoted around Stroud.

=== After the Australian Agricultural Company ===
Frederick Manton, from Sydney, purchased the Tahlee property from the AA Co in 1854 for £2,500. His family used the property for grazing. However, the house burned down in 1860, leaving only the walls.

=== The White era ===
In 1880 the property was purchased by Robert Hoddle Driberg White, Member of Parliament for Gloucester (from 1882) and substantially developed as a gentleman's country residence. The present Tahlee House, dating from 1880, may be the fourth house on the site. The estate only revitalised from 1880 when R. H. D. White set about expanding his landholdings and creating a new gentleman's residence on Tahlee's old home ruins.

White's father, James White, had been the AACo.'s stock master at Port Stephens. The colourful R. H. D. White, owner of two private steam yachts, became the member for Gloucester and rebuilt Tahlee House to hold lavish parties.

Considerable development took place during this period. Improvements and extensions were added to Tahlee House. A billiard room and ballroom were constructed with marble for some of the fireplaces in these buildings imported from Italy. Twelve full-time gardeners were employed to maintain a number of terraced gardens.

Guests arrived by yacht, landing below the home at a convict-built Cornish boat harbour. They were then taken by horse-drawn tram up the hillside through magnificent botanical gardens. There were summer houses and bird aviaries with 12 gardeners to look after the terraced gardens, luxuriant with towering New Zealand kauri trees (Agathis australis), Japanese elms (Zelkova serrata), hoop pines (Araucaria cunninghamii), African olives (Olea europaea var.africana) and bamboo thickets.

White added a large lounge room to entertain the Sydney social set, plus in about 1890 built a separate billiard room (now a chapel) and ballroom capable of seating about 300 people. What is seen today is largely the legacy of White's ownership while the boat harbour, wine cellar and servants' quarters to the rear of the main house recall the AACo. tenure.

On his death, the estate was held in trust for his widow and then passed to their son, Alfrey Beecher Stewart White, who lived primarily in Sydney. He used Tahlee House as a country retreat.

=== The Gospel Fishermen ===
In 1943 a group calling itself the Gospel Fishermen Mission moved across the Port Stephens waterway from Tanilba Bay to lease the Tahlee site.

The Director, Godfrey Theobald, had developed a three pronged approach to mission.

- Evangelists travelling in 'Gospel Vans' visited isolated districts.
- Large meetings were held in churches in Newcastle and the Hunter Region.
- Children's camps were held at Tanilba for the purpose of evangelism.

In 1948, the staff of Gospel Fishermen visited Tahlee for a picnic. Over the next year, applications were forwarded to Mr White to rent the property to the mission. In 1949 the property was leased to the Gospel Fishermen Mission as a camp centre.

In June 1949, the Theobold family moved into the Waterfront Cottage and began using the ballroom and billiard room at Tahlee. In 1951, the ministry established a missionary training camp under the supervision of Mr Frank Biggs.

Mr White continued to visit Tahlee House. In 1959, he offered the property to the Mission, who accepted after a large donation made it possible for the purchase to take place.

=== Tahlee Bible College ===
Rev Eric Potter, a Methodist minister, was the first Principal of Tahlee Bible College and Godfrey Theobald held the position of the first College President. Lectures commenced on 10 June 1959, while the public opening held on 31 October 1959 attracted 400 people. More than 1,000 students have trained at the college and many of these are now in Christian service in Australia and in countries all over the world. Extensive renovations have been carried out on the property. Management has concentrated on running camps and events for children, young people and families. Tours of the historic buildings are regularly held.

During the early years of the college (especially 1962 and 1963), the huts which had housed soldiers located at Greta Army Camp were moved by road to the Tahlee property. A number of these buildings became dormitories for students, both from Australia and overseas. In 1963, this included the larger picture theatre, which was taken down on site ( each section having been identified ) and transported to the college site. This was later reconstructed on a reasonably level site on the northern side of the original ballroom.

It was also during this period that the students benefited from being taught basic skills in DIY tasks that anticipated their future missionary role on location throughout the world, especially in more remote places. A sawmill was established to the north of the cleared ground surrounding College buildings, bushcraft skills being taught as well as some horticultural guidance. A large dam was constructed to provide additional water storage for ongoing requirements.

In 19several structures were relocated from the Greta and Singleton migrant camps to the site for use as residential accommodation.

Now known as Tahlee Ministries Inc., visiting is possible by prior arrangement. The estate ceased operating as a bible college c. 2005, but remains in use by Tahlee Ministries for religious purposes.

== Description ==
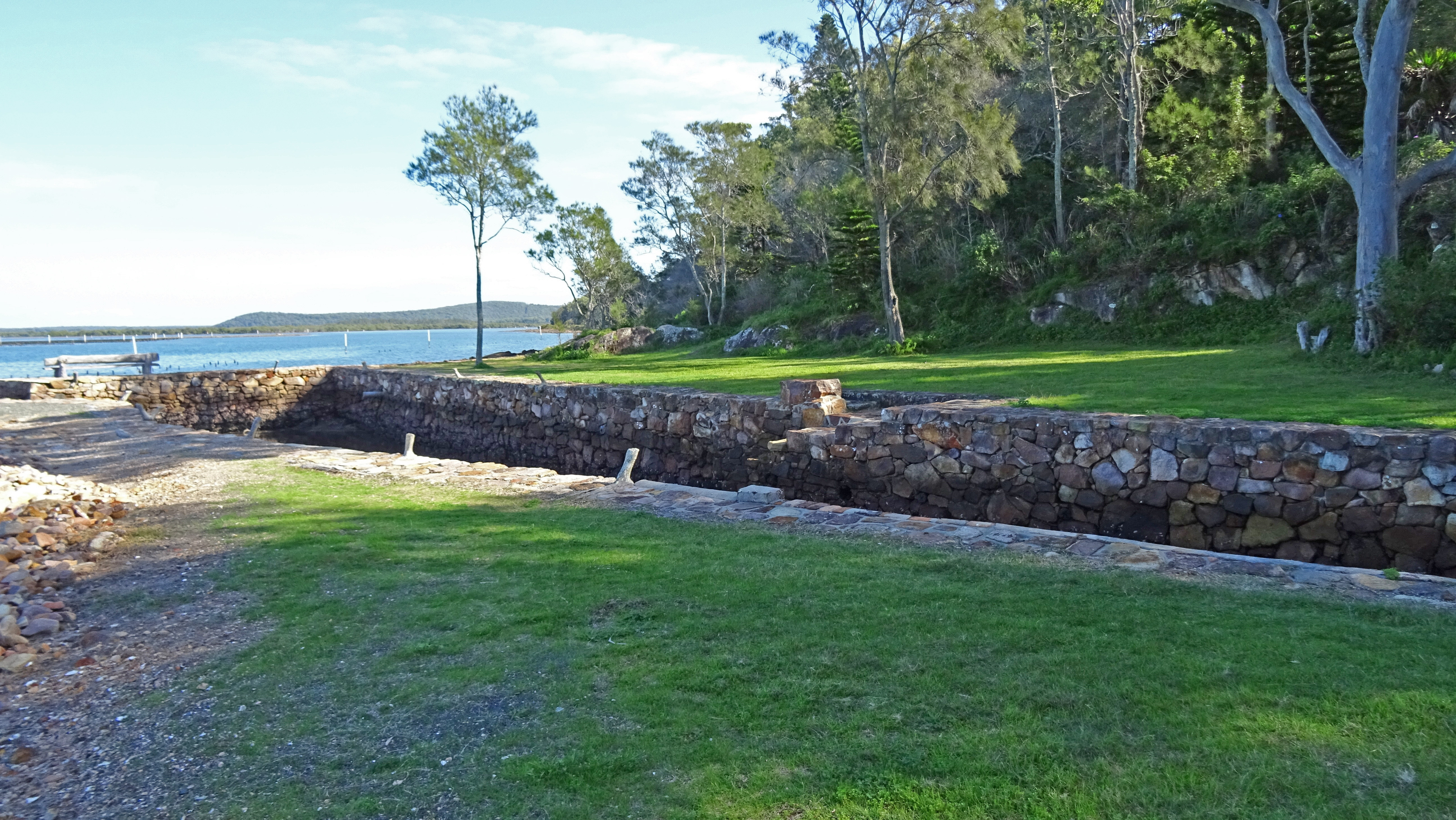
Tahlee Boat Harbour

Tahlee is a 44-hectare (108 acres) rural estate containing the former headquarters of the Australian Agricultural Company 1826–1853.

Significant features include:

- Tahlee House and outbuildings 1828–1888 (stone and timber, iron roof, stone cellar),
- Boat Harbour 1828 (stone)
- gardens 1830–1890,
- caretakers cottage 1890 (timber)
- Reception & Ballroom building 1888–90 (timber),
- Residential Bible College 1959–99 (timber, brick )
- relocated Nissen Huts and Cinema from Greta Migrant Camp (timber and iron, relocated 1964)

The physical condition of the estate was reported to vary between good and poor as at 24 December 1999, with high archaeological potential.

== Heritage listing ==
Tahlee Estate is of very high local, regional, state and national significance, contributing to our understanding of the history and development of Australia in every aspect of cultural significance including pre-European and European settlement. Evidence of past use of the Estate and the reasons for its significance remain sufficiently intact for the interpretation of the heritage of the Estate.

Tahlee was listed on the New South Wales State Heritage Register on 2 April 1999 having satisfied the following criteria.

The place is important in demonstrating the course, or pattern, of cultural or natural history in New South Wales.

Settlement site of the Australian Agricultural Company, a key export company in the early economy of NSW. Settlement of areas of Gloucester and Manning districts and Peel River was initiated from this site by its occupants Robert Dawson, Sir Edward Parry and Colonel Dumaresq. It is a significant area of pre-European human occupation. This is the site of an early positive encounter and treaty with local Aboriginal peoples. Documentation by occupants of the site including Robert Dawson and James Ebsworth of the Gringai people contributes to an understanding of a racial group that formerly inhabited the area. The Estate has association with a number of prominent people who have contributed to Australian and NSW history including John Macarthur, Sir Edward Parry, Colonel Dumaresq, Phillip King, RHD White. The Estate itself contributed to their role in history and reflects their past presence.

The place is important in demonstrating aesthetic characteristics and/or a high degree of creative or technical achievement in New South Wales.

The aesthetic tastes of the occupants of the site are reflected in the orientation of the house and the gardens toward the views and the period design styles reflected in the buildings and gardens. Enjoyment of the site is reflected in the remains of recreational pursuits of boating, terraced gardens and bathing. The Estate has been the subject of a number of prominent artists and others including Augustus Earle and Conrad Martens.

The place has strong or special association with a particular community or cultural group in New South Wales for social, cultural or spiritual reasons.

The Estate is valued by the State, regional and local community as the site of settlement of the AA Co. and the residence of a prominent local figure and politician RHD White. The Estate is also valued by the Protestant Christian communities of NSW, and the Newcastle region in its association with a number of Protestant figures in NSW history including Sir Edward and Lady Parry, Reverend Cowper, the King family, and the Gospel Fishermen Mission. This value is reflected in the continued use of the property as a Bible College.

The place has potential to yield information that will contribute to an understanding of the cultural or natural history of New South Wales.

This is a significant site of European settlement from 1826 with sufficient ruins and documentation remaining to enable the pattern of settlement to be determined. The marine focus of the site including the boat harbour and observatory reflects a way of life which depended upon sea transport. Evidence of continued use of the site for 164 years enables former ways of life, the stages of settlement, early and late Victorian use of the site to be understood. The Observatory reflects the exploratory and scientific interests of Phillip King as well as reflecting the level of boating activity in the port in the 19th century. A high level of horticultural interest and technical excellence is reflected in the terraced gardens. The grazing land of Lot 340 reflects the former use of the shoreland of Port Stephens for extensive gazing, a use no longer prominent.

The place possesses uncommon, rare or endangered aspects of the cultural or natural history of New South Wales.

The site is a rare intact record of 164 years of European development – the gardens are very rare for their intactness and composition.

The place is important in demonstrating the principal characteristics of a class of cultural or natural places/environments in New South Wales.

The Estate is representative of the work of the A.A.Co. in NSW
