= Carrington =

Carrington may refer to:

- Carrington (name), an English surname and given name

== Places ==
=== In Australia ===
- Carrington, Queensland, Australia, a locality near Atherton
- Carrington, New South Wales, Australia, a suburb of Newcastle
- Carrington, New South Wales (Mid-Coast Council), Australia, a locality
- Carrington Falls, New South Wales, a waterfall
- Carrington Street, a street in Adelaide

=== In Barbados ===
- Carrington, Saint Philip, Barbados, a village

=== In Great Britain ===
- Carrington, Greater Manchester, a village and civil parish
- Carrington Moss, a large area of peat bog near Carrington, Greater Manchester
- Carrington, Lincolnshire, a village and civil parish
- Carrington, Midlothian, a village
- Carrington, Nottingham, Nottinghamshire, a small suburb of Nottingham

=== In the United States ===
- Carrington, Missouri, an unincorporated community
- Carrington, North Dakota, a city

=== On the Moon ===
- Carrington (crater), a lunar crater

== Schools ==
- Carrington College, Otago (opened 1945), Residential College at the University of Otago in New Zealand
- Carrington College (US), a network of for-profit private colleges in the western United States
- Carrington High School, North Dakota, United States
- Carrington Middle School, Durham County, North Carolina, United States
- Carrington School, a secondary school in Redhill, Surrey, England

== Arts and entertainment ==
- Dora Carrington (1893–1932), British artist typically known simply as "Carrington"
- Carrington (film) (1995), British biographical film about Dora Carrington
- Carrington V.C. (play) (1953), British legal drama
- Carrington V.C. (film) (1955)

== Other ==
- Baron Carrington, three titles, one each in the Peerage of England, Ireland and Great Britain
- Viscount Carrington, a title in the Peerage of Ireland
- Carrington, Trafford Training Centre, training ground of Manchester United F.C.
- Carrington railway station, former railway station in Carrington, Nottingham

== See also ==
- Carrington Event, or Solar storm of 1859, named for astronomer Richard Christopher Carrington
