= Robert White (Australian politician) =

Australian lawyer and politician

Robert H. D. White
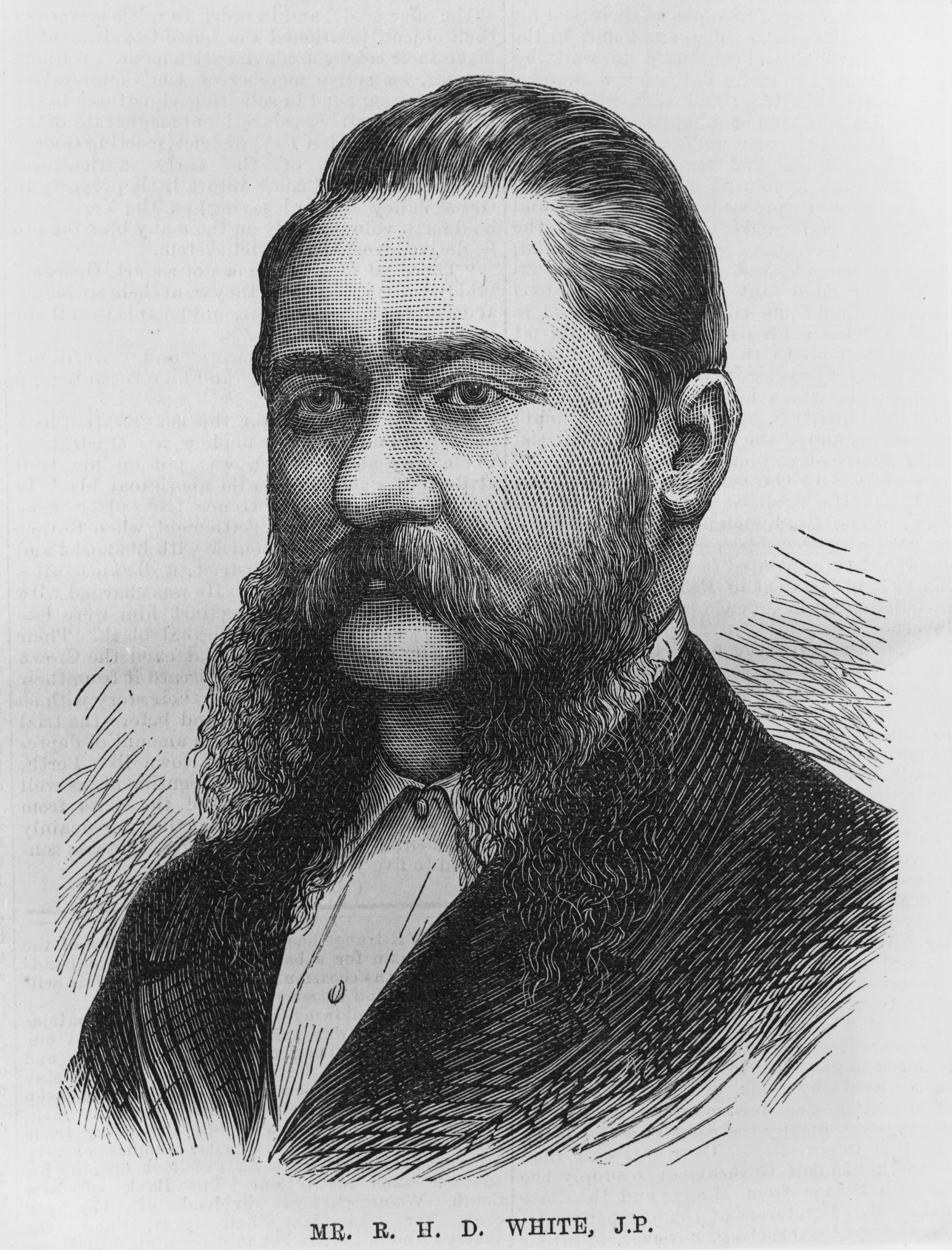

Member for Gloucester (New South Wales Legislative Assembly)
- In office 21 December 1882 – 26 January 1887

Member of the New South Wales Legislative Council
- In office 8 February 1888 – 28 October 1900

Personal details
- Born: 19 May 1838 Stroud, New South Wales
- Died: 28 October 1900 (aged 62) Callan Park, Lilyfield, New South Wales

Robert Hoddle Driberg White (19 May 1838 – 20 October 1900) was an Australian politician. He was the member for the New South Wales electorate of Gloucester from December 1882 to January 1887 and a member of the Legislative Council from December 1887 until his death in 1900. White was known for his extravagant lifestyle and lavish hospitality at his 'Tahlee' estate at Port Stephens.

In his early working career White was an officer in the Bank of New South Wales, managing branches at Rockhampton and Mudgee. In 1880 he initiated a lawsuit against his elderly grandfather, Robert Hoddle, who had been the surveyor-general of the Port Phillip District during the formative years of the later colony of Victoria. Under a settlement between the parties, White inherited a half-share in valuable property in Melbourne, together with accumulated rents. With his newly acquired wealth White purchased property, including the 'Tahlee' estate, and travelled with his wife to Europe. In December 1882 he was elected member for the Gloucester electorate in the New South Wales Legislative Assembly. White retired from parliament in January 1887, but in December that year he accepted an appointment to the Upper House. In 1898 White was committed to the Callan Park Asylum, where he died in October 1900.

== Biography ==
=== Early life ===
Robert Hoddle Driberg White was born on 19 May 1838 at Stroud, the eldest son of James Charles White and his first wife, Sarah Elizabeth (née Hoddle).

Robert's parents had married in May 1837 in Sydney. His father arrived in Australia in 1830 as private secretary to Sir Edward Parry, the Chief Commissioner of the Australian Agricultural Company. White was appointed to the position of Superintendent of Agriculture, based at the A. A. Company's headquarters at Port Stephens and nearby Stroud, from where he had charge of the large number of convicts assigned to the service of the company. Robert's mother was the only child of Robert Hoddle, a surveyor employed by the colonial government of New South Wales. In 1837, a year before the birth of his grandson, Hoddle took charge of the survey work for the urban layout of Melbourne, which had been declared as the administrative capital of the Port Phillip District.

Robert's mother died in October 1841, ten days after giving birth to her third child (who died in 1842). After their mother's death Robert and his younger brother James lived with their father. Robert's father remarried in August 1848, to Ann MacAnsh, in Sydney. After their father remarried, Robert and James White lived in Melbourne for several years with their maternal grandparents, Robert and Mary Hoddle. In 1850 Robert was sent to school in Sydney, where he remained until 1853. He occasionally visited his grandparents during that period.

White was first employed at Bowral as a private clerk to Captain Brownrigg, general manager of the A. A. Company. He also worked in the office of Thomas Mort for a short period.

=== Banking career ===
In 1857 White was employed in Sydney as a junior clerk in the Bank of New South Wales, on a salary of £120 a year. By 1859 he was working as an accountant in the Deniliquin branch of the bank, in the southern Riverina of New South Wales. At that time the building occupied by the branch was situated in an isolated part of the township, apart from other dwellings.

During the evening of Saturday, 15 October 1859, the bank at Deniliquin was stuck up by three armed men with blackened and obscured faces. White and George Miller, the manager of the bank, were accosted and had their hands bound with ropes. The bushrangers departed with gold and notes to the value of £7,850. After a female servant released the men, the police were alerted and, as news of the robbery spread through the community, a large number of townspeople assembled at the scene. A search was commenced that night by the light of torches and on the following day. A portion of the stolen banknotes was found strewn on the ground between the bank and a nearby lagoon. A discarded mask and clothing, as well as banknotes packed into coffee-tins, were found at a tent pitched near the lagoon. On 24 October the police brought four prisoners before Miller and White for identification. The bank officers identified two of the men, William Drew and William Lee, based on their voices and tattoos on the backs of Drew's hands. The police also suspected Edward Geaghan of being involved in the bank robbery; he was a sawyer, and a married man with children, living in a tent in the district, but searches had not revealed any trace of the remainder of the stolen money. On 5 November police and the bank officers were searching in the vicinity of Geaghan's tent when they discovered £712 from the robbery, wrapped in a parcel and stashed underneath the carcass of a dead bullock. This induced Geaghan to turn police informant and implicate Drew and Lee, as well as a third man named John Vaughan. The three accused men were tried at the Goulburn Circuit Court on 27 March 1860 and found guilty. On the following day the judge sentenced Drew and Lee to ten years' hard labour (the first two years to be served in irons) and Vaughan to eight years' hard labour.^{[A]}

In May 1860 an agency of the Bank of New South Wales was opened at Toowoomba, in the Darling Downs district of Queensland, with Robert H. D. White as the agent in charge. In June 1860 the Bank of New South Wales opened a branch at Toowoomba, with White as manager. White was appointed as a magistrate of the colony of Queensland in 1861.

White's maternal grandmother, Mary Hoddle, died in October 1862. She had been afflicted with cancer since 1852. In July 1863 White's grandfather married a young woman named Frances ('Fanny') Baxter.

Robert H. D. White married Eliza Jane Cowper on 2 May 1863 at St. Philip's Church in Sydney. Eliza was a niece of the New South Wales politician, Charles Cowper. The couple had six children, born between 1865 and 1879.

White remained manager of the Toowoomba branch until May 1864, when he was transferred to Rockhampton.

=== Rockhampton ===
In May 1864 White was appointed as manager of the Rockhampton branch of the Bank of New South Wales. From September 1864 White held the honorary position of captain of the Rockhampton Volunteers, a company of the Queensland Volunteer Rifle Brigade. He also held the position of Guardian of Minors at Rockhampton, as well as leading positions in several "local institutions and charities" in the township.

From late March 1868 White spent several weeks at the Mary River goldfields, 45 miles (72 km) south of Maryborough, establishing and opening a branch of the New South Wales Bank there. The township that developed on the Gympie Creek diggings had been initially named Nashville (later changed to Gympie).

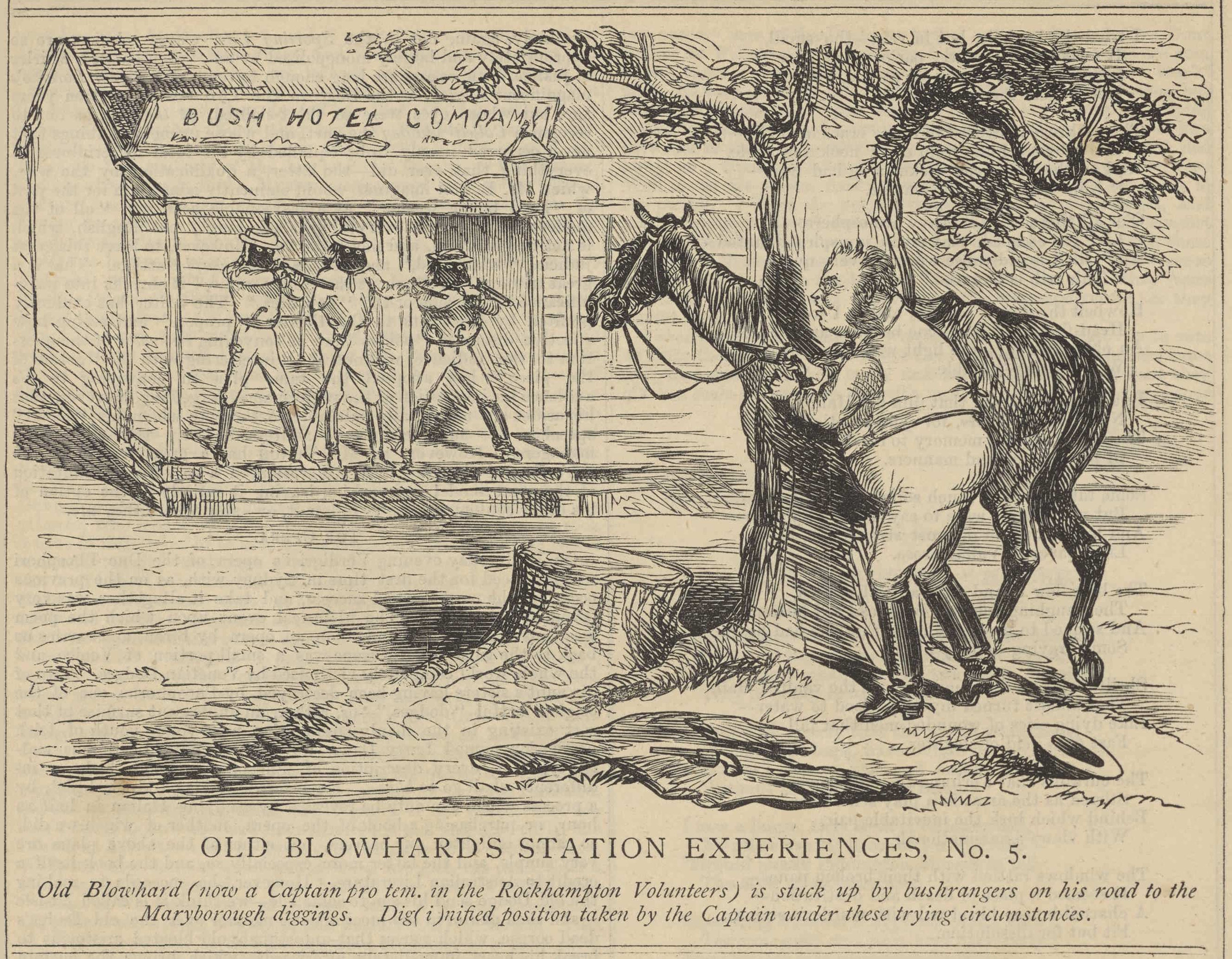
'Old Blowhard's Station Experiences, No. 5', published in Sydney Punch, 30 May 1868, a cartoon satirising White's encounter with bushrangers at the Currie Hotel near the Gympie Creek goldfields.

On Sunday evening, 19 April, White arrived at Booker's Currie Hotel, on the road between Nashville and Maryborough, in company with Charles Buckland, manager of the new bank branch at Nashville. White was on the first leg of his return to Rockhampton. The two men had just arrived at the hotel and were seated on a sofa "taking a glass of wine together", when they were confronted by a masked man holding a revolver, who ordered them to 'bail up'. However, White was armed, with a "large Tranter revolver" and a Smith and Wesson six-shooter on his belt; he drew his Tranter firearm, jumped at the assailant and caught him by the wrist. White pointed the revolver at the man's stomach and pulled on the trigger three times, but the safety-guard was on and the gun did not fire. White wrestled the man out of the door and "commenced battering his head with the barrel". The bushranger screamed for help and "two of his mates came to his rescue", each holding a revolver to the bank manager's head. White dropped the Tranter at their feet and said, "there are my arms – take them". This prompted the bushrangers to hold down their revolvers, at which White immediately drew his second firearm and fired at the first man, who was standing within four feet of him. The bushranger fell down, before regaining his feet. Another of the bushrangers fired a double-barrelled gun at White from a distance of six yards, but it missed. White returned fire without effect and then ran into the surrounding bush, where he remained all night.

After this altercation the bushrangers "made vigilant search of the inmates and premises" but only managed to obtain about £15 in cash from those at the hotel. When they left they also took "a bottle of brandy and a large plum pudding". The bushranger had been all masked. It was conjectured that "they were acquainted with Mr. White's movements" and had bailed up the hotel "under the impression that he was carrying a large amount of money or gold with him". The local police later discovered the bushranger's camp-site, where they found a blood-stained shirt and a saddle, left behind after they had departed. On 2 May the man wounded by White, identified as John Devine (alias Parker), was captured in the Royal Hotel at Tenterfield while he was having a wound in his arm dressed by a doctor.

On 30 May 1868 the Sydney Punch published a cartoon captioned 'Old Blowhard's Station Experiences, No. 5' which was based on the reports of White's encounter with bushrangers near the Gympie Creek diggings. The cartoon, one of a series of 'Old Blowhard' parodies in the Sydney Punch, depicted three masked men standing on the verandah of a roadside hotel, pointing their pistols at a cowering rotund man, hiding behind a tree and his horse. Subsequent commentary published in the Maryborough Chronicle was critical of the cartoon, describing it as "a vile woodcut, intended to cast ridicule on Mr. White". The writer further stated that the drawing was "in the worst possible taste" and "about as stupid and wicked a thing as could be perpetrated". In June 1868 the Queensland Government presented White with a "double-barrelled needle-gun with ammunition and necessary implements" in acknowledgement of his "uncommon gallantry under circumstances of imminent personal peril" during the attack by armed bushrangers at the Currie Hotel. White also received, from the board of directors of the Bank of New South Wales, a set of silver spoons and forks, each engraved with his initials, enclosed in a mahogany chest bearing an inscription commemorating the event.

White was a resident of Rockhampton when the Assistant Gold Commissioner, Thomas Griffin, murdered two constables under his command in November 1867, during the transfer of cash from Rockhampton to Clermont. Griffin was convicted of the murders and sentenced to hang. The execution was carried out on 1 June 1868 at Rockhampton. Six days after the murderer was buried, it was discovered that his grave had been disturbed and an investigation revealed that Griffin's remains had been decapitated and his head stolen. The identities of those who carried out the removal of Griffin's head was not publicly revealed until many years after the event (in most cases, after the perpetrators' deaths). Four men were named: Dr. William Callaghan (a local medical practitioner), William Holland (a hospital wardsman), W. H. Leighton Bailey (editor of Rockhampton's Northern Argus) and Robert H. D. White (local bank manager).

In June 1868 White, as commanding officer of the Rockhampton Volunteers, sent a report to his superiors in the Volunteer Rifle Brigade office in Brisbane, claiming that the local volunteer corps "was in a state of insubordination". A newly appointed officer, Lieutenant Fraser, had previously called a public meeting at the Albion Hotel, where he and other volunteers expressed their opposition to White's command. Dissatisfaction within the ranks reached such a level that White was asked to resign and Dr. Archibald Robertson, assistant-surgeon in the company, challenged the captain to a duel. In August 1868 White commanded the company to assemble at the Rockhampton court-house, where he read out a letter he had received from Brisbane, approving the disbandment of the Rockhampton company of the Queensland Volunteer Rifle Brigade. White then ordered the delivering up of arms and uniforms and threatened, "those failing to do so summonses will be issued against them", before dismissing the men. Lieutenant Thomas asked White for the reason he had taken this course of action, to which he replied: "I cannot answer you, sir, I am now a private individual". As White left his position in front of the company, "three groans were called for and given". Two members of the company of twenty-two called for three cheers, "but the attempt was drowned in groans by the remainder". "A scene of wordy excitement" then ensued; some of the men stated "that the affair was a piece of spite on the part of the captain" and several "in indignant and violent terms, expressed their opinion of the commanding officer and the insult they considered he had been instrumental in offering them". In the evening of the following day "members of the late volunteer corps" held a meeting in the Albion Hotel where they resolved to draft a requisition to be sent to Brisbane, "for the purpose of forming a new Volunteer Company in Rockhampton".

In October 1868 approval was received from the Volunteer Brigade office in Brisbane for the formation of a new Volunteer Company at Rockhampton, under the command of Captain Charles Dick, a local solicitor. However, a request for Dr. Robertson to be appointed assistant-surgeon in the new company was denied, for the reason that his previous position under White's command would "tend to produce a feeling of irritation on his re-appointment, which could not fail to be prejudicial to the interests of the Company". In early December 1868 it was reported that White had "obtained leave to withdraw his report", as a result of which the Brisbane Brigade office would accept Dr. Robertson's appointment as assistant-surgeon in the Rockhampton Volunteers. In November 1868 satirical verse entitled 'Battle of the Captains' was published in the Rockhampton Bulletin, with Captain White, mockingly described as "Sir Robert, hight of Driberg!".

The climate at Rockhampton proved to be detrimental to Eliza White's health, "being too warm for her constitution, which was injuriously affected thereby". In 1869 White requested the bank directors to transfer his services "to a colder and more genial locality". In March 1869 White was transferred to Mudgee in the central west of New South Wales.

=== Mudgee ===
White was appointed manager of the Mudgee branch of the Bank of New South Wales. White and his wife and family were residents of Mudgee from 1869 until February 1881. During his period at Mudgee, White invested in district gold and diamond mining ventures. Soon after his transfer to Mudgee, White began to accumulate debts as a result of the mining speculations. In 1869 he quarrelled with his grandfather, Robert Hoddle, after asking him for assistance.

The first Assize Court at Mudgee was held in April 1873. White had been appointed a Justice of the Peace in New South Wales and regularly sat on the local Bench of Magistrates.

Although he was based at Mudgee, White occasionally oversaw the establishment of new branches of the Bank of New South Wales or acted as relieving manager. In 1875 the manager of the Beechworth branch of the Bank of New South Wales was charged with fraud on the eve of his transfer to Kyneton, in central Victoria. White travelled to Kyneton as a bank inspector and relieving manager of the branch. While he was there White travelled to nearby Melbourne and asked his grandfather, Robert Hoddle, for financial assistance, which resulted in a quarrel between the two. As a result of the quarrel and subsequent inquiries, White discovered the existence of a deed of trust, executed in 1852, of certain land in Elizabeth Street in Melbourne in favour his late grandmother and her grandchildren (of whom he was the only surviving one). The trust deed became the subject of litigation initiated by White in 1880. White raised funds by mortgaging his land and other means in order to carry on the lawsuit, demonstrating "his determination to make an active contention for his rights".

In 1877 White took charge of a new branch of the Bank of New South Wales that opened in Coonamble.

=== White v. Hoddle ===
In 1880 Robert White initiated a lawsuit in the Victorian Court of Equity against his grandfather, Robert Hoddle (then aged 86), and his second wife Frances. White claimed that in about October 1852 his grandfather had executed a declaration of trust, pertaining to several allotments in the Melbourne city-centre, upon his first wife Mary (White's grandmother) during her lifetime. The conveyance of the property by Hoddle and his first wife had taken place in 1843. The property in question were allotments 10 and 11 of section 13 in Elizabeth Street, consisting of buildings on the west side of Elizabeth Street, extending from Little Collins Street to Bourke Street. In 1880 the value of the whole was estimated to be about three hundred thousand pounds. Mary Hoddle had died in 1862. The basis of White's lawsuit was that, upon the death of Mary Hoddle, the deed had stipulated White and his younger brother (who died in 1867) were to receive title to the said allotments. The equity case was sent for trial so a jury could settle the issue, with the case to be heard in the Supreme Court of Victoria.

The trial commenced on Monday, 2 August 1880, before the Chief Justice, William Stawell. White's difficulty was the loss of documentary evidence. The conveyance could not be found and the solicitor who had failed to register it had been committed to a lunatic asylum in Queensland. However, in evidence given at the trial, four "reputable residents of Melbourne" testified to the existence of the deed. At the start of proceedings on 7 August, the sixth day of the trial, the counsel for Robert Hoddle announced to the judge that, after a conference between the parties, "a satisfactory arrangement had been arrived at". The Chief Justice then discharged the jury. Under the terms of the settlement the plaintiff, Robert White, was to obtain a one-half share in the Elizabeth Street property (valued at about £150,000), together with £48,500 in cash, representing a portion of accumulated rents on the property.

White and his wife left for England aboard the P. and O. Company's steamer R.M.S. Peshawur on 24 February 1881. The couple's children were left in the care of White's sister-in-law at Mudgee.

During his overseas travels White made a number of valuable purchases, some of which was lost before it was landed in Australia. In March 1882 it was reported that, due to the "loss of a steamship in the British Channel", White had lost "£3000 worth of superb furniture, selected from the best foreign marts and exhibitions". On 14 February 1882 the iron barque Romeo ran aground near Gabo Island on a voyage from Hamburg to Sydney, resulting in the loss of the vessel and its cargo (which included "valuable pianos" that had been purchased by White). In Europe White also purchased an organ for St. John's church in Mudgee, at a cost of a thousand pounds, which arrived safely in Australia. He presented the organ and "a magnificent bell" to the church in April 1882. In July 1882 members of the choir of St. John's church presented White "with an appreciative address on the eve of his departure from Mudgee", The address "extolled his efficiency as choir-master, and thanked him for his gift of the magnificant organ".

=== The member for Gloucester ===
In November 1882, after the decisive defeat of the Government's Land Bill in the New South Wales Legislative Assembly, the Colonial Secretary, Sir Henry Parkes, dissolved parliament and issued writs for the election of a new Assembly. White had previously determined to run for political office and was travelling in Tasmania and Melbourne when news of the dissolution of parliament reached him. White's Sydney residence was 'Milton House' in Blackwood Avenue, Ashfield, but had decided to contest the electorate of Gloucester for the stated reasons that he was born at Stroud and possessed "considerable property at Port Stephens". The nominations for the seat of Gloucester were held at a public meeting at Stroud on 15 December 1882 when four candidates, including White, were proposed. The nominees addressed those present "at considerable length upon the leading questions of the day". The speakers "were all considerably interrupted, but fair order prevailed". During White's speech he was taunted with being unknown to most voters in the electorate. A show of hands favoured White, but another of the candidates, Henry Hudson, demanded a poll be conducted.

Polling day for the Gloucester electorate was 21 December, resulting in the election of Robert H. D. White for the seat. When White arrived at Gloucester township after the declaration of the results, he was escorted through the town by his supporters. The horses were taken out of his buggy, "which was dragged by his friends".

=== The 'Tahlee' estate ===
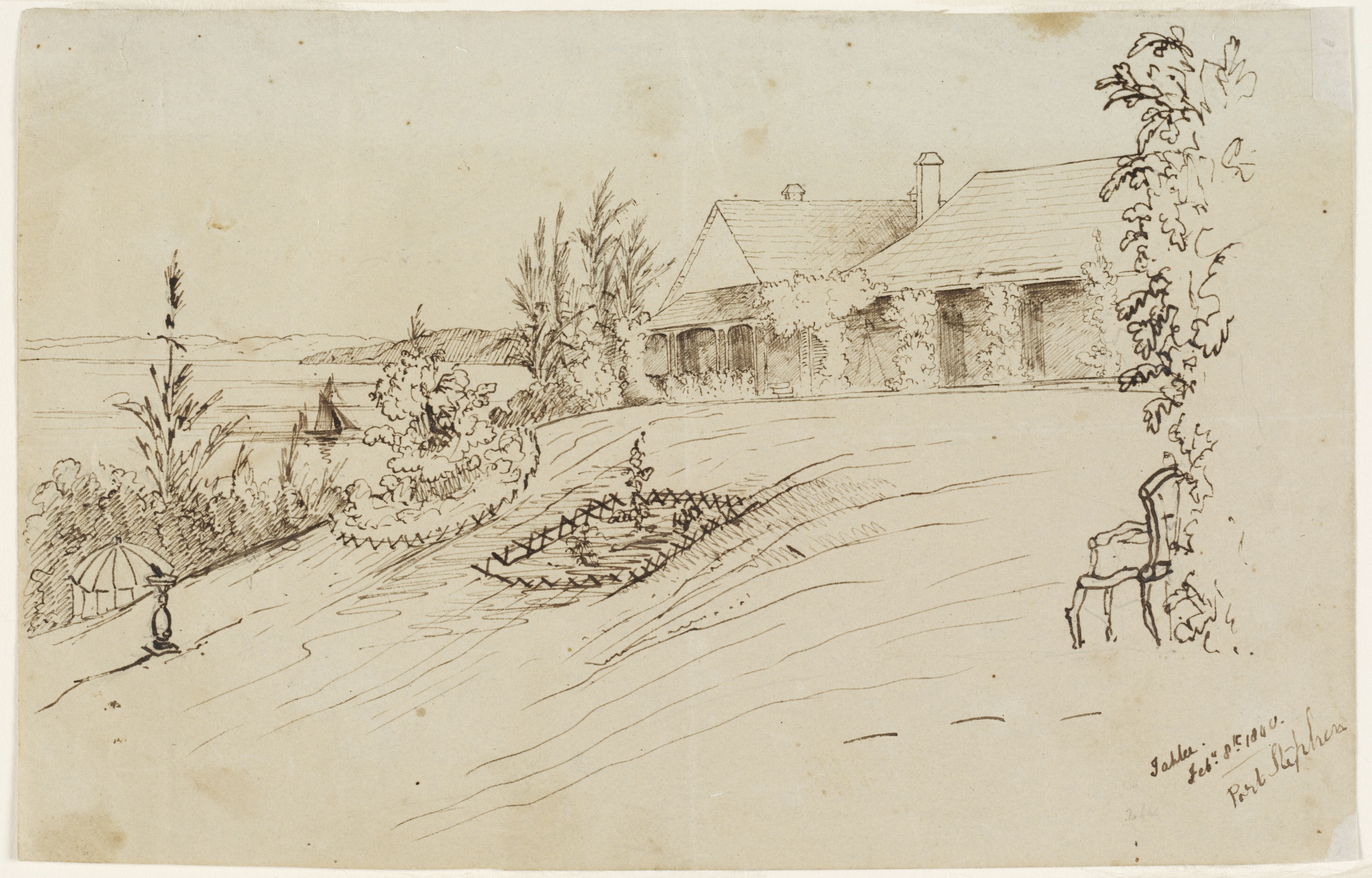
A sketch dated 1840 of the residence at 'Tahlee', overlooking Port Stephens.

White's inheritance of a "very great wealth", brought about by the lawsuit against his grandfather, enabled him "to practically exemplify the liberality and charity which were ever a part of his creed".

White purchased the 'Tahlee' residence and estate, possibly as early as late 1880, situated near the mouth of the Karuah River on the northern shores of Port Stephens, near the village of Carrington and north-west of Nelson Bay.^{[B]} 'Tahlee', made up of 108 acres (44 hectares), had been the headquarters of the Australian Agricultural Company. After his return from Europe in 1882 White set about revitalising the 'Tahlee' estate. A new residence and outbuildings were built, and extensive gardens established. He established vineyards and an orchard on the property and leased a number of oyster beds in the adjoining waters of Port Stephens. A visitor to 'Tahlee' in 1884 described White as "the king of Port Stephens", who lived at the estate "when Parliament does not demand his presence in Sydney". The writer observed: "Here at Tahlee his Majesty during the recess dispenses a right royal hospitality to white fellows and blackfellows indiscriminately". He described White as "a famous shot with a rifle, an ardent fisherman and sportsman, and is a general favourite".

In 1888 the house on 'Tahlee' was described as "one of the most commodious and comfortable marine residences in the northern district". In front of the main building was a substantial lawn tennis ground, enclosed with wire netting, complete with "an ornamental conservatory and lounge for the tennis players". Set apart from the main structure was "an organ room and several bedrooms", with a billiard room and bathrooms in the course of construction. The various outbuildings included servants' rooms, kitchens, store rooms, carpenter's and blacksmith's shops, a harness room, and an engine room with a gasoline-powered generator and battery storage "for lighting the whole premises with electricity". The property was served by an extensive wharf and boat sheds. The description of 'Tahlee' published in the Maitland Mercury made the observation that "through the hospitable invitations of the genial host, Tahlee is often visited by the elite of Sydney, who thoroughly enjoy themselves" with activities such as fishing, shooting and boating, "and regret when the hour arrives for their leaving such a haven of bliss".

Guests arrived at 'Tahlee' by boat, landing at the wharf below the residence, and conveyed by horse-drawn tram up the hillside. Twelve gardeners were employed to tend the extensive terraced gardens, which included summer houses and aviaries. In about 1890 a separate billiard room and ballroom was built on the estate.

=== Political career ===
After his election as the member for Gloucester in December 1882, White supported the government of Alexander Stuart. At the election held in October 1885, White was elected unopposed.

In 1886 White travelled to Europe with his family to benefit his health and represent the colony of New South Wales at the Colonial and Indian Exhibition in London. White brought with him two "beautifully-carved emu eggs set in silver", which were exhibited in the New South Wales section of the Exhibition. When Queen Victoria attended the event she "greatly admired" the carved eggs. In July 1886 White, with his wife and eldest daughter, were invited to Windsor Castle where he presented the pair of carved emu eggs to the Queen, which were "graciously accepted". The eggs were left in the Exhibition until its close, after which they were to be placed in "the collection of objects of interest which adorns the Grand Corridor" at Windsor Castle. In August 1886 White was elected a Fellow of the Royal Colonial Institute in London.

During the return voyage from England with his family aboard the R.M.S. Bengal, White's eldest son, aged 18 years, died on 26 December 1886 from inflammation of the lungs. On his return in January 1887, coinciding with the dissolution of the New South Wales parliament, White announced his retirement from public life. Although "renovated in bodily health", he stated the reason for his decision was that he was "grievously depressed by a severe family affliction".

In December 1887 the Government announced the appointment of ten additional members to the New South Wales Legislative Council, one of whom was Robert H. D. White. The appointments, operative from February 1888, brought the total number of members in the Upper House to 69, nine more than the chamber had previously ever possessed. White remained a member of the New South Wales Upper House until his death in October 1900.

=== Later years ===
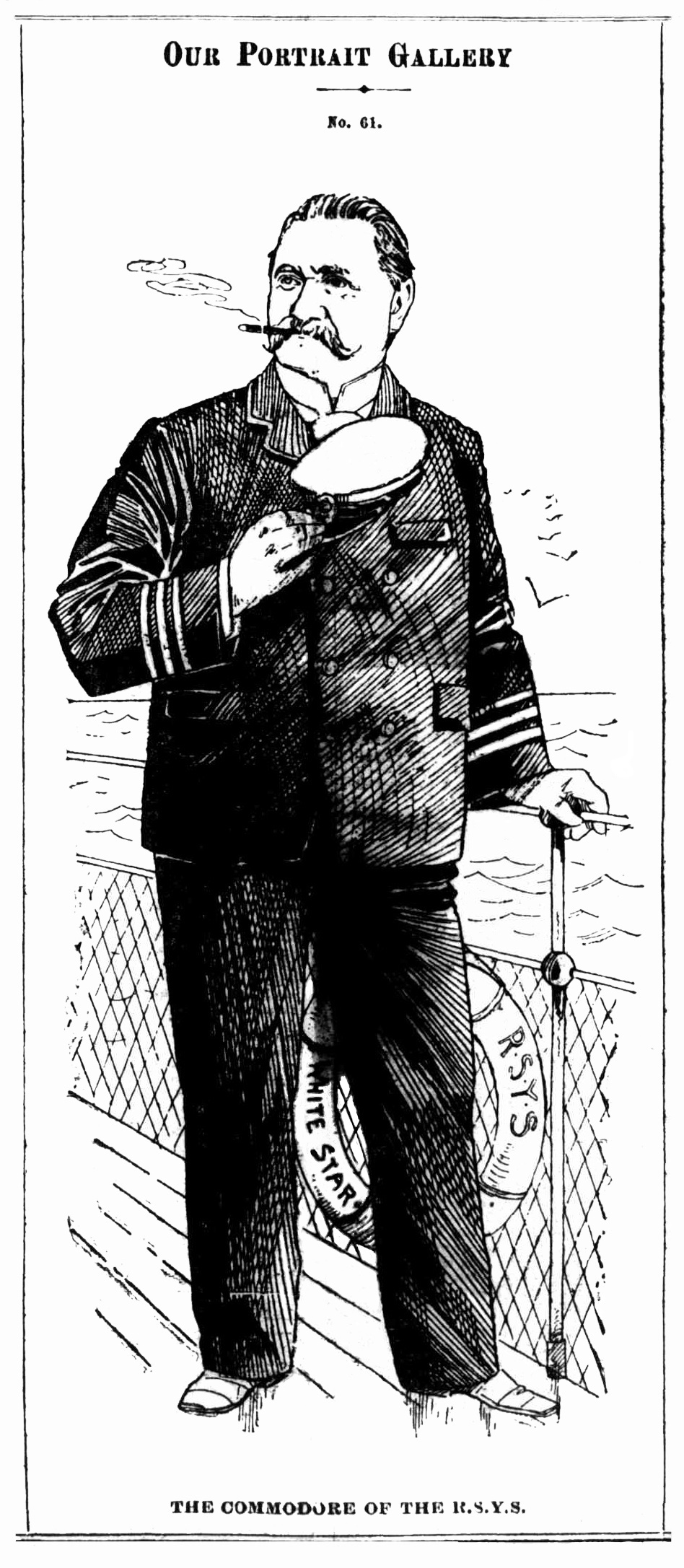
Portrait of Robert H. D. White, commodore of the Royal Sydney Yacht Squadron (published in September 1895).

White had a new steam yacht built for him by William Dunn, at his boatbuilder's shed at Berry's Bay in North Sydney. The vessel, named the White Star, was designed by E. W. Cracknell and had an overall length of 105 feet (32 metres). The boat had a frame-work of iron and steel, with a keel of spotted gum, with a steam engine imported from England. The White Star was launched in March 1889. White captained the White Star himself and used the vessel for his trips between Sydney and his estate at Port Stephens. White also owned a "small pleasure yacht" named the Kingfisher which was restricted to the coastal rivers.

White was a member of Aborigines Protection Board from February 1893. In July 1893 the Board approved the removal of aborigines at Nelson Bay to the Karuah reserve, about 14 miles (22.5 km) distant. White was appointed to assist "the removal and supervise the settlement". In 1894 and 1895 White served as a Royal Commissioner on Fisheries.

In 1896 and 1897 White held the position of commodore of the Royal Sydney Yacht Club. During May 1896 an intercolonial rowing carnival was held on the Parramatta River in the vicinity of Ryde in north-west Sydney. White, as commodore of the local yacht club, invited the visiting oarsmen to a trip around Sydney Harbour in his steam yacht, the White Star Two members of the Victorian crew, who were "manual labourers", were not invited and, in consequence, "the Victorians as a body declined the invitation".

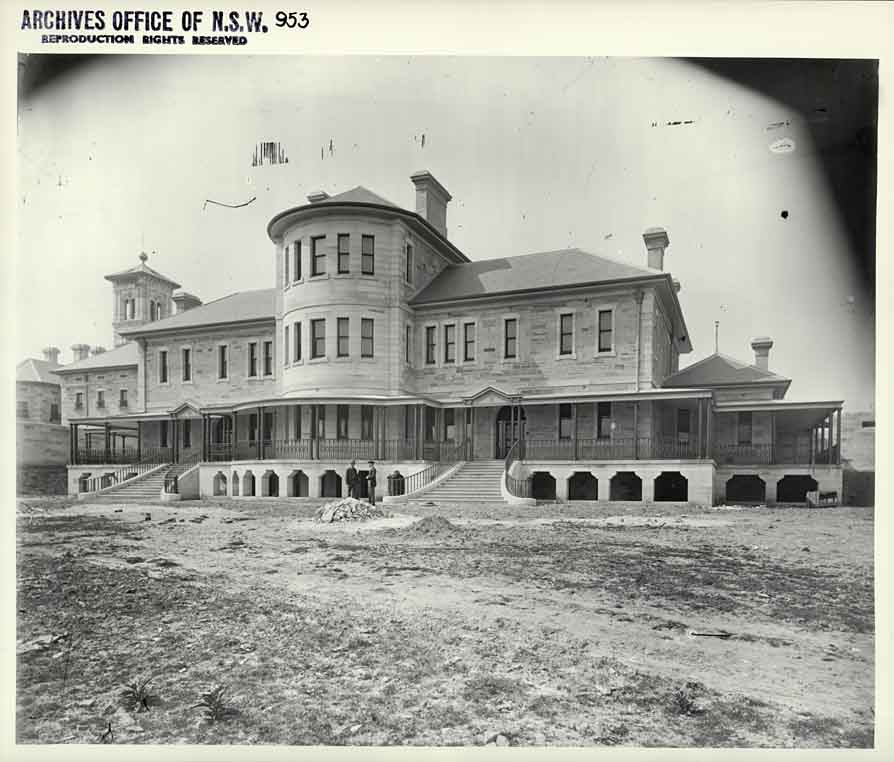
The Hospital for the Insane at Callan Park.

In June 1898 it was reported that White was "suffering from a mental malady which has necessitated his receiving treatment at Callan Park Asylum". The nature of his illness was described as "softening of the brain, brought on by excessive indulgence in alcohol". By February 1899 White remained an inmate at Callan Park.

In November 1899 the Sydney Truth published an article about leprosy in Queensland. The article reported that the Queensland government kept a special 'leper steamer' in "constant commission" at Thursday Island, for the transportation of Kanaka and Chinese lepers to a lazarette on Friday Island. The previous steamer had been replaced in 1898 by the White Star, the Sydney yacht formerly owned by White. The article commented: "What an end for the two", adding, "The owner a lunatic, ending his days in a madman's cell; the once trim and taut yacht ending its career in the service of alien lepers in a sister colony". After White's death it was reported that the nature of his dementia was "harmless, and he never gave the attendants any trouble".

White remained an inmate at the Hospital for the Insane at Callan Park until his death on 28 October 1900, aged 62 years.

A summary of White's life after his death, published in Grafton's Clarence and Richmond Examiner, observed that his gaining of "a large fortune" in 1880 "was the worst thing that could have happened to him". The writer explained that White "had no literary nor artistic tastes" and "had to look for most of his pleasure in clubs", adding: "Liver troubles came, and the final result was the wreck of the mind". The obituary concluded: "A fine possession is money if the owner knows how to use it; but when it is employed mainly for the purposes of pleasure there is no greater curse in existence".

White's widow, Eliza, died in August 1927 at her residence in Raglan Street, Mosman, aged 83 years. Her estate was valued at £51,569.

== Notes ==
A.The incident of the bank robbery at Deniliquin, early in White's career with the Bank of New South Wales, was later recounted in a simplistic and modified version to suggest that White's role had been critical to the capture of the bank robbers. This version can be summarised as follows: After he was released White started in pursuit of the bushrangers, with the assistance of a young Aboriginal tracker; they spent the night tracking the men and managed to recover some of the stolen gold and notes, and obtained information which led to the capture of the culprits.

B.Robert H. D. White may have purchased the "Tahlee" residence and estate, on the northern shoreline of Port Stephens, soon after the resolution of his lawsuit in the Victorian Supreme Court in August 1880. White's father, James C. White, is recorded as residing at "Tahlee" as early as January 1881. In the later years of his life, James C. White divided his time between the homes of his sons by his first and second marriage, in New South Wales, Queensland and New Zealand.

New South Wales Legislative Assembly
Preceded by Archibald Jacob	Member for Gloucester; 1882–1887	Succeeded by Jonathan Seaver
