= Mark Carrington (cricketer) =

New Zealand cricketer (1961–2026)

Personal information
- Full name: Sidney Mark Carrington
- Born: 19 August 1961; Gisborne, New Zealand
- Died: 16 April 2026 (aged 64)
- Batting: Right-handed
- Bowling: Right-arm medium-fast

Domestic team information
- Years: Team
- 1981/82–1986/87: Northern Districts
- Source: Cricinfo, 15 October 2020

Sidney Mark Carrington (19 August 1961 – 16 April 2026) was a New Zealand cricketer who played for Northern Districts in the 1980s. He also played for the Poverty Bay in the Hawke Cup.

== Biography ==
Carrington was born in Gisborne on 19 August 1961, and was educated at Gisborne Boys' High School. He was one of the first people of Māori descent to represent Northern Districts. He died on 16 April 2026, at the age of 64.
