= Tahlee Bible College =

Christian training centre in Port Stephens, Australia

Tahlee Bible College (TBC) is a Christian training centre. It functioned for nearly 70 years as an interdenominational training centre situated at Tahlee, a 170-acre (0.69 km^{2}) property on the shores of Port Stephens, Australia, less than one hour north of Newcastle and less than three hours north of Sydney.

TBC provided classes in English, Bible topics and ministry skills. The Bible College was just one of several ministries that operated from the property. Camps and events for children, young people and families are still held onsite, as are tours of the historic buildings. Tahlee Ministries Inc. is the organisation that oversees activities at Tahlee.

== History ==
=== The Gospel Fishermen ===
In 1943, the Gospel Fishermen Mission leased Tanilba House, which is 8 km (5 mi) directly across the bay from Tahlee. The Director, Godrey Theobald, had developed a three pronged approach to mission.

- Evangelists travelling in "Gospel Vans" visited isolated districts.
- Large meetings were held in churches in Newcastle and the Hunter valley.
- Children's camps were held at Tanilba for the purpose of evangelism.

In 1948, the staff of Gospel Fishermen visited Tahlee for a picnic. Over the next year, applications to rent the property to the mission were forwarded to the owner, Mr. Alfrey Beecher Stewart White, who used Tahlee as a holiday house. In June 1949, the Theobald family moved into the Waterfront Cottage and began using the ballroom and billiard room for their work. In 1959, Mr White offered the property to the Gospel Fishermen, who bought the land and buildings using large donation.

Discussions with leaders of Mission Societies had revealed a certain need. Although excellent Bible, theological and missionary training was available, missionary candidates could not learn skills in carpentry, mechanics, bushcraft, agriculture, electrical work and other related skills. A committee of Mission Society leaders had been formed to inaugurate this course and Tahlee was eventually chosen as the most suitable venue. Mr. Frank Briggs, who had been a missionary in Papua New Guinea, became the Superintendent of this Pioneer Missionary Training Camp in 1951.

Reverend Eric Potter, a Methodist minister, was the first Principal of Tahlee Bible College and Godfrey Theobald held the position of the first College President. Lectures commenced on 10 June 1959, while the public opening held on 31 October of that year attracted 400 people.

By 1979 the Bible College ministry was in serious decline, with fewer than 20 students enrolled. The appointment of Rev. Ray Laird as principal helped to reverse this decline. His primary achievements were gaining accreditation with the Australian College of Theology so that degree programs (Licentiate of Theology; Diploma in Ministry; Diploma in Missiology) could be offered. This helped to improve both the standards of education, as well as the viability of the Bible College.

In 1998 Tahlee Bible College received accreditation in its own right with VETAB to offer the Short Course in TESOL Studies, and in 1999, after more than five years of work, accreditation was granted for the Certificate of Theology (VETAB) and Diploma in Theology (Higher Education).

Over the years more than 1000 students have been trained at the college.
