= Karuah, New South Wales =

Karuah
- Suburb
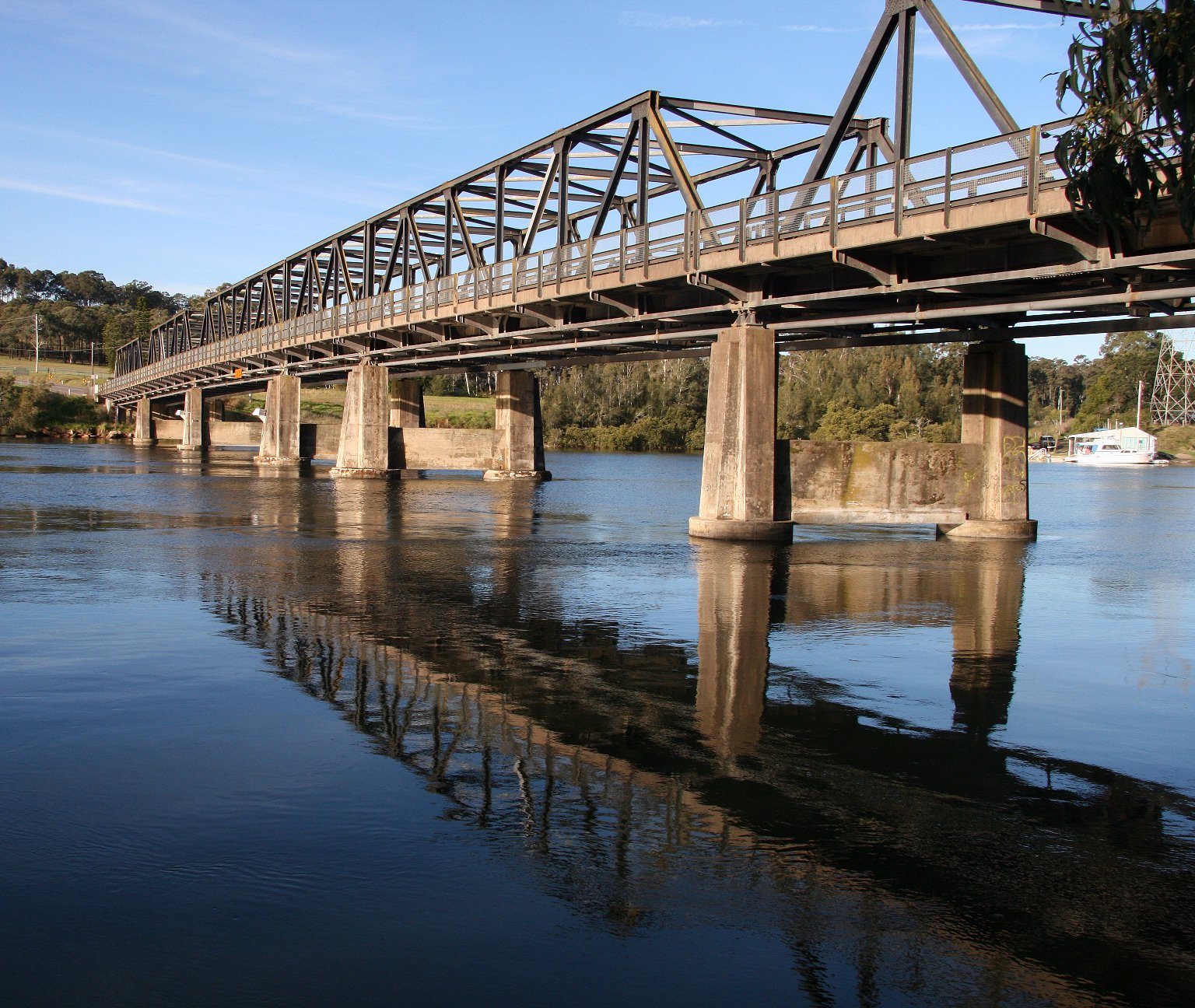
- Bridge over the Karuah River

- Coordinates: 32°38′35″S 151°57′26″E
- Country: Australia
- State: New South Wales
- Region: Hunter, Mid North Coast
- LGAs: Port Stephens Council; Mid-Coast Council
- Location: 192 km (119 mi) NNE of Sydney; 52 km (32 mi) NNE of Newcastle; 27 km (17 mi) NE of Raymond Terrace; 112 km (70 mi) SSW of Forster/Tuncurry

Government
  - State electorate: Port Stephens
  - Federal division: Lyne

Area (Note: Area calculation is based on 1:100000 map 9232 NEWCASTLE.)
  - Total: 73.7 km^{2} (28.5 sq mi)
- Elevation: 16 m (52 ft)

Population
  - Total: 1,411 (2016 census)
  - Density: 19.145/km^{2} (49.59/sq mi)
- Time zone: UTC+10 (AEST)
  - Summer (DST): UTC+11 (AEDT)
- Postcode: 2324
- County: Gloucester
- Parish: Tarean
- Mean max temp: 23.0 °C (73.4 °F)
- Mean min temp: 10.3 °C (50.5 °F)
- Annual rainfall: 1,145.6 mm (45.10 in)
Suburbs around Karuah
Limeburners Creek	Limeburners Creek	The Branch
Twelve Mile Creek	Karuah	The Branch, North Arm Cove
Twelve Mile Creek	Swan Bay, Port Stephens	Port Stephens, Tahlee, Carrington

Karuah (/kəˈruːə/) is a locality in both the Port Stephens and Mid-Coast Councils, the Port Stephens lga side is part the Hunter Region while the Mid-Coast lga is in the Mid North Coast region of New South Wales, Australia. It is thought that the name means 'native plum tree' in the local Aboriginal dialect.

== History ==
In 1790, five convicts escaped from Sydney and relocated to the area. In 1795 the Karuah River was first surveyed as part of a wider survey of Port Stephens. In 1811 Governor Lachlan Macquarie decided to name the area the Clyde. By 1816 permits were issued to allow cedar cutting in the area. In 1824 the Australian Agricultural Company purchased a million acres to create the township. In 1907 the name was changed from Sawyers Point to Karuah.

== Geography ==
Karuah is split between the Port Stephens and Mid-Coast councils with most (approximately 51%) located in the Port Stephens Council area. The village of Karuah is also split between the two councils with almost all of the village located in Port Stephens Council. The Karuah River, which runs approximately north to south through the centre of Karuah, forms the border between the two councils within the locality. Karuah is located at the north-western corner of Port Stephens into which the Karuah River feeds.

== Demographics ==
According to the 2016 census, there 1,411 people in Karuah.

- Aboriginal and Torres Strait Islander people made up 14.6% of the population.
- 80.1% of people were born in Australia and 89.8% of people spoke only English at home.
- The most common responses for religion were Anglican 26.7%, No Religion 25.0% and Catholic 19.9%.

The largest settlement within the locality is the village of Karuah, which is on the old Pacific Highway and straddles the Karuah River. Most of the village, which occupies only about 0.7 square kilometres (0.3 sq mi) of the suburb's total area of 74.7 km^{2} (28.8 sq mi), lies within the Port Stephens LGA. It includes the largest Aboriginal community in the Port Stephens LGA and, at the 2006 Census, had a population of approximately 857. The rest of the suburb's population live in the rural properties which surround the village.

== Transport ==
The Karuah bridge was built and opened in December 1957. In 2004, the Karuah Bypass was opened which, as part of the AusLink program, speeds up car and truck travel times past the township but left the town a backwater.

== Oyster industry ==
Karuah village has long been known for its oysters, and a number of oyster shops line the old Pacific Highway within the town.
