= William Carrington =

English accountant (1904–1975)

Sir William Speight Carrington (20 February 1904 – 6 May 1975) was an English accountant.

== Early life and education ==
William Speight Carrington was born on 20 February 1904 and was the son of William Carrington (1874-1962) of Blackpool and Jane Croft Speight (1878-1918) of Lancashire. He was schooled at Hebden Bridge in Yorkshire and then Manchester Grammar School.

== Career ==
Carrington qualified as a chartered accountant in 1926 and joined Whinney, Smith and Whinney of London in 1928, becoming a partner in 1932. He was a senior partner of its successor, Whinney Murray and Co. from 1967 to 1970. Whinney Murray and Co. evolved into the modern firm Ernst & Young.

He was elected a member of the Institute of Chartered Accountants in England and Wales's council in 1942, sitting until 1968; he was the Institute's President for the year 1955–56. He was also a member of the Central Valuation Board under the Coal Nationalisation Act 1946, a Member of the Tucker Committees on taxation of trading profits, a Member of the Royal Commission on Taxation from 1951 to 1955 and a Younger Brother of Trinity House in 1952.

Carrington was knighted in the 1958 Birthday Honours. He was knighted because of his contributions to the accounting profession in the United Kingdom.

Carrington served on the Royal Commission on the Taxation of Profits and Income, chaired by Lord Justice Lionel Cohen and appointed under the authority of King George VI The Commission served to examine taxation's impact on both industry and ordinary workers, specifically Tax code (PAYE).

== Personal life ==
In 1932, Carrington married Dorothy Mary, daughter of Thomas William Fabian, and they had one son, William David Carrington. He retired in 1970 and died on 6 May 1975 at his home in Penzance.
