= North Arm Cove, New South Wales =

North Arm Cove
- Suburb
- Coordinates: 32°37′31″S 152°02′39″E
- Country: Australia
- State: New South Wales
- Region: Hunter; Mid North Coast
- LGA: Mid-Coast Council
- Location: 203 km (126 mi) NNE of Sydney; 63 km (39 mi) NNE of Newcastle; 106 km (66 mi) SSW of Forster–Tuncurry; 19 km (12 mi) W of Tea Gardens

Government
  - State electorate: Port Stephens
  - Federal division: Lyne
- Elevation: 32 m (105 ft)

Population
  - Total: 491 (2021)
- Time zone: UTC+10 (AEST)
  - Summer (DST): UTC+11 (AEDT)
- Postcode: 2324
- County: Gloucester
- Parish: Mount George
- Mean max temp: 27.3 °C (81.1 °F)
- Mean min temp: 8.4 °C (47.1 °F)
- Annual rainfall: 1,348.9 mm (53.11 in)
Suburbs around North Arm Cove
The Branch	The Branch	Nerong
Karuah, Carrington	North Arm Cove	Tea Gardens, Pindimar, North Arm Cove
Port Stephens	Port Stephens	Port Stephens

North Arm Cove is a suburb of the Mid-Coast Council local government area in the center of the Hunter and the southern extremity of the Mid North Coast regions of New South Wales, Australia. It is located adjacent to Port Stephens and extends well north of the Pacific Highway. The suburb is sparsely populated, with most of the residents living in the southern portion of the suburb.

== History ==
=== 1918 subdivision ===
Port Stephens was under consideration as the main seaport for New South Wales, as well as the national capital, and a large city-style subdivision of the North Arm Cove peninsula was designed by Walter Burley Griffin, under the name "Port Stephens City".

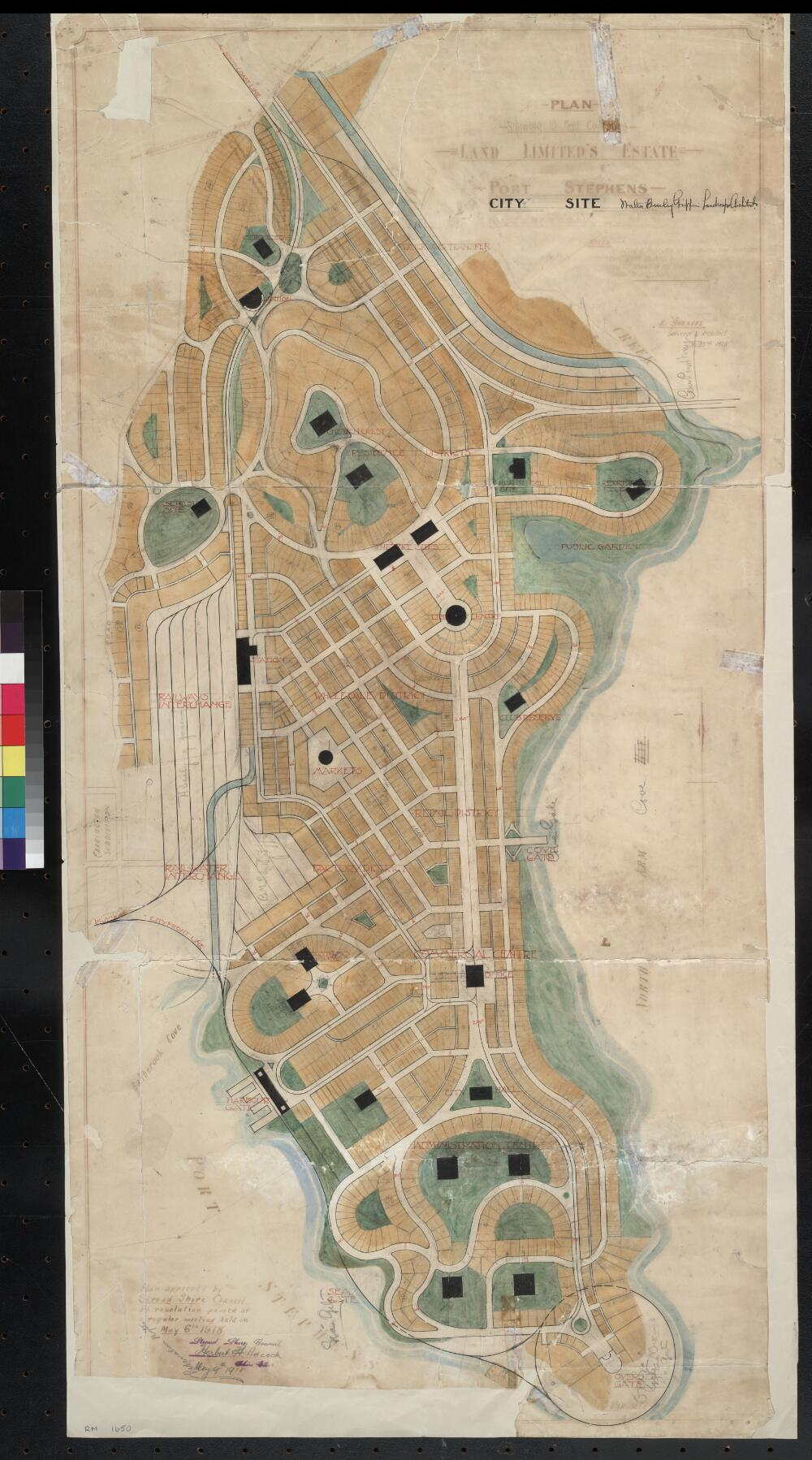
Walter Burley Griffin's original plan for Port Stephens City - May 06, 1918

Unlike the previously made plans for octagonal-shaped Canberra or Griffith (1914), Port Stephens City was designed to fit into the narrow finger-shaped bay peninsula. Despite this, the layout is clearly recognizable for its embodiment of Griffin's design concepts, particularly in its use of central hubs with radiating roads, connected by wide boulevards. The design provided for various urban city functions, grouped into precincts or urban zones. The major railway terminus and rail-water interchange (the port) was planned on the western side of the peninsula, toward Carrington village, with nearby Customs House and Administration Centre occupying the land to the east of the rail and port links. Adjacent to the north of this governance district, the land was reserved for a commercial centre and a factory district, forming an employment zone of the future city. Further north, there was a retail district lining the main boulevard, with a market square and wholesale district conveniently located to the east of the main railway station. A residential district was planned to the north, toward the old Pacific Highway. Within the residential zone, Griffin had also reserved three large lots for two primary schools and one high school, a church site, two theatre sites, a library centre and a public recreation reserve. Plans were approved by Stroud Shire Council on 6 May 1918.

Marion Mahony Griffin credited her husband, in her unpublished biography "The Magic of America", with the identification of the locality as one of only two ‘natural seaports’ in Australia. She wrote that ‘in his innocence he interested a client, who was carrying on a considerable real estate business, in the opportunity offered at Port Stephens… It was surveyed and staked out and the allotments rapidly sold’.

During the work on surveying this land, the Griffins had their first encounter with local Australian Aboriginal people, and that is where their interaction with, and love for, Australian native vegetation started.

"Contact with the ancient peoples should awaken us to the fact that they use a different kind of thinking from ourselves; an experience which, if we were open minded, would lead us on to the investigating and mastering of that kind of thinking, to take as much pains as we have taken in the mastery of rational thinking in these modern times."

Plans were extended and modified, and the land further subdivided, in the early 1920s by Henry Halloran, a well-known surveyor, planner and leading property developer at the time. However, the branch rail line (originally planned to join the main north line at Stroud) was never built, and the Griffins' plan for a thriving city could not succeed without it. The subdivision remained a paper dream, and only the waterfront areas on the southern shores of the peninsula were granted building permissions. Many of the dirt roads in the paper subdivision, still visible from the air and designated in mapping services, date from the original subdivision.

=== Land use today ===
Except for the waterfront and near-waterfront lots on the southern end of the North Arm Cove peninsula ("the village"), land from the 1918 subdivision is now zoned "non-urban", meaning that construction of dwellings is not permitted, although, constructions in line with current exempt developments that relate to RU2 zoned land is applicable and many such developments have been completed or are currently under construction. The local population is concentrated in the village of North Arm Cove, located on the western shore of North Arm Cove itself, and on the northern shore of Port Stephens. Only a limited number of residential blocks are available, making the village a sought-after retreat, as DA approvals although successful take a significant time. Many of the small "holiday houses" that ignored the original restrictions have been developed using Grandfather permissions.

North of the Pacific Highway, land use is mainly rural, and kangaroos and wallabies are commonly found throughout the area.

Land sales in the North Arm Cove paper subdivision have been the subject of controversy for many years, even being raised as a matter in the NSW Parliament. In 2013, the NSW Parliament passed legislation for dealing with historic "paper subdivisions" (Schedule 5, Environmental Planning and Assessment Act 1979, NSW) together with Guidelines for achieving full subdivision status. In 2024, the NSW Department of Planning directed Mid-Coast Council to include North Arm Cove as potential residential land (C4 zoning), rather than non-developable land (C3 zoning), in their updated Local Environment Plan. Despite this, Mid-Coast Council has reiterated that there are no plans to rezone for urban purposes any paper subdivisions within their jurisdiction.

Nevertheless, many non-urban blocks are purchased as an investment and/or for use as a weekend retreat. Some landowners have owned their lots for 30 years or more. Others sell when they become frustrated with paying land rates for lots they have little scope to use. Owners of non-urban lots have, in recent years, sought to use social media and the internet to band together to create a more cohesive voice.

=== Progress towards realizing the Griffins' vision ===
==== North Arm Cove Initiative ====
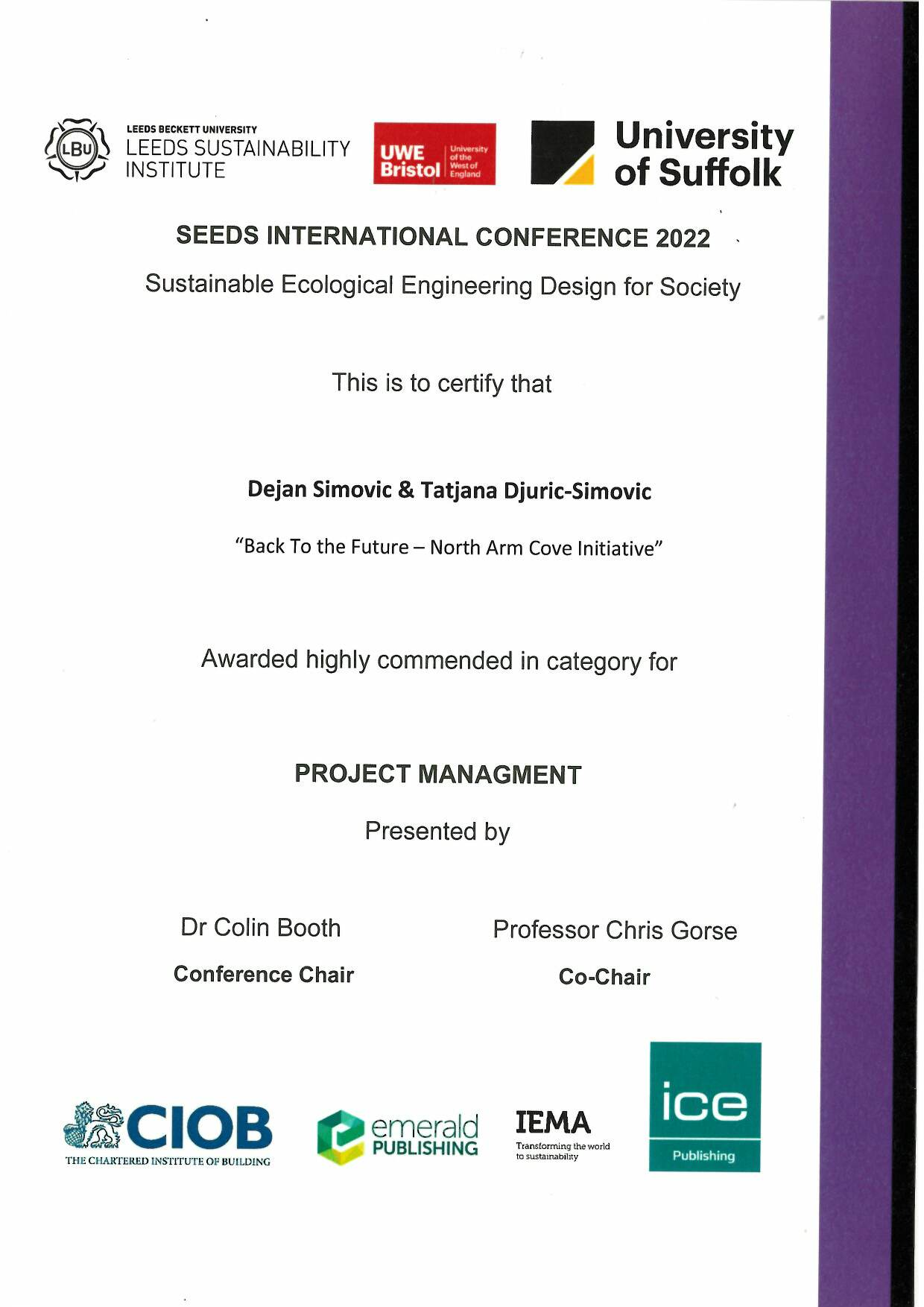
"Back to the future - North Arm Cove Initiative" - SEEDS Conference 2022 - Award, Project Management, High Commendation

In 2019, a group of North Arm Cove (NAC) landowners, with assistance from a team of architects and planners from DESIM-Arch, laid the foundations of the "North Arm Cove Initiative". Their aim was to promote urban development of North Arm Cove, incorporating the heritage plans of Walter Burley and Marion Mahony Griffin and using 21st Century technology to implement and improve the Griffins' vision, thereby creating a regenerative, resilient, sustainable, model precinct and community.

One of the first activities of the Initiative was organizing an Australia-wide student research competition, "Back to the future - North Arm Cove" "Back to the future - North Arm Cove", seeking to engage the vision of young architects and planners for the future of regional urban living in Australia. The competition involved an initial two weeks of lectures and online presentations by experts in heritage, urban planning, infrastructure and sustainability, setting out frameworks which the competition entrants could incorporate into their proposals. The winning submission was from the "Back on Track" team.

In 2022, a peer-reviewed research paper by DESIM-Arch's Tatjana Djuric-Simovic and Dejan Simovic – "Back to the future - North Arm Cove Initiative" – was presented at the international SEEDS Conference (Sustainable Ecological Engineering Design for Society) in Bristol, UK. The paper was awarded a High Commendation in the Project Management category. The research paper outlined a framework for planning, designing and developing sustainable communities based on Circular Economy principles. It contains a PESTEL analysis of constraints and opportunities for North Arm Cove's urban development, as well as a proposal for an innovative, collaborative development framework by means of a "Sustainability Research Centre - SRCe".

On 6th December 2024, North Arm Cove Initiative registered as the "Marion and Walter" Living Lab Co-operative Pty Ltd, a not-for-profit organization aimed at facilitating future planning, development and governance for the North Arm Cove subdivision, while preserving the heritage of one of Australia's foremost city planners.

North Arm Cove Land Owners Association.

In March 2026 a new group set up to represent the views of Non Urban Land Owners was formed. Primarily driven by the Mid Coast Councils mis management of the 800 or so lots that it has now taken control of. It has set out to highlight the many millions of rate income that the council has failed to collect over the last 10 years by not returning the lots back to public ownership, whilst consistently exacerbating the Fire Hazard status of the North Arm Cove subdivision by neglecting its responsibilities of land ownership. It also attempts to debunk the myth that nothing can be developed on North Arm Cove non urban land, demonstrating that a camping holiday facility is achievable.

==== Planning Authorities ====
In December 2022, the "Hunter Regional Plan 2041" was amended to include "PLANNING PRIORITY 6: Consider historical paper subdivisions", which stated that:

Local strategic planning by MidCoast Council has examined the constraints to development within paper subdivisions at North Arm Cove, Pindimar, Bundabah and Carrington, and made recommendations for future use. Preliminary analysis indicates that in many of these sites, infrastructure provision for urban development is prohibitively expensive and environmental constraints are significant. Further investigation will identify whether options exist that could enable cost-effective development.

In March 2024, the NSW Department of Planning, Housing and Infrastructure made a determination on MidCoast Council's Draft LEP (Local Environment Plan), which directed the Council to make amendments to its proposed LEP before it could be approved:

(m) amend the proposed local environmental plan for paper subdivision sites to: (i) seek to apply a C4 Environmental Living zone and 10 hectare minimum lot size,

The 10ha minimum lot size is a precautionary measure restricting individual building on lots before a Master Development Plan is approved. Development Plans must incorporate all relevant considerations, including (among other factors) the provision of infrastructure, preservation of the environment, cohesive planning controls, traffic flow, and detailed costings.

It is expected that the new MidCoast LEP, and consequent rezoning of the paper subdivision, will be gazetted early in 2026.
