= James M. Carrington =

American politician and photographer

James M. Carrington (April 17, 1904 – January 28, 1995) was a photographer and Democratic politician who served in the Missouri House of Representatives.

== Biography ==
Carrington was born in St. Louis, Missouri and attended Sumner High School. In 1925, he graduated from Howard University with a degree in electrical engineering. Carrington was the first African-American photographer for the St. Louis Globe-Democrat and the first African-American to represent St. Louis County in the Missouri House of Representatives.

Carrington was first elected to the Missouri House of Representatives in 1973. He was defeated in the 1976 election against James Whitmore by 12 votes, but returned to office after the results were overturned by the Missouri Supreme Court.
