= Jim Carrington =

British children's writer

Jim Carrington is an educationalist and writer of children's literature. Carrington was born in Norwich, Norfolk, England on 8 February 1977 and lives with his family in south west London.

== Education and career ==
Educated in state schools in Norfolk, Carrington went on to read English at Queen Mary, University of London, and trained to teach at South Bank University. He then gained an MA in Writing for Young People at Bath Spa University, where his work attracted the attention of Bloomsbury Publishing. He also teaches part-time in a state primary school in London. In 2011 Carrington appeared at Hayfever, the children's section of the Hay Festival.

== Writing ==
Carrington's novels fall within the genre of young adult fiction, early readers and chapter books. His first three novels, Inside My Head (2010), In the Bag (2011) and Drive By (2012), feature young protagonists whose lives reflect experiences with which teenagers and young adults in a twenty-first-century United Kingdom will be very familiar: bullying, anti-social behaviour, mental health issues, identity and relationships. Carrington's fourth YA novel, Boy 23 (2015), took a different course, creating a wider dystopian socio-political world through which he examines the violent society in which a virulent epidemic of unknown origin emerges. This is seen from the perspective of two teenagers whose earlier lives have been radically different from each other. A science-fiction comic novel for 7-11 year old readers is forthcoming.

He has also published shorter works, including an ongoing collection retelling traditional Malay and Javanese folktales for younger readers, featuring the clever mouse-deer folk character Sang Kancil. These form part of Cambridge Reading Adventures, a series of International Readers which constitute a primary-phase guided reading scheme created by the UCL Institute of Education International Literacy Centre in collaboration with Cambridge University Press. In 2016 Carrington was commissioned to create a series for LDA (Learning Disabilities Association), a provider of teaching supplies which support children with special educational needs (SEN). For this he created Otis the Robot, a friendly android character whose adventures help children who have autism spectrum condition to understand social skills. It is aimed at early years foundation stage and primary age children from 3–11 years old. The series follows Otis, who finds it hard to deviate from his programming and adapt to social situations. Each book explores a different social situation which commonly causes stress, misunderstanding or confusion about how to behave. Both the Sang Kancil and Otis the Robot series are illustrated by Juanbjuan Oliver.

== Awards ==
Inside My Head was nominated for the Carnegie Medal, the UKLA Book Award, the Branford Boase Award, and other regional UK awards.

Drive By James Reckitt Hull Children's Book Award 2013

== Bibliography ==
=== YA Novels ===
- Inside My Head (2010 ISBN 978-1-4088-0271-7 )
- In the Bag (2011 ISBN 978-1-4088-0270-0)
- Drive By (2012 ISBN 978-1-4088-2278-4)
- Boy 23 (2015 ISBN 978-1-4088-2277-7)

=== Sang Kancil series ===
(illustrated by Juanbjuan Oliver)

- Sang Kancil and the Tiger (2015 ISBN 978-1-1075-5092-6)
- Sang Kancil and Crocodile (2015 ISBN 978-1-1075-7604-9)
- Sang Kancil and the Farmer (2017 ISBN 978-1-1084-0574-4)

=== Otis the Robot series ===
(illustrated by Juanbjuan Oliver)

- Otis the Robot Manual (2017 ISBN 978-1-8550-3613-0)
- Otis the Robot Plays the Game (2017 ISBN 978-1-8550-3606-2)
- Otis the Robot Keeps his Cool (2017 ISBN 978-1-8550-3605-5)
- Otis the Robot Shares (2017 ISBN 978-1-8550-3604-8)
- Otis the Robot Meets a Supply Teacher (2017 ISBN 978-1-8550-3608-6)

=== Non-fiction ===
- A-Z of Autism: a guide for parents and professionals (2018 ISBN 978-1-85503-623-9)
