= Carrington, New South Wales (Mid-Coast Council) =

Carrington
- Suburb
- Coordinates: 32°39′39″S 152°01′05″E
- Country: Australia
- State: New South Wales
- LGA: Mid-Coast Council
- Location: 215 km (134 mi) NNE of Sydney; 66 km (41 mi) NNE of Newcastle; 110 km (68 mi) SW of Forster-Tuncurry; 19 km (12 mi) W of Tea Gardens; 40 km (25 mi) SW of Bulahdelah

Government
  - State electorate: Port Stephens
  - Federal division: Lyne
- Elevation: 9 m (30 ft)
- Time zone: UTC+10
  - Summer (DST): UTC+11
- Postcode: 2324
- County: Gloucester
- Parish: Carrington
Suburbs around Carrington
| North Arm Cove | North Arm Cove | North Arm Cove |
| Tahlee | Carrington | North Arm Cove |
| Port Stephens | Port Stephens | Port Stephens |

Carrington is a locality in the Mid-Coast Council local government area of the Hunter and Mid North Coast regions of New South Wales, Australia, located on the northern shores of Port Stephens.

Carrington was named in 1828 by Robert Dawson, the first commissioner of the Australian Agricultural Company. The Newcastle suburb of the same name is named after his grandson, Lord Carrington, who became Governor of New South Wales.

== Former church ==
A former church, built in 1847, which had subsequently been used as a youth hostel, is a heritage site.
