= Tea Gardens-Hawks Nest Bridge =

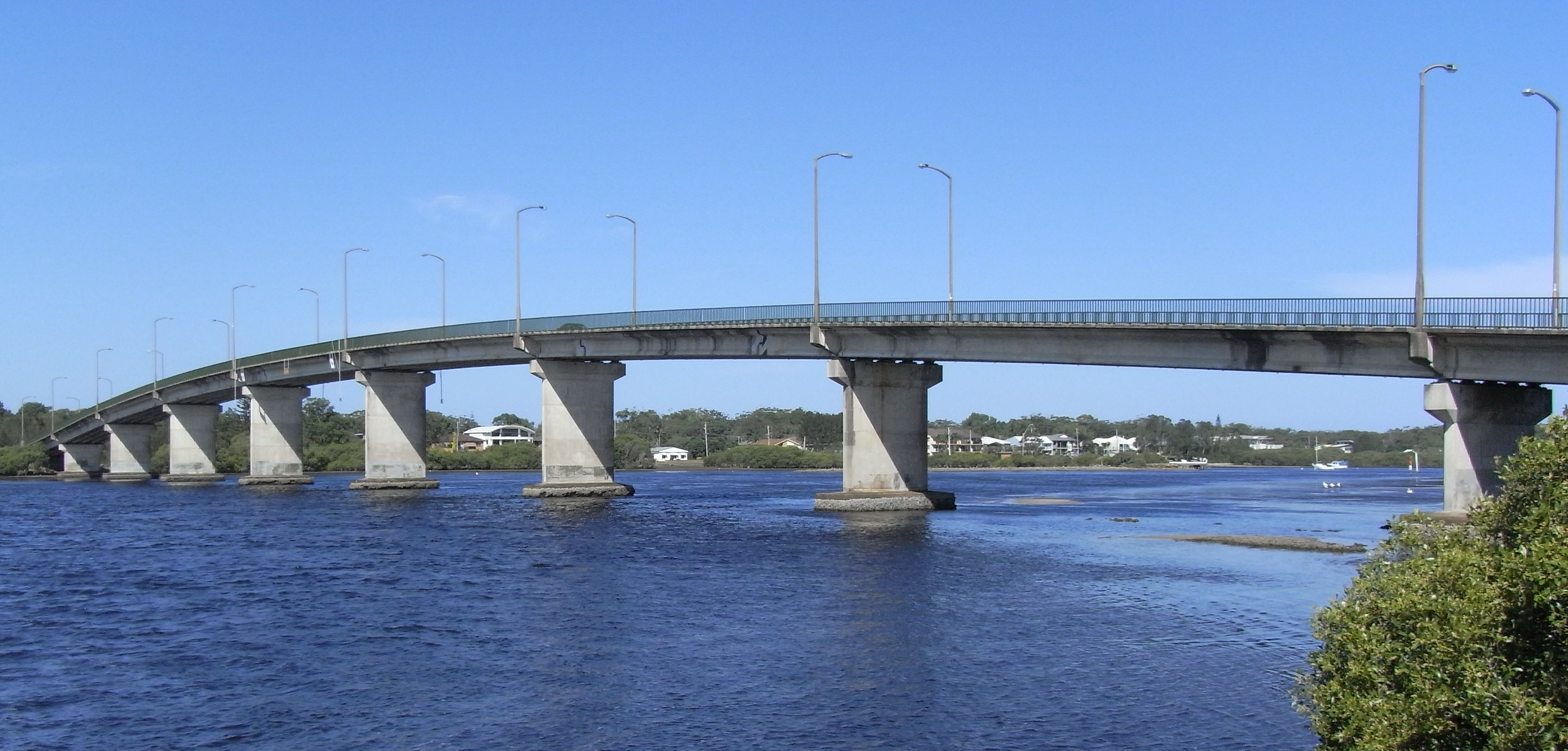
- Coordinates: 32°40′09″S 152°10′06″E
- Carries: Myall Street
- Crosses: Myall River
- Begins: Tea Gardens
- Ends: Hawks Nest
- Other name(s): Singing Bridge
- Named for: Tea Gardens, Hawks Nest
- Owner: Transport for NSW

Characteristics
- Design: Box girder
- Material: Prestressed & reinforced concrete
- Total length: 304.3 metres (998 ft)
- Width: 10.3 metres (34 ft)
- Longest span: 35.3 metres (116 ft)
- No. of spans: 5
- Piers in water: 8
- Clearance below: 10.6 metres (35 ft) (high water level)
- No. of lanes: 2

History
- Opened: 6 April 1974
- Replaces: Ferry service

The Tea Gardens-Hawks Nest Bridge is a road bridge that carries Myall Street across the Myall River, connecting the towns of Tea Gardens and Hawks Nest on the Mid North Coast of New South Wales, Australia.

The concrete box girder bridge is commonly known as the Singing Bridge, derived from the musical sounds its railings generate during strong winds acting as a wind harp.

== History ==
About 1928, a ferry service started carrying passengers between the two townships across the Myall River. Later, cars were added, resulting in peak queues during holiday periods of up to six hours. The Tea Gardens-Hawks Nest Bridge was completed and opened by the New South Wales Minister for Public Works on 6 April 1974. In response to this demand a A$1.2 million bridge was placed immediately downstream, eliminating the ferry service.

== Description ==
The bridge is of girder construction, made of both prestressed and reinforced concrete. It is 304.3 metres (998 ft) long, with seven 35.3-metre (116 ft) and two 28.3-metre (93 ft) spans. It carries a two-lane road 7.3 metres (24 ft) wide and two pedestrian walkways 1.5 metres (5 ft) wide. Clearance is 10.6 m (34.8 ft) at high water.

The Jean Shaw Koala Reserve is located at its northeastern end, part of a wildlife corridor to the Myall Lakes. Koalas have been known to cross the bridge at night.
