= Aboriginal and Torres Strait Islander Heritage Protection Act 1984 =

Act of the Parliament of Australia

Parliament of Australia
- Long title: An Act to preserve and protect places, areas and objects of particular significance to Aboriginals, and for related purposes
- Citation: No. 79 of 1984 or No. 79, 1984 as amended
- Territorial extent: States and territories of Australia
- Enacted: 25 June 1984
- Commenced: 25 June 1984
- Status: In force

The Aboriginal and Torres Strait Islander Heritage Protection Act 1984 (Cth), is an Act passed by the Parliament of the Commonwealth of Australia to enable the Commonwealth Government to intervene and, where necessary, preserve and protect areas and objects of particular significance to Australia's Aboriginal or Torres Strait Islander peoples from being desecrated or injured.

The Act has been considered ineffective to the legislation's purpose, as seen in court decisions and the minimal amendments and recommendations implemented. The minimal updates to the Act are dissimilar to the significant changes that have been made to other heritage protection acts such as the Native Title Act 1993 and the Environment Protection and Biodiversity Conservation Act 1999.

== Purpose and function ==
The Act was established as a "final resort" to heritage protection where state and territory protections were unsuccessful. As Senator Ryan stated when introducing the bill, "Where a State or Territory has no law capable of providing effective protection, or no action is being taken to give effect to that law, the Commonwealth will act in appropriate cases."

The Act defines "Aboriginal tradition" as:

the body of traditions, observances, customs and beliefs of Aboriginals generally or of a particular community or group of Aboriginals, and includes any such traditions, observances, customs or beliefs relating to particular persons, areas, objects or relationships.

The Federal Court of Australia has expanded the definition to require "a degree of antiquity to the traditions" whilst respecting intergenerational transmission may incorporate some variation.

"Areas of significance" can be Australian land- freehold, leasehold, private, national park or crown land- across states and territories, and internal waters or territorial seas. An area is considered injured or desecrated if it is used or treated in a manner inconsistent with Aboriginal traditions, including if a person's presence there would be inconsistent. The threat of injury or desecration must be specific; a declaration cannot be made against acts already taken, or potential acts in the future. The threat of injury or desecration also, cannot compel action such as developing a management plan.

Aboriginal human remains can be claimed as objects of significance however the Act has a limited definition of which Aboriginal human remains can be considered of particular significance to Aboriginal traditions.

== Key Cases ==
=== The Wamba Wamba case (1989) ===
An emergency declaration for area protection was made in 1989 on a development site for a golf course and country club. Before development, in 1986, archeological evidence found the area was likely to have skeletal remains dating back 30,000 years. Development was approved in 1987 and in December 1988, human remains were found in the construction site. Those remains were reburied however more were found and left on the golf course building site. Aboriginal custodians requested reburial in the same site and the movement of the club house and bowling green to an alternative area. Justice Lockhart noted: "[Burial sites] are the places which Aboriginals believe are the place of the spirits waiting to be called back, and, if the spirits are disturbed, the Aboriginal people believe that they will suffer because of the failure to care for them." Despite Justice Lockhart saying "undoubted historical significance and strength of Aboriginal tradition relating to land with which this case is concerned and land nearby raise questions of political sensitivity, high emotion and spiritual, as well as material, significance", the application was dismissed. The Minister has final power in determining site significance.

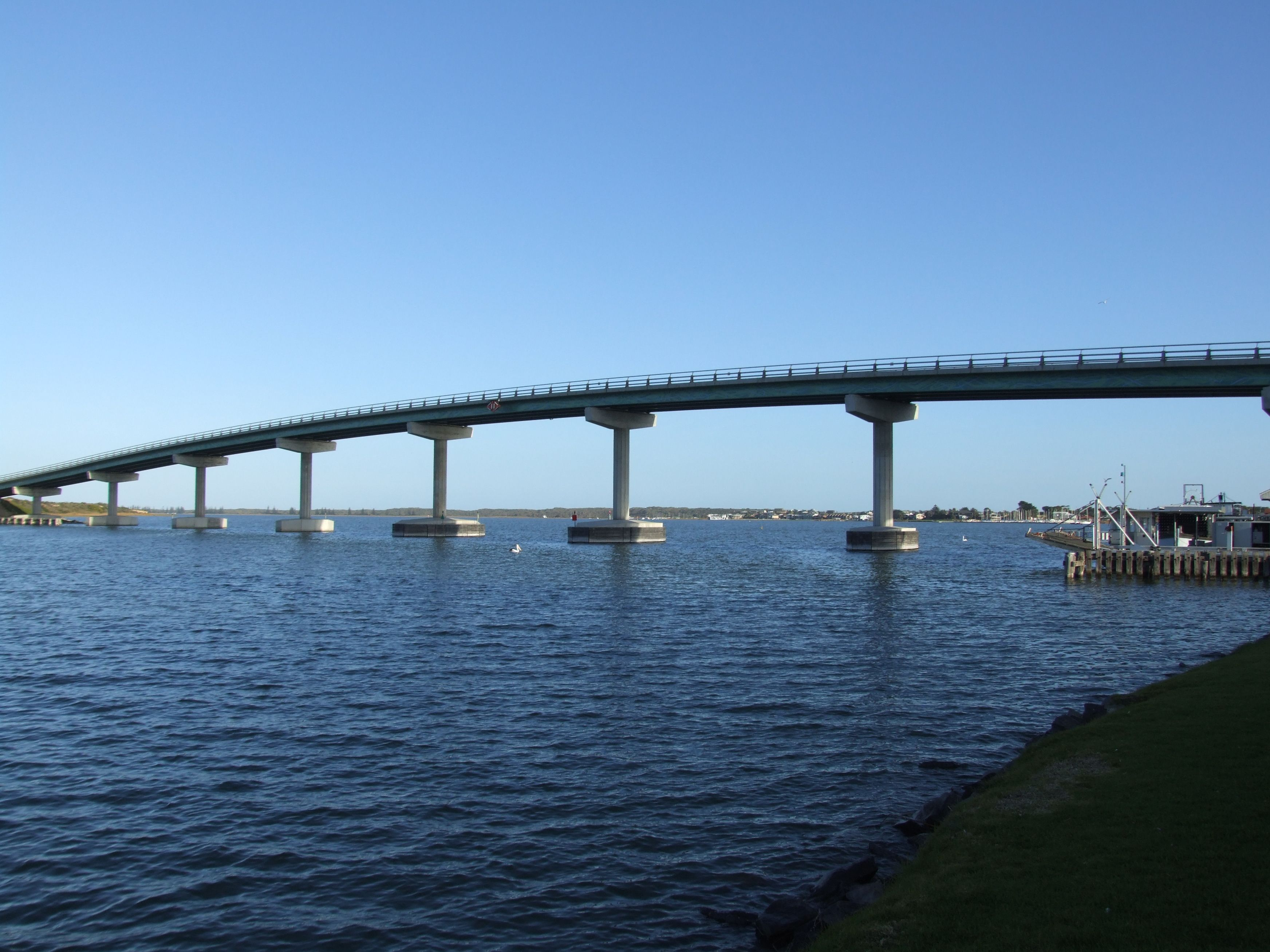
Hindmarsh Island Bridge

=== Hindmarsh island (Kumarangk) Cases (1995) ===
The area of Kumarangk or Hindmarsh island in 1995 was subject to a protection declaration which grew to national attention sparking the Hindmarsh Island bridge controversy. The site was not granted protection. Other issues around the proceedings went to federal court twice. Two cases in 1998 and another in 2001 attempted to dispute, or recover from, the findings but were dismissed. These cases offered a broader definition of ‘traditional’ and outlined that the minister, in making their decision, must consider all relevant material. This relevant material includes "the views of people who would be affected adversely by a declaration and any relevant matters, such as the financial effects of a declaration." However the protection of Aboriginal heritage is "to be given substantial weight by the Minister in exercising his or her discretion". The effect of these cases deterred Indigenous people from making applications due to confidentiality and publicity concerns., and was a contributing factor to the Evatt report.

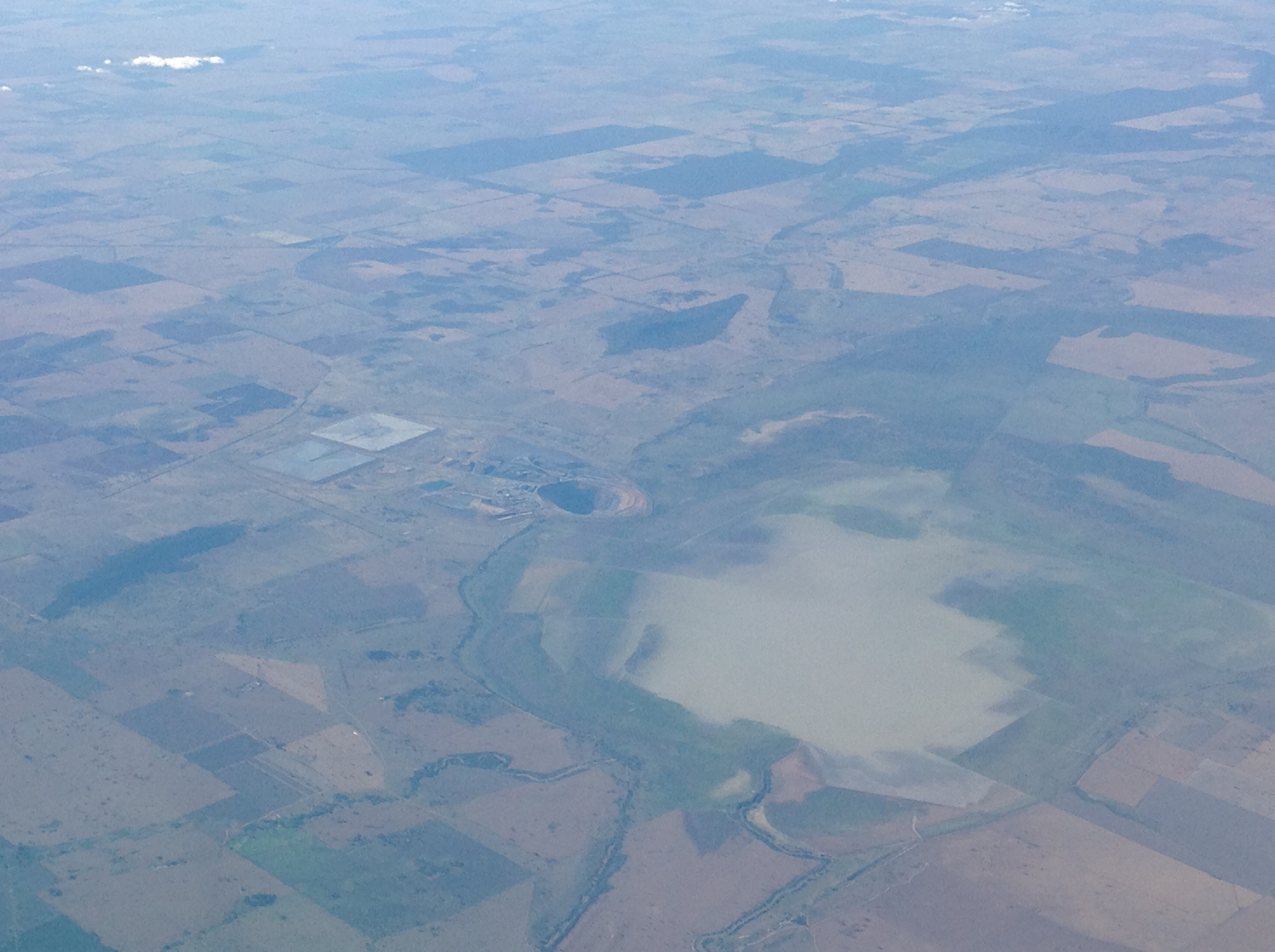
Lake Cowal (Williams)

=== Williams v Minister for the Environment and Heritage (2003) ===
In 2003, Wiradjuri man Neville Williams applied for an emergency declaration under the Act in response to Aboriginal artefacts found during exploratory drilling, granted under a mining lease at Lake Cowal. The Minister did not declare the site protected as he did not believe it met the threshold of significance. Williams sued the Minister for "failure to take into account a relevant consideration" and ‘unreasonableness. The claim of unreasonableness was unsuccessful as "a court is not entitled to strike down an administrative decision on the ground of unreasonableness simply because the judge would have decided the issue differently". However, the minister was ordered to reconsider the application. Lake Cowal is not under declared protection.

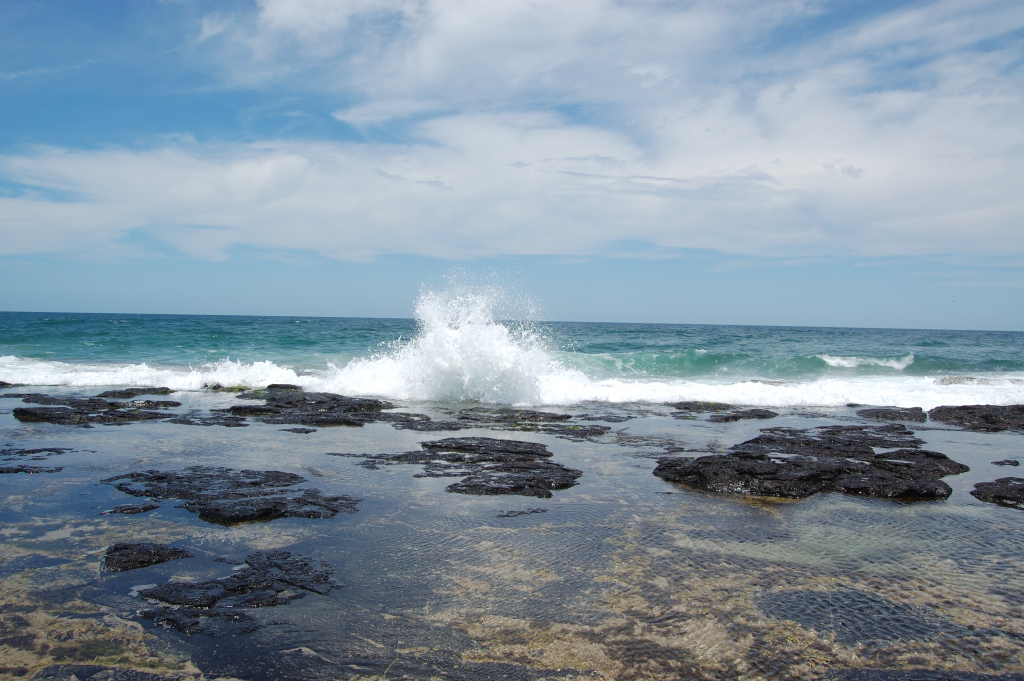
Angels Beach (Anderson)

=== Anderson v Minister for the Environment, Heritage and the Arts (2010) ===
In 2010, an emergency and permanent declaration application was made in response to a housing development on North Angels beach as the site was archaeologically significant, and was also the site of a massacre of Bundajalung people which occurred at Angels Beach in the nineteenth century. The minister refused to make a declaration which led to the court case. The Anderson siblings, both senior elders of the Numbahjing Clan of the Bundjalung Nation, were required to show the minister "acted perversely or had no logical basis for his decision" or lack thereof. They did not meet the threshold and the ministers’ decision was upheld and therefore the application was dismissed.

=== Destruction of Juukan Gorge ===
In July 2020, caves of great cultural and archaeological significance in Juukan Gorge, known as the only inland site in Australia to show signs of continuous human occupation for over 46,000 years, including through the last ice age, was deliberately destroyed by mining company Rio Tinto in May 2020. The destruction occurred legally under Western Australian legislation, the Aboriginal Heritage Act 1972. After a great outcry, a bipartisan parliamentary inquiry was announced. On 9 December 2020, the inquiry published its interim report, entitled Never Again. The report "highlights the disparity in power between Indigenous peoples and industry in the protection of Indigenous heritage, and the serious failings of legislation designed to protect Indigenous heritage and promote Native Title". Seven recommendations were made, including urging the federal government to urgently review the Aboriginal and Torres Strait Islander Heritage Protection Act 1984.

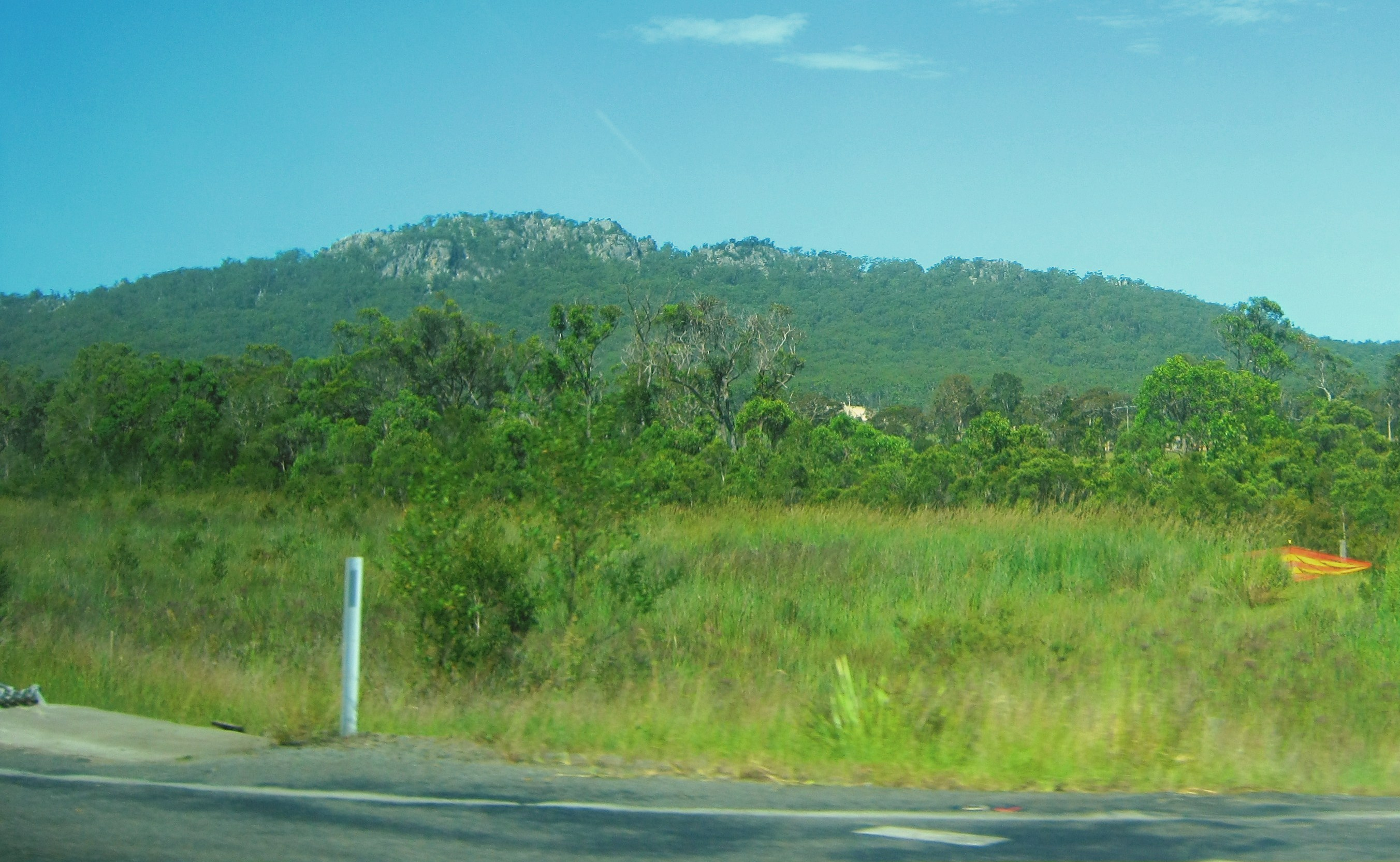
Alum Mountain. (Dates)

=== Other Significant cases ===
Dates v Minister for the Environment, Heritage and the Arts cases regarding the Alum or Bulahdelah Mountain, 2010.

Robert Tickner v Robert Bropho cases regarding the Swan Brewery, 1993.

== Reviews ==
=== The Evatt Review ===
Between October 1995 to June 1996, Elizabeth Evatt AC independently reviewed the Aboriginal and Torres Strait Islander Heritage Protection Act 1984. This review was requested after the Kumarangk (Hindmarsh Island) cases. The report produced 58 recommendations to amend the legislation which have continued to be used as suggested amendments to the Act decades later. The motivation for review was multi-factorial:

- Aboriginal People did not feel in control in administering the Act. There was no process to field or negotiate further questions on cultural heritage and no commitment to ensuring Aboriginal people had access to, or management of, the sites after declarations were made.
- The administration of the minerals industry became difficult to manage. Whilst no mining project had been stopped by the Act, industry authorities with approved projects under state legislation were delayed by commonwealth applications which led to financial strains.
- The application process was deemed ineffective due to "delays, litigation and cost for the applicants and other affected parties". The delays often resulted in the destruction and injury of areas and objects.
- The legislation was deemed ineffectual as few areas, from 1984 to January 1996, had protective declarations made. Between the allotted time frame, 4 out of 49 applications for requested declarations of protection were approved. Of those four, two were overturned by the High Court and one was revoked.
- The commonwealth Act was incongruent with states and territories legislation which led to complicated uses of the Act. However, ineffective state and territory legislation on Aboriginal heritage resulted in the Act providing the dominant form of heritage protection.
- States and territories struggled to negotiate with the commonwealth law due to a resistance to commonwealth intervention.
- The ministers’ decision was discretionary which concerned Indigenous applicants.
- In requiring the disclosure of information on the significance of the heritage site or item, cultural obligations were being breached. Indigenous customary law and practices of hierarchies of knowledge concerning age, gender and kinship connection includes restricted access to certain knowledge. Requiring applicants to disclose restricted information to claim significance meant Indigenous cultural obligations were disregarded.

Despite criticism, the review noted existing positive outcomes of the Act. The Act had instigated state, Indigenous and developer negotiations which at times produced protections without making declarations. The Act also intervened to modify or withdraw proposals, which resulted in developers consulting with Indigenous communities to discuss their respective interests.

The Evatt review was criticised for its time limitations regarding submissions and consultations. It was also criticised for not reviewing the Act in light of the Mabo decision.

The Evatt report's recommendations are summarised as follows:

- It was recommended that a cohesive national policy managed by a co-ordinating body should be created to reduce duplication and complication of state and federal laws. The policy would standardise the purposes, definitions and terms of heritage legislation. The co-ordinating body would be an adequately funded and fully resourced agency with a majority of its employees identifying as Indigenous.
- State, Territory and Commonwealth heritage protection laws should minimise or eradicate the requirement of Indigenous applicants to reveal restricted information.
- Provisions should be made to allow Indigenous peoples’ access to their respective sites and objects.
- Indigenous people, especially the recommended agency, should be the judges of the significance of a site or item, and deciders of the magnitude of the threat to areas and objects. The decision of significance and threat would be treated as separate from protection.
- Aboriginal cultural heritage concerns should be integrated into development and planning processes, ensuring Indigenous presence and negotiating powers in early stages of planning. The purpose would be to reach agreements, avoid disclosure of restricted information and avoid applications made under the Act as last resort and delaying mechanism.
- Decisions made by the recommended agency would be binding on the minister.
- The Acts’ processes would include a voluntarily elected mediator, during which time mediation is in process, the area or object would be under protection. If an agreement is met, it must be registered and breaches would give rise to civil liabilities.
- Thresholds for protections should be lowered, time frames of protection should be extended, and greater consultation on lifting declarations should be made.
- Emergency applications require immediate action.
- The Acts’ processes should require seeking consultation with interested parties and publicising the details of the process.
- Public records of heritage objects and repatriation processes should be produced.

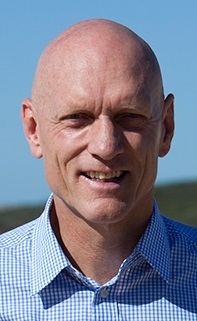
Peter Garrett, Minister for the Environment, Heritage and the Arts

=== 2009 Discussion Paper ===
In August 2009, the Federal Minister for the Environment, Heritage and the Arts, Peter Garrett proposed major reforms to the Act in discussion paper ‘Indigenous Heritage Law Reform’ because "The... Act has not proven to be an effective means of protecting traditional areas and objects". As stated in the paper, "93% of approximately 320 valid applications received since the Act commenced in 1984 have not resulted in declarations." There were concerns that these reforms limited protections but these amendments were not adopted.

The proposed amendments introduced new definitions, stating an object or area must have "a use or function" or "is the subject of a narrative" under traditional laws and customs, and "is protected or regulated under traditional laws and customs". Concerns were raised that protections would be limited if "there is a lack of physical evidence or because the area is of more contemporary significance."

The proposed changes also included a new system of accreditation for state or territory heritage protection laws. Where heritage protection laws in states and territories were deemed effective by the federal minister, the laws would become ‘accredited’. The effect would be applications be referred back to respective states or territories to be considered by their accredited legislation, and emergency declarations to the federal minister could not be made. This would minimise federal participation and ensure federal decisions would not override state or territory laws. It is noted that the "proposed changes [were] not designed to allow Aboriginal people to make final decisions regarding their cultural heritage. The final decision would be made by the relevant government department, agency or Minister."

The discussion paper also proposed that only "legally recognised traditional custodians" were able to make a declaration under the Act, where previously any Aboriginal or Torres Strait Islander person could. The discussion paper states, "Where there are no Indigenous people who clearly have a statutory responsibility for the land…any Indigenous person could apply for protection."

Another proposals introduced a new offence if "secret sacred objects" or "personal remains" were displayed publicly. The exception to this offence was if the display was permitted by Aboriginal and/or Torres Islander people accordance with laws and customs, or if the remains were "voluntarily donated under Commonwealth, state or territory laws or possibly if the object was imported into Australia for exhibition by a public museum or gallery".

== Amendments ==
From 1984, the Minister for Aboriginal and Torres Strait Islander Affairs was responsible for administering the Act and was "assisted by the Aboriginal and Torres Strait Islander Commission." However, independent of legislative amendments, from December 1998, the "responsibility was then transferred to the Minister for the Environment who administers the Act through Environment Australia."

=== The Aboriginal and Torres Strait Islander Heritage Protection Bill 1998 ===
In 1998 a bill of amendments was announced, as the Act had been overhauled after the Evatt Review, but failed to be introduced. The bill introduced requirements for applicants to prove that protection was in the ‘national interest’ and that applicants had exhausted all state or territory remedies. No Indigenous Heritage Advisory Board was instituted. This bill received mixed reviews. Requiring the exhaustion of state or territory remedies, where those legislative measures were deemed unsatisfactory, was believed to “waste valuable time and resources…risking the desecration of a significant area or object”.

The national interest test was considered too high a threshold for a last resort legislative measure and ‘national interest’ was not defined in the bill. Consensus on the bill and various amendments between the House of Representatives and the Senate could not be made. Two commonwealth parliamentary committees - the Parliamentary Joint Committee on Native Title and the Indigenous Land Fund and the Senate Legal and Constitutional (Legislation) Committee - were formed to decide on the validity of the Evatt Recommendations. Both committees suggested the bill introduce Evatt recommendations however government majority maintained minimal inclusion of recommendations. Evatt recommendations were not implemented.

=== Aboriginal and Torres Strait Islander Heritage Protection Amendment Act 2006 ===
==== Victorian Amendments ====
In 2006, amendments to the Act were made to remove the Victoria specific provisions. Since 1987, Victoria had state specific provisions within the Act that served as their heritage protection legislation which the Victorian government requested to repeal in 2005 as it limited the ability for the state to create Victorian specific heritage protection legislation. Senator Siewert was concerned that the state legislation would be insufficient, stating "I am concerned that handing over responsibility to Victoria effectively means that the Commonwealth is failing to meet its heritage obligations to the Indigenous peoples of Victoria." This concern arose out of believed "lack of appropriate and adequate consultation that was involved in the drafting of the Victorian legislation." In response to this amendment, Victoria produced the ‘Aboriginal Heritage Act 2006'. The effect of this amendment was the commonwealth Act having the same application across Australia.

==== Significant Object Amendments ====
After the Dja Dja Wurrung Bark Etchings Case, where 19th century bark etchings loaned to Museum Victoria from London were placed under emergency declarations under the Act, sections were added to the Act to stop declarations being made on objects that were under the Protection of Movable Cultural Heritage Act 1986,, like items owned by museums. This was added as overseas institutions, like museums, would be reluctant to loan material without the assurance of the objects return and this amendment would "help to secure the framework for future international cultural exchanges of benefit to Australia". This bill was passed, however concerns around the effectiveness of the Act were raised as "Indigenous communities would not consider the ability to view behind glass in a museum what they see as stolen items as any substitute for the loss of this heritage". Senator Siewart also stated "there is increasing international activity around the return of cultural artefacts…more must be done to pursue the return of these precious and sacred artefacts from overseas" and this amendment would reduce repatriation efforts.

== Examples of Declared Protected Areas ==
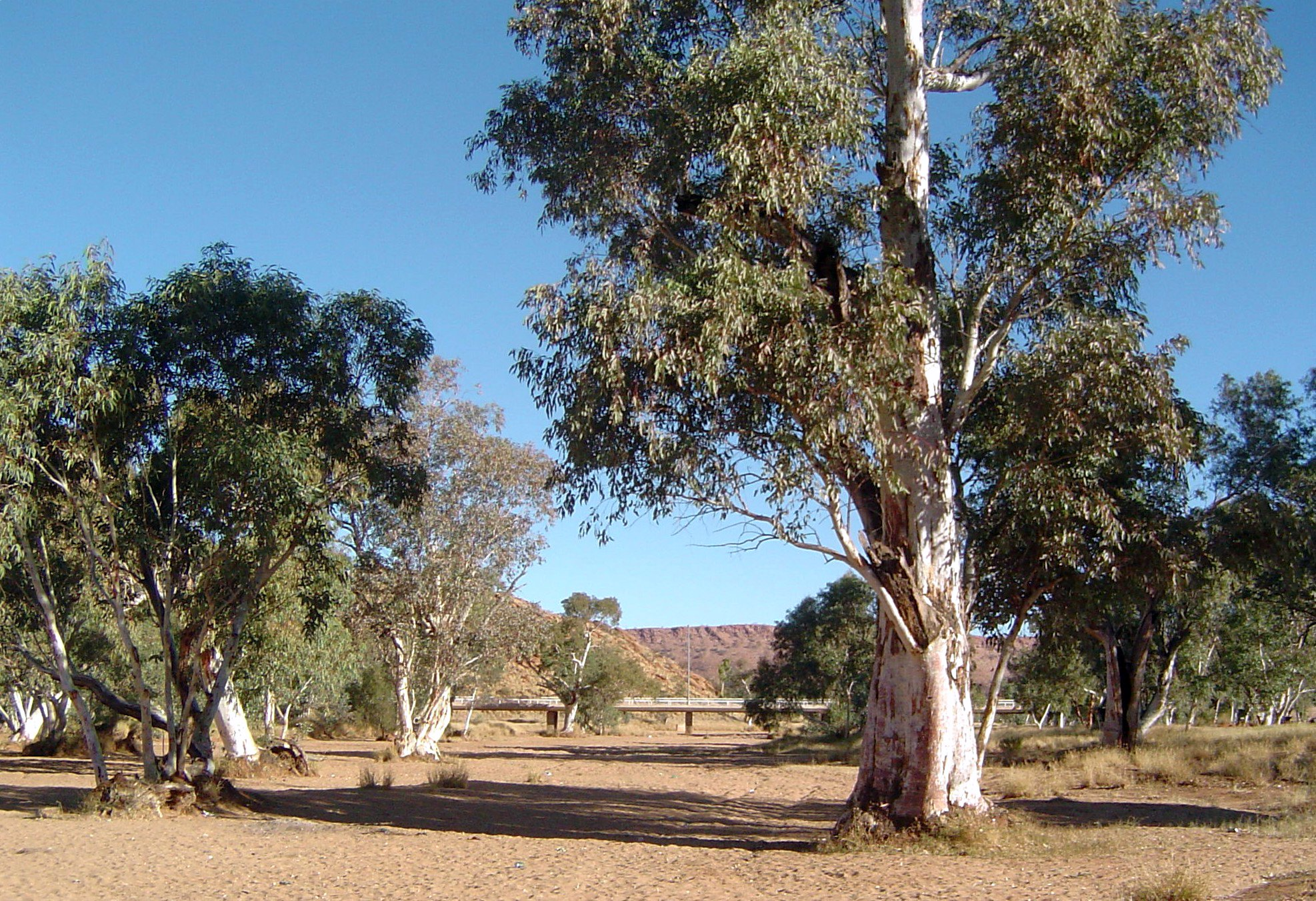
Todd River, which intersects with Junction Waterhole and where a dam was planned in the 1990s.

=== Junction Waterhole (Niltye/Tnyere-Akerte), Alice Springs ===
A declaration spanning 20 years was placed on Junction Waterhole in 1992. The declaration was contentious due to existing flooding concerns and town water supply. The declaration halted the damming of the Todd river which would have flooded sacred sites. The area is considered sacred as it is the site of "two Dreaming tracks which converge and interact in this area". These Dreaming tracks "traverses the continent from Port Augusta to the North Australian coast". This place was notable in the Act's history as it was the first site to receive a long-term declaration.

=== Boobera Lagoon, Moree, NSW. ===
Boobera Lagoon is protected under a permanent protection declaration as of 1 July 2000. The area, the lagoon and the land bordering it, is of great significance to Kamilaroi people and was at risk of environmental damage by power boats and water skiing. Earlier efforts to protect the site were its being catalogued by the National Parks and Wildlife Service in 1977, and two separate emergency declarations under the Act in 1992 and 1994. The declaration for protection was decided in 1998, after considering separate reports on the Lagoon.

The date of commencement of the declaration was two years after deciding the site was under threat of injury or desecration as "relevant State and Local Government agencies to establish an alternative water-skiing site". In May 2000 there was an attempt to postpone the commencement date by Senator Hill's review which stated "the lagoon has been extensively used for water skiing for 50 years... Water-skiing has become a significant family based activity in an area of regional Australia where there are few such opportunities However negative international attention regarding the lagoon meant the date of commencement remained 1 July 2001. The decision to delay and attempted postponement has been recorded as showing "loss for the Aboriginal community and the wider Australian community..[as] the interests of recreational users have been preferred to the human right of Indigenous people to have their culture protected" and "local Aboriginal people [were] prevented from fulfilling their role as custodians of the area" due to the delays.

== See also ==
- Aboriginal and Torres Strait Islander Commission (ATSIC)
- Australian Aboriginal customary law
- Australian Heritage Commission
- Australian Institute of Aboriginal and Torres Strait Islander Studies
- Declaration on the Rights of Indigenous Peoples
- Environment Protection and Biodiversity Conservation Act 1999
- Native title in Australia
- World Heritage Properties Conservation Act 1983
