= Bombah Point =

Coordinates: 32°30′22″S 152°18′04″E

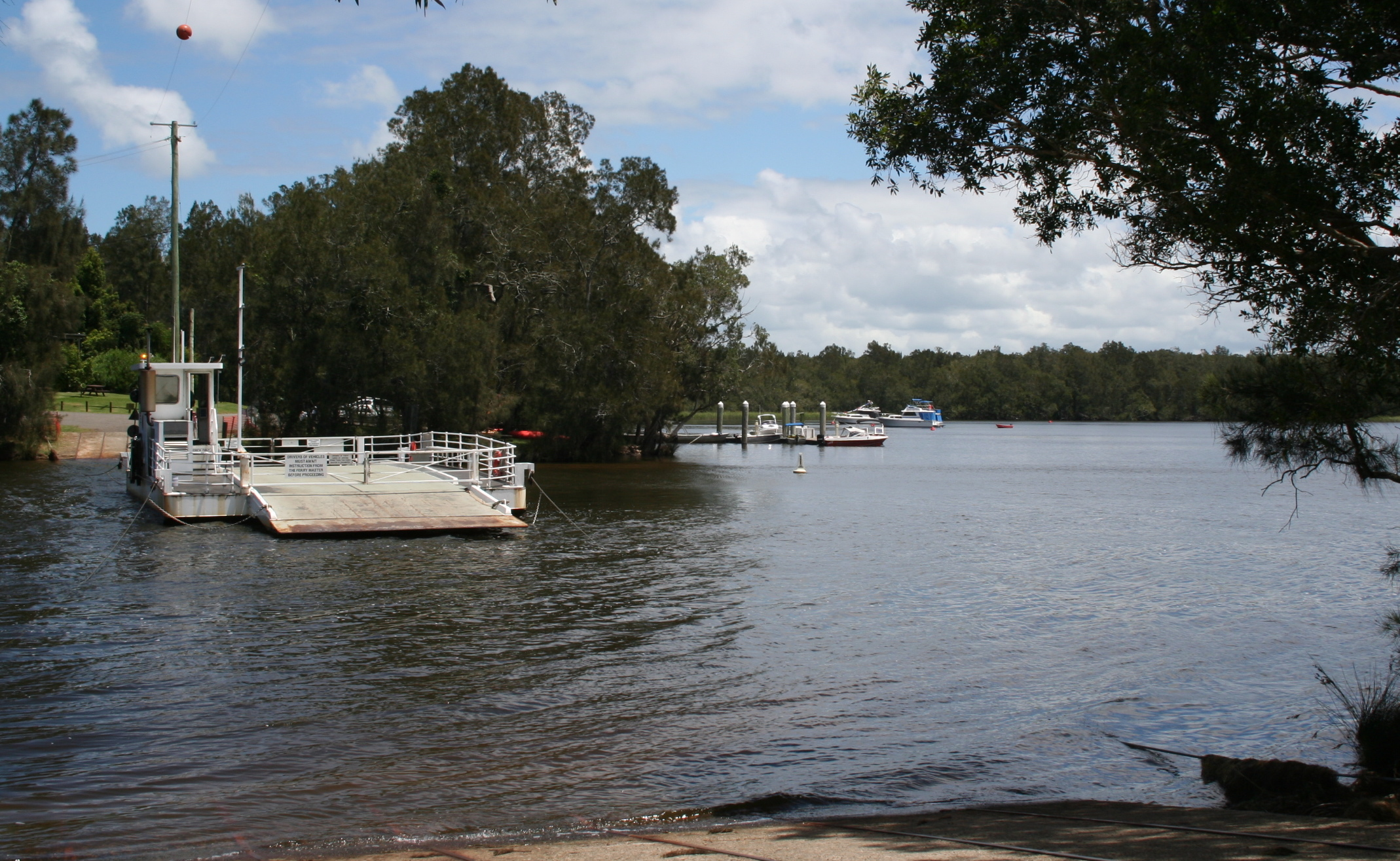
Bombah Point Ferry

Bombah Point is on the mid north coast of New South Wales, (Australia). Located at the centre of the Myall Lakes National Park which spans between Hawks Nest in the south and Seal Rocks in the north. Bombah Point is part of the coastal scenic route between Bulahdelah and Hawks Nest/Tea Gardens provides an alternative to the busy Pacific Highway, the historic car ferry at Bombah Point is the crossing point on the lake system.

Traditionally Aboriginal groups would use this, the narrowest crossing point on the 4 lake system, to move from summer hunting grounds in the hills towards Barrington Tops to winter grounds on the coast.

The area was a popular tourist destination for many years after Harry and Emily Legge set up a guest house and camping ground in 1909 which was run by the family until the 1970s when it was purchased by National Parks and Wildlife Service to be incorporated into the Park.

Today Bombah Point is popular with bushwalkers and holidaymakers and has two hotels.

The site is listed under the Ramsar Convention and prized for its abundant bird and wildlife.
