= Grevillea virgata =

Nerong grevillea

Scientific classification
- Kingdom: Plantae
- Clade: Tracheophytes
- Clade: Angiosperms
- Clade: Eudicots
- Order: Proteales
- Family: Proteaceae
- Genus: Grevillea
- Species: G. virgata

Binomial name
- Grevillea virgata Makinson

Species of shrub endemic to Australia

Grevillea virgata, commonly known as Nerong grevillea, is a species of flowering plant in the family Proteaceae. It is an upright shrub with white flowers and is endemic to the Central Coast of New South Wales.

== Description ==
Grevillea virgata is an upright, open shrub that grows to a height of 0.5–2 m (1 ft 8 in – 6 ft 7 in), with reddish branches when young and sometimes forms a rhizome. The leaves are narrowly elliptic, more or less spreading, usually separated in clusters of three, 1–3 mm (0.039–0.118 in) long, 1.5–3 mm (0.059–0.118 in) wide, upper surface sometimes marked with dots, prominent veins, smooth or with small, round protuberances. The lower surface is visible and covered with a few silky hairs.

The white flowers are borne at the end of branches, upright or curved downward in groups of 10 to 24. The perianth is white with occasional silky flattened hairs, densely on limbs, inside occasionally bearded. The gynoecium 7–8 mm (0.28–0.31 in) long, the style is white, turning pink after the perianth drops, mostly smooth, and hooked at the end 1–2 mm (0.039–0.079 in). Flowering occurs mostly from May to October and the fruit is a narrow ovoid shape 10–11 mm (0.39–0.43 in) long.

== Taxonomy and naming ==
Grevillea virgata was first formally described in 2000 by Robert Owen Makinson, and the description was published in the Flora of Australia. The specific epithet (virgata) means "long and slender".

== Distribution and habitat ==
Nerong grevillea grows in forest and on the edges of swamps near the lower Myall River, and occurs between Bulahdelah and Nerong in New South Wales.
