= Styphelia deformis =

Scientific classification
- Kingdom: Plantae
- Clade: Tracheophytes
- Clade: Angiosperms
- Clade: Eudicots
- Clade: Asterids
- Order: Ericales
- Family: Ericaceae
- Genus: Styphelia
- Species: S. deformis

Binomial name
- Styphelia deformis (R.Br.) Spreng.
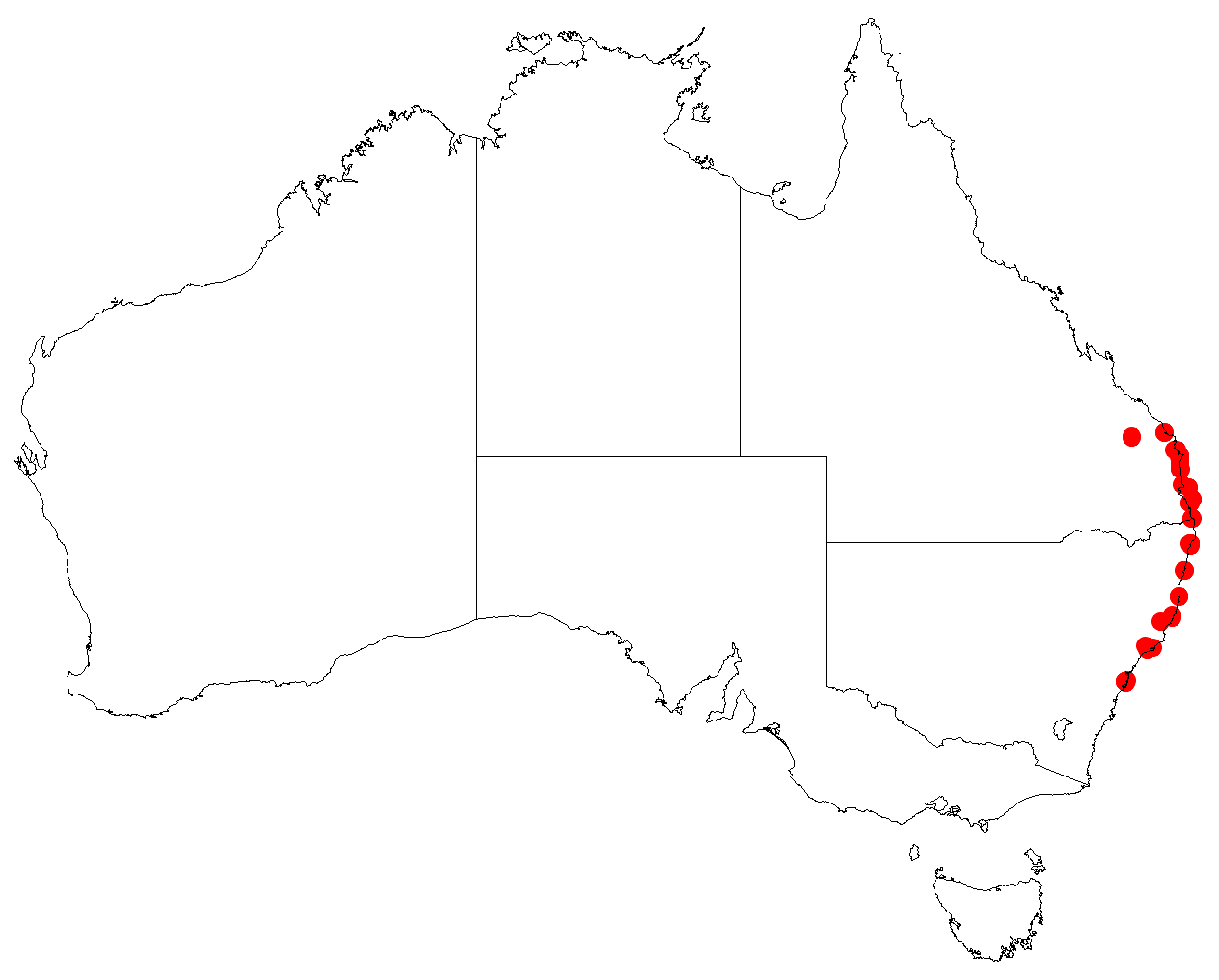
- Occurrence data from AVH

Synonyms
- Leucopogon deformis R.Br.

Species of plant

Styphelia deformis is a species of flowering plant in the heath family Ericaceae and is endemic to eastern coastal Australia. It is a bushy shrub with narrowly egg-shaped leaves, and white, tube-shaped flowers.

== Description ==
Styphelia deformis is a bushy shrub that typically grows to a height of less than 1 m (3 ft 3 in), its branchlets more or less glabrous. Its leaves are narrowly egg-shaped, 4.9–6.7 mm (0.19–0.26 in) long and 1.0–1.2 mm (0.039–0.047 in) wide on a petiole about 0.7 mm (0.028 in) long. The flowers are arranged on the ends of branches and in upper leaf axils and are sessile with bracteoles 1.3–1.7 mm (0.051–0.067 in) long. The sepals are 2.5–3.2 mm (0.098–0.126 in) long, the petals white and joined at the base to form a tube about 2 mm (0.079 in) long, the lobes 1.7–2.5 mm (0.067–0.098 in) long and softly-hairy inside. Flowering occurs from March to May and is followed by an oblong drupe 2.0–2.3 mm (0.079–0.091 in) long.

== Taxonomy and naming ==
This species was first formally described in 1810 by Robert Brown who gave it the name Leucopogon deformis in his Prodromus Florae Novae Hollandiae et Insulae Van Diemen. In 1824, Kurt Polycarp Joachim Sprengel transferred the species to the genus Styphelia as S. deformis in Systema Vegetabilium. The specific epithet (deformis) means "departing from the correct shape".

== Distribution and habitat ==
This species of styphelia grows in coastal heath from Hawks Nest in New South Wales to south-east Queensland.
