= Tops to Myall Heritage Trail =

Walking track in NSW, Australia

The Tops to Myall Heritage Trail is a 220 km walking track in the Hunter Region of New South Wales, Australia. The track starts on the sub-alpine plateau of the Barrington Tops National Park and gradually descends to the coast through the Myall Lakes National Park and ends at the seaside town of Tea Gardens.

== Walking ==
The track has 10 designated campsites and takes 11 days to walk. The suggested itinerary is as follows:

1. Lagoon Pinch to Wombat Creek, 10 km
2. To Munro Hut (private hut – donation requested), 20 km
3. To Mountaineer (camp), 24 km
4. To Log Dump (camp), 28 km
5. To Wards River (in Craven State Forest), 28 km
6. To Little River Campsite, 25 km
7. To Shorty's Camp, 25 km
8. To Korseman's Landing, 27 km
9. To Bombah Point, 7 km (mornings walk), shops
10. To Brambles Green, 16 km
11. To Hawks Nest Surf Club, 20 km
