= Crawford River =

Crawford River may refer to:

In Australia

- Crawford River (New South Wales), a river in New South Wales
- Crawford River (Victoria), a river in Victoria
