= Myall Lakes =

Lakes in New South Wales, Australia

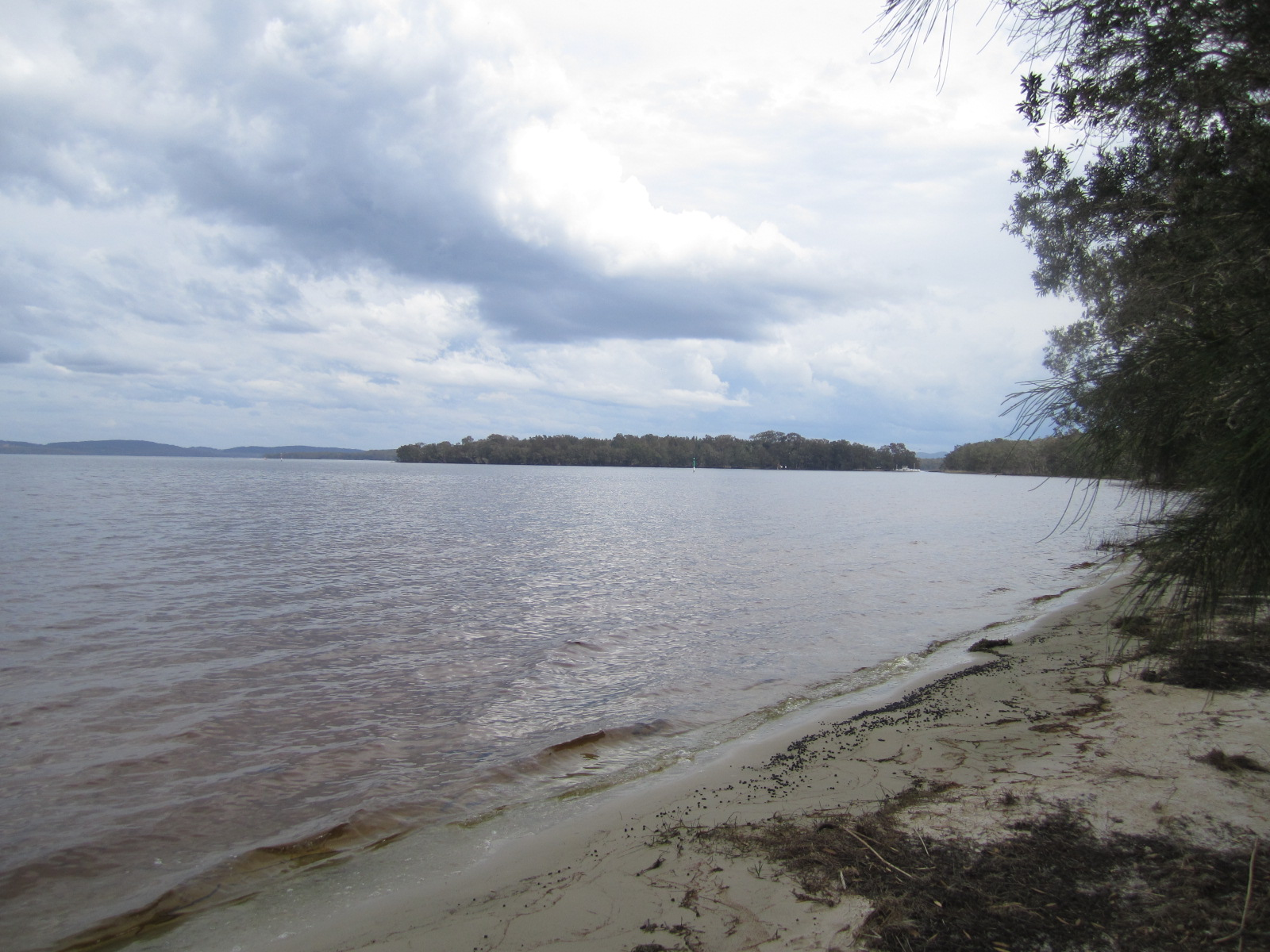
- One of the lakes in the Myall Lakes National Park.

- Location within New South Wales Location within Australia
- Location: Mid North Coast
- Coordinates: 32°27′27″S 152°21′43″E
- Primary inflows: Myall River
- Primary outflows: Myall River
- Basin countries: Australia
- Managing agency: NSW National Parks & Wildlife Service
- Designation: Ramsar-protected
- Surface area: 9,300 hectares (23,000 acres)
- Surface elevation: 0 m (0 ft)

Ramsar Wetland
- Designated: 14 June 1999
- Reference no.: 994

Myall Lakes, a series of fresh water lakes protected under the Ramsar Convention, are located within the Mid-Coast Council local government area in the Mid North Coast region of New South Wales, Australia.

The Myall Lakes are adjacent to the east coast, about 250 kilometres (155 mi) north of Sydney.

== Features and location ==
There are three Myall Lakes, called Myall Lake, Boolambayte Lake and The Broadwater.

When full, Myall Lake covers an area of around 5,800 hectares (14,000 acres); Boolambayte Lake covers an area of around 1,100 hectares (2,700 acres); and Bombah Broadwater covers an area of around 2,400 hectares (5,900 acres).

Smiths Lake is close to the northern Myall Lake, but is not connected nor formally part of the Myall Lakes. The lakes are partially interconnected and navigable by small craft. The Myall River flows into the western side of The Broadwater. The Myall River also flows out of The Broadwater and meanders southwest where it empties into Port Stephens between the towns of Tea Gardens and Hawks Nest. The lower Myall River progressively becomes saltier and more tidal as it flows southwards.

Most of the Myall Lakes are surrounded by the Myall Lakes National Park. The NSW National Parks & Wildlife Service operate a car ferry across the lake at Bombah Point. The area between the lakes and the sea is mainly uninhabited coastal woodlands and long isolated beaches although some of it was mined for heavy mineral sands before the 1970s. The village of Bungwahl is located on the northern shore of Myall Lake. There are a number of small islands in the lakes.

At the northern end of Myall Lake lies Mayers Point. This was the centre of a timber industry established by Allen Taylor and Company Limited. To assist in the transport of the logs from the forests to the lake, an extensive light railway system was constructed.

Due to the nature of Myall Lakes being coastal dune lakes, or coastal lagoons, they were featured in an American documentary about conservation done by producer Elam Stoltzfus.

== See also ==
- List of lakes of Australia
