= Bulahdelah Mountain =

Mountain in New South Wales, Australia

- Alum Mountain
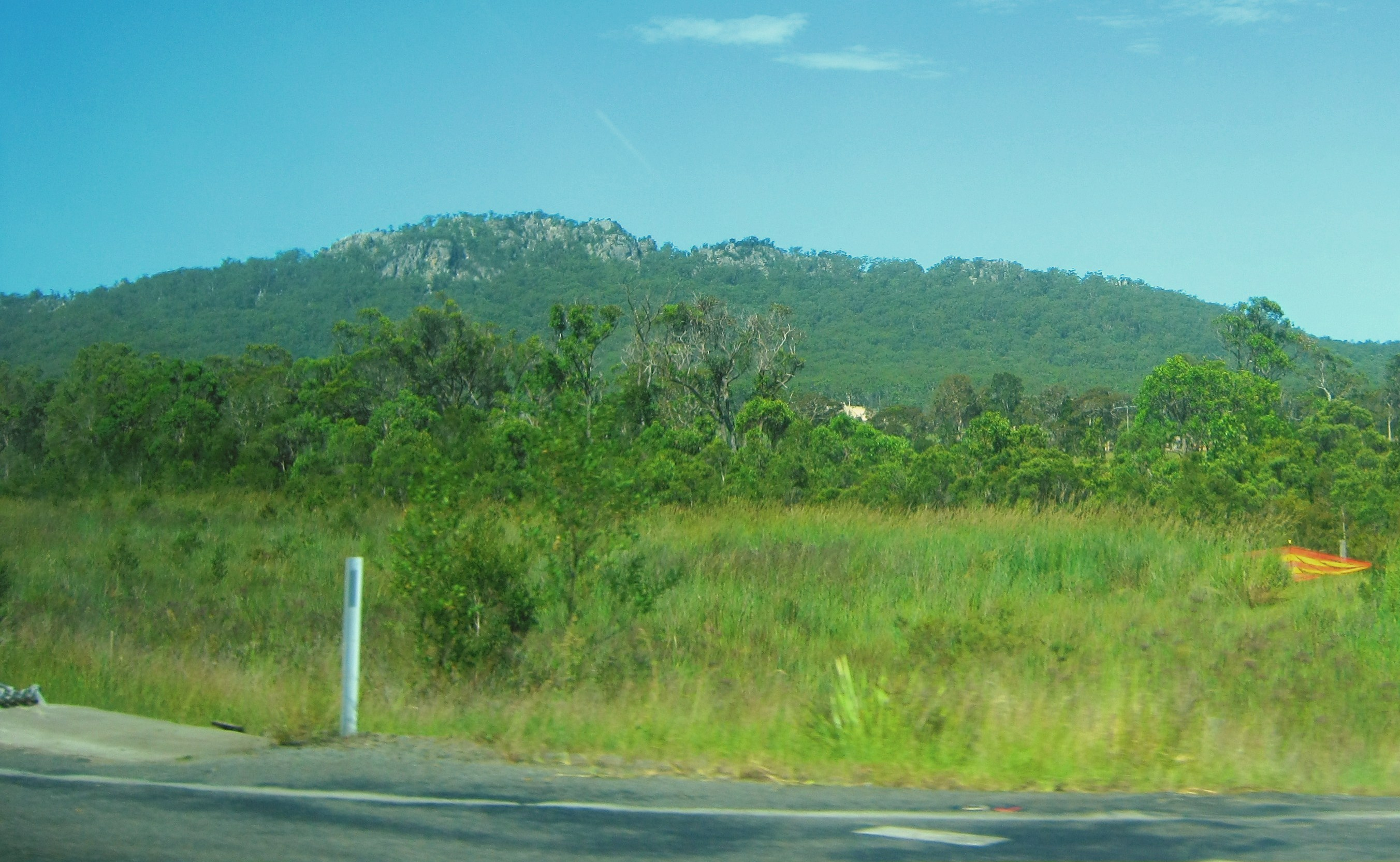
- The mountain as seen from the Pacific Highway

Highest point
- Coordinates: 32°25′S 152°13′E

Geography
- Location within New South Wales
- Location: Hunter Region of New South Wales, Australia

Bulahdelah Mountain, or Alum Mountain, as it is also known, is a set of rocky tors that overlook the township of Bulahdelah and the Myall River Valley. A wide range of animals and plants can be seen amid the picturesque boulders, including a spectacular range of orchids. The mountain has been set aside as a forest park by the State Forests of New South Wales for its historical, recreational and natural significance.

== See also ==
- List of mountains of Australia § New South Wales
