= Myall River =

River in New South Wales, Australia

Coordinates: 32°14′S 152°10′E

Myall River Upper Myall River
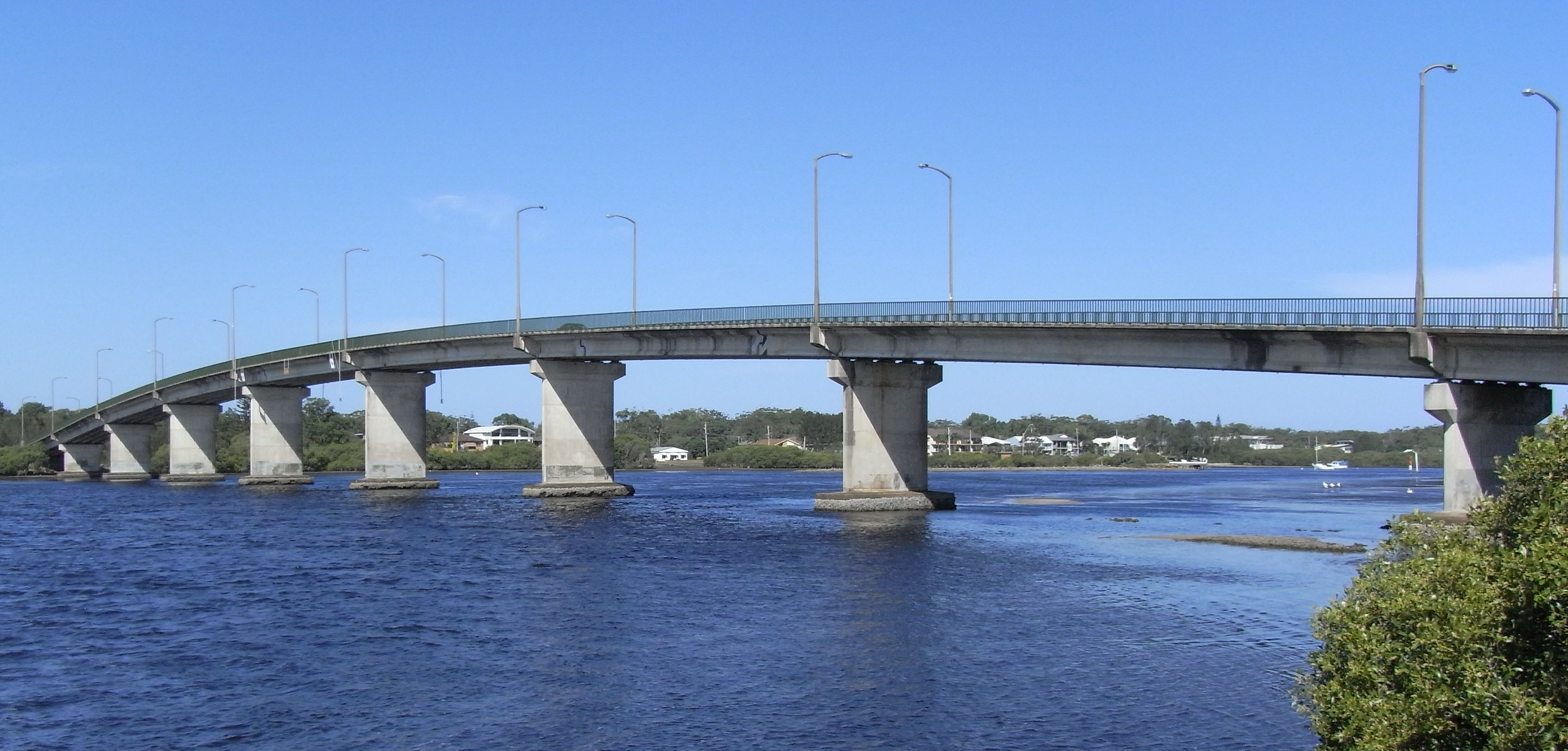
- Singing Bridge across the Myall River at Tea Gardens/Hawks Nest.
- Etymology: Aboriginal: myall, a small silver-grey wattle tree

Location
- Country: Australia
- State: New South Wales
- Region: NSW North Coast (IBRA), Mid North Coast, Hunter
- Local government area: Mid-Coast Council
- Town: Bulahdelah, Tea Gardens, Hawks Nest

Physical characteristics
- Source: Kyle Range, Great Dividing Range
  - location: north northeast of Stroud
  - elevation: 352 m (1,155 ft)
- Mouth: Port Stephens
  - location: at Hawks Nest
  - elevation: 0 m (0 ft)
- Length: 92 km (57 mi)
- Basin size: 819 km^{2} (316 sq mi)

Basin features
- River system: Mid-Coast Council
- Tributaries
  - left: Kyle Creek, Pipers Creek (Great Lakes, New South Wales)
  - right: Crawford River, Little Myall River, Monkey Jacket Creek
- National park: Myall Lakes NP

Myall River, an open semi-mature brackish freshwater barrier estuary of the Mid-Coast Council system, is located in the Mid North Coast region of New South Wales, Australia.

== Course and features ==
Myall River rises out of the southern slopes of Kyle Range within the Great Dividing Range, north northeast of Stroud, and flows generally south southeast then southwest, joined by tributaries, before reaching its mouth within Port Stephens at Hawks Nest. Port Stephens then empties into the Tasman Sea of the South Pacific Ocean. The river descends 355 metres (1,165 ft) over its 92 kilometres (57 mi) course.

After flowing past the town of Bulahdelah, east of the small settlement of Nerong, the Myall River enters the most southern of the three Ramsar-protected Myall Lakes, Bombah Broadwater, within the Myall Lakes National Park. The flow of the river runs adjacent to the coastline and through both the Little Brasswater and the Brasswater near the towns of Tea Gardens, and Hawks Nest.

Two notable bridges cross the Myall River. The Bulahdelah Bridge, carries the Pacific Highway, across the river north of Bulahdelah and the Singing Bridge crosses the river between Tea Gardens and Hawks Nest..

== Etymology ==
The word myall is an Australian Aboriginal term for a small silver-grey wattle tree.

== See also ==
- Rivers of New South Wales
- List of rivers of New South Wales (L–Z)
- List of rivers of Australia
