= Angels Beach =

Surfing beach on the Pacific coast of New South Wales

Coordinates: 28.8533°S 153.6016°E

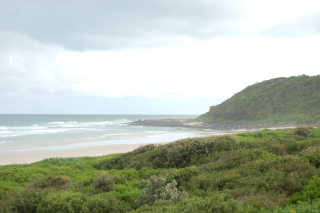
Angels Beach - bushland and view to southern end from popular picnic spot.

Angels Beach is a surfing beach on the Pacific Ocean on the north coast of New South Wales, Australia.

Located in East Ballina, of the town Ballina, New South Wales, the beach offers a natural area for activities such as surfing, dog-walking, bushwalking, swimming, and other recreational activities to locals and tourists alike.

The beach is headed off by rocks near Black Head on the southern end (pictured) and spreads to its northern limit at Flat Rock, a popular fishing zone.

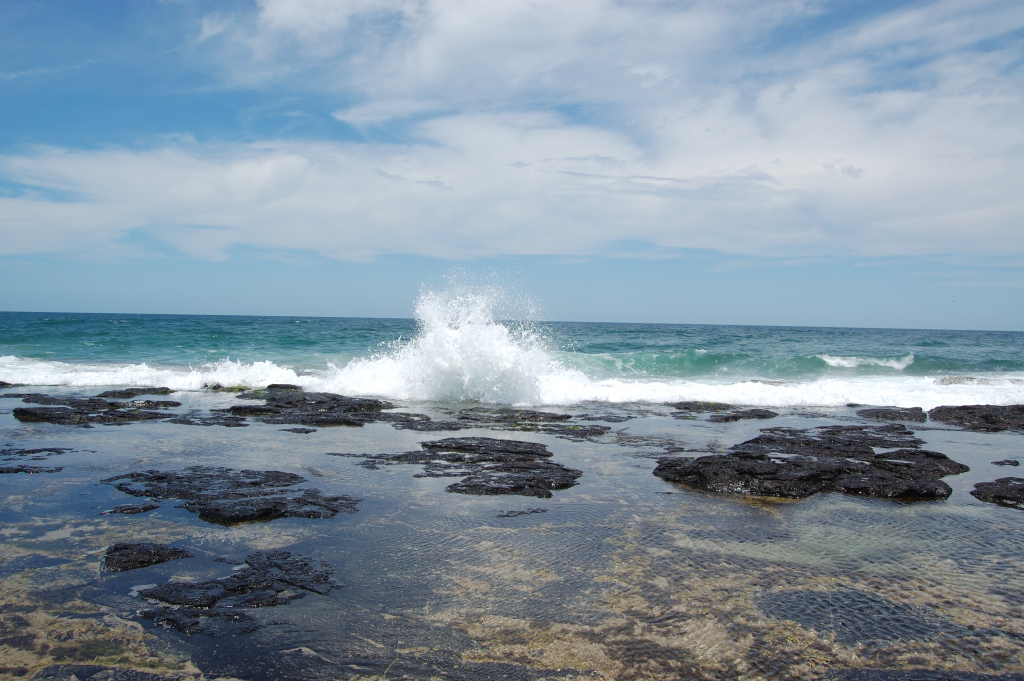
Flat Rock, Angels Beach north

The Black Head lookout holds particular significance to the Bundjalung People. Flat Rock (pictured) is a place for unique examination of marine wildlife and is a focal point for northern stretches towards Lennox Head, including Sharps Beach.

== Geography and location ==
The beach is approximately 200 km south of Queensland capital city Brisbane, and 750 km north of New South Wales capital city Sydney. The zone itself covers approximately 68 hectares.
