= Tea Gardens, New South Wales =

Tea Gardens New South Wales
- Coordinates: 32°40′01″S 152°09′34″E
- Population: 3,288 (2021 census)
- Postcode(s): 2324
- Elevation: 6 m (20 ft)
- Time zone: AEST (UTC+10)
  - Summer (DST): AEDT (UTC+11)
- Location: 216 km (134 mi) NNE of Sydney; 77 km (48 mi) NE of Newcastle; 39 km (24 mi) S of Bulahdelah; 107 km (66 mi) SSW of Forster–Tuncurry
- LGA(s): MidCoast Council
- Region: Mid North Coast
- County: Gloucester
- Parish: Viney Creek/Coweambah
- State electorate(s): Port Stephens
- Federal division(s): Lyne
Mean max temp	Mean min temp	Annual rainfall
27.3 °C; 81 °F	8.4 °C; 47 °F	1,348.9 mm 53.1 in
Localities around Tea Gardens:
Nerong	Nerong	Nerong, Hawks Nest
Nerong, North Arm Cove	Tea Gardens	Hawks Nest
Pindimar	Port Stephens	Hawks Nest

Tea Gardens is a locality in the Mid-Coast Council local government area, in Mid North Coast region of New South Wales, Australia.

At the 2021 census Tea Gardens had a population of 3,288, with most of the population resident in the town of Tea Gardens at the southern end of the locality.

== Geography ==
Tea Gardens extends along the west bank of the Myall River from Port Stephens about 14 kilometres (8.7 mi) in a north-north-easterly direction. In the west it reaches the Pacific Highway. The town of Tea Gardens is located at the southernmost end of the locality, on the northern shore of Port Stephens on the west bank of the Myall River, which connects the Myall Lakes to the port. It is located directly across the river from Hawks Nest and the two lane Singing Bridge connects the two. Tea Gardens is located almost 220 km (137 mi) north of Sydney, about 10 km (6.2 mi) southeast of the Pacific Highway on the southern end of the Ramsar Convention listed wetlands of the Myall Lakes.

== Demographics ==
According to the 2021 census the population of Tea Gardens is 3,288, an increase from 2,434 in 2011. The median age in Tea Gardens is 69, significantly higher than the national average of 38. Tea Gardens has one of the oldest populations in Australia. This is also an increase from 61 in 2011. 13.5% of residents are aged 65–69; this compares with the national figure of 5.1%. 3.6% of residents are Aboriginal or Torres Strait Islander; the median age among this group is 39.

75.7% of residents report being born in Australia; higher than the national average of 66.7%. Other than Australia the top countries are England (6.6%); New Zealand (1.7%), and Scotland (0.9%). The most common reported ancestries in Tea Gardens are English, Australian and Irish. 64.2% of residents report both parents being born in Australia, higher than the national average of 45.9%.

The major religious groups in Tea Gardens are Anglican 32.1%, Catholic 20.2% and Uniting Church 5.1%. 24.5% reported no religion with 7.9% not answering the question.

The unemployment rate in Tea Gardens is 4.9% as at the 2021 census, which is similar to the national average of 5.1%.
