= Crawford River (New South Wales) =

Crawford
- Location of the Crawford River mouth in New South Wales

Location
- Country: Australia
- State: New South Wales
- Region: NSW North Coast (IBRA), Mid North Coast
- LGA: Mid-Coast Council
- Town: Bulahdelah

Physical characteristics
- Source: Winns Mountain
  - location: northeast of Stroud
  - coordinates: 32°24′39″S 152°2′39″E
  - elevation: 175 m (574 ft)
- Mouth: confluence with the Myall River
  - location: at Bulahdelah
  - coordinates: 32°24′48″S 152°12′7″E
  - elevation: 3 m (9.8 ft)
- Length: 25 km (16 mi)

Basin features
- River system: Mid-Coast Council catchment

The Crawford River, a perennial river of the Mid-Coast Council system, is located in the Mid North Coast region of New South Wales, Australia.

== Course and features ==
The Crawford River rises below Winns Mountain, northeast of Stroud, and flows generally east, southeast, then northeast through Myall River State Forest, before reaching its confluence with the Myall River at Bulahdelah, descending 173 metres (568 ft) over its 25-kilometre (16 mi) course.

== See also ==
- Rivers of New South Wales
- List of rivers of New South Wales (A–K)
- List of rivers of Australia
