= Hawks Nest, New South Wales =

Hawks Nest New South Wales
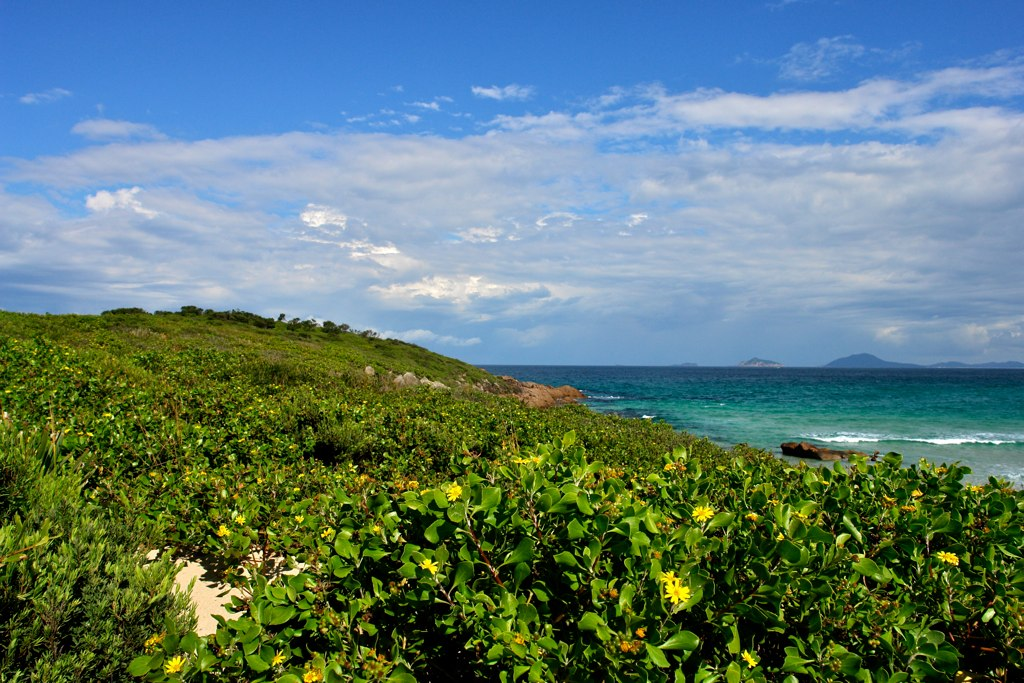
- The end of the Hawks Nest peninsula

- Coordinates: 32°40′S 152°11′E
- Population: 1,223 (2016 census)
  - Density: 32.7/km^{2} (85/sq mi) ^{Note1}
- Postcode(s): 2324
- Elevation: 10 m (33 ft)^{Note2}
- Area: 31.4 km^{2} (12.1 sq mi)^{Note3}
- Time zone: AEST (UTC+10)
  - Summer (DST): AEDT (UTC+11)
- Location: 218 km (135 mi) NNE of Sydney; 79 km (49 mi) NE of Newcastle; 109 km (68 mi) SSW of Forster; 42 km (26 mi) S of Bulahdelah; 2 km (1 mi) ENE of Tea Gardens
- LGA(s): Mid-Coast Council
- Region: Hunter, Mid North Coast
- County: Gloucester
- Parish: Fens
- State electorate(s): Port Stephens
- Federal division(s): Lyne
Mean max temp	Mean min temp	Annual rainfall
27.3 °C; 81 °F	8.4 °C; 47 °F	1,348.9 mm 53.1 in
Localities around Hawks Nest:
Nerong, Tea Gardens	Nerong	Mungo Brush,
Tea Gardens	Hawks Nest	Tasman Sea
Port Stephens	Port Stephens	Tasman Sea

Hawks Nest is a small town of the Mid-Coast Council local government area in the Hunter and Mid North Coast regions of New South Wales, Australia, located north of Port Stephens between the Tasman Sea and the Myall River. It was named after a large hawk's nest in a tree on the Myall River that was used as a navigational aid. The traditional custodians of this land are the Worimi people.

== History ==
The first Europeans to work in the area were timber getters who took an interest in the cedar forests along the Myall River early in the 19th century.

Hawks Nest emerged as a service centre for the local fishing and timber industries in the 1950s. Today it remains a popular holiday destination.

== Geography ==
Hawks Nest is a long (16.5 kilometres (10.3 mi)), thin (typically 1.7 km (1.1 mi)), coastal town running northeast to southwest and is about 220 km (137 mi) north of Sydney, 12 km (7.5 mi)) from the Pacific Highway. It is bordered by the Tasman Sea to the east, the Myall River to the west and Port Stephens to the south. It includes Yacaaba, the northern headland of Port Stephens, which rises to 210 metres (690 ft) above mean sea level. However, the rest of the town is generally low, flat, sandy and covered in coastal scrubland, with some bushland, resulting in the northern part of the suburb being accessible only by four-wheel drive vehicles until the 1980s.

Hawks Nest is located directly across the river from Tea Gardens and was connected by the Singing Bridge in 1974. Before this the river crossing was made by a small car ferry. Most (approximately 95%) of the suburb is still uninhabited with the population concentrated around the Hawks Nest township, on the Myall River and Winda Woppa on Port Stephens.

== Demographics ==
At the 2016 census there were 1,223 people in Hawks Nest. 79.9% of people were born in Australia and 89.4% of people spoke only English at home. The most common responses for religion were Anglican 30.0%, No Religion 25.9% and Catholic 20.8%.

While nearby Tea Gardens is primarily a residential and commercial area, Hawks Nest tends to be dominated by holiday rentals and caravan parks which causes the population to vary considerably with the influx of tourists.

== Tourism ==
Jimmys Beach and the Tasman Sea on the east (Bennetts Beach or The Main Beach, as it is commonly referred to) are popular resorts. The Myall Lakes are a short drive north. Hawks Nest has many shops and cafes catering to the tourist trade and, with its sandy beaches and bush walks, proximity to Sydney, and much greater seclusion than suburbs on the southern shores of Port Stephens, it is a popular weekend getaway for Sydneysiders. Hawks Nest was well known as the location of holiday retreats belonging to then Prime Minister John Howard until, in 1998, he decided to abandon his family's regular holiday spot of twenty years due to alleged media harassment. John Howard has returned to Hawks Nest after leaving politics in 2007.

The local golf course was formally opened on 12 August 1978. It was designed in 1968 by Matt Lauder, a professional golfer and nephew of Scottish comedian, Sir Harry Lauder.

Holiday activities in the area include swimming, snorkeling and diving, golfing, bush walking, dolphin and whale spotting, four-wheel driving, caravanning and fishing.

Animals such as koalas, dingoes and dolphins can be observed in the area.

== Notes ==
1. The density figure presented is that of the entire suburb. The population density in the inhabited portion is approximately 685/km^{2} (1,770/sq mi).
2. Average elevation of the suburb as shown on 1:100000 map 9332 PORT STEPHENS.
3. Area calculation is based on 1:100000 map 9332 PORT STEPHENS.
