= Bulahdelah, New South Wales =

Bulahdelah
- Town
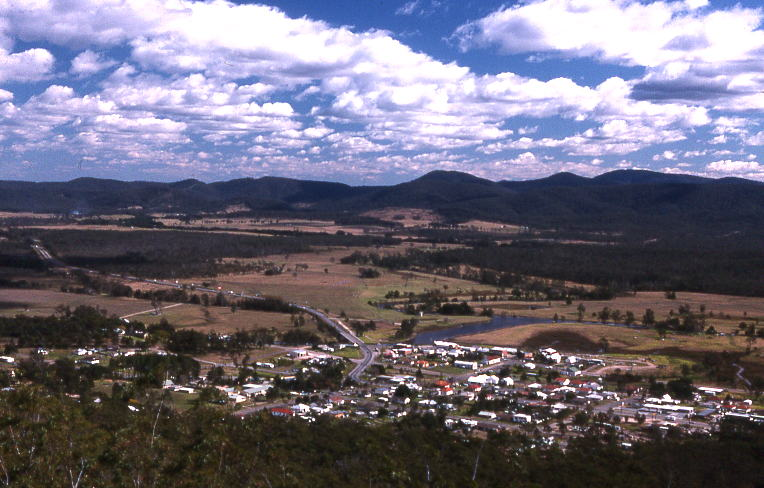
- Bulahdelah seen from nearby hills

- Coordinates: 32°22′59″S 152°11′43″E
- Country: Australia
- State: New South Wales
- Region: Mid North Coast
- LGA: Mid-Coast Council
- Location: 235 km (146 mi) NNE of Sydney; 93 km (58 mi) NE of Newcastle; 671 km (417 mi) S of Brisbane; 75 km (47 mi) SSW of Taree; 65 km (40 mi) SW of Forster

Government
  - State electorate: Myall Lakes
  - Federal division: Lyne

Area
  - Total: 270.6 km^{2} (104.5 sq mi)
- Elevation: 13 m (43 ft)

Population
  - Total: 1,163 (UCL 2021)
  - Density: 5.6/km^{2} (15/sq mi)
- Time zone: UTC+10 (AEST)
  - Summer (DST): UTC+11 (AEDT)
- Postcode: 2423
- County: Gloucester
- Parish: Willabah
Localities around Bulahdelah
Markwell	Markwell	Wootton
Crawford River	Bulahdelah	Boolambayte
Crawford River	Nerong	Bombah Point

Bulahdelah (/bʊləˈdiːlə/) is a town and locality in the Mid North Coast region of New South Wales, Australia in the Mid-Coast Council local government area.

== Geography ==
The town is situated 235 kilometres (146 mi) north of Sydney along the eastern and northern banks of the Myall River, approximately 480 metres (1,575 ft) east of the confluence of the Myall and Crawford rivers. The eastern sector of the township is built on the foot of the Alum Mountain. Leading into the town from the south is the Bulahdelah Bridge that opened in November 1969 which formed part of the Pacific Highway until the town was bypassed in 2013.

== History ==
The name Bulahdelah ("Boolah Dillah", meaning the Great Rock), is the local Worimi Aboriginal people’s name for the 292-metre-high (958 ft) mountain, on which the south-eastern sector of the township is built. The official name of the mountain is Bulahdelah Mountain, since 1818 when crown surveyor John Oxley added the word Mountain, but it is commonly known as "the Alum Mountain".

Alunite was discovered on the mountain and mined from 1878 to 1927, managed by the Department of Mining from 1897. A refinery, "The Alum Works", was built to extract alum from the alunite. The mine was operated again, from 1934 to 1952. Due to decreasing profitability, mining ceased by 1952 and, in 1979, NSW State Forests took over management of the mountain.

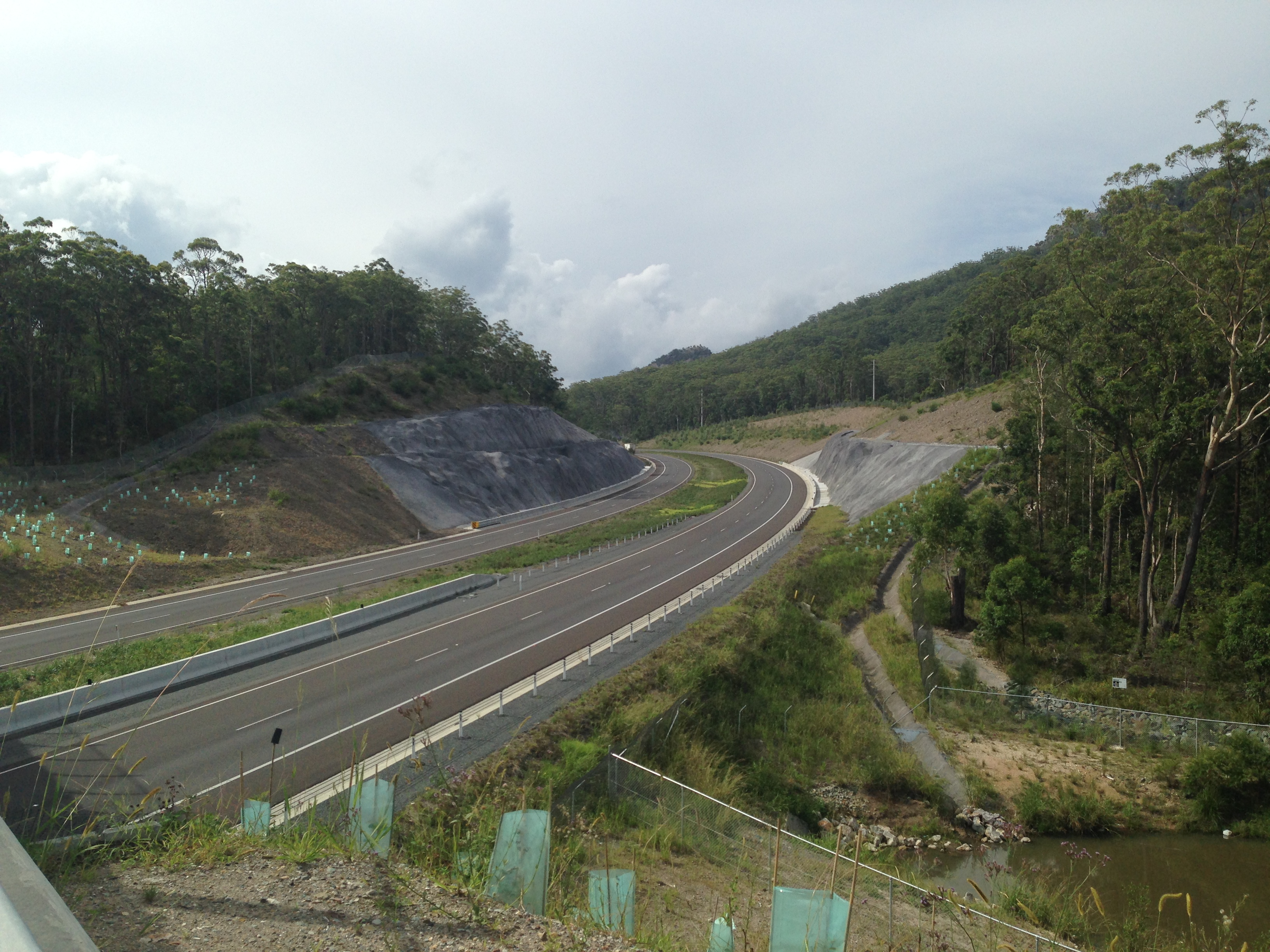
Bulahdelah Bypass

Construction of the timber bridge across the Myall River was completed in 1892 and the bridge was formally opened on 28 July 1892. A 2-lane concrete bridge over the Myall River was completed in 1969.

In 1970, the Bulahdelah tornado swept through the nearby forests, just north of Bulahdelah in what was Australia's most destructive tornado on record.

In July 2013 a new section of the Pacific Highway bypassed Buladelah.

== Population ==
In the 2016 Census, there were 1,424 people in Bulahdelah. 83.8% of people were born in Australia and 91.2% of people spoke only English at home. The most common responses for religion were Anglican 30.3%, Catholic 23.3% and No Religion 21.9%.

== Places of interest ==
=== The Alum Mountain ===
Overlooking the town of Bulahdelah, the Alum Mountain provides views of the area from Cabbage Tree Mountain to the coastline. A lookout is accessible via walking trails and car access extends about two thirds of the way up. Abandoned mining equipment from the mining operations up until 1952 is found in parts of the mountain as are blast caves. A disused mining cart trail directly up the mountain (known by the locals as "the trolley track") is part of the heritage mine-site complex.

=== Cabbage Tree Mountain ===
An area of State forest, open to tourists for camping and hiking this bushland set of ranges is visible from the town of Bulahdelah and Alum Mountain.

=== Tops to Myall Heritage Trail ===
The Tops to Myall Heritage Trail passes through the area surrounding Bulahdelah.

== Logging industry ==
Logging was a traditional industry of Bulahdelah until 1994 when much of the Forestry Commission land was dedicated to National Parks. It still contributed significantly to the economy of Bulahdelah in the early 2000s.
