= Myall Lakes National Park =

Protected area in New South Wales, Australia

- IUCN category II (national park)
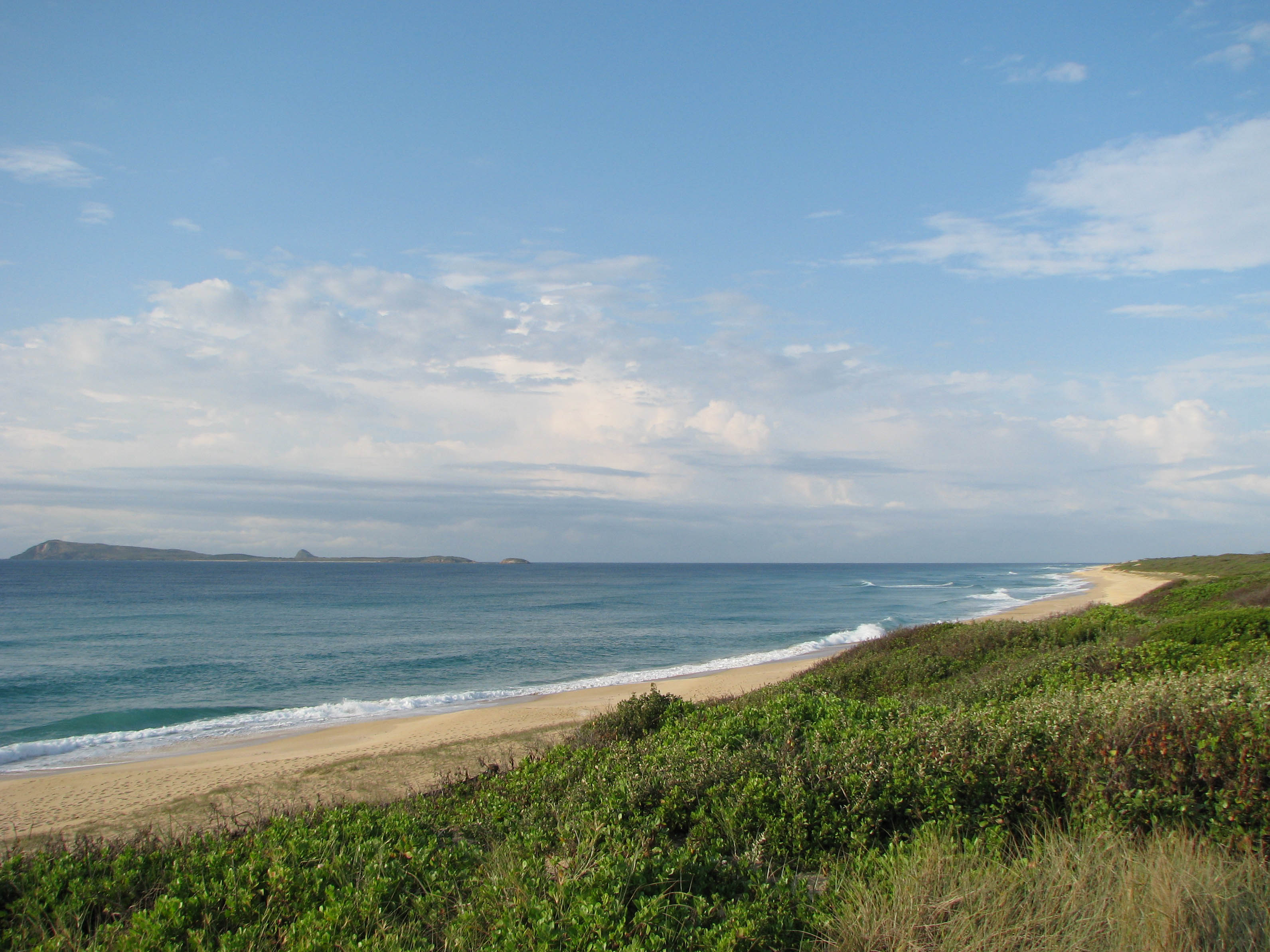
- Beach at Myall Lakes National Park, NSW

- Location within New South Wales
- Location: New South Wales
- Coordinates: 32°29′41″S 152°20′11″E
- Area: 448 km^{2} (173 sq mi)
- Established: 1972
- Governing body: National Parks and Wildlife Service (New South Wales)
- Website: Official website

Myall Lakes National Park is a national park located in New South Wales, Australia, 236 kilometres (147 mi) north of Sydney. It encompasses one of the state's largest coastal lake systems Myall Lakes, and includes Broughton Island. The park includes 40 kilometres of beaches and rolling sand dunes. Myall Lakes is also one of the most visited parks in New South Wales.

== History ==
The Worimi Aboriginal people had inhabited the Myall Lakes National Park land area for its abundance of natural resources. These natural resources had offered a traditional hunter-gatherer lifestyle for the Worimi people. The park includes important spiritual sites that are an important part of the identity of local Aboriginal people. Dark Point Aboriginal Place served as a location for the Worimi people to gather together for ceremonies and feasts and has been of significance to Worimi people for at least 4000 years.

== Environment ==
Myall Lakes National Park incorporates a patchwork of freshwater lakes, the ocean, islands, native flora, dense littoral rainforest and beaches.

Since 1999, Myall Lakes has been listed under the Ramsar Convention.

=== Fauna ===
The lakes support a large variety of birds including bowerbirds, white-bellied sea eagle and tawny frogmouths.

Other native Fauna which can be seen in the park includes the nocturnal long-nosed bandicoot which has grey-brown fur and a pointed snout for which it uses to forage for worms and insects. The Striped marsh frog can be found near ponds and swamps and has a distinct sound which can be heard all year round. The Eastern swamp crayfish was first discovered here.

== Climate ==
The average high temperature during the summer season averages between 19 °C and 27 °C. The highest temperature recorded at the park is 41.5 °C. The average temperature during the winter season averages between 10 °C and 19 °C with the lowest temperature on record being 1.1 °C. The wettest month typically occurs in May while the driest month occurs in November. The area's highest recorded rainfall in one day is 257.8mm.

== Gallery ==
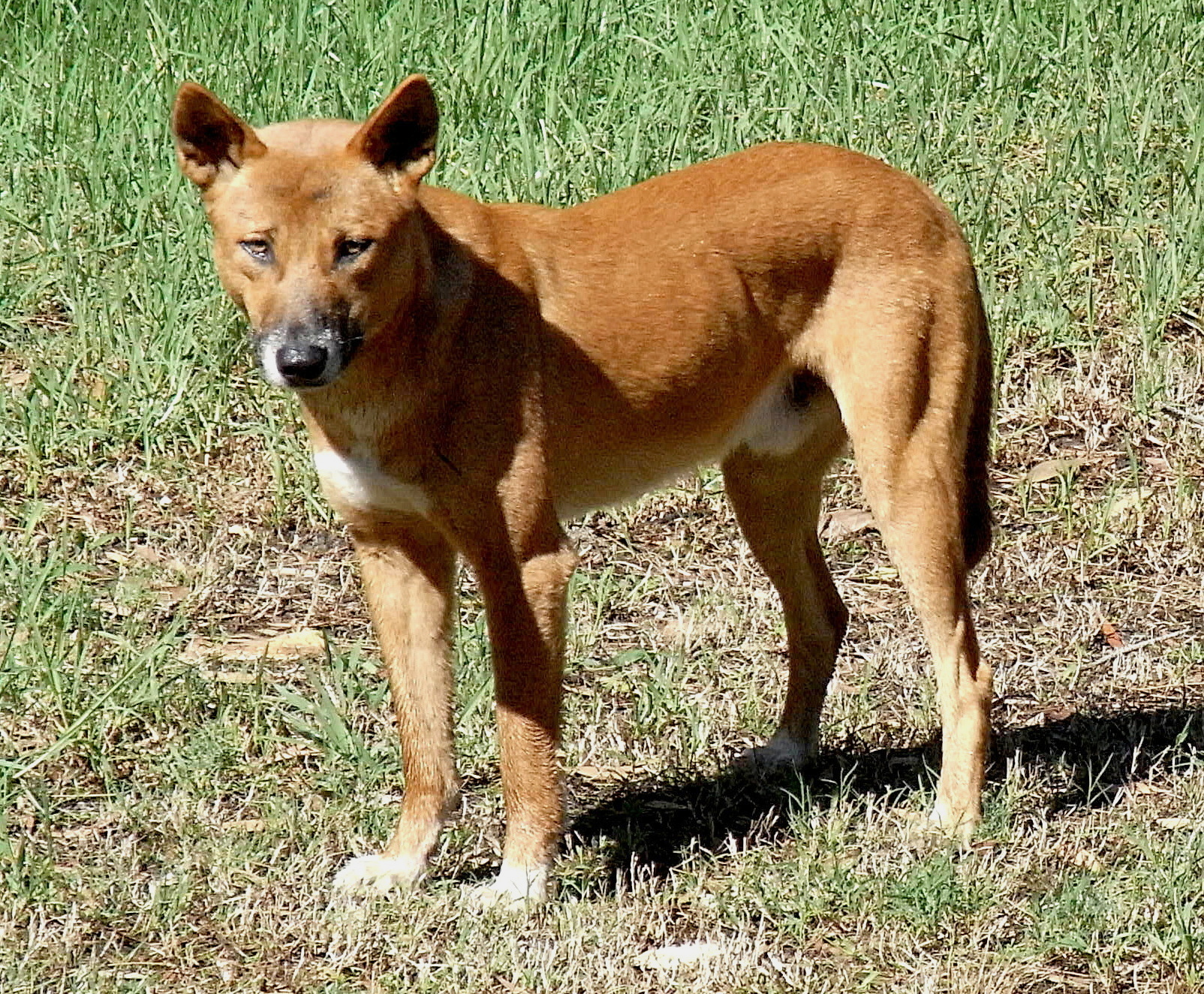
Dingo at Myall Lakes National Park

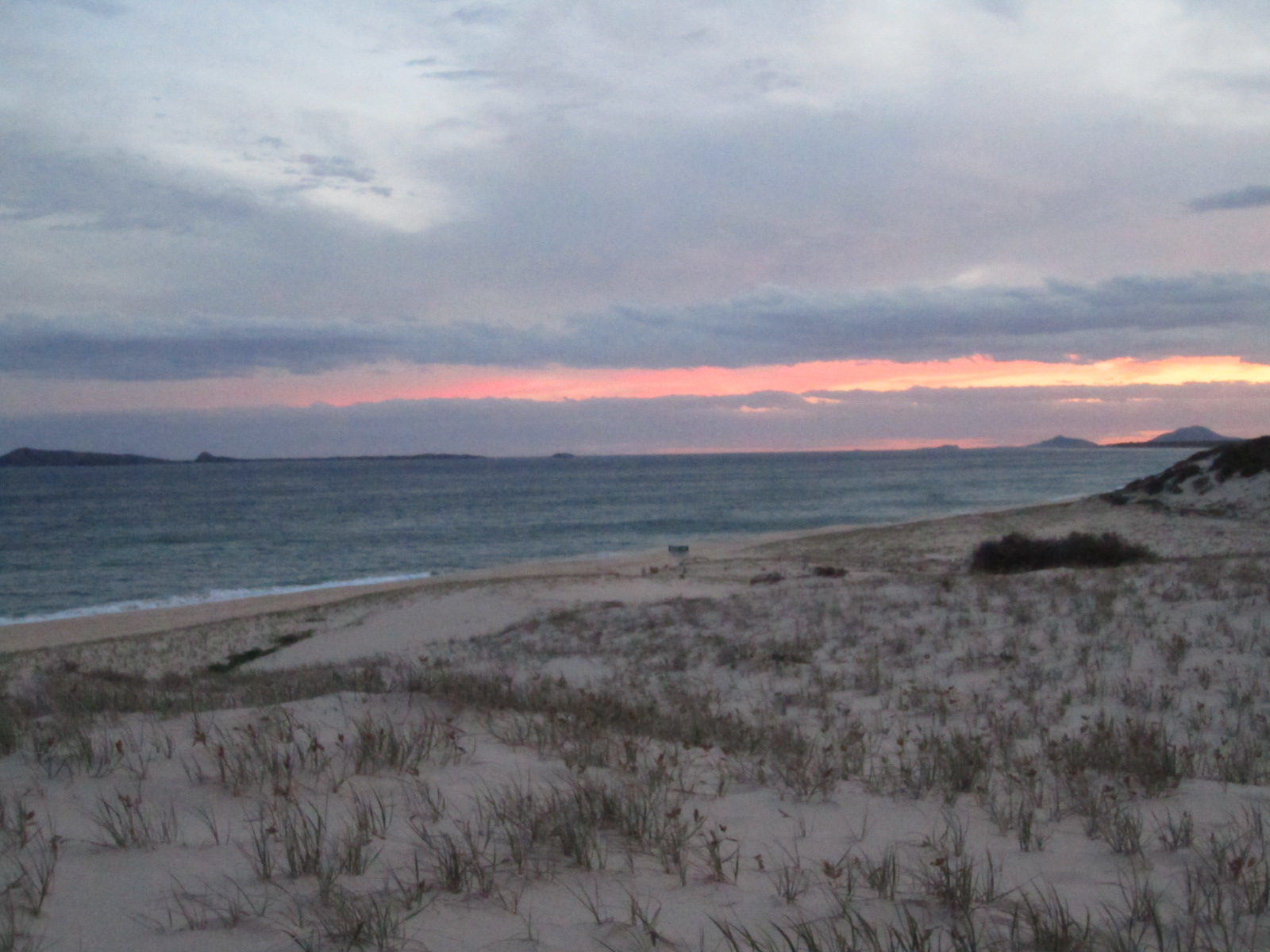
Dee's Corner

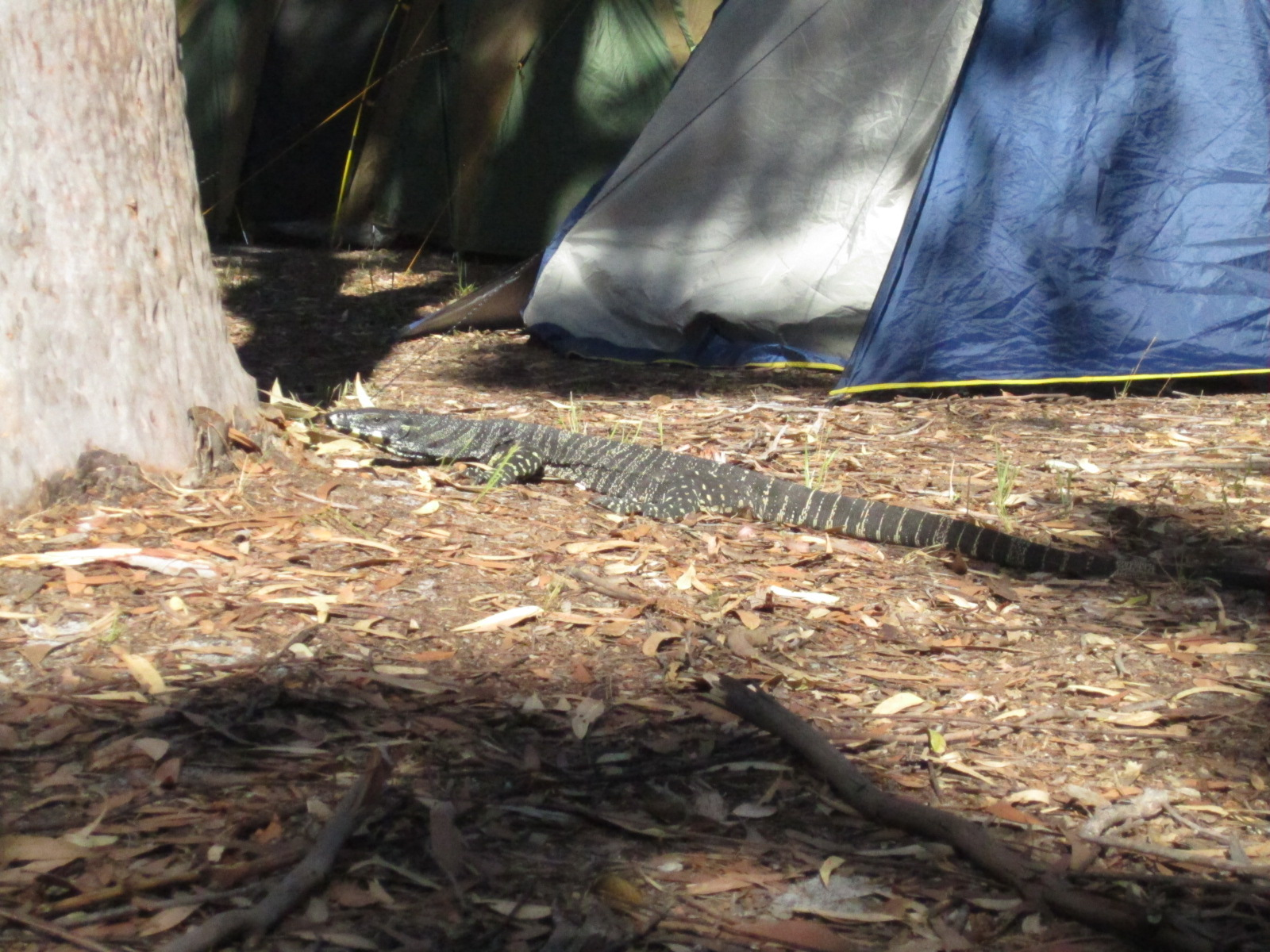
Goanna at one of the campsites

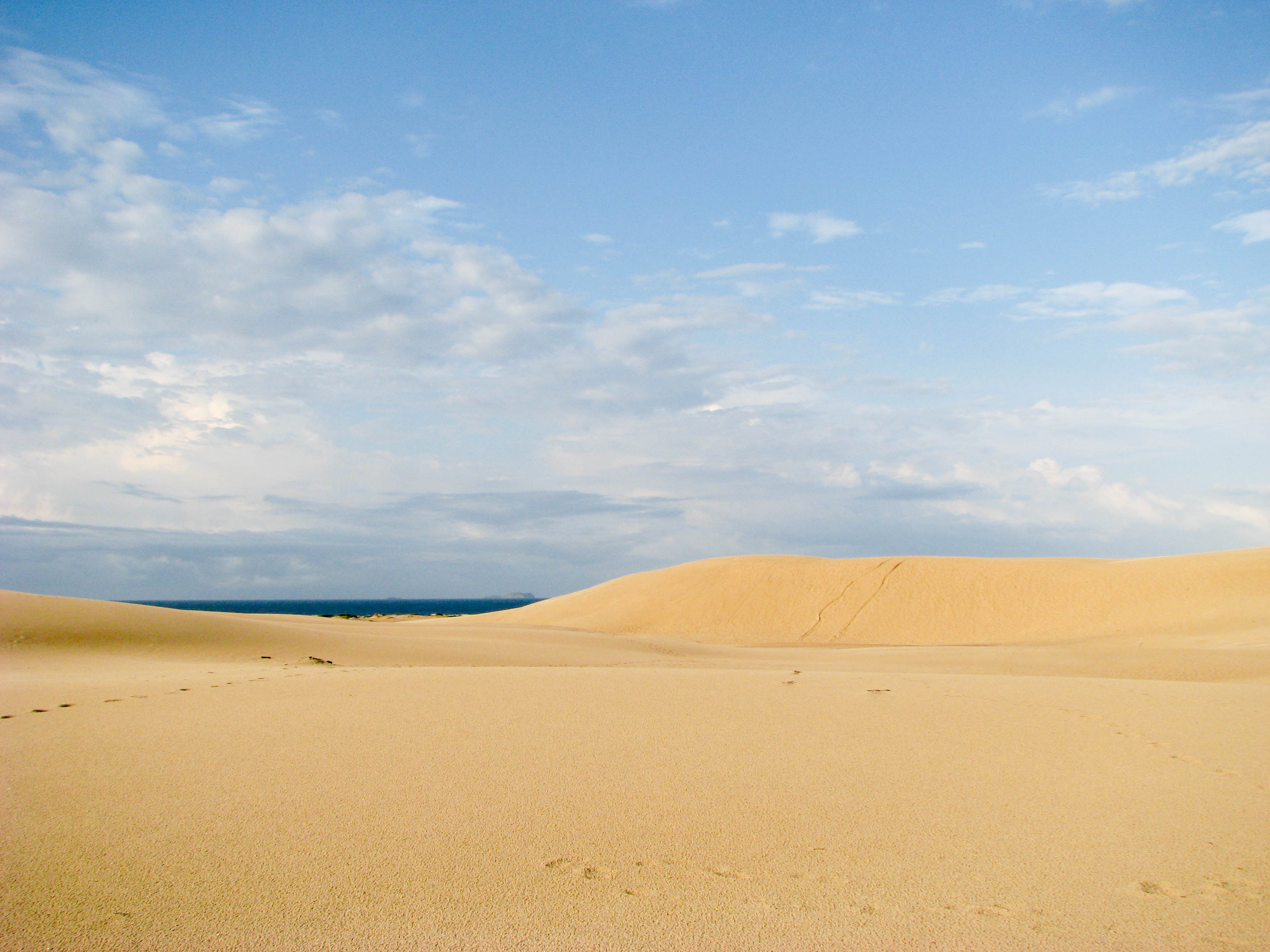
Sand dunes at Myall Lakes National Park

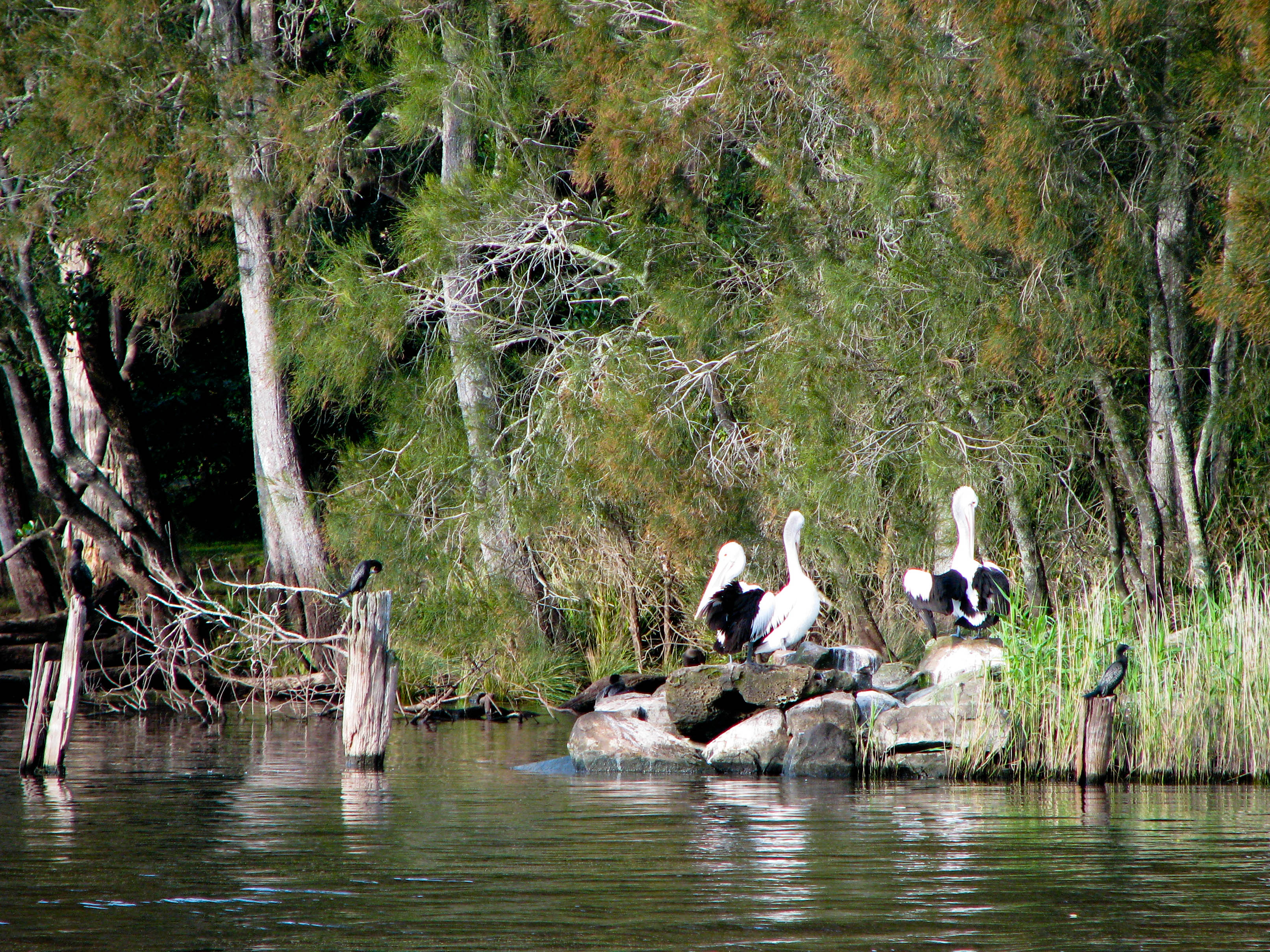
Local fauna at Myall Lakes National Park

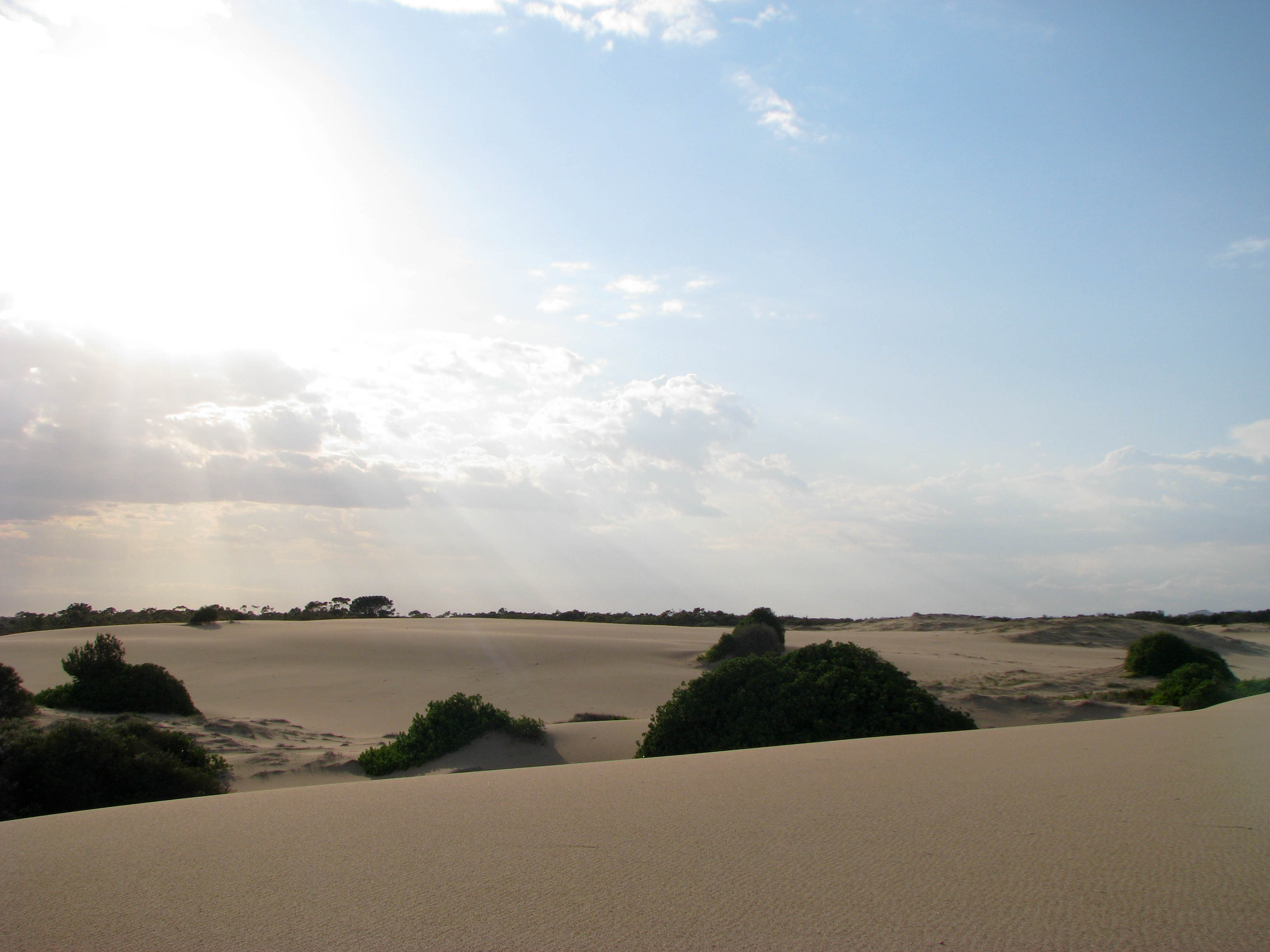
Sand dunes at Myall Lakes National Park

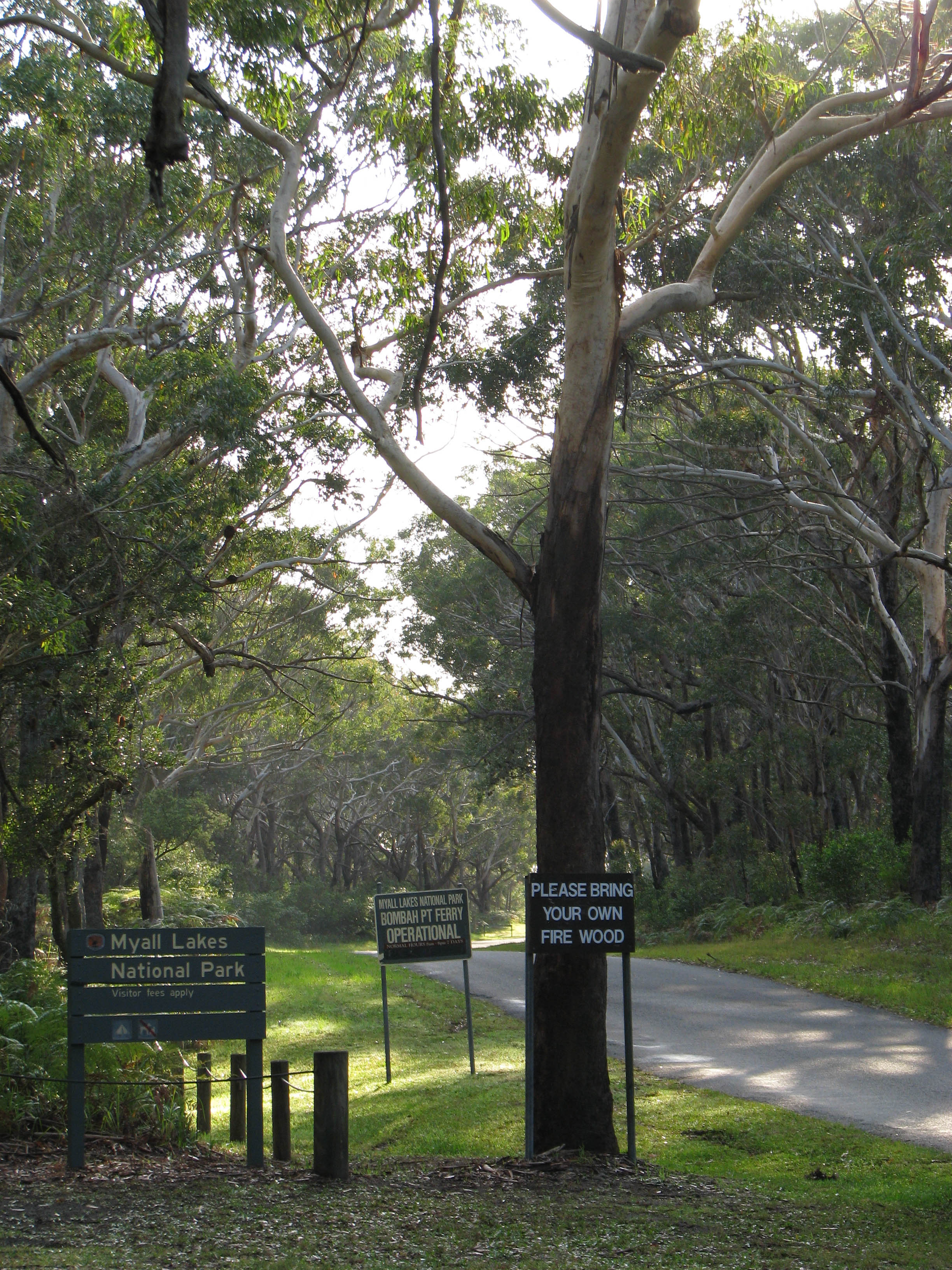
Park entrance at Myall Lakes National Park

== See also ==
- Protected areas of New South Wales
- Myall Lakes National Park travel guide from Wikivoyage
