= Worimi =

First Nations people of eastern Australia

The Worimi (also spelt Warrimay or Warrimee) are an Aboriginal Australian people from the Port Stephens and Great Lakes regions of coastal New South Wales, Australia. Before British colonisation, their country extended from the Hunter River estuary in the south to Forster/Tuncurry in the north and as far west as the Willams River. Historically, they were referred to as the Port Stephens tribe.

== Country ==
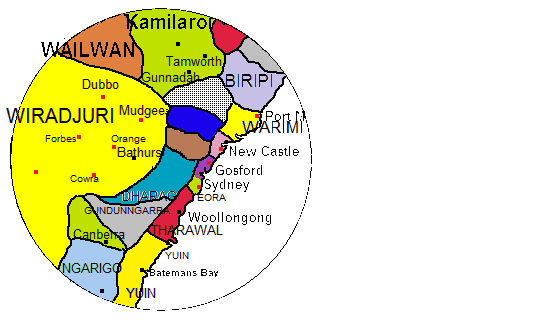
Traditional lands of Australian Aboriginal tribes around the Worimi (Note: This map is indicative only.)

According to Norman Tindale and other anthropologists, Worimi country extended over the coastal and riverine area 1,500 square miles (3,900 km^{2}) from the northern bank of the lower Hunter River in the south to what is now the coastal town of Forster near Cape Hawke in the north. This included Port Stephens, the Karuah River region, Myall Lakes and the Myall River region. It ran inland roughly as far as the Williams River and toward Raymond Terrace in the southwest.

== Social organisation ==
The Worimi were divided into several clans or nurras:

- Garuagal or Karuagal (the inland country west and south of Port Stephens and to the lower Hunter) (Note: Elkin states:'living along the tidal reaches of the Hunter River from its mouth to Maitland.' (Elkin 1932, p. 360))
- Maiangal (coastal area south of Port Stephens)
- Gamipingal (northern side of Port Stephens, left bank of Karuah River) (Note: Elkin adds:'and east of the Karuah River to Tea Gardens.' (Elkin 1932, p. 360))
- Buraigal (right bank of the Karuah up to Stroud) (Note: Elkin adds: "from Limeburner's Creek up to Stroud".(Elkin 1932, p. 360))
- Garawerrigal (coastal area from the Myall River)
- Warringal (around Telegherry Creek)
- Warrimee (around Port Stephens)
- Yeerungal (Myall Lakes area)
- Birrimbai (Bungwahl Flat)
- Birroongal (Myall River)

There is some evidence that the Tobwabba clan around Wallis Lake were also Worimi but they could have identified more as Biripi people.

The Gringai people of the Williams River, Gloucester and Dungog region are also, in some contexts, considered as Worimi or "Port Stephens Blacks".

== Language ==
The language of the Worimi people is known Gathang. This language group encompassed the coastal and riverine region between Port Macquarie to the north and Broken Bay to the south, and included the Worimi, Gringai, Biripi, Wonnarua, Geawegal and Awabakal/Kuringai people. They are all considered to be culturally and linguistically closely related and their dialects only differed slightly from each other. This language is undergoing revival in the 21st century.

== Culture and traditions ==
The Worimi fostered, cared for and lived on resources found within their country. Marine food, especially shell-fish were favoured by people living closest to the sea. Due to the reliability of that resource, it may have been preferred over land animals. Supplementary foods such as the roots of the bungwahl fern added carbohydrates to their diet. Animals that were abundant included fish, kangaroos and goannas, possums, snakes and flying foxes (kundewung). Other vegetables eaten included the stalks of the Gymea lily (pooloongearn), and the bloom of the banksia.

Painting of Worimi families camped in the Port Stephens area by Augustus Earle, 1826

Like other First Nations groups from eastern Australia, the Worimi hunted with spears that were hardened and straightened by fire (wuttar) and shaped with the sharp edge of a shell. Wommeras (hornerah) were used to improve the throwing distance of the spears. Other utensils they manufactured included stone tomahawks, fishing hooks (birooyee) made from shell; nets made from stringy bark (punnah); the waddy and boomerang made from heavy ironbark (teekurah) wood; fishing spears (motig or tutti); torches made from tea tree bark; and wooden shields (koreil) decorated with red, yellow and white ochre. Bark canoes (cooeyung) were also commonly made for fishing and transport across the various waterways. Small paddles (wolloong) were used to propel the canoes.

The Worimi believed in a number of spirits and creator beings such as a sky spirit who created animals and transformed them into humans. They also feared an evil spirit named Koin who would stalk humans and kill them if the chance arose. Funeral ceremonies included wrapping the corpse in a bark shroud and burial was often performed in sandy ground. Mourners would apply a covering of white ochre to their heads and the mourning period would finish when the ochre had completely fallen off by itself.

They lived in patrilineal clans (nurra) and totemic moieties within these clans determined marriage partners. Initiation rites (poombit) were performed on adolescents at special designated ceremonial sites. A system of justice was also carried out at other special sites where the alleged transgressor would appear before a community trial and then face punishment in the form of having the affected persons throw spears at them until retribution was considered fulfilled.

== History of contact with British colonists ==
=== Early contact ===
Captain Cook was the first European to sight Worimi land, sailing past in May 1770. After naming Port Stephens, he commented that "we saw several smokes a little way in the Country upon the flat land; by this I did suppose that there were Lagoons which afforded subsistence for the Natives".

The British began to colonise the nearby Sydney region in 1788 as convict outpost, and over time some of these convicts managed to escape. In 1790, four convicts; John Tarwood, George Lee, George Connoway and John Watson absconded north in a boat and landed at Port Stephens. The Worimi welcomed them and allowed the four convicts to enter their society. The convicts later "spoke in high terms of the pacific disposition and gentle manners of the natives". Each of them were thought to be deceased ancestors returned from the sea and had names and wives allotted to them. One or two subsequently had children to the Worimi women. These convicts lived with the Worimi for five years until they were picked up by a passing British vessel in 1795 and returned to Sydney.

Also in 1795, a British surveying expedition under Charles Grimes was sent to map Port Stephens. The Worimi initially welcomed Grimes with a corroboree but soon after, one of Grimes' assistants shot a Worimi man when Grimes was threatened with a spear.

The next major visit by the British was not until 1811 when Governor Macquarie led a brief seagoing expedition to Port Stephens. He met several Worimi on the north and south shores of the bay, exchanging food with them. A Worimi man personally traded a fish with the governor's wife, Elizabeth Macquarie, who was accompanying her husband on the voyage.

In 1818, explorer John Oxley was returning to Sydney from an expedition along the coast of New South Wales. As his party crossed the mouth of the Coolongolook River at what is now Forster, Oxley encountered around seventy people of the Tobwabba clan of Worimi. One of his assistants was speared while trying to cut down a cabbage palm. As they continued south to the Myall Lakes, Oxley noted that:

"the natives are extremely numerous along this part of the coast; these extensive lakes, which abound with fish, being extremely favourable to their easy subsistence: large troops of them appear on the beaches, whilst their canoes on the lakes are equally numerous".

Near Seal Rocks, Oxley initially had friendly meetings with the Worimi but their tents were later showered with spears, one just missing Oxley. He subsequently named this site Treachery Beach. On the rest of their journey along the beaches toward Port Stephens, Oxley maintained an advance group of armed men to clear their way of the Worimi who were present in "considerable numbers".

=== Arrival of cedar-getters and soldiers ===
Painting by Joseph Lycett of Worimi attacking a boat of Europeans at Port Stephens c.1817

The hostility of the Worimi toward Oxley's expeditioners was probably due to the arrival of gangs of cedar-getters in the Port Stephens and Myall Lakes region from around 1815. These groups of loggers consisted of hardened convicts, sent by colonial capitalists such as Simeon Lord to cut and harvest the large red cedar trees for their valuable timber. The cedar-getters were notoriously violent toward the Worimi men and women, which induced a retaliatory attitude toward white men in general. In one instance, a cedar-getter stationed on the Karuah River killed ten Worimi people in a short period of time.

Vessels such as the Elizabeth Henrietta were chartered to collect the cedar logs at Port Stephens. One of this ship's boats was famously attacked by the Worimi off Nelson Head in 1817 which resulted in the wounding of the convict artist Joseph Lycett who happened to be on board and later produced a painting of the incident.

In 1821, the colonial authorities established a convict settlement at Port Macquarie to the north of Worimi country and by 1823, a significant number of prisoners were being sent there. Some of these convicts attempted to escape south to Sydney. Worimi people residing around Cape Hawke were rewarded when they detained and handed over five runaways to a passing British ship.

The problem of runaway convicts continued and in 1824 a small permanent garrison consisting of a corporal and five soldiers of the 57th Regiment was established at Port Stephens to intercept them. This garrison was posted at what became known as Soldiers Point. The Worimi were useful to the soldiers in helping capture escaped convicts and relations were reportedly amicable. The garrison was moved to the north side of Port Stephens in May 1826 to guard the newly established Australian Agricultural Company settlement.

=== Australian Agricultural Company ===
1828 chart of the Australian Agricultural Company land grant covering most of Worimi country

In 1824, one of the first joint stock companies in Australia was established by Royal Charter. It was called the Australian Agricultural Company (AACo) and it had a nominal capital of £1,000,000 divided into 10,000 shares. Its creation was developed through the lobbying of the prominent colonist John Macarthur, who wanted a leading stake in the capitalisation of New South Wales land, particularly for the development of the wool industry. The Royal Charter allowed the company to take a free grant of land in the colony of up to one million acres. The company's board included leading British Members of Parliament and directors from the Bank of England and the East India Company. Likewise, its major stockholders and committee members were prominent and wealthy colonists.

The directors of the AACo decided to take their enormous million acre grant in the region that encompassed the area between Port Stephens and the Manning River, from the coast to the Karuah River. This covered almost the entire country of the Worimi, who were not consulted and were unaware that their land had been usurped by a foreign company.

==== Robert Dawson and the Worimi ====
In January 1826, the company's agent, Robert Dawson, was guided to Port Stephens from Newcastle by a young Worimi man named "Ben". Dawson maintained a friendly approach to the Worimi and promised to protect them from the cedar-getters who had "shot their relations and friends [and left] many orphans". He decided to locate the principal settlement of the AACo at Carabean (which he later called Carrington) on the north shore of Port Stephens. He was soon followed by around 200 convicts and servants with 200 cattle and 700 sheep, all of which were property of the AACo.

The six hundred or so Worimi who resided around Carabean were very helpful to the company employees, assisting them greatly in building bark huts and providing them with water and food, particularly fish. They also guided Dawson up the Karuah River showing him the best open areas to graze his sheep. The Worimi were rewarded with tobacco, sugar, flour and clothing. Several Worimi men such as "Crosely" and "Sinbad" became sailors for the company's boats, while others such as "Heppie" served as "native constables" to police their own people against stealing and to intercept runaway convict employees.

In May 1826, when a gang of cedar-getters killed an eight-year-old Worimi boy named "Tommy" in the Myall River region, Dawson kept to his promise and had the perpetrators arrested and convicted, although their death sentences were commuted to transportation to Norfolk Island. However, when a respected Worimi elder known as "Tony" was shot dead by a company policeman, the only punishment given was to have the constable removed from the settlement.

The Worimi were displeased with the lack of justice following Tony's murder and refused to work at the company's settlement leaving the settlers temporarily without an integral labour force. Likewise, the Worimi around the Myall River region displayed their indignance by spearing a shepherd. Dawson subsequently organised an armed military party to the Myall Lakes to capture those responsible. He was unsuccessful but was satisfied that he had caused "a salutary terror with which our vigourous pursuit inspired in the natives".

Dawson remediated the company's relations with the Port Stephens Worimi and with their help as guides, he expanded the company's assets northward by establishing farms at Booral, Stroud and Gloucester. This was the country of the northern clans of the Worimi and Dawson was able to gain control by both intimidating them with armed men from the southern clans and through the usual incentives of food, employment and tobacco. He described the Worimi as a "mild and harmless race", and attributed any harm they might cause to the maltreatment they received from the timbermen. Some, like "Dawly" a leading man of the Booral clan who had previously been shot by cedar-getters, refused to accept Dawson's authority and chose to continue a traditional lifestyle.

In 1828, Dawson was dismissed as the company's superintendent and replaced firstly by John Macarthur, then by James Ebsworth and in 1830 by the Arctic explorer, Edward Parry.

==== The enforcement of AACo control ====
With the removal of Dawson and his more benign approach to relations with the Worimi, the AACo under his successors implemented a harsher policy against the original occupants. In late 1828, in response to Worimi resistance in the northern areas of its grant, James Ebsworth organised a punitive expedition consisting of soldiers and also armed men from the Port Stephens clan. They shot and killed at least one man, while another named Willamur was captured and transported to jail in Sydney.

Edward Parry's "most strict semi-military regime" in charge of the AACo properties enforced this combative strategy with the Worimi. When a shepherd was speared at Lawler's sheep station in 1830, Parry furnished the companys' soldiers, constables and armed servants with as much ammunition as they required and sent them on a punitive expedition to the upper Karuah River under the lead of Chief Constable Field. This mission resulted in the killing of at least one Worimi man and the wounding of several others.

Field was sent out again only a few days later to exact summary punishment against the northern clans of the Worimi after another shepherd was speared. This time Field was in charge of a group of armed southern Worimi men led by a "black constable" named "Jonathan". This militia intercepted and killed a supposed leader of the northern Worimi and severely wounded a number of others. Parry wrote that he was confident that these examples of "summary justice will have a beneficial effect in deterring the blacks".

However, the northern clans of Worimi continued their resistance, spearing more shepherds and taking sheep. In 1833, a worker named Henderson at the company's Worrawang cattle station north-east of Gloucester was killed and Parry organised a large party of mounted soldiers and armed company employees on a punitive expedition. Despite tying up and flogging a Worimi man to extract information, the killers of Henderson were not located. They did however shoot a number of Aboriginal people not involved in the spearing. This provoked a complaint from the pioneering Manning River settler, William Wynter, who accused Parry of undue violence against Aboriginal people, including placing bounties "for the heads of some of the blacks".

Other techniques were also applied in removing the northern clans of Worimi from the land. In 1833, multiple sources refer to one or possibly two mass poisonings of Aboriginal Australians by employees of the AACo at an out-station called Upper Gangat. Arsenic was placed in dampers and given to the Aboriginal people to eat. Many died and the place was subsequently known as Baal Bora, a pidgin English term loosely translated as "no more dancing/ceremony". The locality is still called Belbora which is situated on the Bucketts Way east of Gloucester.

=== The Williams River clans ===
The Worimi of the Williams River region, also known as the Gringai people, were outside the AACo grant but were still heavily affected by colonial infiltration. From around 1815, cedar-getters and then pastoralists with their convict labourers taking up land grants, made their way up the river, displacing and killing the Gringai, with most survivors being forced into the margins of colonial society or into the upper reaches of the river. British settlements such as Raymond Terrace, Clarence Town and Dungog replaced their communities.

By 1834 it was estimated that up to 500 Gringai people had perished since the onset of colonisation and that the survivors faced "certain annihilation".

At this time, at least twenty wealthy colonists had appropriated thousands of acres of Worimi land, including the Mackenzie brothers, George and Robert (sons of Sir George Mackenzie, 7th Baronet, who produced a study on the skull of the Aboriginal man Cannabaygal) and their friends the Mossman brothers. In 1834, one of Archibald Mossman's huts was robbed by a group of Gringai men in the Upper Williams River region. The convict servants of the Mossmans and the Mackenzies were given guns and ordered to capture those responsible. In a resultant skirmish with a group of Gringai, a Gringai man named Wongkabihan (or Jackey) speared one of Mossman's servants named John Flinn who later died. Wongkabihan was arrested and sent to Sydney in chains to face court. He was found guilty and sentenced to transportation for life in Van Diemen's Land where he died only a month later.

=== Conflict and massacres near Rawdon Vale ===
In 1835, one of the Mackenzie brothers, Robert Ramsay Mackenzie, took up additional land along the upper Barrington River west of Gloucester. Worimi/Gringai resistance here was fierce and five of Mackenzie's convict servants were killed. A large punitive expedition was formed consisting of armed colonists from the Williams River, their servants, mounted police and also a few soldiers from the AACo properties. They swept through the area, massacring Aboriginal people at two locations, namely at Mount Mackenzie and on the upper Bowman River, annihilating almost the entire clan that resided in the area.

Governor Bourke was petitioned by the Upper Williams River colonists for military assistance in crushing the Aboriginal resistance in the area. Bourke complied and sent Major William Croker and fifty soldiers of the 17th Regiment with orders "to levy war...in a vigorous manner" and "to teach the aborigines that the day of retribution when it arrives is terrible and bloody". Croker and his men spent a month scouring the region before returning to Sydney. How many Worimi/Gringai were killed during this operation is unknown but at least one prisoner was taken, a man named "Charley".

"Charley" was tried in court in August 1835 and found guilty of murdering a shepherd. He was sentenced to death and his public execution by hanging was decided to be conducted at Dungog. "Charley" was executed outside the Dungog courthouse on 4 September 1835.

=== Life and continued resistance during the 1840s ===
By the early 1840s there was reported to be around only 50 Gringai still in the Williams River district and around 500 Worimi living around Port Stephens, Stroud, Gloucester and the Myall Lakes. The AACo only employed around 20 of these people, most of whom were paid in rations and clothes.

A few young Worimi men from Port Stephens who were deemed sufficiently useful and fit with a good knowledge of English were requisitioned by the AACo to help guide employees and livestock to the company's new land acquisitions to the northwest on the Liverpool Plains. The more adventurous such as "Wommai" and "Billy Bombat" were even drafted to join the historically significant expeditions of Ludwig Leichhardt. Wommai accompanied Leichhardt in 1846 and 1847 on his journeys into what became Queensland. Both Wommai and Billy Bombat disappeared, and presumably perished, with the rest of Leichhardt's expeditionary members on his ill-fated 1848 journey.

Those Worimi who continued to resist British occupation of their lands retreated to the mountainous and forested regions to the north of Port Stephens. They made occasional raids on the British settlements, notably on a homestead outside of Stroud where the young daughter of a AACo clerk named Easterbrook was abducted. A party of armed soldiers and AACo employees pursued them and "eleven blacks were killed and the child recovered".

The AACo were still arming "friendly" Worimi men residing at the company settlements in order to drive off the "marauding bands" of "blacks" to the north. Some of these weapons found their way into the hands of the insurgents. By the late 1840s, these rebel Worimi had not only obtained a significant cache of firearms, they had also linked up with Biripi people resisting colonial invasion in the Manning River region.

After an assault on a shepherd in late 1847, a small party of mounted police were sent out from Dungog toward the Manning River in order to capture the "three blackfellows" responsible. A group of rebels heard about the approach of the troopers and organised themselves into a force of 30-40 men armed with around a dozen muskets and plenty of ammunition. A short battle occurred along the upper Wallamba River where the police were defeated and fled back to Dungog. The place where this occurred was subsequently called "Waterloo" near what is now the locality of Firefly.

Emboldened by this victory, the Worimi-Biripi insurgents continued a campaign against colonists in the Wallamba and Manning region into 1848. They forced at least one settler to abandon his cattle station and destroyed buildings on another to obtain nails which they cut up to use as buckshot for their firearms.

The local authorities requested military assistance to quash the insurgency and a detachment of 26 soldiers was deployed to Port Stephens. This force was supplied for an extensive campaign, being equipped with mules to carry their ammunition and rations.

The soldiers were placed under the command of Captain Reynolds and also the local magistrate Philip King. King was the grandson of the former Governor of New South Wales, P.G. King and the son of the AACo commissioner at that time, P.P. King. Philip King had been busy heading a group of mounted police arresting "every native they could find" and imprisoning them in the jail at Stroud in relation to the rape of a girl by a Worimi man named "Darby". He was then called upon to lead this force of soldiers and mounted police to the Manning region "to inflict such punishment on the natives as may be deemed salutary".

The "records are silent" on what this punitive expedition achieved but there was a brief enquiry into King's actions over a raid on a "blacks camp" along the Manning River in March 1848. King led eight troopers on this dawn raid upon a group of sleeping Aboriginal people, killing an eighty-year-old man and severely wounding a young girl. They then "amused themselves by destroying the camp, burning the clothes left behind and killing the puppies".

The enquiry went nowhere but it gave a clear indication of what the military campaign against the rebels was like. The colonial culture of covering-up reprisal massacres can be adequately summarised by a historian of the Manning region who wrote that he was aware of "grim stories...of wholesale slaughter of Aborigines in the 1840s and 1850s [but] none of these may be repeated by me".

=== Fringe camps, reserves and missions ===
Frontier conflict in the region wound down from the 1850s and the surviving Worimi and Gringai drifted to the edges of colonial society. Along with violence, further depopulation occurred due to introduced diseases such as measles, syphilis and tuberculosis. Poverty, malnutrition and despair affected most. Over the years, many young females had been abducted for sexual purposes by settlers, cedar-getters and employees of the AACo, with mixed heritage births becoming common. Some were born of Chinese fathers due to labourers from China being imported by AACo during the 1850s. All of this resulted in much loss of traditional Indigenous culture, language and lifestyle.

Those who had some protection in the form of rations and shelter provided by the AACo in exchange for their labour, found this source of security had finished by the 1870s as the company gradually sold off its assets in the region. They became fringe dwellers, camping on the edges of towns such as Dungog, Stroud, Forster, Bulahdelah, Tea Gardens and Gloucester where they fended for themselves, occasionally receiving hand-outs of food and blankets, or obtaining casual work.

Some Gringai identities such as "Doughboy Billy", "Brandy" and "Nancy Green" were designated as the so-called "King of their tribe" or "Last of their tribe". When they died most were buried at the "blacks' cemetery" on the Violet Hill property of the Abbott family behind the old rectory building on what is now the corner of Myles and Verge Streets in Dungog. The surviving younger generation of Gringai at this time were deemed a nuisance. Two young boys who were begging on Fosterton Road near Dungog were poisoned to death when they were given food deliberately laced with toxic substances. This event was not regarded as important enough for an enquiry.

With the creation of the New South Wales Aboriginal Protection Board in 1883, the lives of the surviving Worimi and Gringai were placed under its control. Aboriginal reserves were created at Barrington (1884), Forster (1895), and at Karuah (1898). Worimi and Gringai were encouraged, coerced or forced onto these reserves which provided a basic level of shelter, food and sometimes education. However, the reserves at Barrington and Forster were closed in 1907 and 1914 respectively, and many were forced to live at the reserves either at Karuah near Port Stephens or at Purfleet on the Manning River.

Missionaries from the Aborigines Inland Mission became highly involved at the Karuah reserve and its residents were subjected to a prolonged program of Christianisation. The missionaries controlled their education and culture, while the bureaucrats from the Board controlled their lives. This state of affairs only started to ease from the 1940s when changes in government policies facilitated a gradual easing of restrictions on Aboriginal people.

== Worimi in the modern day ==
Today, the Worimi Local Aboriginal Land Council is working closely with Worimi descendants to provide opportunities that promote, foster and protect their culture and heritage. In July 2016, the New South Wales Government recognised 5.9 ha (14.6 acres) of the suburb of Soldiers Point as a place of historical value for Aboriginal people, noting the particular importance in cultural and spiritual terms that it held for the Worimi.

== Alternative names ==
- Bahree
- Cottong
- Gadang, Kutthung, Guttahn, Kattang (language name)
- Gingai/Gringai/Gooreenggai
- Karrapath/Carapath
- Kutthack
- Molo
- Port Stephens tribe
- Wannungine
- Warrangine (at Maitland)
- Warrimee/Warramie
- Wattung/ Watthungk

Source: Tindale 1974, p. 202

== Some words ==
- garua ('salt-water', hence the hordal name, 'Garua-gal', 'belonging to the salt water')
- gami ('spear', hence the name Gamipingal, 'belonging to the spear')
