= Darawank, New South Wales =

Town in New South Wales, Australia

Darawank New South Wales
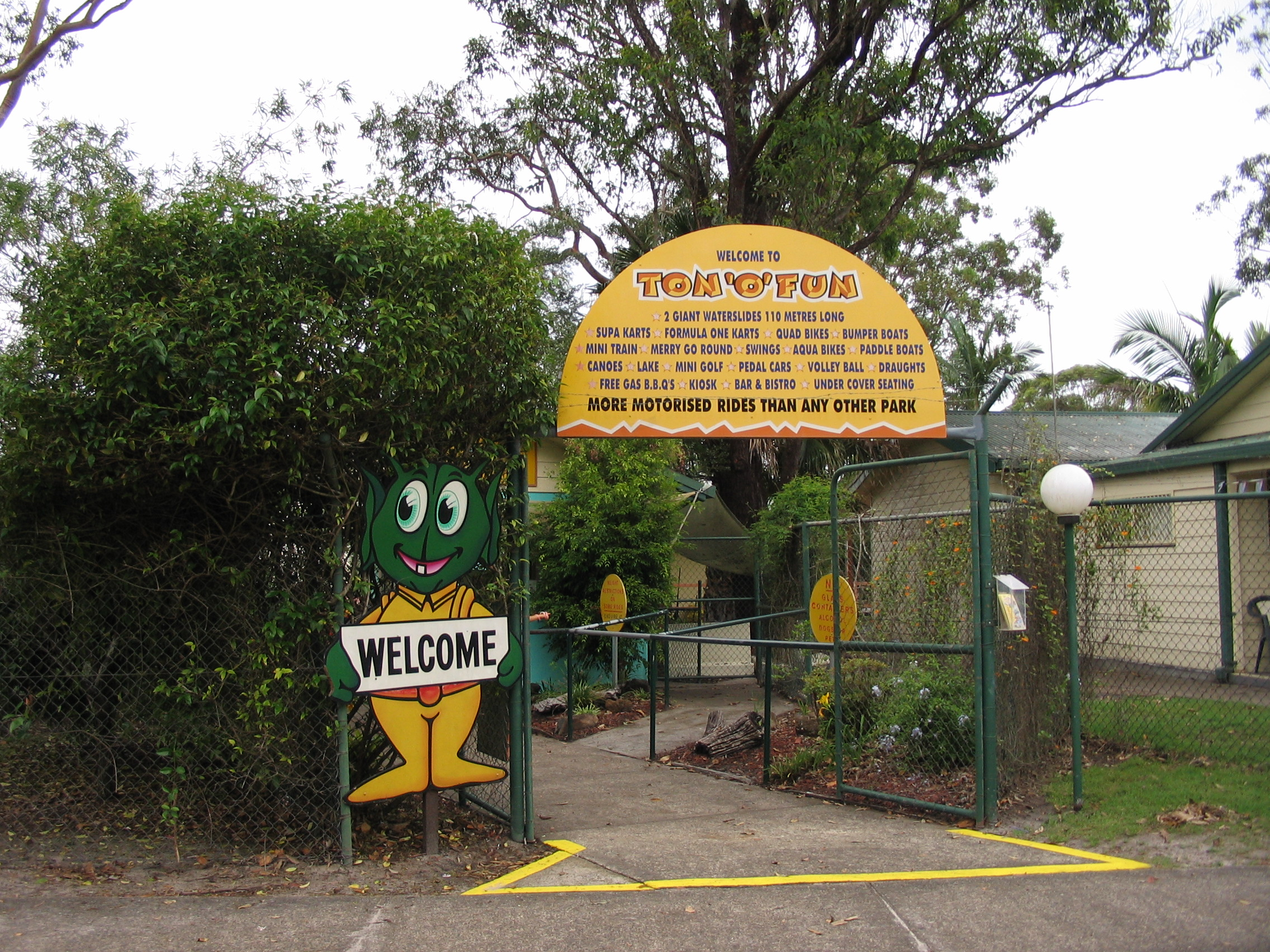
- The Ton-O-Fun amusement park

- Coordinates: 32°12′30″S 152°29′48″E
- Population: 451 (SAL 2021)
- Postcode(s): 2428
- Elevation: 12 m (39 ft)
- Time zone: AEST (UTC+10)
  - Summer (DST): AEDT (UTC+11)
- Location: 293 km (182 mi) NNE of Sydney; 153 km (95 mi) NNE of Newcastle; 14 km (9 mi) N of Forster; 25 km (16 mi) S of Taree; 55 km (34 mi) NE of Bulahdelah
- LGA(s): Mid-Coast Council
- Region: Mid North Coast
- State electorate(s): Myall Lakes
- Federal division(s): Lyne
Localities around Darawank:
Failford	Hallidays Point	Tasman Sea
Failford	Darawank	Tasman Sea
Nabiac	Tuncurry	Tuncurry

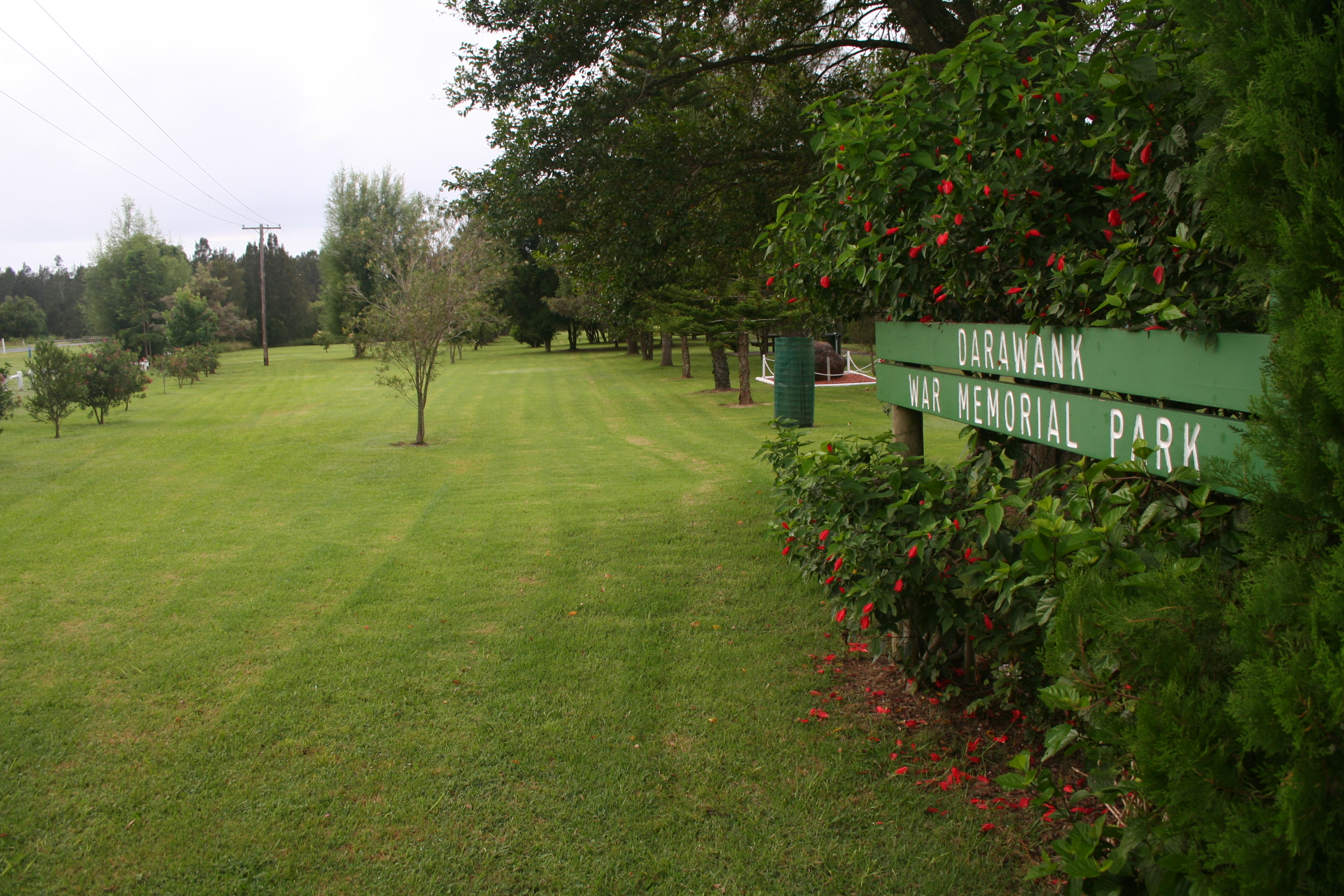
War Memorial Park

Darawank is a small village area located approximately 10 km north of Forster and Tuncurry along the Lakes Way Road towards Taree where the road meets the Wallamba River.

Darawank is Aboriginal for "Dark Waters".
