= Failford, New South Wales =

Failford New South Wales
- Coordinates: 32°05′05″S 152°26′39″E
- Population: 495 (2011 census)
  - Density: 31.8/km^{2} (82/sq mi)
- Postcode(s): 2430
- Elevation: 10 m (33 ft)
- Area: 15.6 km^{2} (6.0 sq mi)
- Time zone: AEST (UTC+10)
  - Summer (DST): AEDT (UTC+11)
- Location: 288 km (179 mi) NNE of Sydney; 149 km (93 mi) NNE of Newcastle; 25 km (16 mi) S of Taree; 17 km (11 mi) NW of Forster; 52 km (32 mi) NE of Bulahdelah
- LGA(s): Mid-Coast Council
- Region: Mid North Coast
- County: Gloucester
- Parish: Tuncurry
- State electorate(s): Myall Lakes
- Federal division(s): Lyne
Mean max temp	Mean min temp	Annual rainfall
22.7 °C; 73 °F	14.3 °C; 58 °F	1,222.2 mm 48.1 in
Suburbs around Failford:
Possum Brush	Possum Brush	Hallidays Point
Nabiac	Failford	Darawank
Minimbah	Minimbah	Darawank

Failford is a locality in the Mid-Coast Council local government area on the Mid North Coast of New South Wales, Australia. Located to the east of the Pacific Highway, Failford is about 17 km (11 mi) northwest of Forster. At the 2011 census it had a population of 495.

Failford is a water skiing and boating location with the nearby Wallamba River, which runs between Nabiac and Tuncurry. It has a caravan park on the river with its own boatramp.
