= Nabiac, New South Wales =

Nabiac Nabiyak (Birrpayi)
- Town
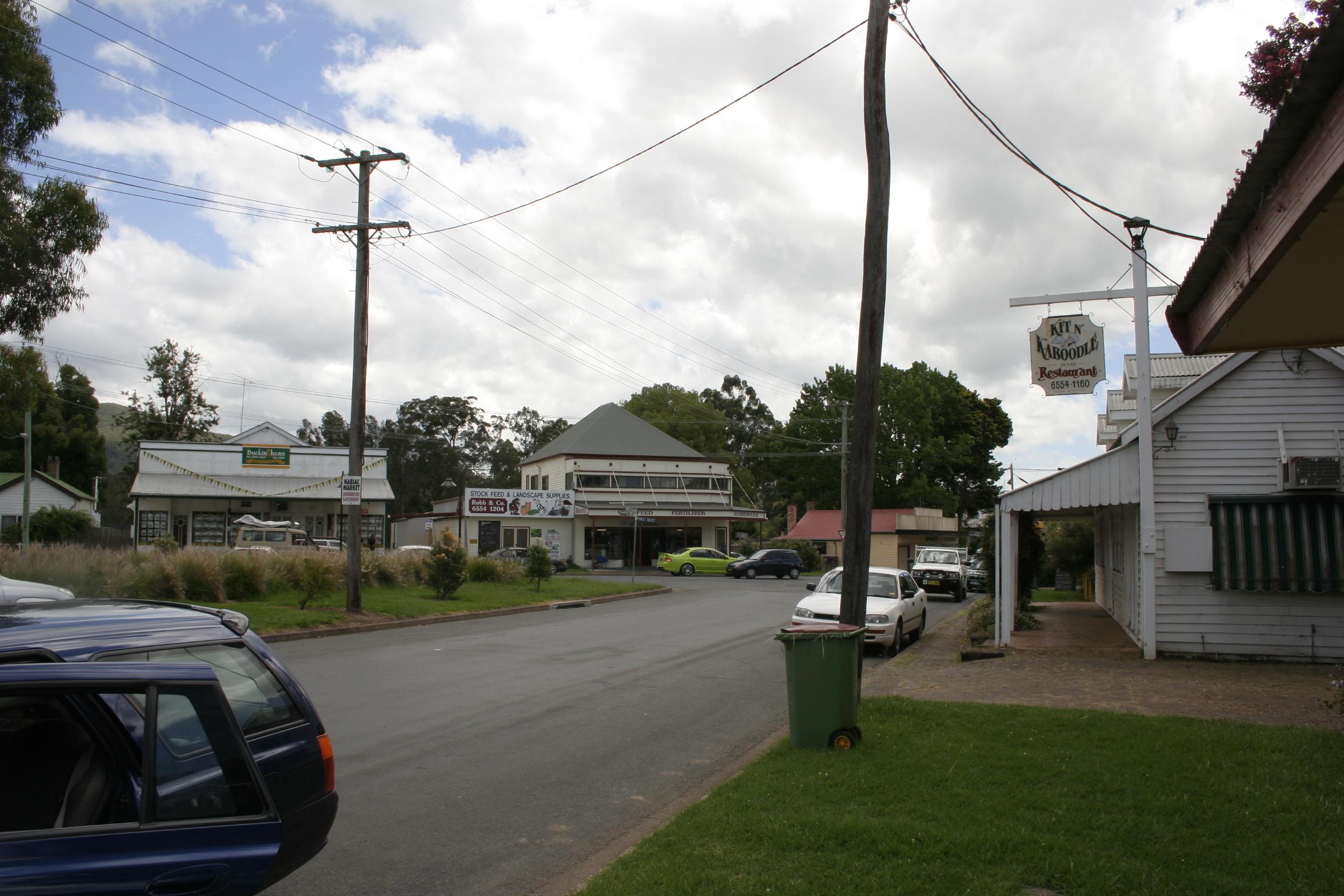
- Nabiac shops

- Coordinates: 32°06′S 152°23′E
- Country: Australia
- State: New South Wales
- LGA: Mid-Coast Council
- Location: 281 km (175 mi) NNE of Sydney; 29 km (18 mi) SSW of Taree; 23 km (14 mi) NW of Forster; 45 km (28 mi) NE of Bulahdelah; 142 km (88 mi) NNE of Newcastle

Government
  - State electorate: Myall Lakes
  - Federal division: Lyne
- Elevation: 9 m (30 ft)

Population
  - Total: 1,294 (2021 census)
- Postcode: 2312
Localities around Nabiac
Hillville	Possum Brush	Failford
Dyers Crossing	Nabiac	Darawank
Wang Wauk	Minimbah	Tuncurry

Nabiac (/næˈbiːæk/ nab-EE-ak) is a small town on the Mid North Coast, New South Wales, Australia in Mid-Coast Council. It is north-west of Forster, and south of Taree. At the 2021 census, the population of Nabiac was 1,294.

Nabiac is the central town of the Wallamba Valley. As is typical of small North Coast towns, it developed in the second half of the 19th century as a small river port (later called Bullocks Wharf on the eastern edge of the town) for the hardwood-cutting (mainly Australian red cedar) trade. Later as the valley was cleared, small-scale dairying and corn-growing became dominant but its importance has since declined. At first, milk was mainly bought by the dairy at Dyers Crossing (about 6 km west of Nabiac). Later fresh milk was also supplied to the Sydney market via the Sydney Milk Board.

The first post office in the area was established in May 1870 on the south side of the Wallamba and was initially called "Cape Hawke Post Office" after Cape Hawke, which is 30 km away. It was renamed "Clarkson's Crossing" in February 1880 and Nabiac on 1 June 1894. The Pacific Highway was rerouted through Nabiac in 1963. This included the opening of a bridge over the Wallamba to replace Clarkson's Crossing on 15 November 1958. Since then Nabiac has steadily become more of a highway service town and tourist stopping point.

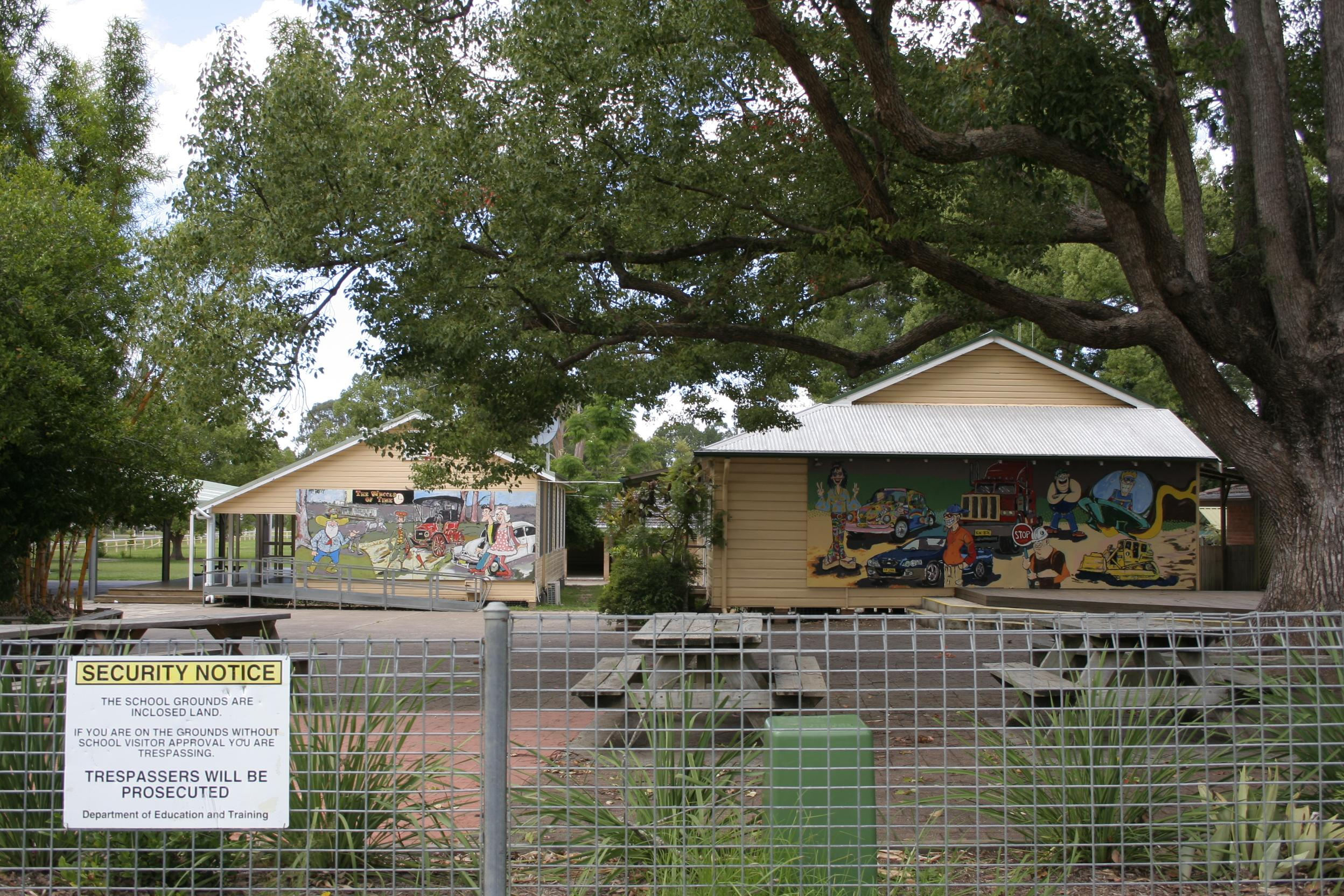
Nabiac Public School

The poet Les Murray was born in Nabiac, although his family lived in nearby Bunyah. He travelled to school in Nabiac for his primary and early high school education.
