= Wallingat River =

Coordinates: 32°12′S 152°24′E

Wallingat River Wallingat, Stony Creek

Location
- Country: Australia
- State: New South Wales
- IBRA: NSW North Coast
- District: Mid North Coast
- Local government areas: Mid-Coast Council

Physical characteristics
- Source: Wallingat National Park
  - location: near Bungwhal
  - elevation: 35 m (115 ft)
- Mouth: confluence with the Coolongolook River
  - location: at Junction Point
  - elevation: 0 m (0 ft)
- Length: 24 km (15 mi)

Basin features
- River system: Mid-Coast Council
- Tributaries
  - left: Teatree Creek
  - right: Boggy Creek, Sugar Creek (New South Wales)
- National park: Wallingat

Wallingat River, a watercourse of the Mid-Coast Council system, is located in the Mid North Coast district of New South Wales, Australia.

== Course and features ==
Wallingat River rises in low lands near Bungwhal, and flows generally north through Wallingat National Park, joined by three minor tributaries, before reaching its confluence with the Coolongolook River at Junction Point, descending 36 metres (118 ft) over its 24 kilometres (15 mi) course.

== See also ==
- Rivers of New South Wales
- List of rivers of New South Wales (L–Z)
- List of rivers of Australia
