= Wallis Island, New South Wales =

Island in Mid-Coast, New South Wales, Australia

Coordinates: 32.214°S 152.480°E

Wallis Island is an island in Wallis Lake, just south of the Coolongolook River in the mid north coast region of New South Wales, Australia. Wallis Island Nature Reserve, created in January 1983 and expanded in 1997 and 2005 covers a majority of the island, with an area of 584 ha (1,440 acres). The island also hosts an Australian chateau and fishing retreat, and a private airfield, Forster (Wallis Island) Airport.

== History ==
The area around Wallis Lake in New South Wales was a traditional Indigenous Australian settlement. The traditional custodians of this land are the Worimi people, an Aboriginal nation whose territory extends along the coast. Evidence of their long occupation includes middens, stone tools, and rock art, indicating a deep connection to the land and waterways for thousands of years.

The first Europeans, who arrived in 1790, were five convicts escaping from the Second Fleet, who lived with the Worimi for five years before being recaptured. Further contact with European settlers featured disease, conflict and land competition. In October 1818, explorer John Oxley came to the region, and he named the lake after Captain James Wallis, the commandant of the Newcastle penal settlement. In 1825, the Australian Agricultural Company (AAC) was granted a million acres for farming by the government, but it returned the land as the soil did not support farming. Later, the region was occupied by lumberjacks, who harvested timber. In the 1850s, Chinese, who were originally brought in as shepherds by the AAC, settled in the region and engaged in fishing. By the late 1800s, several Englishmen settled in the region.

== Geography ==
Wallis Island sits within Wallis Lake, just south of the Coolongolook River. The Wallis Island Nature Reserve was created in January 1983 and covers an area of 584 ha (1,440 acres). The lake itself is a large, coastal lake located on the Mid North Coast of New South Wales, about 300 km (190 mi) north of Sydney. It is governed by the Mid-Coast Council local government area. The topography is characterized by a mix of coastal plains, low-lying wetlands, and gently undulating hills. The lake itself is a large, relatively shallow body of water, covering an area of approximately 99 km^{2} (38 sq mi). It is fed by several freshwater rivers and creeks, including the Wallamba River, Pipers Creek, and Coolongolook River.

== Economy ==
The economy of the region around Wallis Lake, within the Mid-Coast Council area, is primarily driven by tourism, fishing, and agriculture. The pristine waters of the lake are renowned for their oyster farming, particularly Sydney Rock Oysters, making it a significant aquaculture hub. Commercial fishing also operates within the lake, targeting various fish species. The five-storey Chateau Le Marais, built by antique collectors Andre and Cecile Fink, is one of the glamorous fishing retreats, and considered to be self-sufficient with its own electricity generation system and solar panels. The luxurious property was initially intended to serve as the Finks' home and as a showroom for their antiques. However, after the 2008 financial crisis, the Finks' antique business declined and, in 2010, the couple were forced to put up the incomplete mansion for sale in 2010, with a price tag of $20 million. In 2019, the mansion was valued at around $16 million.
