= Wallingat National Park =

National park in Australia

- IUCN category II (national park)
- Location within New South Wales
- Location: New South Wales
- Nearest city: Smiths Lake
- Coordinates: 32°18′4″S 152°26′7″E
- Area: 65.57 km^{2} (25.32 sq mi)
- Established: 1999
- Governing body: National Parks and Wildlife Service (New South Wales)
- Website: Official website

Wallingat is a national park located in New South Wales, Australia, 211 kilometres (131 mi) northeast of Sydney. The park has forest walks, a campsite on the banks of the Wallingat River and a viewpoint, the Whoota Whoota Lookout, with views of Wallis Lake and the coast. The roads are unsealed.

Wallabies and kangaroos can be found here, as well as 200 species of birds. The average elevation of the terrain is 44 m.

== See also ==
- Protected areas of New South Wales
