= Cape Hawke =

Coastal landform in New South Wales, Australia

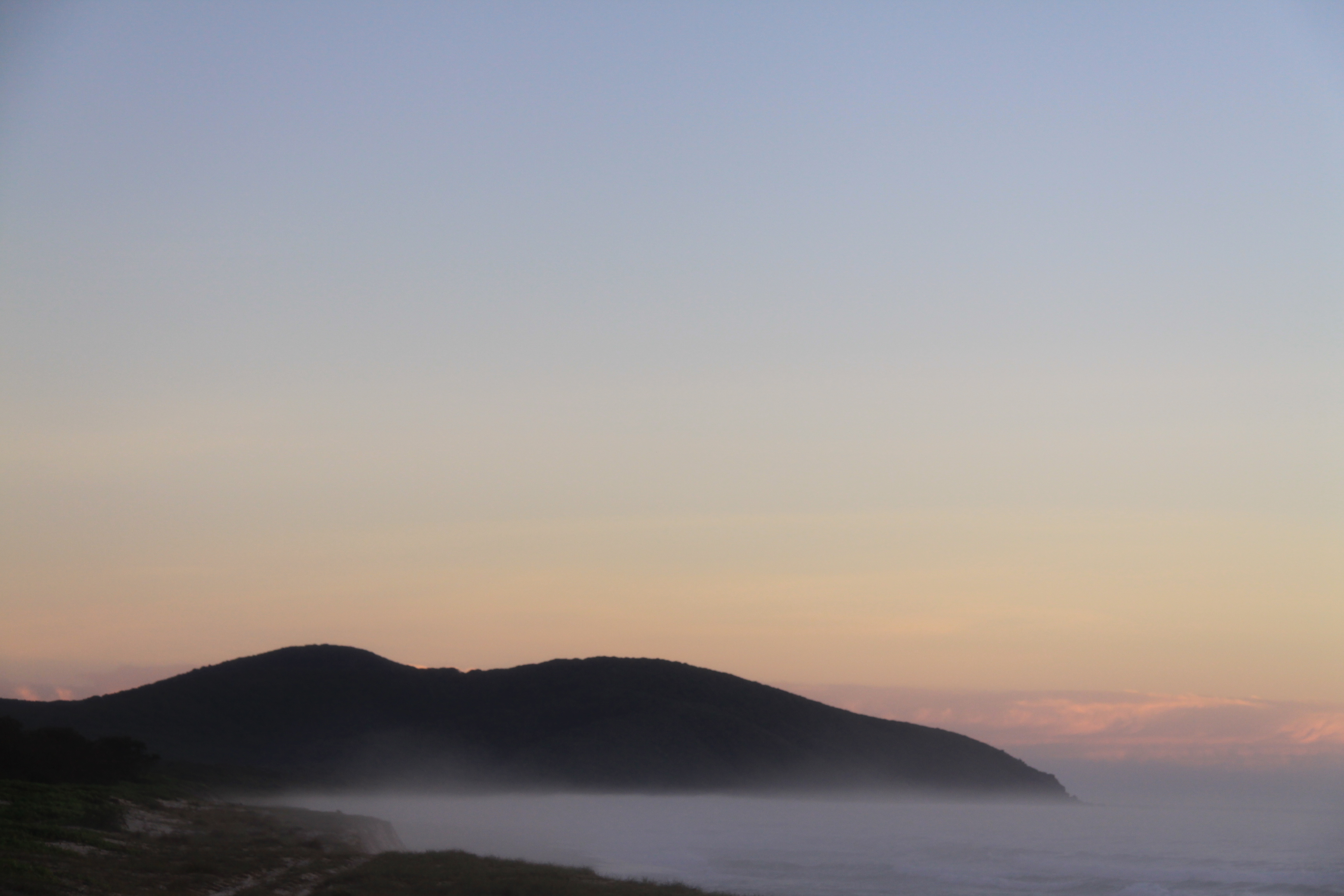
Cape Hawke

Cape Hawke (32°12′S 152°34′E) is a coastal headland in Australia on the New South Wales coast, just south of Forster/Tuncurry and within the Booti Booti National Park.

The cape was named by Captain Cook when he passed it on his Endeavour voyage on 12 May 1770, honoring Edward Hawke who was First Lord of the Admiralty.
