= Wallis Lake =

Lake in the state of New South Wales, Australia

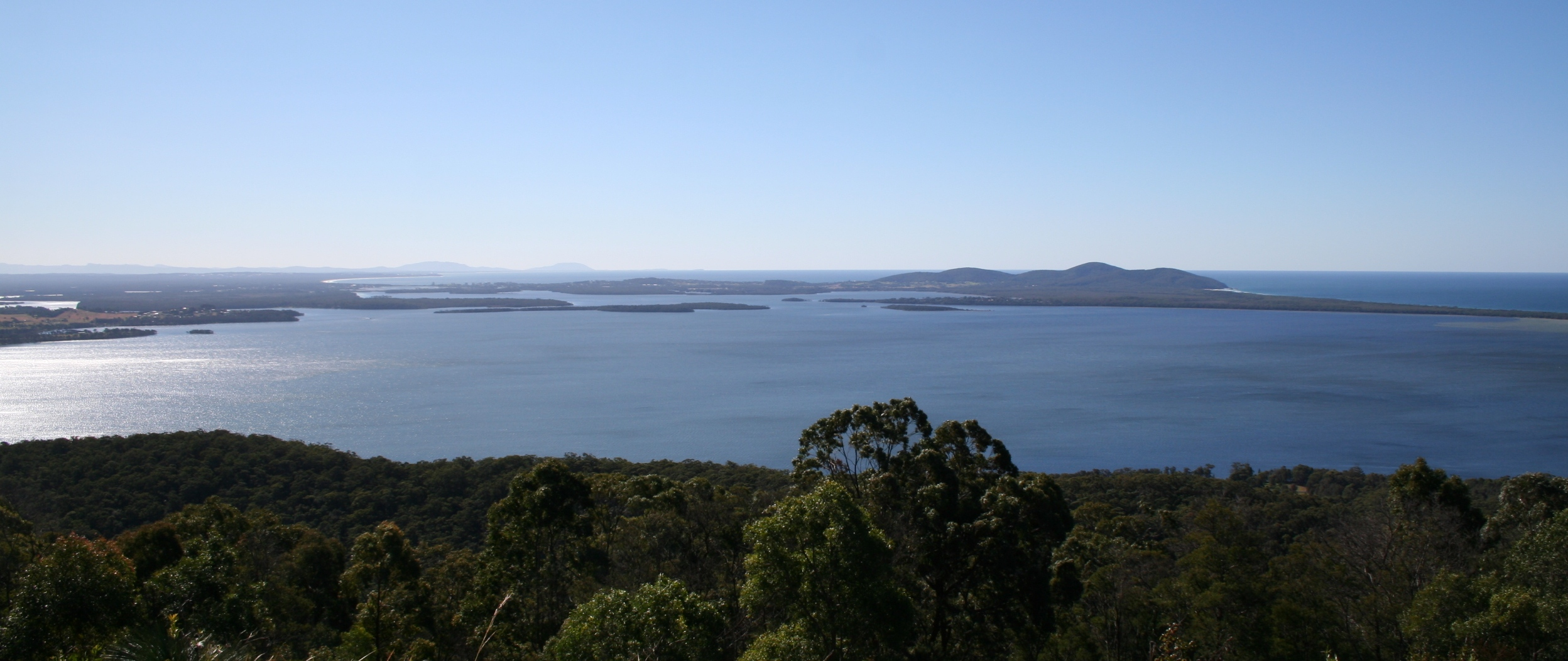

- Location within New South Wales Location within Australia
- Location: Mid North Coast, New South Wales, Australia
- Coordinates: 32°18′S 152°30′E
- Lake type: An open and trained wave dominated barrier estuary
- Primary inflows: Wallamba River, Coolongolook River, Pipers Creek
- Primary outflows: Coolongolook River to the Tasman Sea
- Catchment area: 1,196.9 square kilometres (462.1 sq mi)
- Basin countries: Australia
- Managing agency: Mid-Coast Council
- Max. length: 25 kilometres (16 mi)
- Max. width: 9 kilometres (5.6 mi)
- Surface area: 98.7 square kilometres (38.1 sq mi)
- Average depth: 2.3 metres (7 ft 7 in)
- Water volume: 217,951.5 megalitres (7,696.88×10^{6} cu ft)
- Surface elevation: 0 m (0 ft)
- Islands: Hadleys Island, Wallis Island
- Settlements: Coomba Park, Forster, Green Point, Pacific Palms, Tuncurry
- Website: NSW Environment & Heritage webpage

Wallis Lake, an open and trained wave dominated barrier estuary, is located within the Mid-Coast Council local government area in the Mid North Coast region of New South Wales, Australia. Wallis Lake is located adjacent to the towns of Forster and Tuncurry, and adjacent to the east coast, about 308 kilometres (191 mi) north of Sydney.

== Features and location ==
Drawing its catchment from within Wallingat National Park and the Wallamba River, Coolongolook River, and Pipers Creek, Wallis Lake has a catchment area of 1,197 square kilometres (462 sq mi) and a surface area of 99 square kilometres (38 sq mi). When full, Wallis Lake covers an area of around 10,000 hectares (25,000 acres), is approximately 25 kilometres (16 mi) long, with a width of 9 kilometres (5.6 mi).

Hadleys Island lies within Wallis Lake, near the confluence of the Wallamba and Coolongolook rivers.

The waterways surrounding Wallis Lake are well known for oyster production.

Lake Wallis was named in honour of James Wallis, an officer of the 46th Regiment.

== See also ==
- Wallis Island, New South Wales
- List of lakes of Australia
