= Tuncurry, New South Wales =

Town in New South Wales, Australia

Tuncurry
- Town
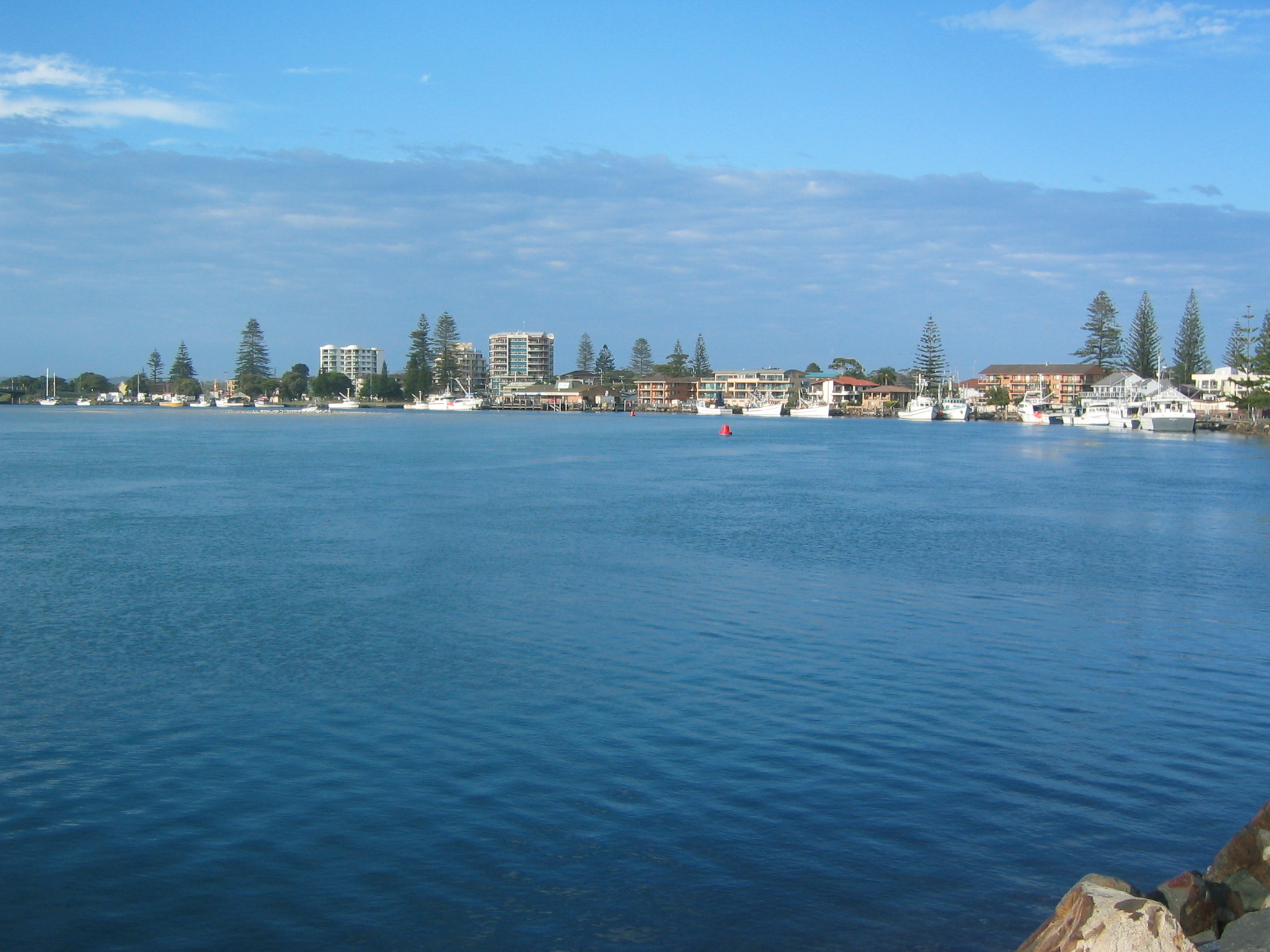
- View from Tuncurry's netted 'Rockpool' beach

- Coordinates: 32°10′30″S 152°29′56″E
- Country: Australia
- State: New South Wales
- Region: Mid North Coast
- LGA: Mid-Coast Council
- Location: 307 km (191 mi) NNE of Sydney; 165 km (103 mi) NNE of Newcastle; 631 km (392 mi) S of Brisbane; 35 km (22 mi) S of Taree; 63 km (39 mi) NE of Bulahdelah

Government
  - State electorate: Myall Lakes
  - Federal division: Lyne
- Elevation: 6 m (20 ft)

Population
  - Total: 6,376 (2021 census)
- Time zone: UTC+10 (AEST)
  - Summer (DST): UTC+11 (AEDT)
- Postcode: 2428
Localities around Tuncurry
| Failford | Darawank | Tasman Sea |
| Nabiac | Tuncurry | Tasman Sea |
| Wallis Island | Forster | Forster |

Tuncurry is a coastal town in the Mid North Coast region of New South Wales, Australia, in the Mid-Coast Council LGA, about 307 km (191 mi) north north east of Sydney. It is immediately adjacent to its twin town of Forster, which is the larger of the two towns.

== History ==
In 1875, John Wright was the first white settler in Tuncurry. The first land grant in this area was in 1875. The settlement was originally called North Shore and then North Forster and was renamed Tuncurry meaning "plenty of fish" in 1891 and then proclaimed a village in 1893.

The area was well known in the early days for its timber cutting and sawmills. Timber was collected from the lakes and rivers by the logpunts (droghers).

A bridge over the Coolongolook River that marks the entrance to Wallis Lake was built in 1959 linking Forster and Tuncurry and replacing the punt service that had operated since 1890.

== Demographics ==
The 2021 Census by the Australian Bureau of Statistics counted 6,376 people in Tuncurry on census night. Of these, 47% were male and 53% were female.

The majority of residents (83.5%) are of Australian birth, with other common census responses being England (3.6%), New Zealand (0.9%) and Scotland (0.5%).

The age distribution of Tuncurry is skewed higher than the greater Australian population. 83% of residents were over 25 years in 2021, compared to the Australian average of 69.8% and 17% were younger than 25 years, compared to the Australian average of 30.2%.

== Tourism ==
Because of its relatively close driving proximity to Sydney, Forster–Tuncurry has established itself as a popular summer holiday destination, where in the hotter months, the population swells considerably. The school holidays in the colder months also bring large numbers of holidaymakers.

Tuncurry's Nine Mile Beach is a popular swimming, surfing and fishing spot. Tuncurry Rockpool is a netted swimming enclosure, formed by breakwalls which mark the entrance to Wallis Lake. Tuncurry's lakefront areas are characterised by wharves and jetties which provide mooring for fishing boats and pleasure craft.

== Sporting clubs ==
- The Tuncurry Golf Course is part of the Forster Tuncurry Golf Club
- The Tuncurry Forster Football Club is a soccer club home to the Tuncurry Tigers
- The Forster Tuncurry Rugby League Football Club is home to the Forster Tuncurry Hawkes
- The Tuncurry Forster Jockey Club has regular horse racing events
- The Forster Tuncury Touch Association offers touch football for all levels
- The Tuncurry Beach Bowling Club offers lawn bowling to the area

== Gallery ==
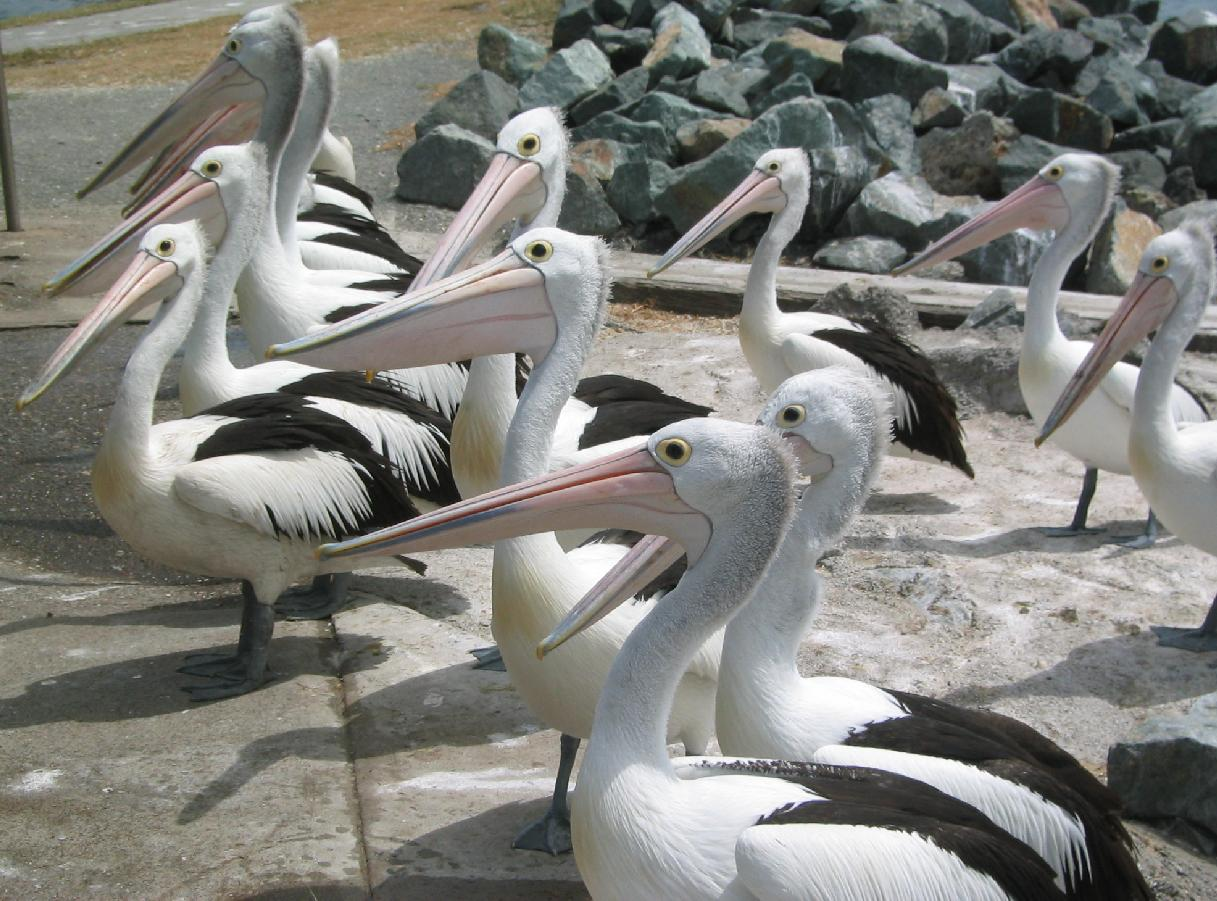
Pelican gather at the public boat ramp in Tuncurry

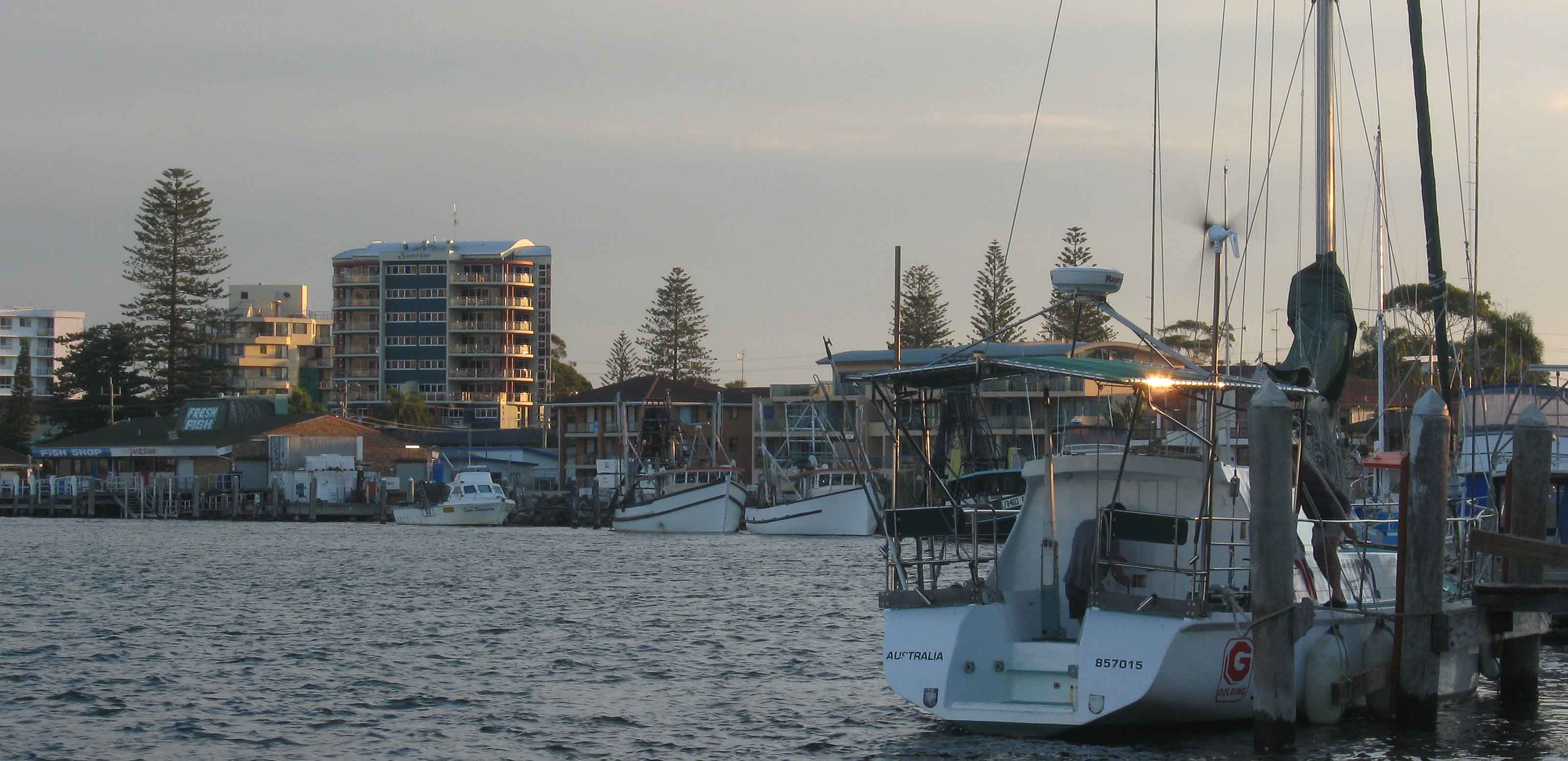
Fishing vessels moored at Tuncurry

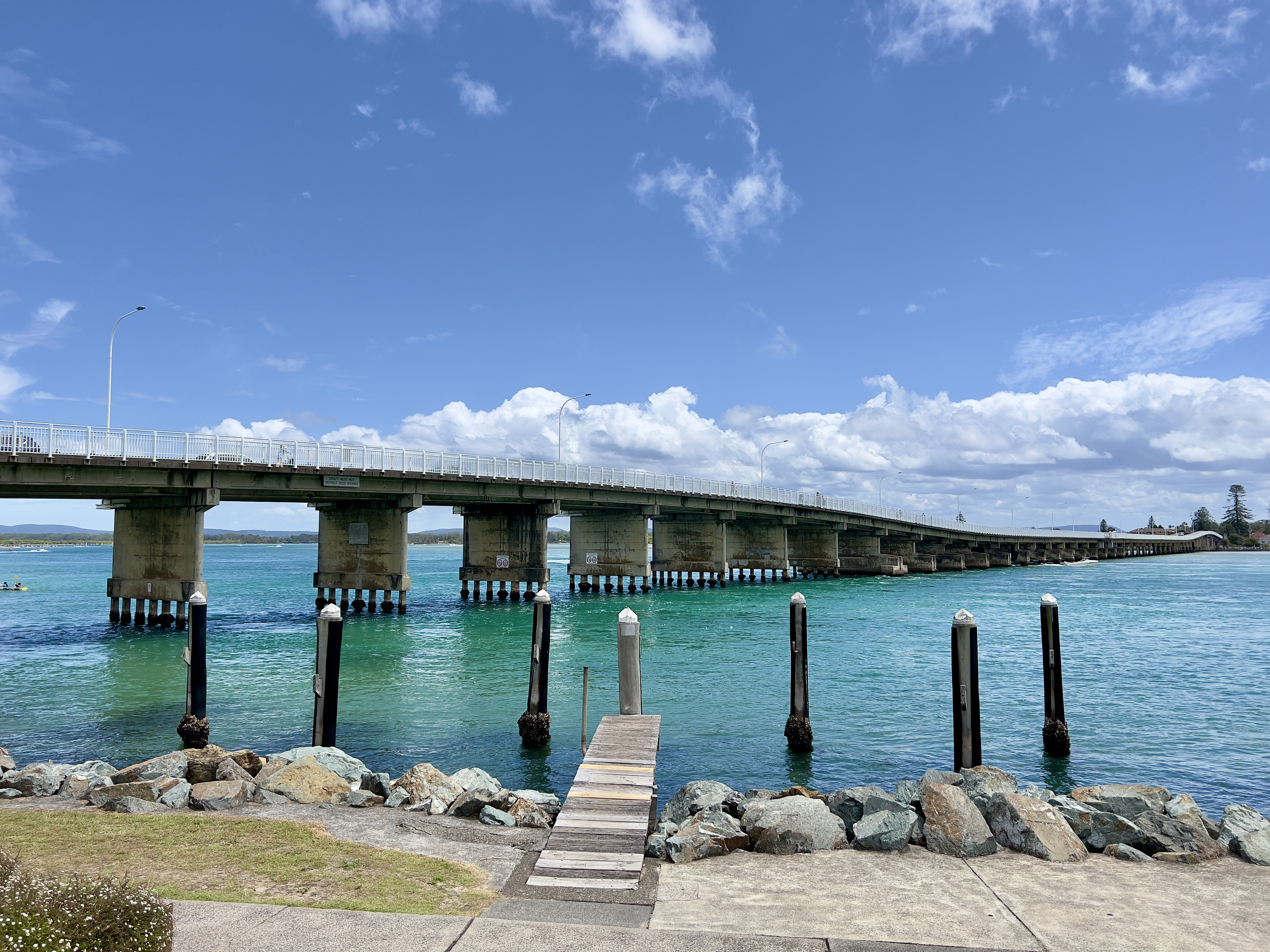
View of bridge connecting Forster to Tuncurry.

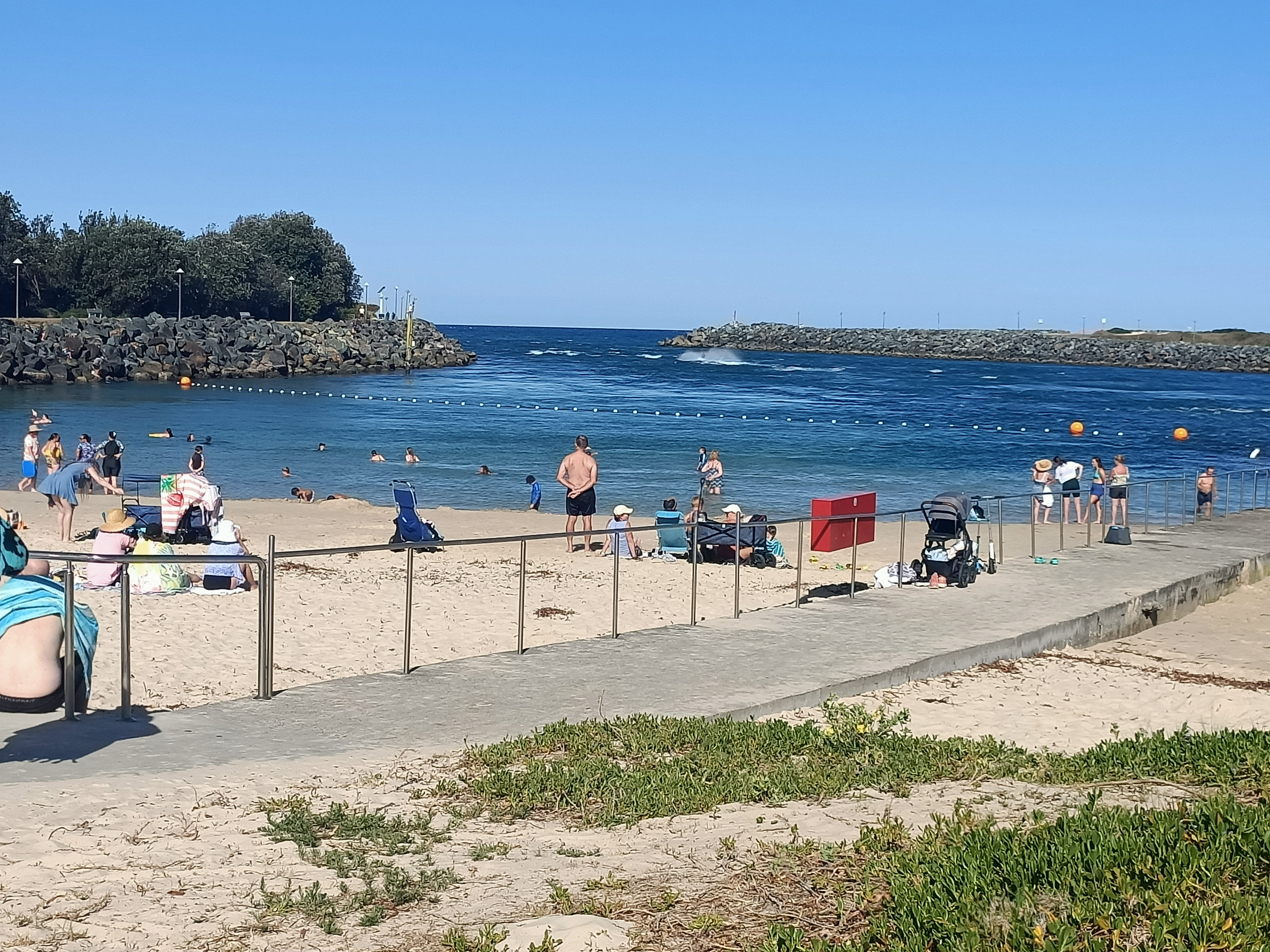
Tuncurry Rock Pool during a busy sunny day

== See also ==
- Wallamba River
