= Coolongolook River =

River in New South Wales, Australia

Coordinates: 32°11′S 152°21′E

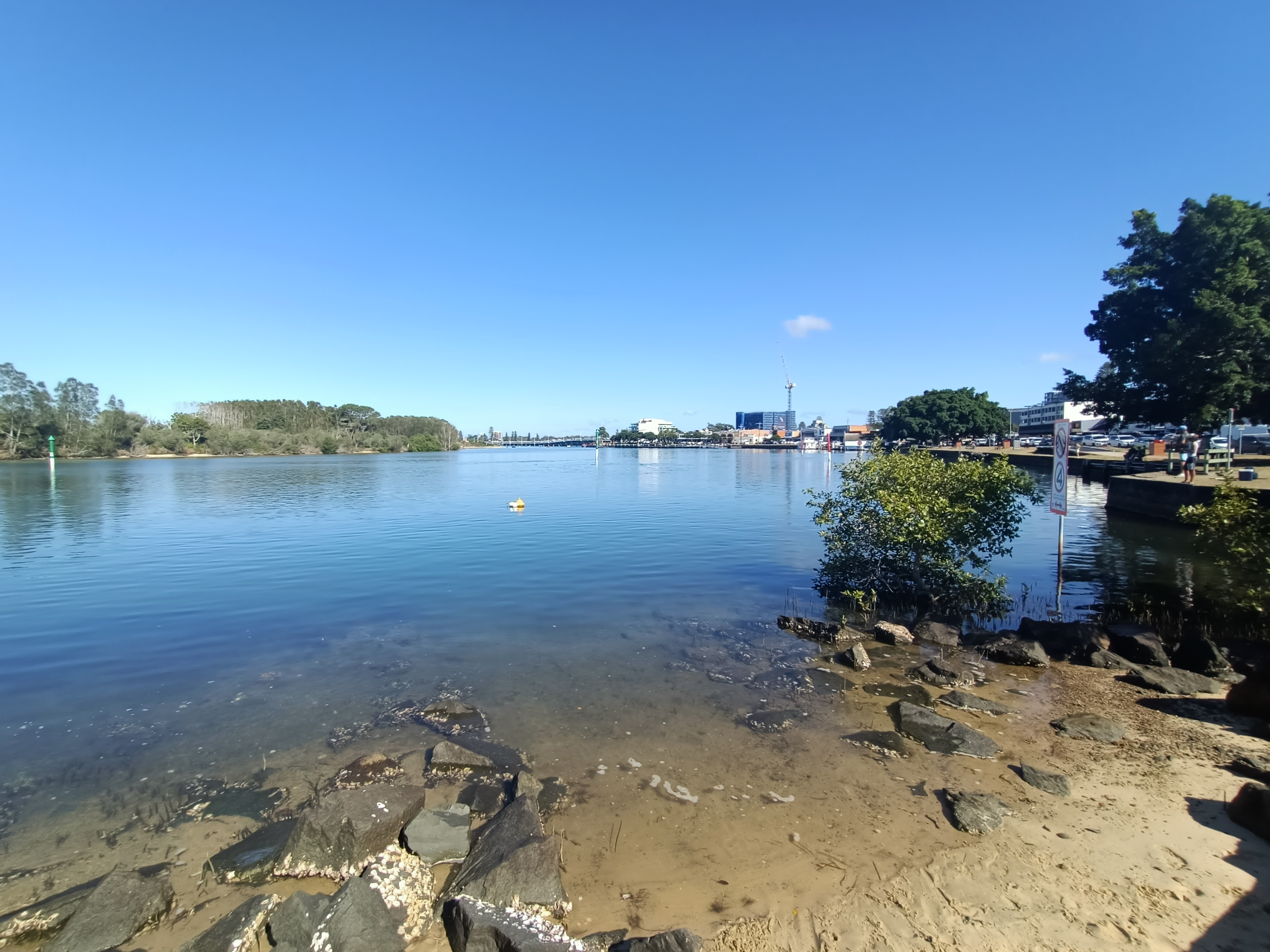
- Coolongolook River, as seen from Forster

Location
- Country: Australia
- State: New South Wales
- IBRA: NSW North Coast
- District: Mid North Coast
- Local government area: Mid-Coast Council

Physical characteristics
- Source: Mount Chapman, Koolonock Range
  - location: near Wootton
  - elevation: 173 m (568 ft)
- Mouth: Wallis Lake
  - location: near Forster and Tuncurry
  - elevation: 0 m (0 ft)
- Length: 47 km (29 mi)

Basin features
- River system: Mid-Coast Council
- Tributaries
  - left: Wallamba River
  - right: Wallingat River

Coolongolook River, a watercourse of the Mid-Coast Council system, is located in the Mid North Coast district of New South Wales, Australia.

== Course and features ==
Coolongolook River rises on the northern slopes below Mount Chapman within the Koolonock Range, near Wootton, and flows generally north and north northeast, joined by the Wallamba and Wallingat rivers, before reaching its confluence with Wallis Lake, descending 176 metres (577 ft) over its 47 kilometres (29 mi) course.

== See also ==
- Rivers of New South Wales
- List of rivers of New South Wales (A–K)
- List of rivers of Australia
