= Forster, New South Wales =

Forster
- Town
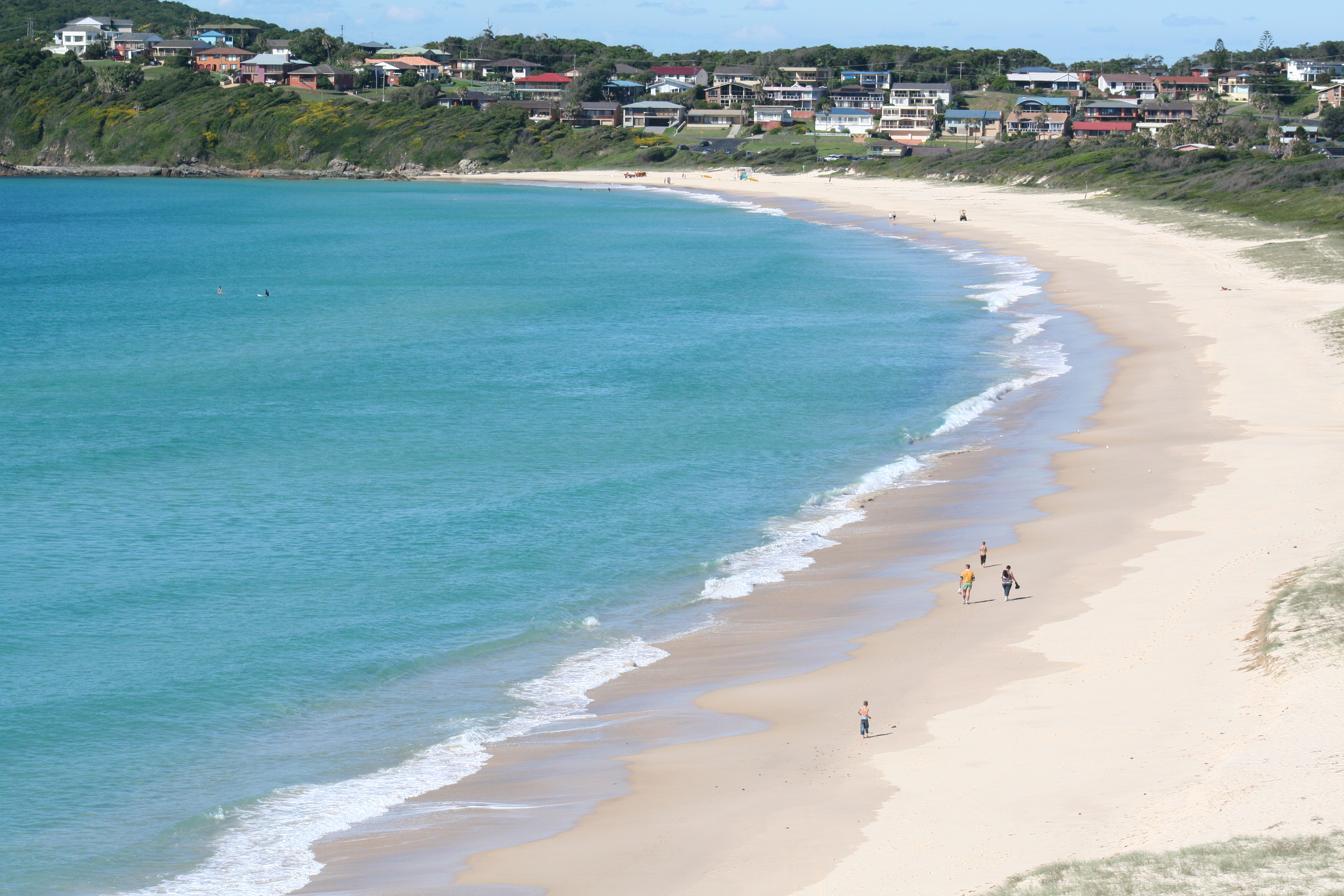
- One Mile Beach, Forster c. 2014

- Coordinates: 32°10′50″S 152°30′42″E
- Country: Australia
- State: New South Wales
- Region: Mid North Coast
- LGA: Mid-Coast Council
- Location: 308 km (191 mi) NNE of Sydney; 166 km (103 mi) NNE of Newcastle; 633 km (393 mi) S of Brisbane; 37 km (23 mi) S of Taree; 65 km (40 mi) NE of Bulahdelah

Government
  - State electorate: Myall Lakes
  - Federal division: Lyne
- Elevation: 6 m (20 ft)

Population
  - Total: 14,187 (2021 census)
- Time zone: UTC+10 (AEST)
  - Summer (DST): UTC+11 (AEDT)
- Postcode: 2428
- County: Gloucester
Localities around Forster
Tuncurry	Tuncurry	Tasman Sea
Wallis Island	Forster	Tasman Sea
Coomba Park	Green Point	Tasman Sea

Forster (/ˈfɒrstər/ FOR-stər) is a coastal town in the Mid North Coast region of New South Wales, on country of the Worimi People, Australia, in the Mid-Coast Council LGA, about 308 km north-north-east of Sydney. It is immediately adjacent to its twin, Tuncurry, which is the smaller of the two towns. Forster is known for its beaches, scenic waterways, and natural beauty, including Wallis Lake and the surrounding Great Lakes region.

== History ==
In the early colonial period, the British called the area Cape Hawke Harbour after nearby Cape Hawke which was named by Captain Cook in 1770.

Explorer and government surveyor, John Oxley, travelled through the region in 1818 encountering around 70 people of the resident Tobwabba clan of Worimi people at what is now Forster. One of Oxley's party was speared in attempting to cut down a cabbage tree palm. In the 1820s, Tobwabba people at Cape Hawke were rewarded for capturing runaway prisoners from the Port Macquarie convict settlement.

A permanent timber industry was established at Cape Hawke Harbour by the 1850s led by experienced timber-getters such as John Pennington. The area became well known for its timber cutting, sawmills and shipbuilding. Timber was collected from the lakes and rivers by logpunts (droghers).

The village of Forster was established at the site in the early 1870s, named after the colonial pastoralist, William Forster, who owned a timber reserve in the region. He was also the fourth Premier of New South Wales and later served as Agent-General in London.

The first post office in Forster opened on 1 October 1872, with John Wyllie Breckenridge (a prominent local sawmill and ship-building owner and a forebear of Georgie Parker) as postmaster at a salary of £10 a year.

A bridge over the Coolongolook River that marks the entrance to Wallis Lake was built in 1959 linking Forster and Tuncurry and replacing the punt service that had operated since 1890.

== Demographics ==
According to the 2021 census of Population, there were 14,187 people in Forster.

- Aboriginal and Torres Strait Islander people made up 6.3% of the population.
- 81.8% of people were born in Australia. The next most common countries of birth were England (with 3.2%) and New Zealand (with 1.2%).
- 90.1% of people spoke only English at home.
- The most common responses for religion were No Religion (with 34.7%), Anglican (with 22.7%) and Catholic (with 20.2%).

== Tourism ==
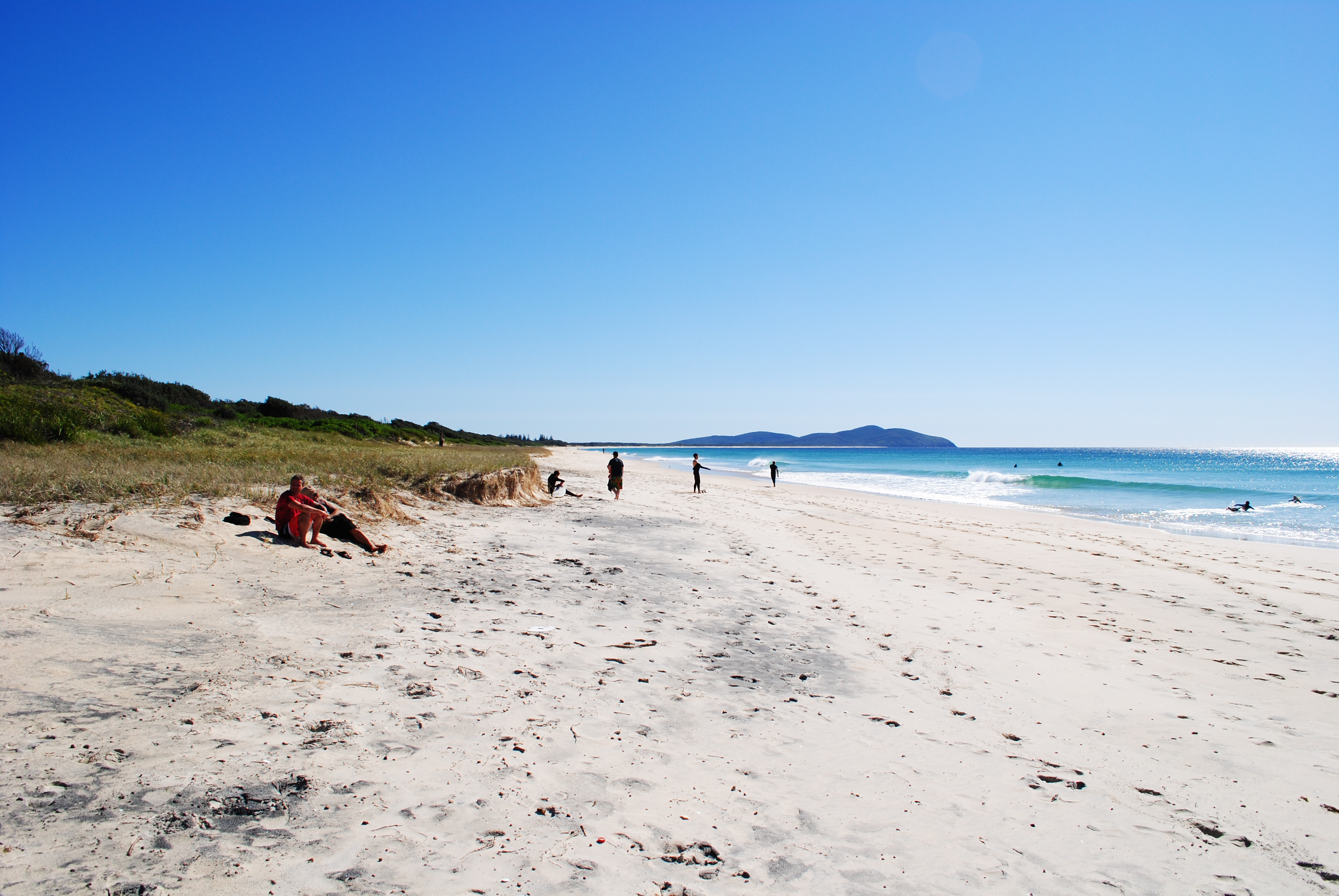
Forster's Seven Mile Beach

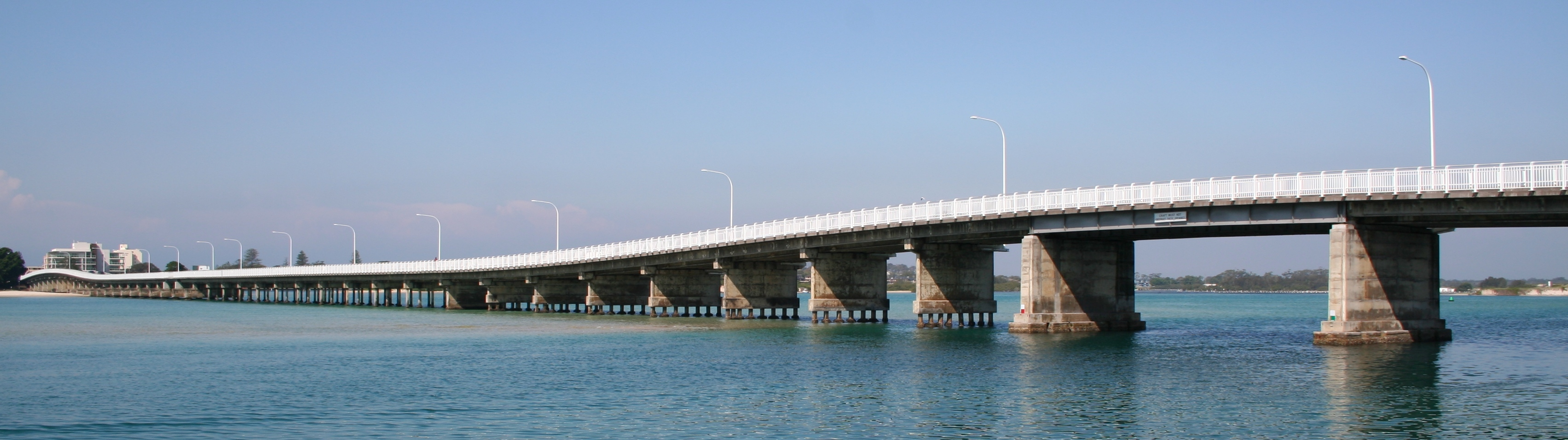
Forster–Tuncurry Bridge

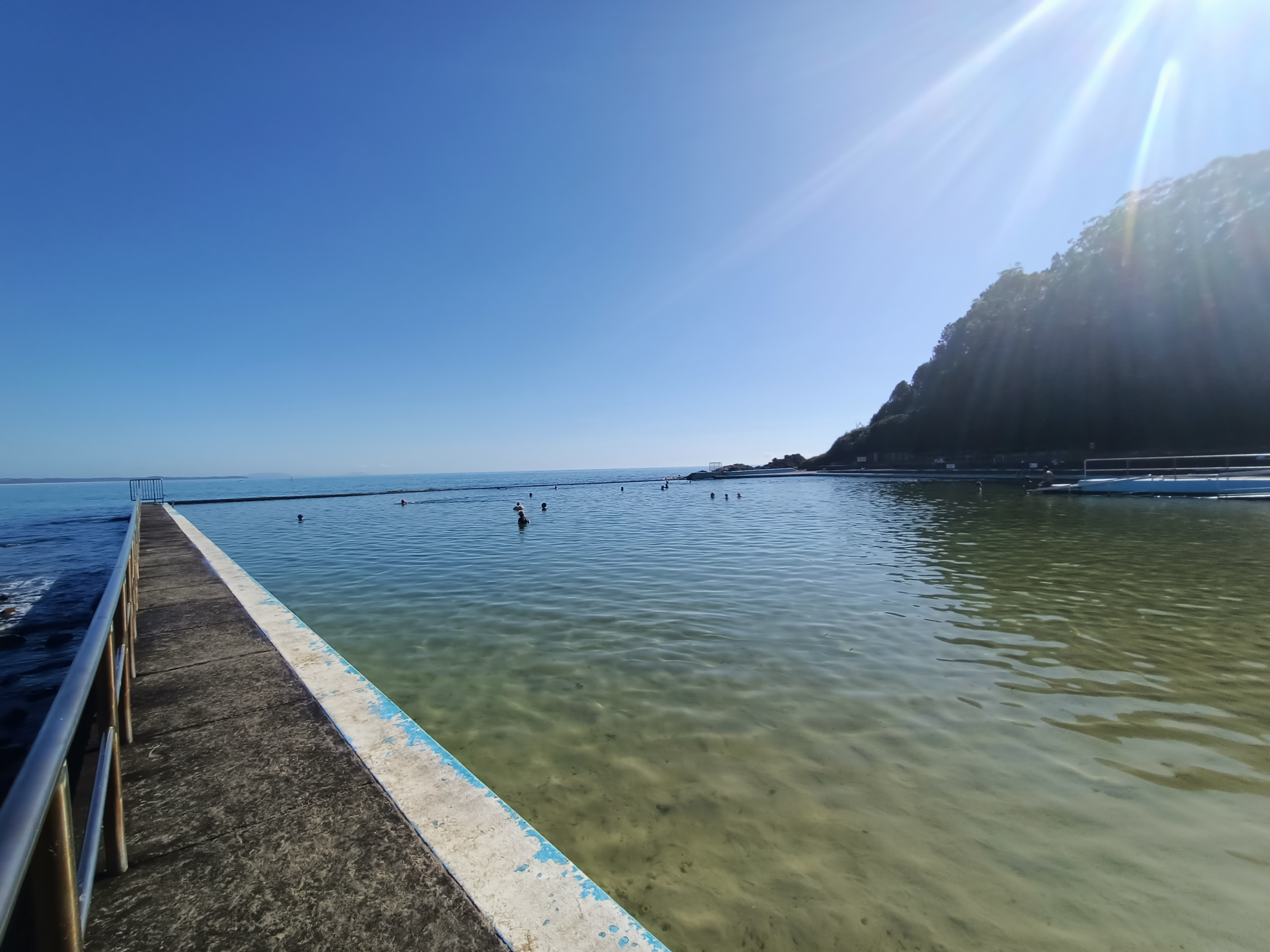
Forster Ocean Baths

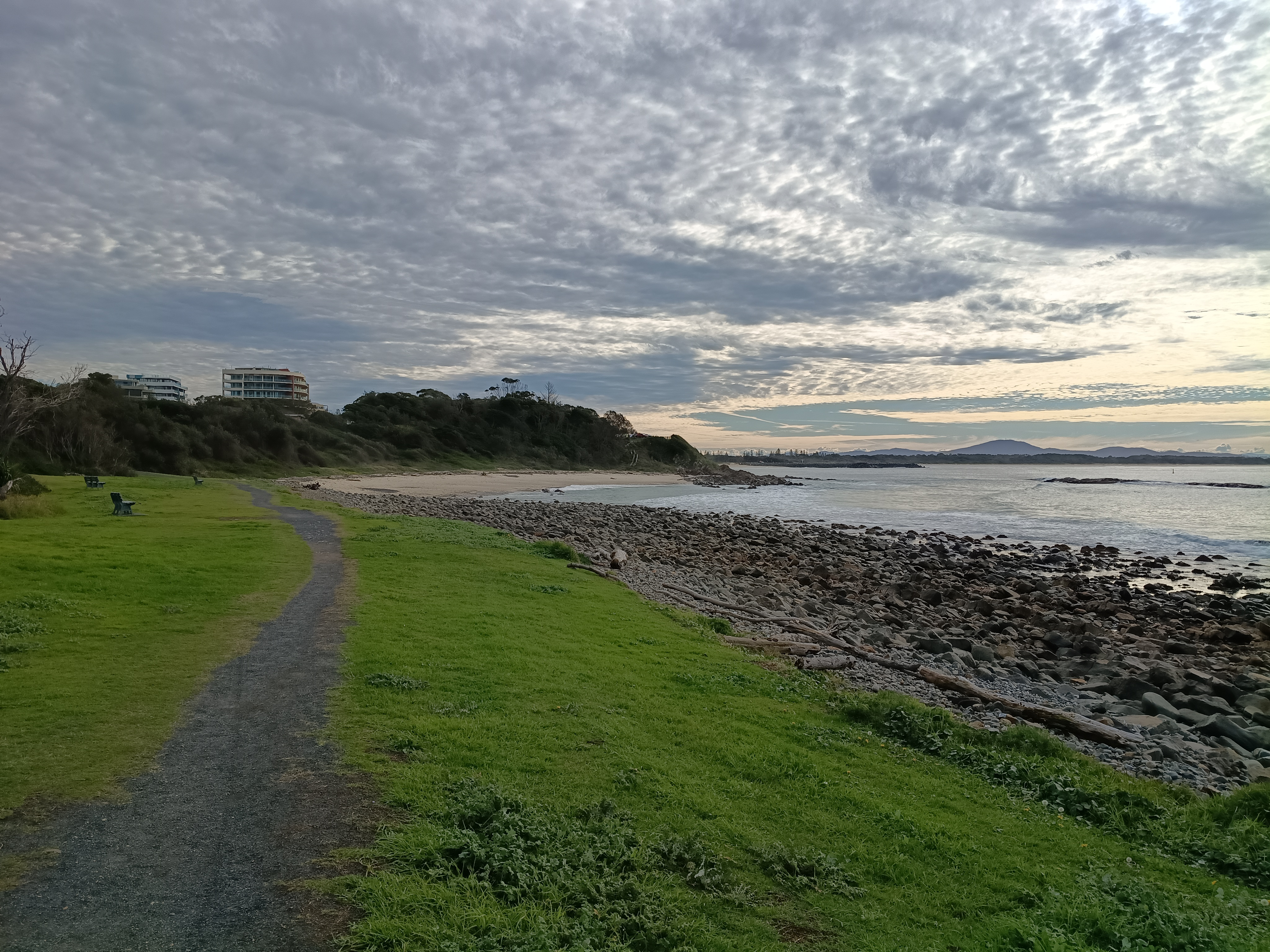
Walking track overlooking Pebbly Beach

Because of its close proximity to Sydney, just under 4 hours drive, Forster–Tuncurry has established itself as a popular summer holiday destination; in the hotter months the population increases considerably. Due to this most of its shops and restaurants work on seasonal income, with some opening in the summer months exclusively.

The school holidays in the colder months also bring a considerable number of holidaymakers. Forster-Tuncurry is predominantly a family holiday location with large lakes and white sandy beaches. Notable nearby attractions the Bicentennial Trail, Cape Hawke, and Booti Booti National Park.

The most popular beaches are Forster Main Beach, Burgess Beach, and One Mile Beach, serviced by Forster and Cape Hawke Surf Lifesaving Clubs respectively. One Mile Beach, Pebbly Beach and Tuncurry Beach are popular with local surfers. Forster's ocean pool and the Tuncurry rock pool are very popular destinations for those with families.

== Climate ==
Forster experiences a humid subtropical climate (Köppen: Cfa); with warm summers and mild winters; and with a moderately high precipitation amount of 1,176.4 millimetres (47.99 in). The highest temperature recorded at Forster was 43.0 °C (109.4 °F) on 1 December 2004; the lowest recorded was 1.0 °C (33.8 °F) on 29 May 2019. On average, it has 124.5 clear days annually.

Climate data for Forster (1999–2020 means, extremes 1896–2023)
Month	Jan	Feb	Mar	Apr	May	Jun	Jul	Aug	Sep	Oct	Nov	Dec	Year
Record high °C (°F)	41.0 (105.8)	38.0 (100.4)	33.5 (92.3)	33.0 (91.4)	28.2 (82.8)	26.4 (79.5)	25.5 (77.9)	30.0 (86.0)	39.1 (102.4)	37.0 (98.6)	36.0 (96.8)	43.0 (109.4)	43.0 (109.4)
Mean daily maximum °C (°F)	26.6 (79.9)	26.5 (79.7)	25.6 (78.1)	23.9 (75.0)	21.3 (70.3)	18.9 (66.0)	18.4 (65.1)	19.5 (67.1)	21.6 (70.9)	22.8 (73.0)	23.9 (75.0)	25.5 (77.9)	22.9 (73.2)
Mean daily minimum °C (°F)	19.7 (67.5)	19.5 (67.1)	17.9 (64.2)	15.2 (59.4)	12.0 (53.6)	10.0 (50.0)	8.7 (47.7)	9.2 (48.6)	11.8 (53.2)	14.0 (57.2)	16.4 (61.5)	18.1 (64.6)	14.4 (57.9)
Record low °C (°F)	12.0 (53.6)	14.0 (57.2)	11.5 (52.7)	6.6 (43.9)	1.0 (33.8)	3.9 (39.0)	2.5 (36.5)	2.0 (35.6)	4.7 (40.5)	5.6 (42.1)	9.0 (48.2)	10.0 (50.0)	1.0 (33.8)
Average rainfall mm (inches)	104.7 (4.12)	121.1 (4.77)	146.6 (5.77)	101.8 (4.01)	110.2 (4.34)	118.6 (4.67)	74.6 (2.94)	58.1 (2.29)	58.0 (2.28)	77.1 (3.04)	115.4 (4.54)	86.4 (3.40)	1,176.4 (46.31)
Average precipitation days	11.0	11.1	13.0	12.2	12.1	12.2	10.2	8.6	9.0	10.3	12.3	11.6	133.6
Average relative humidity (%)	73	74	70	69	64	68	63	59	64	68	72	72	68
Source 1: Bureau of Meteorology, Forster-Tuncurry Marine Rescue (1991–2020)
Source 2: Bureau of Meteorology, Forster-Tuncurry Marine Rescue (all years)

== Clubs ==
Forster has a range of sporting clubs in the area.

- Forster Bodyboarding Club
- Cape Hawke Surf Club
- Pacific Palms Surf Life Saving Club
- Black Head Surf Life Saving Club
- Forster-Tuncurry Hawks Rugby League Club
- Great Lakes United Football Club

== Notable people ==
- Bruce Cowan – Australian politician
- Courtney Houssos – New South Wales politician
- Jamal Idris – former rugby league player
- Ben Jeffries – former rugby league player
- Adam Pearce – football player
- Scott Hill – rugby league player
- Luke Ricketson – former rugby league player was born in Forster before moving to Sydney as a young child
- Jack River – musician
