= Wallamba River =

River in New South Wales, Australia

Coordinates: 32°09′S 152°29′E

Wallamba River Raikes River, Browns Creek, Wollamba River, Wollomba River, Wollumba River
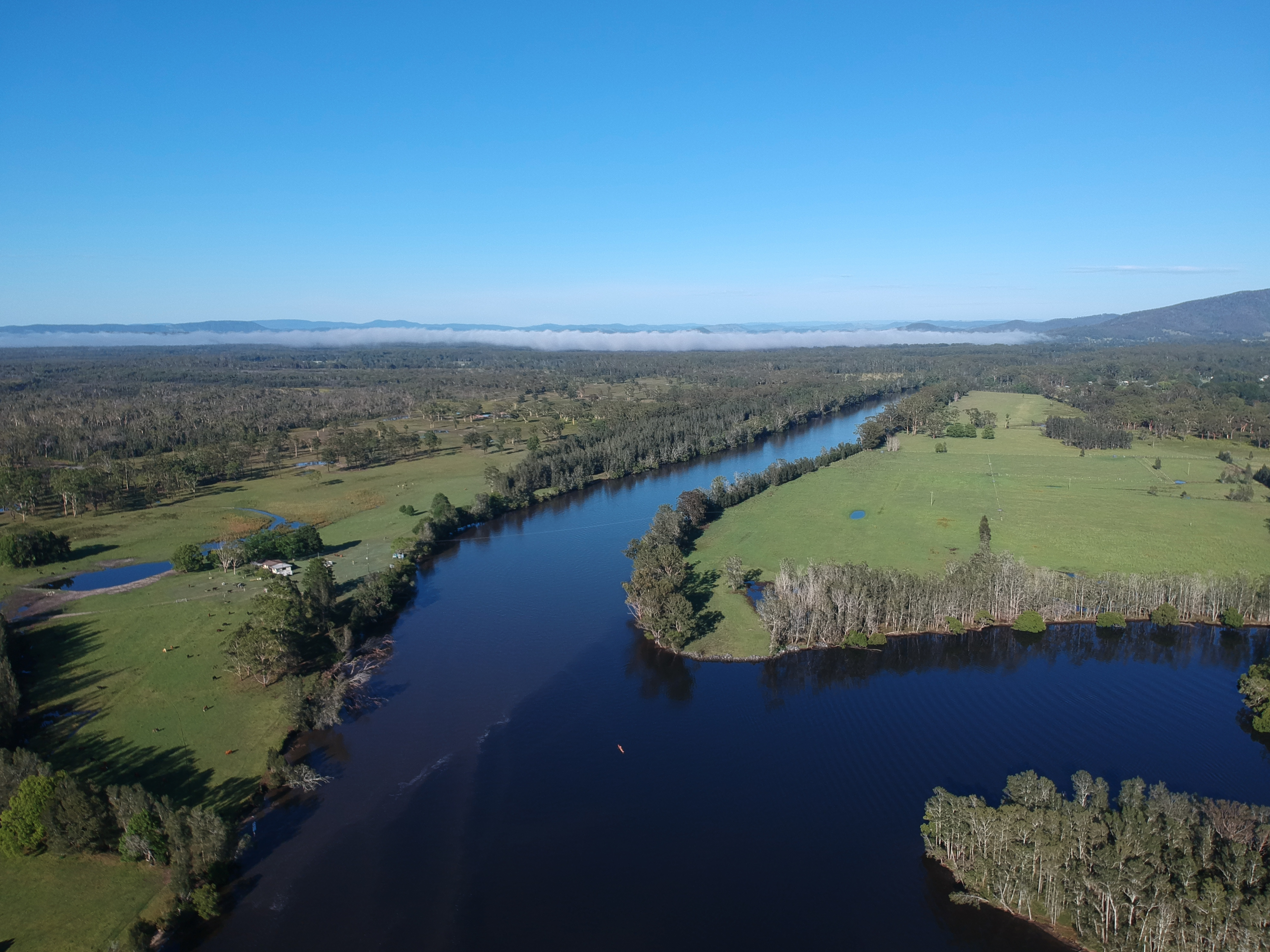

Location
- Country: Australia
- State: New South Wales
- IBRA: NSW North Coast
- District: Mid North Coast
- Local government areas: Mid-Coast Council

Physical characteristics
- Source: Kyle Range
  - location: near Gangat
  - elevation: 271 m (889 ft)
- Mouth: confluence with the Coolongolook River at Wallis Lake
  - location: near Tuncurry
  - elevation: 0 m (0 ft)
- Length: 72 km (45 mi)

Basin features
- River system: Mid-Coast Council
- Tributaries
  - left: Firefly Creek, Bungwahl Creek, Candoormakh Creek
  - right: Kundle Creek, Waterloo Creek (New South Wales)

Wallamba River, a watercourse of the Mid-Coast Council system, is located in the Mid North Coast district of New South Wales, Australia.

== Course and features ==
Wallamba River rises on the northern slopes of Kyle Range, near the locality of Gangat. The river generally flows east and then south, joined by five minor tributaries, before reaching its confluence with the Coolongolook River at Wallis Lake, descending 271 metres (889 ft) over its 72 kilometres (45 mi) course.

The river is transversed by the Pacific Highway south of Nabiac.

At one stage, a riverboat milk pick-up service operated for the dairy farmers who farmed along the banks of the river. This service was discontinued in the mid-1970s due to economic reasons. Road milk tankers were then used to pick up from the farms.

Water skiing and fishing is popular along the Wallamba.

== See also ==
- Rivers of New South Wales
- List of rivers in New South Wales (L-Z)
- List of rivers of Australia
