= List of rivers of Australia =

Major rivers of Australia

Rivers are ordered alphabetically, by state. The same river may be found in more than one state as many rivers cross state borders.

== Longest rivers nationally ==
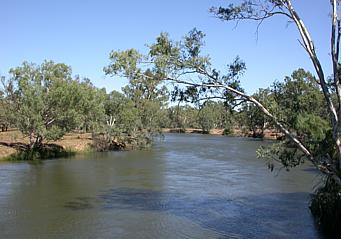
A branch of the Murray River, near Howlong, New South Wales.

Longest rivers in Australia by length (June 2014)
Order	River name	System	Length		Source
Order	River name	System	km	miles	Source
1	Murray River	Murray-Darling	2,508	1,558	
2	Darling River	Murray-Darling	1,545	960	
3	Murrumbidgee River	Murray-Darling	1,485	923	
4	Lachlan River	Murray-Darling	1,339	832	
5	Cooper Creek	Lake Eyre	1,113	692	
6	Flinders River	Carpentaria Coast	1,004	624	
7	Diamantina River	Lake Eyre	941	585	

== Longest river by state or territory ==
Although the Murray River forms much of the border separating New South Wales and Victoria, it is not Victoria's longest river because the New South Wales border is delineated by the river's southern bank rather than by the middle of the river. The only section of the river formally within Victoria is a stretch of approximately 11 kilometres (7 mi) where it separates Victoria and South Australia. At this point, the middle of the river forms the border.

Longest rivers in each state or territory (December 2012)
State/territory	River name	Length		Source
State/territory	River name	km	miles	Source
Australian Capital Territory	Murrumbidgee River	59	37	
New South Wales	Murray River	1,808	1,123	
Northern Territory	Victoria River	510	317	
Queensland	Flinders River	1,004	624	
South Australia	Murray River	700	435	
Tasmania	South Esk River	245	152	
Victoria	Goulburn River	654	406	
Western Australia	Gascoyne River	834	518	

== Rivers by state or territory ==
The following is a list of rivers located within Australian states and territories. Where a river crosses a state or territory boundary, it is listed in both states and territories. Where a river has a name that includes the word creek, it has been officially designated as a river.

=== Australian Capital Territory ===
- Rivers of the Australian Capital Territory template
- Blue Gum
- Cotter
- Gibraltar
- Ginninderra
- Gudgenby
- Jerrabomberra
- Molonglo
- Murrumbidgee
- Naas
- Orroral
- Paddys
- Punchbowl
- Queanbeyan
- Sullivans
- Tuggeranong

=== New South Wales ===
The Geographical Names Board of New South Wales lists 439 rivers in the Geographical Names Register. In the following list, where there are duplicated names, the source local government area (LGA) is identified. In the event of there being two rivers of the same name within the same local government area, additional referencing is provided. Rivers of New South Wales lists all rivers below, grouped according to whether the river flows towards the coast or flow inland, and grouped according to their respective catchment and sub-catchment. Where shown in italics, the watercourse is a creek, rivulet, brook, or similar.

- Rivers of New South Wales template
- Waterways of Sydney template

A

- Abercrombie
- Aberfoyle
- Abington
- Adelong
- Adjungbilly
- Allyn
- Apsley
- Araluen
- Avon (source in Wollongong LGA)
- Avon (source in Mid-Coast Council LGA)

B

- Back (source in Richmond Valley LGA)
- Back (source in Cooma-Monaro LGA)
- Back (source in Tamworth Regional LGA)
- Baerami
- Bakers
- Balgalal
- Bangalow
- Barcoongere
- Bargo
- Barigan
- Barmedman
- Barnard
- Barrington
- Barwon
- Beardy
- Beardy Waters
- Beaury
- Bedford
- Bega
- Bell
- Bellinger
- Belubula
- Bemboka
- Bendoc
- Berkeley
- Bermagui
- Berthong
- Bettowynd
- Bielsdown
- Big Badja
- Billabong
- Bimberamala
- Birrie
- Blackwater
- Blakney
- Bland
- Blicks
- Blue Mountain
- Bluff
- Bobin
- Bobo
- Bogan
- Bokhara
- Bolong
- Bombala
- Boomi
- Boonoo Boonoo
- Boorowa
- Boundary (source in Clarence Valley LGA, a tributary of the Glen Fernaigh River)
- Boundary (source in Clarence Valley LGA, a tributary of the Nymboida River)
- Bow
- Bowman
- Bowning
- Boyd
- Bredbo
- Brogo
- Brunswick
- Buckenbowra
- Budgewoi
- Bulla
- Bundock
- Bunnoo
- Burke
- Burkes
- Burns
- Burra (source in Palerang LGA)
- Burra (source in Gundagai LGA)
- Burrungubugge
- Bylong

C

- Cadiangullong
- Camden Haven
- Campbells
- Caparra
- Capertee
- Carole
- Castlereagh
- Cataract (source in Tenterfield LGA)
- Cataract (source in Wollondilly LGA)
- Cattle Creek
- Cedar
- Cedar Brush
- Cedar Party
- Cells
- Chandler
- Chandlers
- Cheshire
- Chichester
- Chittaway
- Christmas
- Clarence
- Clouds
- Clyde
- Cobark
- Cobrabald
- Cockburn
- Coldstream
- Colo
- Commissioners Waters
- Congewai
- Connollys
- Cooba Bulga
- Cooks
- Cooks Vale
- Coolaburragundy
- Coolibah
- Coolongolook
- Coolumbooka
- Cooma Back
- Cooma
- Coopers
- Cooplacurripa
- Coorongooba
- Corang
- Cordeaux
- Corindi
- Cowriga
- Coxs
- Crawford
- Crookwell
- Crudine
- Cudgegong
- Culgoa
- Cullinga
- Cunningham
- Curricabark

D

- Darling
  - Great Darling Anabranch
- Dawson
- Deepwater
- Delegate
- Derringullen
- Deua
- Dilgry
- Dingo
- Doubtful
- Doyles
- Dry
- Du Faur
- Duckmaloi
- Dumaresq
- Dungowan
- Dyke

E

- Eden
- Edward
- Ellenborough
- Emu Swamp
- Endrick
- Erina
- Erskine
- Esk
- Eucumbene
- Evans Plains
- Evans
- Ewenmar

F

- Felled Timber
- Fish
- Flyers
- Forbes
- Frenchmans
- Frazers

G

- Gara
- Geehi
- Genoa
- Georges
- Georges
- Glen Fernaigh
- Gloucester
- Goobarragandra
- Goodradigbee
- Goorudee
- Goulburn
- Grose
- Growee
- Gungarlin
- Gunningbland
- Guy Fawkes
- Gwydir

H

- Hacking
- Halls
- Happy Jacks
- Hastings
- Hawkesbury
- Henry
- Hollanders
- Horsearm
- Horton
- Hunter

I

- Imlay
- Ingeegoodbee
- Isabella
- Isis

J

- Jacobs
- Jeir
- Jenolan
- Jerra Jerra
- Jerrabattgulla
- Jerrara
- Jerrawa
- Jilliby Jilliby
- Jooriland
- Jugiong

K

- Kalang
- Kanangra
- Kangaroo (source in Clarence Valley LGA)
- Kangaroo (source in Shoalhaven LGA)
- Karuah
- Kedumba
- Kerripit
- Kincumber
- Kindra
- Kowmung
- Krui
- Kunderang
- Kybeyan

L

- Lachlan
- Lane Cove
- Lansdowne
- Lee
- Leycester
- Little Jilliby Jilliby
- Little Murray
- Little Nymboida
- Little Plains
- Little (source in Wollondilly LGA)
- Little (source in Dubbo LGA)
- Little (source in Oberon LGA)
- Little (source in Wingecarribee LGA)
- Little Run
- Little Weir
- Lennox River (proposed name)

M

- Macdonald (source in Tamworth LGA)
- Macdonald (source in Singleton LGA)
- Macintyre
- Maclaughlin
- Macleay
- Macquarie
- Macquarie
- Maddens
- Mammy Johnsons
- Mangrove
- Mann
- Manning
- Maria
- Maryland
- Medway
- Mehi
- Meroo
- Merrica
- Merriwa
- Middle
- Minnamurra
- Mirrool
- Mogo
- Mole
- Molonglo
- Mongarlowe
- Moonan
- Mooney Mooney
- Mooki
- Mooni
- Moppy
- Moredun
- Moruya
- Mowamba
- Mulga
- Mulla Mulla
- Mulwaree
- Mummel
- Munmurra
- Murrah
- Murray
- Murruin
- Murrumbidgee
- Myall

N

- Nadgee
- Nadgigomar
- Nambucca
- Namoi
- Nangahrah
- Narara
- Narran
- Nattai
- Nepean
- Never Never
- Niemur
- Nowendoc
- Nowlands
- Nullica
- Numeralla
- Nunnock
- Nymboida

O

- Oaky
- Oban
- O'Briens
- Orara
- Ourimbah
- Oxley

P

- Paddys (source in Wingecarribee LGA)
- Paddys (source in Tumbarumba LGA)
- Pages
- Pages
- Pambula
- Pappinbarra
- Parma
- Paroo
- Parramatta
- Paterson
- Peak
- Peel (A Section Of)
- Peel
- Peelwood
- Phils
- Pigna Barney
- Pinch
- Pinchgut
- Pipers Creek
- Porters
- Pudman

Q

- Queanbeyan
- Queen Charlottes
- Queens Pound
- Queensborough
- Quegobla
- Quirindi

R

- Ralfes
- Reedy
- Retreat
- Richmond
- River Lett
- Rock Flat
- Rocky Ponds
- Rocky
- Rosewood
- Rouchel
- Rous
- Rowleys
- Rufus
- Rush

S

- Sandon
- Sandy (source in Bland LGA)
- Sandy (source in Cobar LGA)
- Sandy (source in Richmond Valley LGA)
- Sandy (source in Tamworth Regional LGA)
- Sara
- Severn
- Sewells
- Shannon
- Shoalhaven
- Snowy
- Spring
- Stewarts
- Stewarts
- Strike-a-Light
- Styx
- Summer Hill
- Swampy Plain

T

- Tabulam
- Talbragar
- Tallawudjah
- Tallowa
- Tarcutta
- Tarlo
- Tarrion
- Taylors Arm
- Telegherry
- Terania
- The Big Warrambool
- The Branch
- Thompsons
- Thone
- Thredbo
- Tia
- Tilbuster
- Timbarra
- Tindarey
- Tobins
- Tomaga
- Tonalli
- Tooloom
- Tooma
- Towallum
- Towamba
- Trigalong
- Tuggerah
- Tuglow
- Tumbi Umbi
- Tumut
- Turners
- Turon
- Tuross
- Tweed

U

- Undowah
- Upsalls
- Urumbilum

W

- Wadbilliga
- Wah Way
- Walcrow
- Wallagaraugh
- Wallamba
- Wallarah
- Wallingat
- Wang Wauk
- Wangat
- Warbro
- Wards
- Warialda
- Warnes
- Warragamba
- Warrego
- Warrell
- Watagan
- Webbs
- Werong
- Werriberri
- Wheeny
- Wheeo
- Whitbarrow
- White Rock
- Widden
- Wild Cattle
- Williams
- Williwa
- Wilson
- Wilsons
- Winburndale
- Wingecarribee
- Wingello
- Wog Wog
- Wolgan
- Wollangambe
- Wollemi
- Wollombi
- Wollomombi
- Wollondilly
- Wonboyn
- Wooli Wooli
- Worondi
- Woronora
- Wyoming
- Wyong

Y

- Yadboro
- Yancowinna
- Yanda
- Yango
- Yarrabandai
- Yarramanbah
- Yarrangobilly
- Yarrow
- Yarrowitch
- Yarrunga
- Yass
- Yowaka
- Yowrie

=== Northern Territory ===
- Rivers of the Northern Territory template
- Adelaide
- Alligator Rivers
  - East Alligator
  - South Alligator
  - West Alligator
- Buckingham
- Blackmore
- Blyth
- Calvert
- Daly
- Douglas
- Dry
- Elizabeth
- Finke
- Fish
- Fitzmaurice
- Georgina
- Goomadeer
- Goromuru
- Goyder
- Gregory
- Hale
- Hay
- Hodgson
- Johnson
- Katherine
- Keep
- King
- Koolatong
- Limmen Bight
- Liverpool
- MacKinley
- Mary
- Moyle
- McArthur
- Negri
- Nicholson
- Palmer
- Playford
- Plenty
- Robinson
- Roper
- Rosie
- Sandover
- Settlement
- Todd
- Towns
- Victoria
- Walker
- Wearyan
- Wickham
- Wildman
- Wilton

=== Queensland ===
- Rivers of Queensland template
- Waterways of Brisbane template

A

- Albert
- Alice
- Annan
- Archer

B

- Baffle
- Balonne
- Banksia
- Barcoo
- Barratta
- Barron
- Barwon
- Basalt
- Belyando
- Black
- Bloomfield
- Bohle
- Boomi
- Bokhara
- Bowen
- Boyne (Central Queensland)
- Boyne (Wide Bay–Burnett)
- Bremer
- Brisbane
- Broken
- Bulimba
- Bungil
- Burdekin
- Burke
- Burnett
- Burrum

C

- Caboolture
- Calliope
- Campaspe
- Carpentier
- Clara
- Cliffdale
- Coen
- Coleman
- Comet
- Condamine
- Connors
- Coomera
- Cooper
- Crystal
- Currumbin
- Culgoa

D

- Daintree
- Dawson
- Dee
- Diamantina
- Don
- Ducie
- Dumaresq

E

- Edward
- Elliott
- Embley
- Endeavour
- Enoggera
- Eprapah
- Esk

F

- Flinders
- Fitzroy

G

- Georgina
- Gilbert-Einasleigh
- Gilliat
- Gregory

H

- Hann
- Haughton
- Herbert
- Holroyd

I

- Isaac
- Isis
- Ithaca

J

- Jackey Jackey
- Jardine
- Jeannie
- Johnstone

K

- Kedron
- Kendall
- Kolan

L

- Langlo
- Laura
- Leichhardt
- Lockhart
- Lockyer
- Loders
- Logan
- Lynd

M

- Mackenzie
- Maranoa
- Maroochy
- Mary
- Mcdonald
- Merivale
- Mission
- Mitchell
- Moggill
- Mooloolah
- Moonie
- Mossman
- Mulgrave

N

- Nerang
- Nicholson
- Nive
- Nogoa
- Norman
- Norman
- Normanby
- Noosa
- North Pine

O

- O'Connell
- Olive
- Oxley

P

- Palmer
- Paroo
- Pascoe
- Pennefather
- Pike
- Pimpama
- Pine
- Pioneer
- Proserpine

R

- Ross
- Russell

S

- Sandover
- Saxby
- Settlement
- Severn
- South Pine
- Staaten
- Stanley
- Stuart
- Stewart
- Styx (East Central Queensland)
- Styx (West Central Queensland)
- Susan
- Suttor

T

- Tallebudgera
- Tate
- Thomson
- Tingalpa
- Tully

W

- Walsh
- Wanggoolba
- Warrego
- Ward
- Ward
- Water Park
- Watson
- Weir
- Wenlock
- Wilson

Y

- Yappar

=== South Australia ===
- Rivers of South Australia template
- Acraman
- Alberga
- Anacotilla
- Angas
- Breakneck
- Bremer
- Broughton
- Bungala
- Chapman
- Congeratinga
- Cooper
- Crystal Brook
- Currency
- Cygnet
- De Mole
- Diamantina
- Eleanor
- Eyre
- Field
- Finniss
- Finke
- Frome
- Gawler
- Georgina
- Gilbert
- Glenelg
- Harriet
- Hill
- Hindmarsh
- Hutt
- Inman
- Jacobs
- Kallakoopah
- Light
- Little Para
- Macumba
- Marne
- Middle
- Murray
- Myponga
- Neales
- North Para
- North West
- Officer
- Onkaparinga
- Panalatinga
- Parananacooka
- Patawalonga
- Port
- Rocky (Kangaroo Island)
- Rocky (Mid North)
- Sandy
- Siccus
- South Para
- South West
- Strzelecki
- Stun Sail Boom
- Sturt
- Tod
- Torrens
- Wakefield
- Warburton
- Western
- Willson
- Yankalilla
- Yattagolinga

=== Tasmania ===
- Rivers of Tasmania template
- Adams
- Andrew
- Anne
- Anthony
- Apsley
- Arm
- Arthur
- Arve
- Badger
- Black
- Black Bobs
- Blackman
- Blythe
- Boyd
- Break O'Day
- Bream
- Broad
- Browns
- Cam
- Cascade
- Clyde
- Coal
- Cockle
- Collingwood
- Craycroft
- Crayfish
- Davey
- Dee
- Denison
- Derwent
- Don
- Donaldson
- Dover
- Duck
- Elizabeth
- Emu
- Esperance
- Florentine
- Flowerdale
- Forth
- Franklin
- Gordon
- Great Forester
- Hellyer
- Henty
- Hobart
- Holley
- Huon
- Inglis
- Isis
- James
- Jane
- Jordan
- King
- Lea
- Leven
- Liffey
- Little Swanport
- Lune
- Mackintosh
- Macquarie
- Meander
- Mersey
- Murchison
- Nile
- Nive
- North Esk
- Ouse
- Picton
- Pieman
- Pipers
- Pokana
- Queen
- Ringarooma
- Ringarooma (Lower)
- Rubicon
- Savage
- Serpentine
- Shannon
- Sophia
- South Esk
- Spero
- Styx
- Swan
- Tamar
- Tooms
- Tully
- Tyne
- Vale
- Weld
- Wye
- Yolande

=== Victoria ===
- Rivers of Victoria template
- Waterways of Melbourne template

A

- Aberfeldy
- Acheron
- Ada (Baw Baw)
- Ada (East Gippsland)
- Agnes
- Aire
- Albert
- Anglesea
- Arte
- Avoca
- Avon (Gippsland)
- Avon (Grampians)

B

- Barham
- Barkly
- Barwon
- Bass
- Bemm
- Bendoc
- Benedore
- Berrima
- Betka
- Big (Brodribb)
- Big (Goulburn)
- Big (Mitta Mitta)
- Black
- Bonang
- Brodribb
- Broken
- Buchan
- Buckland
- Buffalo
- Bundara
- Bunyip

C

- Calder
- Caledonia
- Campaspe
- Cann
- Cann River East
- Carlisle
- Catherine
- Chetwynd
- Cobungra
- Coliban
- Combienbar
- Crawford
- Crooked
- Cumberland
- Curdies

D

- Dandongadale
- Darby
- Dargo
- Darlot Creek
- Dart
- Deddick
- Delatite
- Delegate
- Don
- Dry
- Dundas

E

- Elliott
- Errinundra
- Eumeralla

F

- Fitzroy
- Ford
- Franklin

G

- Geary
- Gellibrand
- Genoa
- Gibbo
- Glenelg
- Goolengook
- Goulburn
- Grey

H

- Hartland
- Hopkins
- Howqua
- Humffray

I

- Ingeegoodbee

J

- Jack (East Gippsland)
- Jack (Wellington)
- Jamieson
- Johanna
- Jordan

K

- Kennet
- Kiewa
- King

L

- Lang Lang
- Latrobe
- Leigh
- Lerderderg
- Little (Avon)
- Little (Cathedral Range)
- Little (Greater Geelong)
- Little (Moroka)
- Little (Snowy River NP)
- Little (Sydenham Inlet)
- Little (Tambo)
- Little Arte
- Little Coliban
- Little Dargo
- Little Goolengook
- Little Murray
- Little Rubicon
- Little Yalmy
- Little Yarra
- Loch
- Loddon

M

- Macalister
- MacKenzie
- McKenzie
- Maribyrnong
- Merri
- Mitchell
- Mitta Mitta
- Moe
- Moroka
- Moorabool
- Mount Emu Creek
- Morwell
- Moyne
- Mueller
- Murray
- Murrindal
- Murrindindi

N

- Nicholson

O

- Ovens
- O'Shannassy

P

- Patterson
- Parker
- Perry
- Plenty
- Powlett

Q

- Queensborough

R

- Red
- Rich
- Richardson
- Rocky
- Rodger
- Rose
- Royston
- Rubicon

S

- Saint Patricks
- St George
- Shaw
- Snowy
- Steavenson
- Stokes
- Suggan Buggan
- Surrey

T

- Taggerty
- Tambo
- Tanjil
- Taponga
- Tarago
- Tarra
- Tarwin
- The Old
- Thomson
- Thurra
- Tidal
- Timbarra
- Toorongo
- Turton
- Tyers

V

- Victoria

W

- Wallagaraugh
- Wando
- Wannon
- Watts
- Wellington
- Wentworth
- Werribee
- Wimmera
- Wingan
- Woady Yaloak
- Wonnangatta
- Wongungarra
- Wye

Y

- Yalmy
- Yarra
- Yarrowee
- Yea
- Yeerung

=== Western Australia ===
A

- Abba
- Adcock
- Alexander
- Angelo
- Angove
- Armanda
- Arrowsmith
- Arthur
- Ashburton
- Avon

B

- Balgarup
- Balla Balla
- Bannister
- Barker
- Barnett
- Barton
- Beasley
- Beaufort
- Behn
- Berckelman
- Berkeley
- Blackwood
- Bow (southern Western Australia)
- Bow (northern Western Australia)
- Bowes
- Bremer
- Brockman
- Brunswick
- Buayanyup
- Buchanan
- Buller

C

- Calder
- Cane
- Canning
- Capel
- Carbunup
- Carson
- Chamberlain
- Chapman
- Charnley
- Collie
- Coongan

D

- Dale
- Dalyup
- Dandalup
- De Grey
- Deep
- Denmark
- Donnelly
- Drysdale
- Dunham
- Durack

E

- Edmund
- Elvire
- Ernest
- Eyre

F

- Ferguson
- Fitzgerald
- Fitzroy
- Forrest
- Fortescue
- Frankland
- Fraser
- Frederick

G

- Gairdner (southern Western Australia)
- Gairdner (northern Western Australia)
- Gascoyne
- Gibb
- Glenelg
- Goodga
- Gordon
- Greenough

H

- Hamersley
- Hann
- Hardey
- Harding
- Harvey
- Hay
- Helena
- Henry
- Hill
- Hope
- Hotham
- Hunter
- Hutt

I

- Impey
- Irwin
- Isdell

J

- Jerdacuttup
- Johnston

K

- Kalgan
- Kent
- King Edward
- King George
- King (northern Western Australia)
- King (southern Western Australia)

L

- Landor
- Laur
- Lockhart
- Lennard
- Lort
- Ludlow
- Lyons

M

- Mackie
- Maitland
- Margaret (northern Western Australia)
- Margaret (southern Western Australia)
- Mary
- May
- McRae
- Meda
- Minilya
- Mitchell
- Moore
- Mortlock
- Munglinup
- Murchison
- Murray

N

- Nambung
- Negri
- Nicholson
- Nullagine

O

- Oakover
- Oldfield
- Ord

P

- Pallinup
- Panton
- Pentecost
- Phillips
- Preston
- Prince Regent

R

- Richenda
- Robe
- Robinson
- Roe
- Rudall

S

- Sabina
- Sale
- Salt
- Serpentine
- Shannon
- Shaw
- Sherlock
- South Dandalup
- Steere
- Swan

T

- Thomas
- Tone
- Turner

V

- Vasse

W

- Walpole
- Warren
- Waychinicup
- Weld
- Williams
- Wilson
- Wooramel

Y

- Yalgar
- Young
- Yule

== List of major rivers by basin ==
Australia's largest primary rivers

River	Length	Drainage area	Average discharge
I. North East Coast (NEC)
Annan	66 km (41 mi)	939.7 km^{2} (362.8 mi^{2})	31.1 m^{3}/s (980 GL/a)
Baffle Creek		2,541.2 km^{2} (981.2 mi^{2})	11.4 m^{3}/s (360 GL/a)
Barratta Creek	109 km (68 mi)	1,210.8 km^{2} (467.5 mi^{2})	10 m^{3}/s (320 GL/a)
Barron	165 km (103 mi)	2,138 km^{2} (825 mi^{2})	34.6 m^{3}/s (1,090 GL/a)
Bloomfield	18 km (11 mi)	418.5 km^{2} (161.6 mi^{2})	16.2 m^{3}/s (510 GL/a)
Boyne	125 km (78 mi)	2,411.6 km^{2} (931.1 mi^{2})	10.3 m^{3}/s (330 GL/a)
Brisbane	344 km (214 mi)	13,652.3 km^{2} (5,271.2 mi^{2})	56.5 m^{3}/s (1,780 GL/a)
Burdekin	886 km (551 mi)	130,108.3 km^{2} (50,235.1 mi^{2})	394 m^{3}/s (12,400 GL/a)
Burnett	435 km (270 mi)	33,267.2 km^{2} (12,844.5 mi^{2})	78 m^{3}/s (2,500 GL/a)
Burrum	31 km (19 mi)	2,327.4 km^{2} (898.6 mi^{2})	9.5 m^{3}/s (300 GL/a)
Calliope	98 km (61 mi)	1,856.4 km^{2} (716.8 mi^{2})	5 m^{3}/s (160 GL/a)
Claudie	23 km (14 mi)	366.2 km^{2} (141.4 mi^{2})	12.2 m^{3}/s (390 GL/a)
Daintree	140 km (87 mi)	1,303.5 km^{2} (503.3 mi^{2})	66.3 m^{3}/s (2,090 GL/a)
Don	60 km (37 mi)	1,116.8 km^{2} (431.2 mi^{2})	10 m^{3}/s (320 GL/a)
Endeavour	140 km (87 mi)	958.6 km^{2} (370.1 mi^{2})	28.1 m^{3}/s (890 GL/a)
Fitzroy	480 km (300 mi)	142,839.6 km^{2} (55,150.7 mi^{2})	170 m^{3}/s (5,400 GL/a)
Harmer Creek		769.4 km^{2} (297.1 mi^{2})	20.5 m^{3}/s (650 GL/a)
Haughton	110 km (68 mi)	2,172.4 km^{2} (838.8 mi^{2})	11.5 m^{3}/s (360 GL/a)
Herbert	288 km (179 mi)	10,130 km^{2} (3,910 mi^{2})	137 m^{3}/s (4,300 GL/a)
Herbert Creek		1,131.6 km^{2} (436.9 mi^{2})	4.8 m^{3}/s (150 GL/a)
Jeannie	43 km (27 mi)	482.8 km^{2} (186.4 mi^{2})	11 m^{3}/s (350 GL/a)
Johnstone	200 km (120 mi)	1,642.5 km^{2} (634.2 mi^{2})	112.1 m^{3}/s (3,540 GL/a)
Kolan	195 km (121 mi)	2,756.3 km^{2} (1,064.2 mi^{2})	11.8 m^{3}/s (370 GL/a)
Liverpool Creek		333.7 km^{2} (128.8 mi^{2})	21.6 m^{3}/s (680 GL/a)
Logan	184 km (114 mi)	3,841.8 km^{2} (1,483.3 mi^{2})	31.7 m^{3}/s (1,000 GL/a)
Lockhart	36 km (22 mi)	765 km^{2} (295 mi^{2})	16.3 m^{3}/s (510 GL/a)
Mary	291 km (181 mi)	9,019.7 km^{2} (3,482.5 mi^{2})	64.9 m^{3}/s (2,050 GL/a)
Mcivor	65 km (40 mi)	510.2 km^{2} (197.0 mi^{2})	12.7 m^{3}/s (400 GL/a)
Meunga Creek		314.6 km^{2} (121.5 mi^{2})	10 m^{3}/s (320 GL/a)
Mulgrave	70 km (43 mi)	1,390.9 km^{2} (537.0 mi^{2})	101.1 m^{3}/s (3,190 GL/a)
Murray	70 km (43 mi)	555.8 km^{2} (214.6 mi^{2})	20.6 m^{3}/s (650 GL/a)
Murray Creek		557 km^{2} (215 mi^{2})	13 m^{3}/s (410 GL/a)
Nerang	62 km (39 mi)	486.8 km^{2} (188.0 mi^{2})	11.4 m^{3}/s (360 GL/a)
Nesbit	41 km (25 mi)	693.3 km^{2} (267.7 mi^{2})	12.8 m^{3}/s (400 GL/a)
Noosa	60 km (37 mi)	945.5 km^{2} (365.1 mi^{2})	11.3 m^{3}/s (360 GL/a)
Normanby	350 km (220 mi)	24,429.1 km^{2} (9,432.1 mi^{2})	451.6 m^{3}/s (14,250 GL/a)
O'Connell	34.2 km (21.3 mi)	886.5 km^{2} (342.3 mi^{2})	18.4 m^{3}/s (580 GL/a)
Olive	70 km (43 mi)	1,701.6 km^{2} (657.0 mi^{2})	52.3 m^{3}/s (1,650 GL/a)
Pascoe	119 km (74 mi)	2,023.6 km^{2} (781.3 mi^{2})	71.2 m^{3}/s (2,250 GL/a)
Pioneer	120 km (75 mi)	1,550 km^{2} (600 mi^{2})	31 m^{3}/s (980 GL/a)
Proserpine	69 km (43 mi)	1,006.9 km^{2} (388.8 mi^{2})	15.2 m^{3}/s (480 GL/a)
Ross	49 km (30 mi)	917.1 km^{2} (354.1 mi^{2})	10.9 m^{3}/s (340 GL/a)
South Maria Creek		183.3 km^{2} (70.8 mi^{2})	11.3 m^{3}/s (360 GL/a)
Stewart	96 km (60 mi)	837.1 km^{2} (323.2 mi^{2})	12 m^{3}/s (380 GL/a)
Styx	33 km (21 mi)	1,066.5 km^{2} (411.8 mi^{2})	2.7 m^{3}/s (85 GL/a)
Tully	133 km (83 mi)	1,508.5 km^{2} (582.4 mi^{2})	84.5 m^{3}/s (2,670 GL/a)
Other		38,648.4 km^{2} (14,922.2 mi^{2})	559.6 m^{3}/s (17,660 GL/a)
The North East Coast basin total		450,705 km^{2} (174,018 mi^{2})	2,900 m^{3}/s (92,000 GL/a)
II. South East Coast (NSW) South East Coast (SEV)
Avon	122 km (76 mi)	1,829 km^{2} (706 mi^{2})	7.6 m^{3}/s (240 GL/a)
Barwon	160 km (99 mi)	8,795.6 km^{2} (3,396.0 mi^{2})	47 m^{3}/s (1,500 GL/a)
Bega	102.3 km (63.6 mi)	1,960.5 km^{2} (757.0 mi^{2})	10.4 m^{3}/s (330 GL/a)
Bellinger	109 km (68 mi)	1,141.6 km^{2} (440.8 mi^{2})	11.8 m^{3}/s (370 GL/a)
Bemm	58 km (36 mi)	949.7 km^{2} (366.7 mi^{2})	7.6 m^{3}/s (240 GL/a)
Bunyip	76.5 km (47.5 mi)	1,024.9 km^{2} (395.7 mi^{2})	8.5 m^{3}/s (270 GL/a)
Cann	102 km (63 mi)	1,151.2 km^{2} (444.5 mi^{2})	8.6 m^{3}/s (270 GL/a)
Clarence	343 km (213 mi)	22,700 km^{2} (8,800 mi^{2})	165.4 m^{3}/s (5,220 GL/a)
Clyde	102 km (63 mi)	1,732.4 km^{2} (668.9 mi^{2})	12.4 m^{3}/s (390 GL/a)
Curdies	66 km (41 mi)	1,031.5 km^{2} (398.3 mi^{2})	5.9 m^{3}/s (190 GL/a)
Eumeralla	78 km (48 mi)	904.1 km^{2} (349.1 mi^{2})	4.1 m^{3}/s (130 GL/a)
Fitzroy	58 km (36 mi)	1,385.9 km^{2} (535.1 mi^{2})	4.3 m^{3}/s (140 GL/a)
Gellibrand	96 km (60 mi)	1,087.6 km^{2} (419.9 mi^{2})	11 m^{3}/s (350 GL/a)
Genoa	95 km (59 mi)	1,741 km^{2} (672 mi^{2})	13.6 m^{3}/s (430 GL/a)
Georges	96 km (60 mi)	934.1 km^{2} (360.7 mi^{2})	6.5 m^{3}/s (210 GL/a)
Glenelg	350 km (220 mi)	12,157 km^{2} (4,694 mi^{2})	22.3 m^{3}/s (700 GL/a)
Hastings	180 km (110 mi)	4,490 km^{2} (1,730 mi^{2})	58.7 m^{3}/s (1,850 GL/a)
Hawkesbury	120 km (75 mi)	21,810 km^{2} (8,420 mi^{2})	95 m^{3}/s (3,000 GL/a)
Hopkins	271 km (168 mi)	8,843.9 km^{2} (3,414.6 mi^{2})	47 m^{3}/s (1,500 GL/a)
Hunter	300 km (190 mi)	21,430 km^{2} (8,270 mi^{2})	60 m^{3}/s (1,900 GL/a)
Karuah	101 km (63 mi)	1,445.5 km^{2} (558.1 mi^{2})	10 m^{3}/s (320 GL/a)
La Trobe	271 km (168 mi)	9,273 km^{2} (3,580 mi^{2})	54.8 m^{3}/s (1,730 GL/a)
Macleay	298 km (185 mi)	11,420 km^{2} (4,410 mi^{2})	62 m^{3}/s (2,000 GL/a)
Manning	261 km (162 mi)	8,190 km^{2} (3,160 mi^{2})	78 m^{3}/s (2,500 GL/a)
Merri	89.7 km (55.7 mi)	1,029.1 km^{2} (397.3 mi^{2})	7.4 m^{3}/s (230 GL/a)
Mitchell	121 km (75 mi)	4,873 km^{2} (1,881 mi^{2})	35 m^{3}/s (1,100 GL/a)
Moruya	157.6 km (97.9 mi)	1,435.1 km^{2} (554.1 mi^{2})	8.3 m^{3}/s (260 GL/a)
Moyne	82 km (51 mi)	626.3 km^{2} (241.8 mi^{2})	3.7 m^{3}/s (120 GL/a)
Myall	92 km (57 mi)	967.2 km^{2} (373.4 mi^{2})	6.5 m^{3}/s (210 GL/a)
Nambucca	87 km (54 mi)	1,299 km^{2} (502 mi^{2})	12.7 m^{3}/s (400 GL/a)
Patterson	58 km (36 mi)	778.6 km^{2} (300.6 mi^{2})	5.5 m^{3}/s (170 GL/a)
Richmond	248 km (154 mi)	6,862 km^{2} (2,649 mi^{2})	106 m^{3}/s (3,300 GL/a)
Shoalhaven	327 km (203 mi)	7,086 km^{2} (2,736 mi^{2})	49 m^{3}/s (1,500 GL/a)
Snowy	352 km (219 mi)	15,796 km^{2} (6,099 mi^{2})	75 m^{3}/s (2,400 GL/a)
Stewarts	62 km (39 mi)	621.1 km^{2} (239.8 mi^{2})	6.3 m^{3}/s (200 GL/a)
Tambo	186 km (116 mi)	2,891 km^{2} (1,116 mi^{2})	10.4 m^{3}/s (330 GL/a)
Tarwin	81.8 km (50.8 mi)	1,591.7 km^{2} (614.6 mi^{2})	11 m^{3}/s (350 GL/a)
Towamba	86 km (53 mi)	1,094.2 km^{2} (422.5 mi^{2})	7.2 m^{3}/s (230 GL/a)
Tuross	147 km (91 mi)	1,815.1 km^{2} (700.8 mi^{2})	18.5 m^{3}/s (580 GL/a)
Tweed	78 km (48 mi)	1,080 km^{2} (420 mi^{2})	25.4 m^{3}/s (800 GL/a)
Yarra	242 km (150 mi)	5,464.4 km^{2} (2,109.8 mi^{2})	38 m^{3}/s (1,200 GL/a)
Werribee	110 km (68 mi)	1,453.5 km^{2} (561.2 mi^{2})	7.3 m^{3}/s (230 GL/a)
Other		62,711.8 km^{2} (24,213.2 mi^{2})	186.6 m^{3}/s (5,890 GL/a)
The South East Coast basin total		268,000 km^{2} (103,000 mi^{2})	1,440 m^{3}/s (45,000 GL/a)
III. South Australian Gulf (SAG)
IV. South West Coast (SWC)
V. Pilbara–Gascoyne (PG) (Indian Ocean)
Ashburton	680 km (420 mi)	75,698 km^{2} (29,227 mi^{2})	22 m^{3}/s (690 GL/a)
Cane	168 km (104 mi)	2,798.6 km^{2} (1,080.5 mi^{2})	2 m^{3}/s (63 GL/a)
Chapman	105 km (65 mi)	1,952 km^{2} (754 mi^{2})	1.7 m^{3}/s (54 GL/a)
De Grey^{*}	569 km (354 mi)	56,716 km^{2} (21,898 mi^{2})	36.4 m^{3}/s (1,150 GL/a)
Fortescue	760 km (470 mi)	49,759 km^{2} (19,212 mi^{2})	12.4 m^{3}/s (390 GL/a)
Gascoyne	865 km (537 mi)	75,835 km^{2} (29,280 mi^{2})	20.5 m^{3}/s (650 GL/a)
George	182 km (113 mi)	1,994.4 km^{2} (770.0 mi^{2})	2 m^{3}/s (63 GL/a)
Gibb	112 km (70 mi)	10,496.2 km^{2} (4,052.6 mi^{2})	2.7 m^{3}/s (85 GL/a)
Greenough	361 km (224 mi)	12,164.8 km^{2} (4,696.9 mi^{2})	6.6 m^{3}/s (210 GL/a)
Harding	150 km (93 mi)	1,685.3 km^{2} (650.7 mi^{2})	1.3 m^{3}/s (41 GL/a)
Hutt	72.4 km (45.0 mi)	1,326.4 km^{2} (512.1 mi^{2})	0.34 m^{3}/s (11 GL/a)
Irwin	149 km (93 mi)	6,145.9 km^{2} (2,372.9 mi^{2})	5.2 m^{3}/s (160 GL/a)
Maitland	92 km (57 mi)	2,083.4 km^{2} (804.4 mi^{2})	0.8 m^{3}/s (25 GL/a)
Murchison	820 km (510 mi)	91,253 km^{2} (35,233 mi^{2})	10.8 m^{3}/s (340 GL/a)
Pardoo Creek	99.9 km (62.1 mi)	1,526.7 km^{2} (589.5 mi^{2})	2.6 m^{3}/s (82 GL/a)
Peawah	106 km (66 mi)	2,222.8 km^{2} (858.2 mi^{2})	2.8 m^{3}/s (88 GL/a)
Robe	276 km (171 mi)	7,587.8 km^{2} (2,929.7 mi^{2})	10.3 m^{3}/s (330 GL/a)
Sherlock	393 km (244 mi)	5,137.1 km^{2} (1,983.4 mi^{2})	6 m^{3}/s (190 GL/a)
Turner	236 km (147 mi)	3,584.8 km^{2} (1,384.1 mi^{2})	3.5 m^{3}/s (110 GL/a)
Yule	190 km (120 mi)	8,636.9 km^{2} (3,334.7 mi^{2})	7.1 m^{3}/s (220 GL/a)
Other		101,395.9 km^{2} (39,149.2 mi^{2})	41 m^{3}/s (1,300 GL/a)
The Pilbara–Gascoyne basin total		520,000 km^{2} (200,000 mi^{2})	198 m^{3}/s (6,200 GL/a)
VI. Tanami–Timor Sea Coast (TTS)
Adelaide	238 km (148 mi)	7,430 km^{2} (2,870 mi^{2})	60 m^{3}/s (1,900 GL/a)
Berkeley	135 km (84 mi)	5,149 km^{2} (1,988 mi^{2})	13.1 m^{3}/s (410 GL/a)
Blyth	175 km (109 mi)	9,219 km^{2} (3,559 mi^{2})	58.9 m^{3}/s (1,860 GL/a)
Buckingham	59 km (37 mi)	1,301.7 km^{2} (502.6 mi^{2})	10 m^{3}/s (320 GL/a)
Charnley	148 km (92 mi)	6,043.7 km^{2} (2,333.5 mi^{2})	21.2 m^{3}/s (670 GL/a)
Daly^{*}	682 km (424 mi)	53,708 km^{2} (20,737 mi^{2})	376 m^{3}/s (11,900 GL/a)
Deep Creek		6,736.9 km^{2} (2,601.1 mi^{2})	4.4 m^{3}/s (140 GL/a)
Drysdale	432 km (268 mi)	15,722.5 km^{2} (6,070.5 mi^{2})	34.2 m^{3}/s (1,080 GL/a)
Durack	306 km (190 mi)	14,237.9 km^{2} (5,497.3 mi^{2})	26.1 m^{3}/s (820 GL/a)
East Alligator	160 km (99 mi)	15,876 km^{2} (6,130 mi^{2})	218 m^{3}/s (6,900 GL/a)
Finniss		2,391.5 km^{2} (923.4 mi^{2})	21.4 m^{3}/s (680 GL/a)
Fitzmaurice	276 km (171 mi)	6,662.1 km^{2} (2,572.3 mi^{2})	48 m^{3}/s (1,500 GL/a)
Mardoowarra Fitzroy	733 km (455 mi)	95,694.5 km^{2} (36,947.9 mi^{2})	210 m^{3}/s (6,600 GL/a)
Forrest	141 km (88 mi)	3,061.2 km^{2} (1,181.9 mi^{2})	5.6 m^{3}/s (180 GL/a)
Fraser	70 km (43 mi)	2,467 km^{2} (953 mi^{2})	7.7 m^{3}/s (240 GL/a)
Glenelg	89 km (55 mi)	1,864 km^{2} (720 mi^{2})	13 m^{3}/s (410 GL/a)
Glyde	171 km (106 mi)	10,391 km^{2} (4,012 mi^{2})	66.5 m^{3}/s (2,100 GL/a)
Goomadeer	138 km (86 mi)	2,468.3 km^{2} (953.0 mi^{2})	36.1 m^{3}/s (1,140 GL/a)
Isdell	206 km (128 mi)	5,526 km^{2} (2,134 mi^{2})	18.4 m^{3}/s (580 GL/a)
Keep	258 km (160 mi)	4,996 km^{2} (1,929 mi^{2})	15.8 m^{3}/s (500 GL/a)
King Edward	221 km (137 mi)	8,480.8 km^{2} (3,274.5 mi^{2})	42.8 m^{3}/s (1,350 GL/a)
King George	112 km (70 mi)	2,884.6 km^{2} (1,113.8 mi^{2})	14.5 m^{3}/s (460 GL/a)
Liverpool	138 km (86 mi)	8,480 km^{2} (3,270 mi^{2})	135 m^{3}/s (4,300 GL/a)
Mary	225 km (140 mi)	7,413.8 km^{2} (2,862.5 mi^{2})	76.1 m^{3}/s (2,400 GL/a)
May	69 km (43 mi)	2,412 km^{2} (931 mi^{2})	5.5 m^{3}/s (170 GL/a)
Meda	88 km (55 mi)	11,851 km^{2} (4,576 mi^{2})	32.8 m^{3}/s (1,040 GL/a)
Mitchell	117 km (73 mi)	2,955 km^{2} (1,141 mi^{2})	20.5 m^{3}/s (650 GL/a)
Moyle	133 km (83 mi)	3,397.7 km^{2} (1,311.9 mi^{2})	20 m^{3}/s (630 GL/a)
Murgenella Creek		2,139.3 km^{2} (826.0 mi^{2})	15.3 m^{3}/s (480 GL/a)
Ord	651 km (405 mi)	55,385 km^{2} (21,384 mi^{2})	150 m^{3}/s (4,700 GL/a)
Pentecost	118 km (73 mi)	8,975.4 km^{2} (3,465.4 mi^{2})	19 m^{3}/s (600 GL/a)
Prince Regent	106 km (66 mi)	2,127.3 km^{2} (821.4 mi^{2})	10.1 m^{3}/s (320 GL/a)
Reynolds		1,870.6 km^{2} (722.2 mi^{2})	24.8 m^{3}/s (780 GL/a)
Robinson	107 km (66 mi)	2,559 km^{2} (988 mi^{2})	10 m^{3}/s (320 GL/a)
Roe	66 km (41 mi)	3,284 km^{2} (1,268 mi^{2})	16.4 m^{3}/s (520 GL/a)
South Alligator	160 km (99 mi)	11,917 km^{2} (4,601 mi^{2})	182 m^{3}/s (5,700 GL/a)
Victoria	560 km (350 mi)	99,412.5 km^{2} (38,383.4 mi^{2})	159 m^{3}/s (5,000 GL/a)
West Alligator	80 km (50 mi)	1,302.8 km^{2} (503.0 mi^{2})	12 m^{3}/s (380 GL/a)
Wildman Creek	98 km (61 mi)	2,493.4 km^{2} (962.7 mi^{2})	25.4 m^{3}/s (800 GL/a)
Other		651,712.5 km^{2} (251,627.6 mi^{2})	404.4 m^{3}/s (12,760 GL/a)
The Tanami–Timor Sea Coast basin total		1,162,000 km^{2} (449,000 mi^{2})	2,640 m^{3}/s (83,000 GL/a)
VII. Carpentaria Coast (CC)
Archer	268 km (167 mi)	13,848 km^{2} (5,347 mi^{2})	235.3 m^{3}/s (7,430 GL/a)
Calvert	222 km (138 mi)	10,333 km^{2} (3,990 mi^{2})	30 m^{3}/s (950 GL/a)
Chapman		2,042.8 km^{2} (788.7 mi^{2})	23.7 m^{3}/s (750 GL/a)
Cliffdale Creek	197 km (122 mi)	2,783.7 km^{2} (1,074.8 mi^{2})	7.2 m^{3}/s (230 GL/a)
Coleman		5,192.1 km^{2} (2,004.7 mi^{2})	48.8 m^{3}/s (1,540 GL/a)
Ducie	69 km (43 mi)	3,226.6 km^{2} (1,245.8 mi^{2})	53 m^{3}/s (1,700 GL/a)
Edward	208 km (129 mi)	4,000.9 km^{2} (1,544.8 mi^{2})	43.4 m^{3}/s (1,370 GL/a)
Eight Mile Creek		1,389.7 km^{2} (536.6 mi^{2})	4.2 m^{3}/s (130 GL/a)
Embley	54 km (34 mi)	863.4 km^{2} (333.4 mi^{2})	15.3 m^{3}/s (480 GL/a)
Flinders	1,004 km (624 mi)	109,715 km^{2} (42,361 mi^{2})	122.2 m^{3}/s (3,860 GL/a)
Gilbert	887 km (551 mi)	46,412 km^{2} (17,920 mi^{2})	171.3 m^{3}/s (5,410 GL/a)
Hey	17 km (11 mi)	521.6 km^{2} (201.4 mi^{2})	10.4 m^{3}/s (330 GL/a)
Holroyd	325 km (202 mi)	10,287 km^{2} (3,972 mi^{2})	127.9 m^{3}/s (4,040 GL/a)
Jackson	64.7 km (40.2 mi)	1,625.7 km^{2} (627.7 mi^{2})	28.5 m^{3}/s (900 GL/a)
Jardine	162 km (101 mi)	3,282 km^{2} (1,267 mi^{2})	105 m^{3}/s (3,300 GL/a)
Kirke	83.6 km (51.9 mi)	1,464.9 km^{2} (565.6 mi^{2})	24.4 m^{3}/s (770 GL/a)
Koolatong	92 km (57 mi)	2,607 km^{2} (1,007 mi^{2})	25.4 m^{3}/s (800 GL/a)
Lagoon Creek	136 km (85 mi)	2,425.6 km^{2} (936.5 mi^{2})	7.4 m^{3}/s (230 GL/a)
Leichhardt	630 km (390 mi)	33,287 km^{2} (12,852 mi^{2})	69 m^{3}/s (2,200 GL/a)
Limmen Bight	514 km (319 mi)	15,938 km^{2} (6,154 mi^{2})	36.6 m^{3}/s (1,160 GL/a)
McArthur	521 km (324 mi)	19,597 km^{2} (7,566 mi^{2})	45 m^{3}/s (1,400 GL/a)
Mission	37 km (23 mi)	1,239.5 km^{2} (478.6 mi^{2})	21.1 m^{3}/s (670 GL/a)
Mitchell	750 km (470 mi)	71,757 km^{2} (27,706 mi^{2})	727.3 m^{3}/s (22,950 GL/a)
Nicholson	725 km (450 mi)	53,200 km^{2} (20,500 mi^{2})	103.3 m^{3}/s (3,260 GL/a)
Norman	679 km (422 mi)	50,445 km^{2} (19,477 mi^{2})	74.3 m^{3}/s (2,340 GL/a)
Robinson	215 km (134 mi)	11,369 km^{2} (4,390 mi^{2})	23.9 m^{3}/s (750 GL/a)
Roper^{*}	599 km (372 mi)	81,794 km^{2} (31,581 mi^{2})	176 m^{3}/s (5,600 GL/a)
Rose	169 km (105 mi)	3,601.5 km^{2} (1,390.5 mi^{2})	17.1 m^{3}/s (540 GL/a)
Rosie Creek	88.3 km (54.9 mi)	1,942.4 km^{2} (750.0 mi^{2})	7.3 m^{3}/s (230 GL/a)
Settlement Creek	142 km (88 mi)	3,940.4 km^{2} (1,521.4 mi^{2})	12 m^{3}/s (380 GL/a)
Staaten	383 km (238 mi)	25,732 km^{2} (9,935 mi^{2})	217.1 m^{3}/s (6,850 GL/a)
Towns	84 km (52 mi)	4,530.1 km^{2} (1,749.1 mi^{2})	11 m^{3}/s (350 GL/a)
Walker	119 km (74 mi)	2,285.4 km^{2} (882.4 mi^{2})	15.3 m^{3}/s (480 GL/a)
Ward	46 km (29 mi)	633.2 km^{2} (244.5 mi^{2})	12.4 m^{3}/s (390 GL/a)
Watson	92 km (57 mi)	2,885.2 km^{2} (1,114.0 mi^{2})	48.6 m^{3}/s (1,530 GL/a)
Wearyan	152 km (94 mi)	3,742.9 km^{2} (1,445.1 mi^{2})	11.3 m^{3}/s (360 GL/a)
Wenlock	322 km (200 mi)	7,460 km^{2} (2,880 mi^{2})	126.7 m^{3}/s (4,000 GL/a)
Other		26,541.9 km^{2} (10,247.9 mi^{2})	191.2 m^{3}/s (6,030 GL/a)
The Carpentaria Coast basin total		641,000 km^{2} (247,000 mi^{2})	3,029.9 m^{3}/s (95,620 GL/a)
VIII. Tasmania (TAS)
IX. Murray–Darling Basin (MDB)
Murray	2,508 km (1,558 mi)	1,061,469 km^{2} (409,835 mi^{2})	459.3 m^{3}/s (14,490 GL/a)
The Murray–Darling basin total		1,061,469 km^{2} (409,835 mi^{2})	459.3 m^{3}/s (14,490 GL/a)
X. Lake Eyre Basin Bulloo–Bancannia
Lake Eyre Basin
Cooper Creek^{*}	1,420 km (880 mi)	297,950 km^{2} (115,040 mi^{2})	35.7 m^{3}/s (1,130 GL/a)
Finke–Macumba	750 km (470 mi)	101,490 km^{2} (39,190 mi^{2})	6.5 m^{3}/s (210 GL/a)
Frome	245 km (152 mi)	18,200 km^{2} (7,000 mi^{2})	1.1 m^{3}/s (35 GL/a)
Hale–Todd	424 km (263 mi)	59,890 km^{2} (23,120 mi^{2})	2.7 m^{3}/s (85 GL/a)
Hay	728 km (452 mi)	100,376 km^{2} (38,755 mi^{2})	4.6 m^{3}/s (150 GL/a)
Neales	420 km (260 mi)	35,000 km^{2} (14,000 mi^{2})	2.6 m^{3}/s (82 GL/a)
Warburton–Georgina–Diamantina^{*}	1,400 km (870 mi)	408,005 km^{2} (157,532 mi^{2})	60.2 m^{3}/s (1,900 GL/a)
Other		149,089 km^{2} (57,564 mi^{2})	33.1 m^{3}/s (1,040 GL/a)
Bulloo–Bancannia Basin
Bulloo	600 km (370 mi)	48,033.7 km^{2} (18,545.9 mi^{2})	9.8 m^{3}/s (310 GL/a)
Other		52,966.3 km^{2} (20,450.4 mi^{2})	7.5 m^{3}/s (240 GL/a)
The Lake Eyre and Bulloo–Bancannia basin total		1,271,000 km^{2} (491,000 mi^{2})	162.2 m^{3}/s (5,120 GL/a)
XI. South Western Plateau (SWP) North Western Plateau (NWP)
Australia			

*Daly–Katherine (682 km), Roper–Waterhouse (599 km), Cooper Creek–Barcoo (1,420 km), Warburton–Georgina (1,400 km); De Grey–Oakover (569 km);

== See also ==
- List of rivers
- List of drainage basins of Australia
- List of valleys of Australia
