= List of watercourses in Western Australia, B =

Western Australia has many watercourses with gazetted names, including rivers, streams, brooks, creeks, gullies, anabranches and backwaters.

This list is complete with respect to the 1996 Gazetteer of Australia. Dubious names have been checked against the online 2004 data, and in all cases confirmed correct. However, if any watercourses have been gazetted or deleted since 1996, this list does not reflect these changes. Strictly speaking, Australian place names are gazetted in capital letters only; the names in this list have been converted to mixed case in accordance with normal capitalization conventions. Locations are as gazetted; some watercourses may extend over long distances.

== B ==
| Name | Latitude | Longitude | Remarks |
|---|---|---|---|
| Bachsten Creek | 16° 0' 18" S | 125° 13' 33" E | |
| Badgarning Creek | 33° 22' 41" S | 117° 20' 18" E | |
| Badgedong Creek | 28° 24' 26" S | 115° 25' 6" E | |
| Badji Badji Brook | 30° 56' 58" S | 116° 14' 20" E | |
| Badjirrajirra Creek | 22° 6' 50" S | 114° 5' 31" E | |
| Bailey Creek | 28° 35' 14" S | 123° 3' 47" E | |
| Bailup Creek | 31° 44' 58" S | 116° 16' 0" E | |
| Bajorpin Brook | 31° 18' 30" S | 116° 48' 49" E | |
| Bakelup Creek | 33° 53' 52" S | 119° 0' 18" E | |
| Balbarrup Brook | 34° 12' 42" S | 116° 11' 2" E | |
| Baldwin Creek | 17° 1' 15" S | 122° 23' 3" E | |
| Balgarup River | 33° 41' 2" S | 116° 43' 51" E | |
| Balgobin Brook | 32° 29' 6" S | 115° 53' 30" E | |
| Balingup Brook | 33° 50' 34" S | 115° 54' 53" E | |
| Balingup Brook East | 33° 43' 53" S | 116° 5' 13" E | |
| Balingup Brook South | 33° 45' 3" S | 116° 10' 0" E | |
| Ball Creek | 31° 57' 55" S | 116° 12' 12" E | |
| Balla Balla River | 20° 41' 53" S | 117° 47' 57" E | |
| Ballajup Brook | 33° 59' 7" S | 116° 18' 6" E | |
| Balley Balley Brook | 31° 56' 31" S | 116° 56' 46" E | |
| Bally Bally Gully | 32° 13' 50" S | 117° 5' 54" E | |
| Ballyeerina Creek | 21° 49' 58" S | 117° 35' 6" E | |
| Balyinnarup Brook | 34° 21' 32" S | 116° 26' 42" E | |
| Bamboo Creek | 16° 56' 46" S | 128° 24' 12" E | |
| Bamboo Creek | 15° 50' 41" S | 127° 21' 52" E | |
| Bamboo Creek | 18° 0' 23" S | 128° 33' 42" E | |
| Bamboo Creek | 20° 44' 24" S | 120° 9' 59" E | |
| Bamboo Creek | 16° 54' 9" S | 125° 15' 42" E | |
| Bambra Creek | 15° 13' 46" S | 127° 39' 11" E | |
| Banana Creek | 21° 31' 55" S | 119° 20' 34" E | |
| Bancell Brook | 32° 55' 56" S | 115° 54' 10" E | |
| Bandalup Creek | 33° 44' 12" S | 120° 20' 28" E | |
| Bandeeyer Creek | 21° 26' 55" S | 116° 34' 35" E | |
| Bandy Creek | 33° 50' 2" S | 121° 55' 53" E | |
| Bangalup Brook | 34° 22' 30" S | 116° 24' 25" E | |
| Bangemall Creek | 24° 7' 0" S | 116° 28' 9" E | |
| Bangemall Creek | 28° 9' 33" S | 115° 34' 31" E | |
| Bango Creek | 15° 0' 29" S | 126° 56' 21" E | |
| Banjo Creek | 15° 15' 32" S | 126° 54' 42" E | |
| Banjo Creek | 26° 7' 47" S | 122° 7' 17" E | |
| Banksia Creek | 33° 54' 9" S | 115° 17' 43" E | |
| Banksia Gully | 32° 24' 11" S | 116° 9' 59" E | |
| Banningarra Creek | 20° 2' 7" S | 119° 41' 43" E | |
| Bannister River | 32° 47' 28" S | 116° 28' 52" E | |
| Baobab Creek | 17° 15' 4" S | 125° 41' 42" E | |
| Baobab Creek | 16° 31' 28" S | 128° 48' 37" E | |
| Barimaia Creek | 28° 9' 26" S | 117° 52' 39" E | |
| Barker Creek | 21° 3' 35" S | 121° 0' 30" E | |
| Barker River | 17° 19' 33" S | 124° 38' 47" E | |
| Barlee Brook | 34° 21' 16" S | 115° 44' 49" E | |
| Barndar Creek | 24° 7' 29" S | 115° 36' 50" E | |
| Barnett Brook | 32° 40' 14" S | 116° 13' 43" E | |
| Barnett Creek | 22° 19' 46" S | 117° 39' 2" E | |
| Barnett Gully | 32° 1' 3" S | 115° 31' 25" E | |
| Barnett River | 16° 51' 12" S | 126° 3' 38" E | |
| Baronne Creek | 25° 13' 43" S | 116° 8' 27" E | |
| Barrabiddy Creek | 23° 54' 9" S | 113° 58' 58" E | |
| Barrawanga Creek | 20° 54' 30" S | 116° 39' 49" E | |
| Barred Creek | 17° 39' 46" S | 122° 11' 33" E | |
| Barton River | 14° 11' 33" S | 126° 59' 20" E | |
| Basin Gully | 32° 2' 30" S | 117° 0' 21" E | |
| Basset Bend Creek | 20° 54' 40" S | 117° 7' 18" E | |
| Batalling Creek | 33° 22' 15" S | 116° 34' 41" E | |
| Bates Creek (Western Australia) | 27° 17' 44" S | 121° 8' 2" E | |
| Battery Creek | 15° 37' 21" S | 128° 27' 58" E | |
| Battery Creek | 16° 42' 21" S | 125° 24' 13" E | |
| Bauhinia Creek | 17° 20' 4" S | 125° 52' 12" E | |
| Baynup Gully | 33° 46' 55" S | 116° 36' 35" E | |
| Bayonet Creek | 16° 14' 10" S | 125° 27' 9" E | |
| Beabea Creek | 21° 36' 42" S | 118° 38' 7" E | |
| Beadon Creek | 21° 39' 5" S | 115° 7' 49" E | |
| Beasley Creek, Western Australia | 28° 31' 39" S | 122° 20' 20" E | |
| Beasley River | 22° 59' 25" S | 116° 53' 8" E | |
| Beasley River West | 22° 52' 16" S | 117° 7' 33" E | |
| Beaton Creek | 29° 16' 20" S | 115° 36' 36" E | |
| Beaton Creek | 21° 53' 36" S | 120° 6' 18" E | |
| Beaufort River | 33° 31' 4" S | 116° 48' 59" E | |
| Beaufort River East | 33° 29' 57" S | 117° 5' 47" E | |
| Bebakine Creek | 31° 25' 7" S | 116° 43' 45" E | |
| Beckett Gully | 29° 1' 26" S | 115° 28' 14" E | |
| Bedaburra Creek | 25° 54' 22" S | 117° 22' 34" E | |
| Bedford Creek | 25° 8' 5" S | 127° 12' 51" E | |
| Bee Well Creek | 23° 51' 22" S | 115° 13' 22" E | |
| Beebingarra Creek | 20° 26' 52" S | 118° 41' 12" E | |
| Beedarry Creek | 25° 24' 23" S | 117° 9' 46" E | |
| Beedelup Brook | 34° 25' 8" S | 115° 50' 46" E | |
| Beera Creek | 28° 42' 53" S | 117° 21' 51" E | |
| Behn River | 16° 23' 36" S | 128° 51' 6" E | |
| Bejoording Brook | 31° 22' 50" S | 116° 30' 32" E | |
| Belar Brook | 30° 54' 28" S | 116° 14' 18" E | |
| Bell Brook | 33° 0' 39" S | 116° 15' 12" E | |
| Bell Brook | 34° 58' 17" S | 116° 35' 56" E | |
| Bell Creek | 16° 35' 26" S | 128° 57' 30" E | |
| Bell Creek | 16° 52' 34" S | 125° 9' 15" E | |
| Bella Creek | 16° 32' 34" S | 126° 20' 29" E | |
| Bellary Creek | 23° 11' 18" S | 117° 42' 18" E | |
| Bells Creek | 17° 56' 0" S | 124° 48' 5" E | |
| Belluguttin Creek | 31° 28' 49" S | 118° 5' 10" E | |
| Bendhu Creek | 20° 38' 0" S | 119° 55' 0" E | |
| Bending Gully | 31° 57' 25" S | 116° 9' 38" E | |
| Bennett Brook (Australia) | 31° 53' 42" S | 115° 57' 28" E | |
| Beraking Brook | 32° 5' 20" S | 116° 19' 5" E | |
| Berckelman River | 16° 3' 37" S | 124° 53' 47" E | |
| Berkeley River | 14° 20' 49" S | 127° 46' 48" E | |
| Berrendenning Brook | 31° 22' 3" S | 116° 55' 30" E | |
| Berring Creek | 27° 9' 59" S | 117° 43' 59" E | |
| Bertha Creek | 28° 37' 21" S | 124° 22' 50" E | |
| Beta Creek | 14° 16' 35" S | 127° 19' 25" E | |
| Betta Creek | 15° 50' 28" S | 128° 19' 16" E | |
| Bibbining Gully | 31° 6' 38" S | 117° 54' 15" E | |
| Bibby Creek | 30° 32' 26" S | 115° 13' 26" E | |
| Biberkine Brook | 32° 39' 34" S | 116° 52' 31" E | |
| Bickley Brook | 32° 2' 42" S | 115° 57' 51" E | |
| Bickleys Creek | 17° 43' 45" S | 126° 2' 21" E | |
| Bickleys Creek | 17° 44' 7" S | 125° 59' 52" E | |
| Biddenew Creek | 25° 7' 25" S | 116° 29' 16" E | |
| Big Brook | 33° 5' 24" S | 115° 58' 45" E | |
| Big Brook | 32° 29' 6" S | 116° 10' 8" E | |
| Big Brook | 32° 51' 24" S | 116° 7' 54" E | |
| Big Brook | 34° 23' 59" S | 116° 0' 9" E | |
| The Big Brook | 34° 13' 13" S | 116° 6' 43" E | |
| Big Creek | 22° 5' 36" S | 119° 32' 41" E | |
| Big Creek | 33° 37' 46" S | 119° 53' 35" E | |
| Big Creek | 23° 3' 28" S | 118° 5' 17" E | |
| Big Creek | 34° 53' 2" S | 116° 29' 7" E | |
| Big Easter Brook | 34° 12' 26" S | 115° 48' 59" E | |
| Big Mabel Creek | 17° 10' 25" S | 128° 9' 22" E | |
| Big Minnie Creek | 24° 3' 25" S | 115° 48' 55" E | |
| Big Spring Creek | 17° 47' 59" S | 125° 27' 59" E | |
| Big Spring Creek | 24° 20' 2" S | 119° 3' 13" E | |
| Big Ti Tree Creek | 33° 52' 39" S | 115° 15' 20" E | |
| Big Togo Creek | 17° 38' 52" S | 127° 47' 0" E | |
| Biggada Creek | 20° 46' 50" S | 115° 20' 40" E | |
| Biggs Brook | 31° 24' 59" S | 116° 11' 31" E | |
| Bighill Brook | 34° 29' 48" S | 116° 10' 50" E | |
| Biljedup Brook | 33° 48' 13" S | 114° 59' 58" E | |
| Billin Ballin Creek | 21° 58' 6" S | 120° 53' 4" E | |
| Billy Can Creek | 18° 9' 4" S | 128° 34' 24" E | |
| Billy Goat Creek | 16° 31' 0" S | 128° 29' 33" E | |
| Billy Well Creek | 24° 18' 17" S | 115° 31' 46" E | |
| Bilung Creek | 25° 43' 25" S | 115° 53' 24" E | |
| Binda Creek | 19° 56' 53" S | 126° 39' 31" E | |
| Bindalup Creek | 33° 33' 11" S | 120° 8' 45" E | |
| Bindangwah Creek | 27° 25' 38" S | 116° 42' 9" E | |
| Bindermucking Gully | 32° 28' 5" S | 117° 31' 39" E | |
| Bindiup Creek | 33° 8' 22" S | 115° 50' 55" E | |
| Bindoola Creek | 15° 42' 15" S | 127° 50' 59" E | |
| Bindoon Brook | 31° 22' 58" S | 115° 58' 28" E | |
| Bindoon Creek | 29° 52' 36" S | 115° 9' 41" E | |
| Bingah Creek | 26° 7' 29" S | 122° 1' 46" E | |
| Bingangwah Brook | 27° 26' 13" S | 116° 45' 50" E | |
| Bingham River | 33° 19' 59" S | 116° 16' 29" E | |
| Binthabooka Creek | 24° 44' 59" S | 115° 16' 48" E | |
| Birringine Creek | 26° 31' 2" S | 118° 12' 54" E | |
| Birthday Creek | 22° 35' 59" S | 114° 22' 59" E | |
| Bishop Creek | 21° 8' 15" S | 120° 11' 18" E | |
| Bishop Gully | 28° 13' 29" S | 114° 19' 46" E | |
| Bitter Water Creek | 26° 1' 39" S | 126° 42' 51" E | |
| Bitter Water Creek | 34° 26' 46" S | 119° 18' 22" E | |
| Biyan Creek | 20° 42' 2" S | 117° 51' 5" E | |
| Black Adder Creek | 25° 10' 11" S | 117° 4' 9" E | |
| Black Boy Creek | 33° 53' 14" S | 122° 54' 37" E | |
| Black Cat Creek | 34° 57' 12" S | 118° 6' 8" E | |
| Black Duck Creek | 17° 48' 44" S | 128° 9' 57" E | |
| Black Elvire River | 18° 17' 9" S | 127° 56' 3" E | |
| Black Hill Creek | 17° 49' 10" S | 125° 37' 20" E | |
| Black Mare Creek | 16° 24' 10" S | 125° 35' 10" E | |
| Black Range Creek | 21° 43' 1" S | 119° 24' 20" E | |
| Black Rock Creek | 17° 31' 37" S | 128° 9' 31" E | |
| Black Rock Creek | 15° 37' 45" S | 128° 41' 25" E | |
| Black Snake Creek | 33° 49' 25" S | 115° 20' 54" E | |
| Black Tom Brook | 32° 53' 10" S | 115° 53' 45" E | |
| Black Wattle Creek | 31° 26' 49" S | 116° 23' 57" E | |
| Blackadder Creek | 31° 53' 13" S | 115° 59' 22" E | |
| Blackboy Gully | 31° 47' 4" S | 116° 31' 6" E | |
| Blackfellow Creek | 16° 18' 34" S | 126° 58' 37" E | |
| Blackfellow Creek | 17° 0' 35" S | 127° 36' 11" E | |
| Blackfellow Creek | 18° 6' 24" S | 127° 6' 40" E | |
| Blackfellow Creek | 16° 37' 51" S | 125° 23' 39" E | |
| Blackfellow Creek | 16° 49' 25" S | 128° 24' 10" E | |
| Blackheart Creek | 21° 41' 32" S | 116° 30' 24" E | |
| Blackheart Creek | 24° 7' 51" S | 115° 0' 21" E | |
| Blackwater Creek | 34° 49' 47" S | 116° 5' 45" E | |
| Blackwood River | 34° 16' 39" S | 115° 11' 56" E | |
| Bland Brook | 31° 53' 39" S | 116° 46' 15" E | |
| Blariyaning Creek | 18° 16' 22" S | 125° 33' 29" E | |
| Blina Creek | 17° 58' 32" S | 124° 15' 41" E | |
| Blind Creek | 17° 56' 18" S | 125° 46' 40" E | |
| Bloodwood Creek | 18° 4' 52" S | 123° 59' 20" E | |
| Bloodwood Creek | 16° 40' 21" S | 128° 43' 12" E | |
| Bloodwood Creek | 17° 10' 23" S | 125° 55' 26" E | |
| Bloodwood Creek | 23° 26' 9" S | 115° 58' 18" E | |
| Blucher Brook | 34° 14' 19" S | 115° 48' 39" E | |
| Blue Bar Creek | 23° 44' 8" S | 117° 3' 20" E | |
| Blue Billy Creek | 23° 23' 18" S | 116° 24' 2" E | |
| Blue Dress Creek | 17° 46' 38" S | 127° 6' 47" E | |
| Blue Duck Creek | 29° 49' 35" S | 122° 2' 26" E | |
| Blue Gum Creek | 34° 50' 47" S | 117° 33' 8" E | |
| Bluebush Creek | 23° 25' 38" S | 115° 30' 53" E | |
| Bluff River | 34° 49' 32" S | 118° 23' 57" E | |
| Blyth Creek | 25° 59' 25" S | 125° 27' 52" E | |
| Blythe Creek | 16° 15' 12" S | 125° 27' 45" E | |
| Blyxa Creek | 15° 48' 58" S | 125° 18' 33" E | |
| Boab Creek | 18° 9' 16" S | 125° 44' 26" E | |
| Boab Tree Creek | 17° 23' 47" S | 126° 47' 56" E | |
| Boaiup Creek | 33° 33' 42" S | 120° 13' 31" E | |
| Bobbamindagee Creek | 23° 40' 29" S | 116° 11' 22" E | |
| Bobby Creek | 16° 57' 22" S | 122° 35' 21" E | |
| Bobbymia Creek | 23° 48' 31" S | 120° 53' 10" E | |
| Bockaring Creek | 33° 21' 16" S | 117° 28' 44" E | |
| Boggy Creek | 34° 40' 3" S | 116° 1' 41" E | |
| Bolbelup Creek | 34° 17' 28" S | 116° 56' 43" E | |
| Bolganup Creek | 34° 37' 16" S | 117° 56' 28" E | |
| Bolgart Brook | 31° 17' 43" S | 116° 29' 24" E | |
| Boll Creek | 17° 16' 43" S | 128° 31' 31" E | |
| Bollonine Brook | 31° 27' 6" S | 116° 42' 46" E | |
| Bolton Creek | 24° 7' 35" S | 116° 23' 36" E | |
| Bonana Creek | 21° 39' 20" S | 119° 24' 32" E | |
| Bond Creek | 29° 0' 5" S | 115° 28' 30" E | |
| Bondini Creek | 23° 58' 59" S | 117° 8' 49" E | |
| Bonnie Creek | 21° 58' 21" S | 120° 2' 5" E | |
| Bonnymidgup Creek | 33° 31' 8" S | 120° 5' 33" E | |
| Bonybaup Gully | 34° 25' 22" S | 116° 30' 22" E | |
| Bonython Creek | 26° 40' 40" S | 122° 53' 57" E | |
| Boobina Creek | 21° 34' 12" S | 119° 44' 35" E | |
| Boodahnewnd Creek | 25° 33' 48" S | 122° 51' 15" E | |
| Boodalyerri Creek | 21° 26' 57" S | 121° 1' 24" E | |
| Boodarboorina Creek | 20° 32' 33" S | 117° 59' 40" E | |
| Boodarrie Creek | 20° 20' 51" S | 118° 27' 4" E | |
| Boodjidup Brook | 34° 0' 45" S | 114° 59' 54" E | |
| Boodrah Creek | 26° 29' 19" S | 117° 23' 31" E | |
| Bookabunna Creek | 21° 9' 8" S | 120° 32' 59" E | |
| Bookaburra Creek | 25° 26' 56" S | 115° 44' 26" E | |
| Bookingarra Creek | 20° 49' 16" S | 117° 36' 3" E | |
| Bookoodoo Creek | 26° 6' 34" S | 121° 56' 44" E | |
| Boolanalling Gully | 33° 22' 40" S | 117° 38' 35" E | |
| Boolathanna Creek | 24° 33' 7" S | 113° 35' 1" E | |
| Boolgeeda Creek | 22° 31' 15" S | 116° 36' 16" E | |
| Boomer Brook | 32° 37' 0" S | 115° 58' 40" E | |
| Boomer Gully | 33° 52' 35" S | 116° 39' 52" E | |
| Boonadgin Brook | 32° 37' 6" S | 117° 1' 25" E | |
| Boonanachi Creek | 23° 34' 42" S | 118° 29' 45" E | |
| Boonanarring Brook | 31° 16' 15" S | 115° 50' 39" E | |
| Boonawarrup Creek | 34° 31' 29" S | 117° 52' 40" E | |
| Boondadup River | 34° 12' 49" S | 119° 32' 17" E | |
| Boondamana Creek | 21° 41' 51" S | 121° 6' 39" E | |
| Boondawari Creek | 23° 37' 13" S | 121° 39' 10" E | |
| Boonjading Brook | 31° 28' 3" S | 116° 46' 9" E | |
| Boonmull Brook | 31° 57' 50" S | 116° 58' 24" E | |
| Boorara Brook | 34° 40' 51" S | 116° 13' 13" E | |
| Booree Creek | 24° 55' 24" S | 115° 32' 34" E | |
| Boornamulla Creek | 25° 27' 13" S | 116° 9' 58" E | |
| Booroothunty Creek | 24° 9' 52" S | 115° 35' 31" E | |
| Boothendarra Creek | 30° 19' 51" S | 115° 27' 5" E | |
| Booyeema Creek | 21° 22' 54" S | 116° 27' 34" E | |
| Booyeemala Creek | 21° 30' 3" S | 116° 43' 8" E | |
| Bordah Creek | 23° 51' 51" S | 115° 25' 16" E | |
| Border Creek | 15° 24' 14" S | 129° 0' 0" E | |
| Bore Creek | 20° 33' 57" S | 118° 38' 14" E | |
| Boree Gully | 33° 44' 36" S | 116° 33' 37" E | |
| Borodale Creek | 28° 11' 1" S | 122° 9' 33" E | |
| Boronia Gully | 34° 0' 12" S | 115° 34' 9" E | |
| Boronia Gully | 34° 3' 30" S | 116° 10' 47" E | |
| Boronia Gully | 33° 50' 55" S | 116° 0' 57" E | |
| Bottle Creek | 29° 13' 40" S | 120° 37' 38" E | |
| Bottle Tree Creek | 16° 49' 11" S | 128° 12' 3" E | |
| Bottle Tree Creek | 16° 26' 55" S | 126° 44' 3" E | |
| Bottom Creek | 16° 24' 55" S | 124° 51' 7" E | |
| Bough Shed Creek | 17° 20' 59" S | 126° 6' 19" E | |
| Bough Shed Creek | 17° 2' 37" S | 125° 14' 50" E | |
| Bouldara Creek | 25° 33' 54" S | 122° 41' 38" E | |
| Boundary Creek | 33° 56' 35" S | 118° 59' 38" E | |
| Boundary Creek | 16° 37' 30" S | 127° 5' 37" E | |
| Boundyne Gully | 33° 1' 43" S | 117° 18' 38" E | |
| Bourkes Gully | 31° 57' 4" S | 116° 8' 48" E | |
| Bow River | 34° 59' 23" S | 116° 57' 17" E | |
| Bow River | 16° 36' 52" S | 128° 38' 43" E | |
| Bowelup Creek | 34° 12' 48" S | 116° 57' 22" E | |
| Bowes River | 28° 24' 42" S | 114° 27' 8" E | |
| Box Creek | 29° 29' 22" S | 122° 16' 39" E | |
| Box Gully | 25° 4' 13" S | 115° 14' 16" E | |
| Boxer Gully | 33° 43' 0" S | 115° 22' 29" E | |
| Boxhall Creek | 34° 58' 30" S | 116° 50' 7" E | |
| Boyagerring Brook | 31° 33' 0" S | 116° 28' 8" E | |
| Boyagin Creek | 32° 24' 14" S | 116° 49' 43" E | |
| Boyamine Creek | 33° 35' 9" S | 117° 18' 24" E | |
| Boyce Creek | 29° 28' 59" S | 121° 57' 50" E | |
| Boyd Creek | 17° 51' 54" S | 124° 52' 6" E | |
| Boyercutty Brook | 31° 50' 2" S | 116° 40' 9" E | |
| Boyerine Creek | 33° 27' 51" S | 117° 17' 25" E | |
| Boyning Gully | 32° 37' 4" S | 117° 37' 44" E | |
| Boyup Brook | 33° 50' 15" S | 116° 23' 43" E | |
| Brady Creek | 23° 6' 53" S | 115° 6' 3" E | |
| Bramley Brook | 33° 55' 12" S | 115° 4' 44" E | |
| Breakneck Creek | 33° 37' 52" S | 115° 51' 22" E | |
| Bream Gorge | 18° 13' 26" S | 128° 0' 51" E | |
| Breen Creek | 21° 36' 57" S | 119° 32' 37" E | |
| Breera Brook | 31° 26' 45" S | 115° 55' 39" E | |
| Bremer River | 34° 20' 22" S | 119° 19' 2" E | |
| Bremla Creek | 15° 12' 3" S | 127° 52' 4" E | |
| Bridgeman Brook | 32° 45' 53" S | 115° 58' 1" E | |
| Bridget Creek | 21° 40' 56" S | 120° 22' 36" E | |
| Brigham Creek | 16° 53' 0" S | 125° 21' 14" E | |
| Brill Creek | 21° 5' 23" S | 116° 40' 51" E | |
| Brill Creek | 16° 24' 27" S | 126° 52' 30" E | |
| Brim Creek | 18° 14' 56" S | 128° 1' 4" E | |
| Britton Gully | 33° 36' 39" S | 115° 41' 17" E | |
| Brockman Creek | 21° 2' 11" S | 119° 52' 14" E | |
| Brockman Creek | 16° 4' 9" S | 127° 9' 39" E | |
| Brockman Creek | 25° 58' 26" S | 122° 21' 30" E | |
| Brockman Hay Cutting Creek | 21° 19' 29" S | 119° 46' 44" E | |
| Brockman River | 30° 46' 53" S | 116° 7' 31" E | |
| Brockman River | 31° 41' 5" S | 116° 6' 59" E | |
| Brockman River | 16° 17' 23" S | 125° 0' 22" E | |
| Brook Creek | 17° 32' 54" S | 128° 42' 37" E | |
| The Brook | 33° 53' 32" S | 119° 1' 19" E | |
| The Brook | 33° 54' 43" S | 118° 58' 9" E | |
| Brooking Creek | 18° 11' 8" S | 125° 35' 3" E | |
| Brooklyn Creek | 31° 27' 10" S | 116° 24' 17" E | |
| Brookman Waters | 21° 38' 45" S | 128° 42' 42" E | |
| Broom Gully | 32° 43' 32" S | 119° 3' 48" E | |
| Broome Creek | 17° 20' 30" S | 125° 10' 24" E | |
| Brophy Creek | 19° 4' 56" S | 128° 48' 20" E | |
| Brown Creek | 22° 20' 47" S | 121° 1' 42" E | |
| Bruce Creek | 14° 44' 16" S | 126° 12' 15" E | |
| Brumby Creek | 24° 9' 35" S | 118° 41' 26" E | |
| Brumby Creek | 21° 37' 54" S | 121° 11' 37" E | |
| Brunswick River | 33° 17' 27" S | 115° 43' 37" E | |
| Bryce Creek | 16° 30' 31" S | 126° 25' 51" E | |
| Buayanyup River | 33° 41' 49" S | 115° 14' 25" E | |
| Bubba Ngundi Creek | 27° 8' 49" S | 119° 7' 22" E | |
| Bubbagundy Creek | 25° 9' 52" S | 117° 0' 34" E | |
| Bubbawalyee Creek | 23° 15' 17" S | 118° 6' 26" E | |
| Buchanan Creek | 17° 15' 32" S | 128° 36' 19" E | |
| Buchanan River | 33° 12' 25" S | 117° 13' 26" E | |
| Budjan Creek | 21° 36' 58" S | 119° 44' 53" E | |
| Buffalo Creek | 18° 2' 54" S | 128° 33' 33" E | |
| Bugle Tree Creek | 31° 52' 51" S | 116° 8' 23" E | |
| Bukardi Creek | 23° 33' 27" S | 118° 12' 31" E | |
| Buldania Creek | 34° 44' 56" S | 116° 11' 16" E | |
| Bulgarene Creek | 20° 11' 53" S | 119° 12' 49" E | |
| Bulka Creek | 19° 7' 40" S | 126° 19' 1" E | |
| Bull Brook | 32° 24' 15" S | 116° 4' 56" E | |
| Bull Creek | 16° 16' 23" S | 128° 55' 49" E | |
| Bull Creek | 16° 20' 5" S | 126° 14' 46" E | |
| Bull Creek | 32° 2' 17" S | 115° 51' 26" E | |
| Bull Creek | 33° 58' 22" S | 116° 15' 6" E | |
| Bull Creek | 16° 51' 33" S | 125° 36' 9" E | |
| Bull Creek | 34° 3' 6" S | 116° 33' 58" E | |
| Bull Creek | 18° 3' 17" S | 128° 51' 11" E | |
| Bull Creek | 28° 3' 19" S | 122° 6' 37" E | |
| Bull Creek | 17° 6' 59" S | 125° 38' 12" E | |
| Bull Swamp Creek | 17° 4' 35" S | 128° 58' 41" E | |
| Bulla Nulla Creek | 15° 31' 31" S | 127° 51' 0" E | |
| Bulldog Creek | 22° 46' 5" S | 121° 8' 21" E | |
| Buller River | 28° 38' 14" S | 114° 36' 12" E | |
| Bullock Hole Creek | 29° 12' 50" S | 121° 44' 36" E | |
| Bulls Brook | 31° 40' 0" S | 115° 58' 49" E | |
| Bummer Creek | 28° 57' 24" S | 121° 39' 19" E | |
| Bunbury Gully | 33° 53' 21" S | 116° 6' 44" E | |
| Bundabunda Creek | 23° 37' 44" S | 118° 59' 0" E | |
| Bundellarung Creek | 24° 6' 36" S | 119° 48' 2" E | |
| Bundolgwa Creek | 15° 28' 49" S | 124° 40' 36" E | |
| Bungabandi Creek | 27° 29' 27" S | 114° 19' 50" E | |
| Bungaroo Creek | 21° 48' 19" S | 116° 17' 41" E | |
| Bungarragut Creek | 17° 22' 1" S | 123° 10' 25" E | |
| Bungulla Creek | 31° 37' 4" S | 117° 32' 39" E | |
| Bunjarra Creek | 29° 18' 57" S | 121° 56' 13" E | |
| Bunjoon Creek | 16° 25' 11" S | 125° 12' 21" E | |
| Bunmardie Creek | 21° 8' 44" S | 120° 52' 7" E | |
| Bunnerbirrup Brook | 34° 17' 5" S | 116° 17' 53" E | |
| Burabadji Creek | 31° 11' 49" S | 116° 45' 18" E | |
| Burabadji Creek North | 31° 12' 5" S | 116° 48' 53" E | |
| Burges Brook | 31° 48' 41" S | 116° 47' 35" E | |
| Burlabup Creek | 33° 45' 37" S | 120° 23' 12" E | |
| Bussell Brook | 33° 27' 4" S | 116° 0' 58" E | |
| Butchers Gully | 18° 22' 33" S | 127° 51' 29" E | |
| Butler Creek | 22° 35' 4" S | 122° 23' 49" E | |
| Butler Creek | 16° 2' 58" S | 128° 57' 58" E | |
| Butlers Creek | 16° 3' 0" S | 128° 57' 59" E | |
| Butterabby Creek | 28° 40' 39" S | 115° 23' 11" E | |
| Button Creek | 18° 42' 40" S | 128° 29' 8" E | |
| Button Creek | 17° 24' 29" S | 126° 16' 59" E | |
| Byangerup Creek | 34° 15' 59" S | 118° 17' 1" E | |
| Byong Creek | 20° 52' 58" S | 116° 31' 2" E | |

== See also ==
- Geography of Western Australia
