= Banksia Creek =

Banksia Creek is the name of three watercourses in Australia:

- Banksia Creek (Queensland)
- Banksia Creek (Victoria)
- Banksia Creek (Western Australia)
