= Locke Estate =

Nature reserve in Western Australia

- The Holy Mile
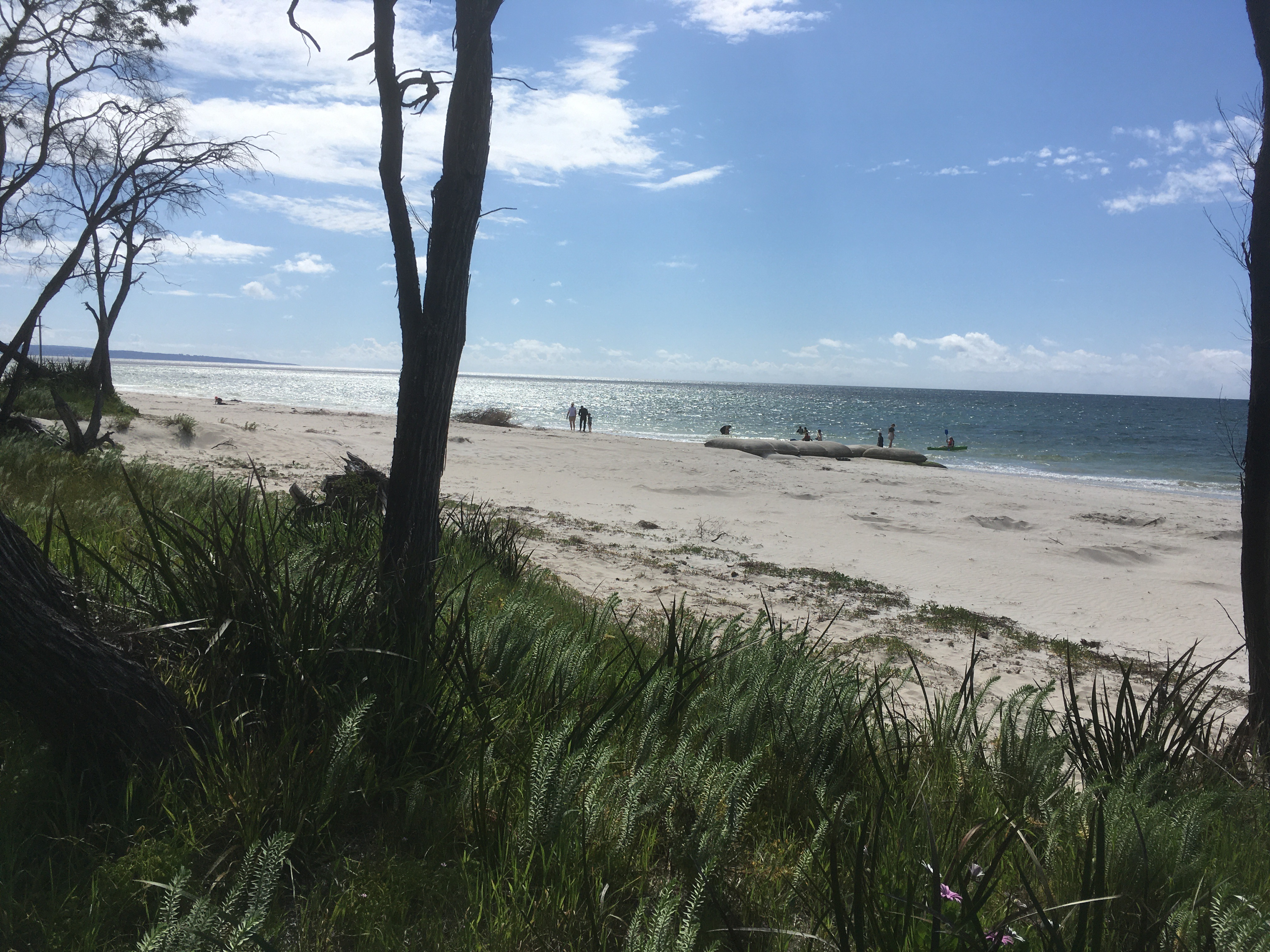

- Location within Western Australia
- Location: Siesta Park, Western Australia
- Nearest city: Busselton
- Coordinates: 33.66°S 115.24°E
- Area: 37.5 ha (93 acres)
- Established: 29 August 1947
- Governing body: City of Busselton

The Locke Estate is an area of Crown land located on the coast of Geographe Bay near Caves Road approximately 10 kilometres (6 mi) west of the town of Busselton, Western Australia. The estate comprises 16 private campsites, all currently leased to not-for-profit organizations. These include religious groups, youth associations like the Scouts, educational institutions, and community service providers. Historically, the presence of church groups amongst the leasees has led to the area being known locally as the "Holy Mile". The estate is notable for providing private, low-cost camping and group holiday accommodation along one of the most expensive beach front locations in the south west of Western Australia.

== Estate management ==
Designated as A-class Reserve No. 22674 in August 1947, the estate is afforded the highest level of protection available to Crown land. The land is vested in the City of Busselton for management purposes. The City is empowered to lease land for a maximum period of 21 years, subject to Ministerial approval. The use of land is restricted to "Recreational campsites and group holiday accommodation".

The estate is broken into 16 discrete land parcels around 2 hectares in area. Leases balance private camping with coastal management and the protection of the natural habitat of the Western Ringtail Possum. All campsites are currently subject to uniform 21-years leases, expiring in 2032.

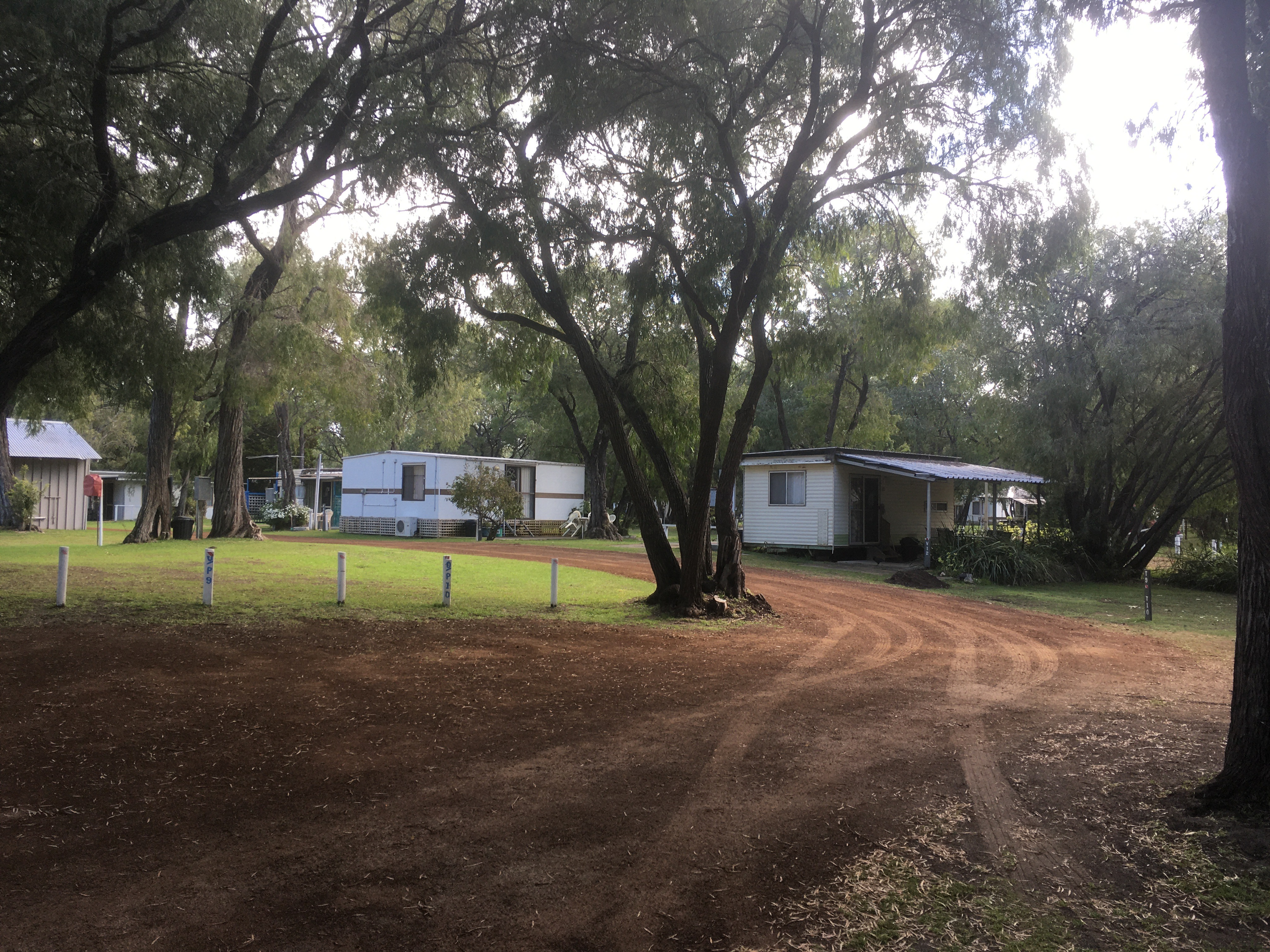
Some campsites within the estate contain chalets, park homes and caravans

== History ==
The Locke Estate originally formed part of a larger landholding in the Sussex Land District, granted to the pioneer Locke Family, after whom the current estate has been named. First acquired by the Western Australian government in 1920 for a soldier settlement scheme, the estate was subsequently designated an A-Class Reserve in August 1947 for the purposes of "Camping and Recreation".. This reflected growing informal use of the area for that purpose.

The estate was originally under nominal management of the State Gardens Board. The first application to lease land was received from the South West Girl Guides Association in 1953. This led to the vesting of the estate in the Busselton Roads Board on 2 April 1954. Between 1954 and 1977 another 16 churches and non-profit organisations obtained approximately 2 hectare leases within the estate.

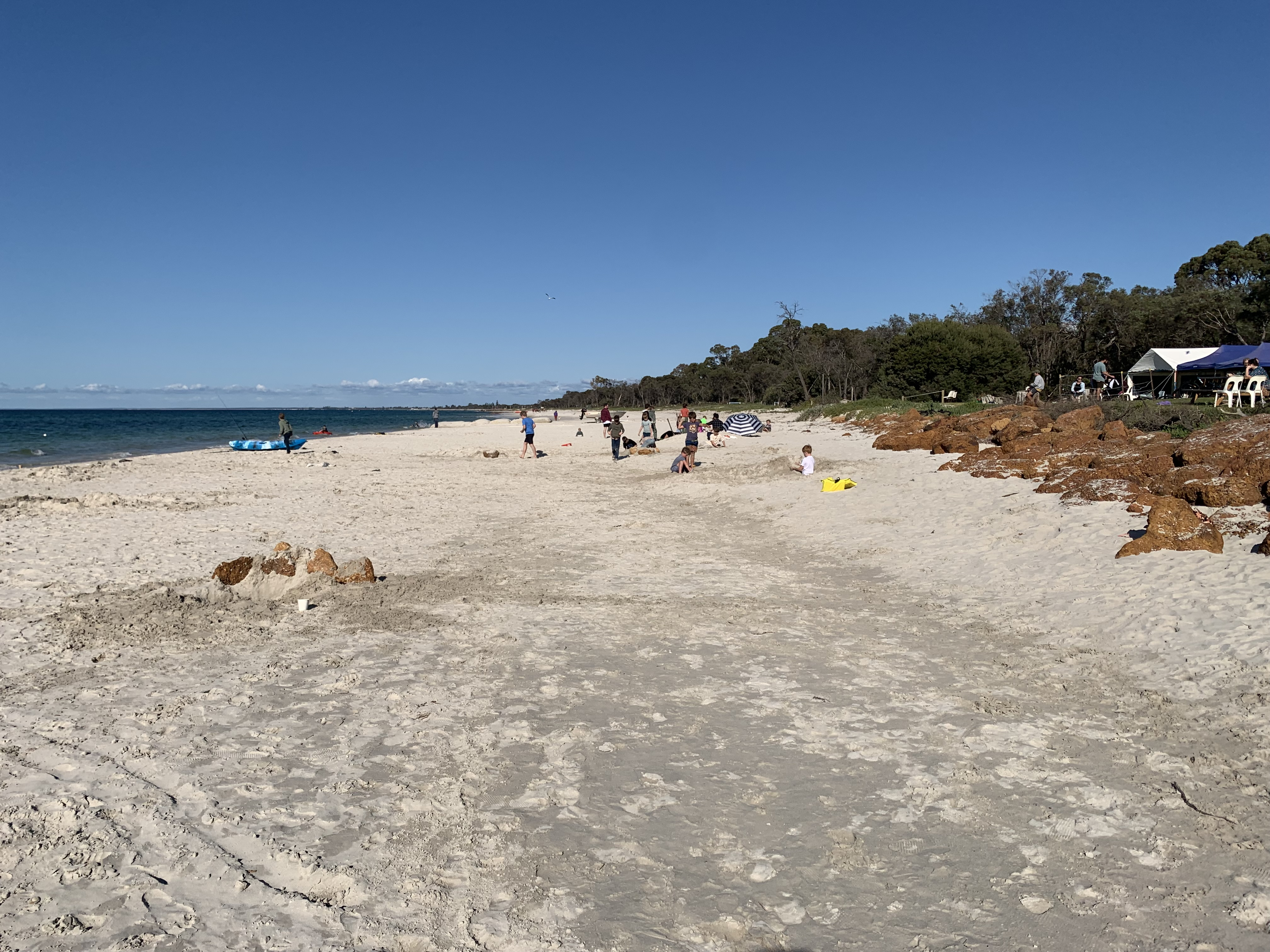
View of the beach from Campsite 6 within the Locke Estate

Between 1965 and 1967, a large rock groyne was built at the western end of the estate in two stages by the Public Works Department. It stabilized the beachfront immediately to its west but further contributed to the erosion of beachfront to the east, within the estate.

Over several decades, many leasees developed the campsites with permanent buildings including chalets and dormitory accommodation. To accommodate this, the Minister for Lands amended the purpose of the reserve to "Recreational Camp Sites and Group Holiday Accommodation" on 10 October 1986.

From 1 December 1990 all campsite leasees were moved onto new, uniform 21-year leases. On 25 July 2002 the Minister for Lands reduced the area of the Class A Reserve 22674 dedicated for "Recreational Camp Sites and Group Holiday Accommodation" from 53.2 to 37.7 hectares.

Between 2008 and 2010 the City of Busselton commenced a review of the estate future by engaging with the community, existing leaders and the City's elected councillors. A redevelopment concept was developed that proposed consolidating the 16 existing community campsites into five larger sites while converting approximately one-quarter of the 37.5-hectare area into a commercial caravan park to enhance tourism facilities. This became the subject of widespread media coverage, leading to Council voting to maintain the status quo in August 2008.

Five of the original churches and organisations elected to vacate their site at the end of the current lease. The City issued 16 uniform leases to new and existing leasees commencing 1 December 2011.

== Locke Nature Reserve ==
On 11 February 1992, a 222 hectare portion of the original Locke family landholding located south of Caves Road was gazetted as the Locke Nature Reserve for the purpose of wildlife and bird conservation. In 2018, a bridge was built from the reserve across the Buayanyup River to link two previously isolated populations of western ringtail possums.
