= Boundary Creek (Glen Fernaigh River, Clarence Valley) =

Coordinates: 30°16′S 152°30′E

Location
- Country: Australia
- State: New South Wales
- Region: NSW North Coast (IBRA), Northern Rivers
- Local government area: Clarence Valley

Physical characteristics
- Source
  - location: near Barren Mountain
- Mouth: confluence with the Glen Fernaigh River
- Length: 19 km (12 mi)

Basin features
- River system: Clarence River catchment

The Boundary Creek, a perennial stream of the Clarence River catchment, is located in the Northern Rivers region of New South Wales, Australia.

== Course and features ==
Boundary Creek rises about 5.6 kilometres (3.5 mi) northwest of Barren Mountain. The river flows generally northeast before reaching its confluence with the Glen Fernaigh River.

== See also ==
- Rivers of New South Wales
- List of rivers of New South Wales (A-K)
- List of rivers of Australia
