= Barratta Creek =

Creek in North Queensland, Australia

Barratta
- Location of Barratta Creek mouth in Queensland
- Etymology: Indigenous: chain of lagoons in the area

Location
- Country: Australia
- State: Queensland
- Region: North Queensland

Physical characteristics
- Source: Leichhardt Range
  - location: below Bunkers Hill
  - coordinates: 19°58′52″S 146°56′47″E
  - elevation: 224 m (735 ft)
- Mouth: Bowling Green Bay, Coral Sea
  - coordinates: 19°25′09″S 147°15′07″E
  - elevation: 0 m (0 ft)
- Length: 109 km (68 mi)
- Basin size: 1,831 km^{2} (707 sq mi) to 1,210.8 km^{2} (467.5 sq mi)
- Discharge
  - location: Near mouth
  - average: 5.64 m^{3}/s (199 cu ft/s) to 8.6 m^{3}/s (270 GL/a)

The Barratta Creek is a creek in North Queensland, Australia.

The headwaters of the creek rise below Bunkers Hill in the Leichhardt Range in the Great Dividing Range and flow in a north easterly direction. The creek continues through mostly uninhabited country past Woodhouse Mountain travelling almost parallel with the Haughton River eventually crossing the Bruce Highway and entering the Bowling Green Bay Conservation Park then discharging into Bowling Green Bay near Jerona, before flowing into the Coral Sea. The river descends 224 metres (735 ft) over its 109-kilometre (68 mi) course.

The catchment area of the creek occupies an 1,831 square kilometres (707 sq mi), of which an area of 173 square kilometres (67 sq mi) is composed of estuarine wetlands. The mean annual flow of the creek is 178 gigalitres (3.92×10^{10} imp gal; 4.70×10^{10} US gal). The riparian habitat of the catchment, particularly the northern end, has declined since the 1970s as a result of clearing of the floodplain forest to plant sugarcane. Most of the catchment area is still used for pastoralism, particularly grazing land for cattle.

The name of the creek is thought to be derived from the local Aboriginal dialect from the name for a chain of lagoons found in the area.

== See also ==
- List of rivers of Australia § Queensland
