= Nangahrah Creek =

Coordinates: 30°23′S 150°44′E

Location
- Country: Australia

Physical characteristics
- Source
  - location: New South Wales

Nangahrah Creek is a river of the state of New South Wales in Australia.

== See also ==
- List of rivers of Australia
