= Barigan Creek =

Coordinates: 32°36′06″S 150°01′20″E

Location
- Country: Australia
- State: New South Wales
- Region: NSW North Coast (IBRA), Central Tablelands
- Local government area: Mid-Western Region

Physical characteristics
- Source: Great Dividing Range
  - location: near Mount Stormy
  - elevation: 771 m (2,530 ft)
- Mouth: confluence with the Wollar Creek
  - location: east of Gulgong
  - elevation: 387 m (1,270 ft)
- Length: 24 km (15 mi)

Basin features
- River system: Hunter River catchment

Barigan Creek, a watercourse of the Hunter River catchment, is located in the Central Tablelands region of New South Wales, Australia.

== Course ==
The Barigan Creek rises below Mount Stormy, on the eastern slopes of the Great Dividing Range. The river flows generally north northwest before reaching its confluence with the Wollar Creek, east of the town of Gulgong. The river descends 384 metres (1,260 ft) over its 24 kilometres (15 mi) course.

== See also ==
- List of rivers of Australia
- List of rivers of New South Wales (A-K)
- Rivers of New South Wales
