= Hartland River =

Perennial river in Victoria, Australia

Hartland
- Location of the Hartland River mouth in Victoria

Location
- Country: Australia
- State: Victoria
- Region: South East Corner (IBRA), East Gippsland
- Local government area: Shire of East Gippsland

Physical characteristics
- Source: Great Dividing Range
  - location: State forest
  - coordinates: 37°39′8″S 148°13′32″E
  - elevation: 208 m (682 ft)
- Mouth: confluence with the Wombat Creek
  - location: between Nowa Nowa and Orbost
  - coordinates: 37°44′26″S 148°15′55″E
  - elevation: 38 m (125 ft)
- Length: 14 km (8.7 mi)

Basin features
- River system: East Gippsland catchment

The Hartland River is a perennial river of the East Gippsland catchment, in the Australian state of Victoria.

== Features and location ==
The Hartland River rises in a state forestry area on part of the Great Dividing Range and flows generally south by southeast before reaching its confluence with the Wombat Creek between Nowa Nowa and Orbost and north of the Princes Highway, in the Shire of East Gippsland. The river descends 170 metres (560 ft) over its 14-kilometre (8.7 mi) course.

== See also ==
- List of rivers of Australia
