= Mulla Mulla Cowal =

Coordinates: 31°41′S 147°10′E

Location
- Country: Australia

Physical characteristics
- Source
  - location: New South Wales

Mulla Mulla Cowal is a river of the state of New South Wales in Australia.

== See also ==
- List of rivers of Australia
