= O'Briens Creek =

Coordinates: 35°14′S 147°30′E

Location
- Country: Australia

Physical characteristics
- Source
  - location: New South Wales

O'Briens Creek is a river of the state of New South Wales in Australia.

== See also ==
- List of rivers of Australia
