= Little Rubicon River =

Little Rubicon
- Location of the Little Rubicon River mouth in Victoria
- Etymology: Latin: rubico

Location
- Country: Australia
- State: Victoria
- Region: South Eastern Highlands bioregion (IBRA), Northern Country/North Central
- LGA: Murrindindi

Physical characteristics
- Source: Victorian Alps, Great Dividing Range
  - location: below Blue Range
  - coordinates: 37°20′33″S 145°50′15″E
- Mouth: confluence with the Rubicon River
  - location: in a remote state forestry area
  - coordinates: 37°20′59″S 145°50′58″E

Basin features
- River system: Goulburn Broken catchment, Murray-Darling basin

The Little Rubicon River, an inland perennial river of the Goulburn Broken catchment, part of the Murray-Darling basin, is located in the lower South Eastern Highlands bioregion and Northern Country/North Central regions of the Australian state of Victoria. The headwaters of the Little Rubicon River rise on the western slopes of the Victorian Alps and descend to flow into the Rubicon River.

== Location and features ==
The Little Rubicon River rises from the Great Dividing Range below the Blue Range east of the Cathedral Ranges State Park, and flows southeast, fueled by runoff from the Blue and Cerberean Ranges before reaching its confluence with the Rubicon River in a remote state forestry area, southwest of the town of Rubicon.

== See also ==
- List of rivers of Australia § Victoria
