= Red River (Victoria) =

Red
- Red River in Victoria

Location
- Country: Australia
- State: Victoria
- Region: South East Corner (IBRA), East Gippsland
- Local government area: Shire of East Gippsland

Physical characteristics
- Source
  - location: Croajingolong National Park
  - elevation: 152 m (499 ft)
- Mouth: Bass Strait
  - location: southwest of Sandpatch Point
  - coordinates: 37°43′30″S 149°33′49″E
  - elevation: 0 m (0 ft)
- Length: 7 km (4.3 mi)

Basin features
- National park: Croajingolong NP

The Red River is a perennial river with no defined major catchment, in the East Gippsland region of the Australian state of Victoria.

== Course and features ==
The Red River rises in remote country in the Benedore River Reference Area in the Croajingolong National Park, and flows generally south by east, before reaching its mouth with Bass Strait southwest of Sandpatch Point in the Shire of East Gippsland. The river descends 152 metres (499 ft) over its 7 kilometres (4.3 mi) course.

== See also ==
- List of rivers of Australia
