= Benedore River =

Benedore
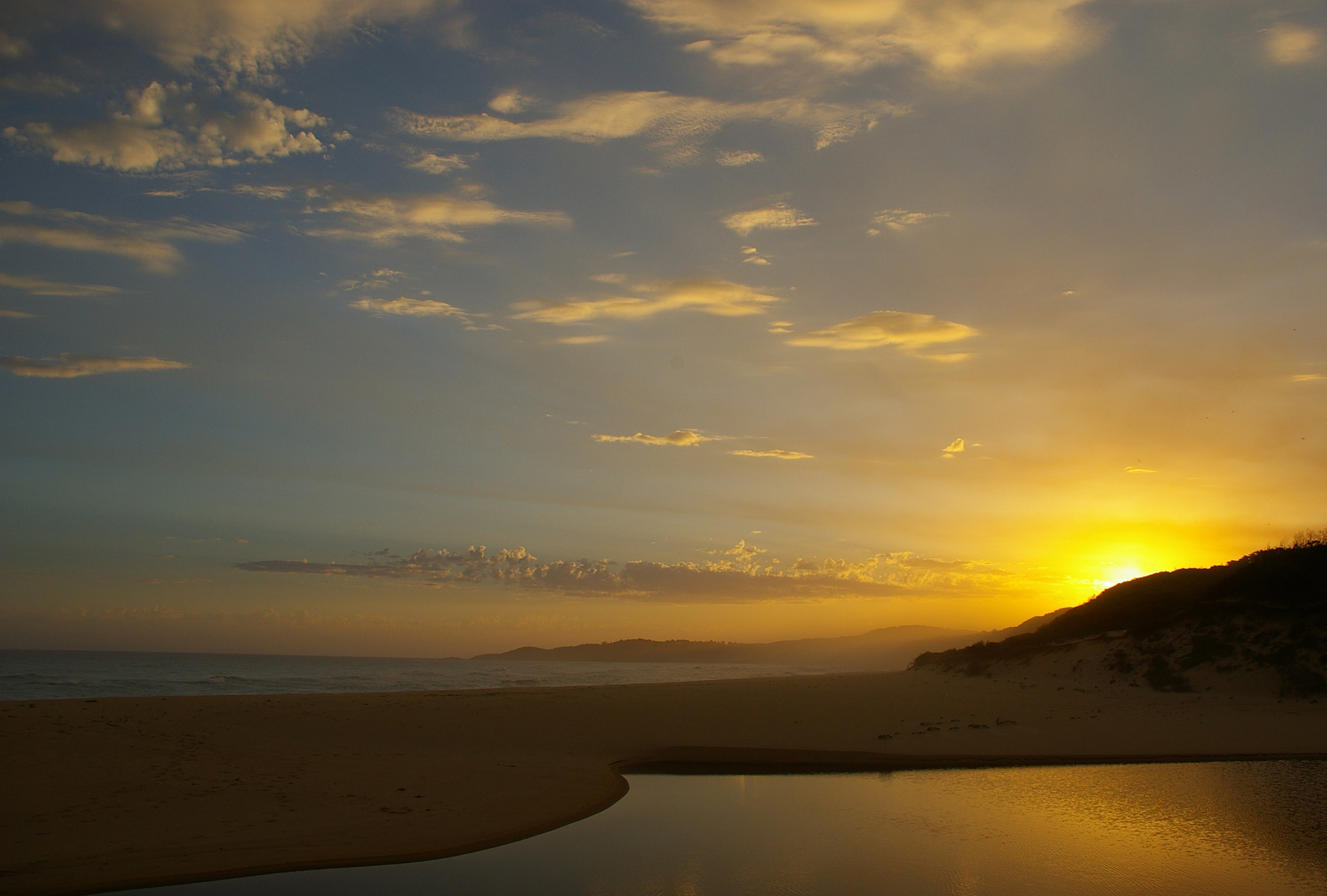
- Sunset over the Sandpatch Wilderness Area, Benedore River Estuary. Croajingolong National Park, Victoria

- Benedore River in Victoria

Location
- Country: Australia
- State: Victoria
- Region: South East Corner (IBRA), East Gippsland
- Local government area: Shire of East Gippsland

Physical characteristics
- Source
  - location: Benedore River Reference Area
  - elevation: 184 m (604 ft)
- Mouth: Bass Strait
  - location: Croajingolong National Park
  - coordinates: 37°41′57″S 149°37′20″E
  - elevation: 0 m (0 ft)
- Length: 11 km (6.8 mi)

Basin features
- National park: Croajingolong NP

The Benedore River is a perennial river with no defined major catchment, in the East Gippsland region of the Australian state of Victoria.

== Course and features ==
The Benedore River rises in the Benedore River Reference Area and flows generally south southeast, through the Seal Creek Reference Area, before reaching its mouth with Bass Strait within the Croajingolong National Park in the Shire of East Gippsland. The river descends 184 metres (604 ft) over its 11-kilometre (6.8 mi) course.

The four beaches at the river mouth, south of Mallacoota, form a naturally occurring dam resulting in a 1 kilometre (0.62 mi) long, narrow, winding lake behind the southeast sea-facing beaches.

== See also ==
- List of rivers of Australia § Victoria
