= Towns River =

Towns
- Location of the Towns River mouth in the Northern Territory
- Etymology: Robert Towns

Location
- Country: Australia
- Territory: Northern Territory

Physical characteristics
- Source
  - location: Arnhem Land, Australia
  - elevation: 29 m (95 ft)
- Mouth
  - location: Limmen Bight, Australia
  - coordinates: 14°55′46″S 135°25′31″E
  - elevation: 0 m (0 ft)
- Length: 84 km (52 mi)
- Basin size: 5,432 km^{2} (2,097 sq mi)
- Discharge
  - average: 15.8 m^{3}/s (560 cu ft/s)

The Towns River is a river in the Northern Territory, Australia.

The headwaters of the river rise in Arnhem Land and flow in an easterly direction and eventually discharges into the Limmen Bight within the Gulf of Carpentaria.

The estuary formed at the river mouth is tidal in nature and in near pristine condition. The estuary at the river mouth occupies an area of 54.8 hectares (135 acres) of open water. It is river dominated in nature with a tide dominated delta having single channel and is surrounded by an area of 109.4 hectares (270 acres) covered with mangroves.

The catchment occupies an area of 5,432 square kilometres (2,097 sq mi) and is situated between the Roper River catchment to the north and west and the Limmen Bight River catchment to the south. The river has a mean annual outflow of 500 gigalitres (654,000,000 cu yd),

Ten species of fish are found in the river including; glassfish, barred grunter, fly-specked hardyhead, salmon catfish, mouth almighty, barramundi, rainbowfish and bony bream.

Believed to have been named by the explorer Francis Cadell during his expedition of 1868, he named it for Robert Towns, the person that the city of Townsville is also named after. The name also appears on Goyder's pastoral compilation of 1888.

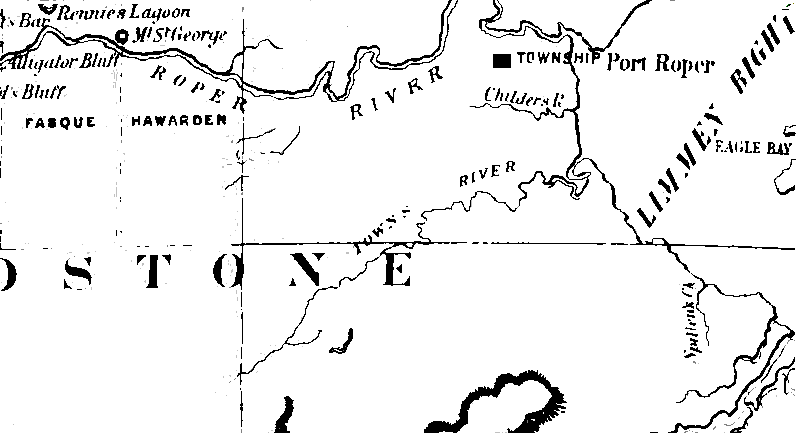
Map of the Towns River area, in the Northern Territory based on the 1886 map by John Sands

== See also ==
- List of rivers of Australia § Northern Territory
