= Goromuru River =

River in Northern Territory, Australia

Goromuru Gurrumuru, Gurrumurru
- Location of the Goromuru River mouth in the Northern Territory
- Etymology: Dhuwal language

Location
- Country: Australia
- Territory: Northern Territory

Physical characteristics
- Source
  - location: Frederick Hills, Arnhem Land, Australia
  - elevation: 15 m (49 ft)
- Mouth
  - location: Arnhem Bay, Australia
  - coordinates: 12°28′39″S 136°13′6″E
  - elevation: 0 m (0 ft)
- Length: 30 km (19 mi)
- Basin size: 1,026 km^{2} (396 sq mi)

The Goromuru River is a river in the Northern Territory in Australia.

The headwaters are found in the valleys of the Frederick Hills in Arnhem Land and flow in a northerly direction through uninhabited country for a distance of 30 kilometres (19 mi) until discharging into Arnhem Bay and eventually the Arafura Sea.

The catchment area of the river is 1,026 square kilometres (396 sq mi).

The estuary formed at the river mouth is tidal in nature and in near pristine condition. The estuary occupies an area of 53.5 hectares (132 acres) of open water. It is tide dominated in nature having a single channel and is surrounded by an area of 10.5 square kilometres (4 sq mi) covered with mangroves.

== See also ==
- List of rivers of Australia § Northern Territory
