= Tabulam Rivulet =

Coordinates: 28°53′S 152°34′E

Location
- Country: Australia

Physical characteristics
- Source
  - location: New South Wales

Tabulam Rivulet is a river of the state of New South Wales in Australia.

== See also ==
- List of rivers of Australia
