= Calder River (Victoria) =

Perennial river in Victoria, Australia

Calder
- Location of the Calder River mouth in Victoria
- Etymology: River Calder in England

Location
- Country: Australia
- State: Victoria
- Region: South East Coastal Plain (IBRA), The Otways
- Local government area: Colac Otway Shire

Physical characteristics
- Source: Otway Ranges
  - location: near Bateman Ridge
  - coordinates: 38°42′29″S 143°34′16″E
  - elevation: 393 m (1,289 ft)
- Mouth: confluence with the Aire River
  - location: south of Lake Craven
  - coordinates: 38°47′52″S 143°28′43″E
  - elevation: 0 m (0 ft)
- Length: 14 km (8.7 mi)

Basin features
- River system: Corangamite catchment
- National park: Port Campbell National Park

The Calder River is a perennial river of the Corangamite catchment, in the Otways region of the Australian state of Victoria.

== Location and features ==
The Calder River rises in the Otway Ranges in southwest Victoria, near Bateman Ridge and flows generally south by west through the Port Campbell National Park towards the settlement of Horden Vale where the river enters Lake Costin and then Lake Craven, before reaching its confluence with the Aire River shortly before the Aire enters Bass Strait, northwest of Cape Otway. From its highest point, the Calder River descends 393 metres (1,289 ft) over its 14-kilometre (8.7 mi) course.

== Etymology ==
The river was named by surveyor George Smythe after the River Calder in Yorkshire, England, similarly a tributary of the River Aire.

== See also ==
- List of rivers of Australia § Victoria
