= Nadgigomar Creek =

Coordinates: 35°01′S 149°55′E

Location
- Country: Australia

Physical characteristics
- Source
  - location: New South Wales

Nadgigomar Creek is a river of the state of New South Wales in Australia.

== See also ==
- List of rivers of Australia
