= Mulga Creek =

Coordinates: 30.30354°S 146.06612°E

Location
- Country: Australia

Physical characteristics
- Source
  - location: New South Wales

Mulga Creek is a river of the state of New South Wales in Australia.

== See also ==
- List of rivers of Australia
