= Coorongooba Creek =

Coordinates: 33°47′S 150°29′E

Coorongooba

Location
- Country: Australia
- State: New South Wales
- Region: Sydney Basin (IBRA), Central Tablelands
- Municipality: City of Lithgow

Physical characteristics
- Source: Mount Boonbourwa, Great Dividing Range
  - location: Wollemi National Park
  - elevation: 621 m (2,037 ft)
- Mouth: confluence with the Capertee River
  - location: east of Glen Davis
  - elevation: 323 m (1,060 ft)
- Length: 25 km (16 mi)

Basin features
- River system: Hawkesbury-Nepean catchment
- Tributaries
  - left: Running Stream Creek
- National park: Wollemi NP

The Coorongooba Creek, a perennial stream of the Hawkesbury-Nepean catchment, is located in the Central Tablelands region of New South Wales, Australia.

== Course ==
The Coorongooba Creek (officially designated as a river) rises west of Mount Boonbourwa in the Great Dividing Range, in remote country east of Kandos and north-east of Glen Alice. The river flows generally south, joined by one minor tributary, before reaching its confluence with the Capertee River, 4 kilometres (2.5 mi) east of Glen Davis. The river descends 299 metres (981 ft) over its 25-kilometre (16 mi) course; and is entirely contained within the Wollemi National Park.

== See also ==
- List of rivers of Australia
- List of rivers of New South Wales (A–K)
- Rivers of New South Wales
