= Parma Creek =

Coordinates: 34°58′S 150°36′E

Location
- Country: Australia

Physical characteristics
- Source
  - location: New South Wales

Parma Creek is a river of the state of New South Wales in Australia.

== See also ==
- List of rivers of Australia
