= Yeerung River =

Yeerung Yerung
- Mouth of the Yeerung River in Victoria

Location
- Country: Australia
- State: Victoria
- Region: South East Corner (IBRA), East Gippsland
- LGA: Shire of East Gippsland

Physical characteristics
- Source: Confluence of West Branch and East Branch of the Yeerung River
  - location: Cape Conran Coastal Park
  - elevation: 36 m (118 ft)
- Mouth: Bass Strait
  - location: Cape Conran Coastal Park
  - coordinates: 37°47′28″S 148°46′37″E
  - elevation: 0 m (0 ft)
- Length: 3 km (1.9 mi)

Basin features
- National park: Cape Conran CP

The Yeerung River is a perennial river located in the East Gippsland region of the Australian state of Victoria.

== Course and features ==
Formed by the confluence of the Yeerung River West Branch and the Yeerung River East Branch, the Yeerung River rises in the Cape Conran Coastal Park, and flows generally south before reaching its mouth with Bass Strait, east of Cape Conran in the Shire of East Gippsland. The river descends 36 metres (118 ft) over its 3-kilometre (1.9 mi) course.

The west branch of the river rises near the locality of Bellbird Creek at the junction of the Princes Highway and Sydneham Inlet Road, with a southerly course of 12 kilometres (7.5 mi); while the east branch of the river rises west of the Sydneham Inlet Road, with a south westerly course of 11 kilometres (6.8 mi).

The Yeerung River sub-catchment area is managed by the East Gippsland Catchment Management Authority.

== See also ==
- List of rivers of Australia
