= Fraser River (Western Australia) =

River in Kimberley region of Western Australia

Coordinates: 17°21′0″S 123°18′38″E

Location
- Country: Australia

Physical characteristics
- Source
  - elevation: 138 metres (453 ft)
- Mouth
  - location: King Sound
  - elevation: sea level
- Length: 70 km (43 mi)
- Basin size: 2,752 km^{2} (1,063 sq mi)

The Fraser River is a river in the Kimberley region of Western Australia.

The river rises northwest of Mount Jowlaenger and flows east passing through some permanent pools such as Ungalete Pool and Lowangun Pool before discharging into King Sound.

The only tributary of the Fraser is Bungarragut Creek.

The explorer Alexander Forrest visited the river in 1879. Forrest named the river after Malcolm Fraser, the Commissioner of Crown Lands at the time.

The traditional owners of the areas around the river are the Nyikina.
