= Cowriga Creek =

Cowriga Conibul, Browns
- Location of the Cowriga Creek mouth in New South Wales

Location
- Country: Australia
- State: New South Wales
- Region: South Eastern Highlands (IBRA), Central West
- LGA: Blayney

Physical characteristics
- Source
  - location: Huntley Trig. Station
  - coordinates: 33°25′9″S 149°8′16″E
- Mouth: confluence with Belubula River
  - location: northwest of Carcoar
  - coordinates: 33°35′54″S 149°7′46″E
- Length: 30 km (19 mi)

Basin features
- River system: Lachlan sub-catchment, Murray–Darling basin

The Cowriga Creek, a mostly–perennial river that is part of the Lachlan sub-catchment of the Murrumbidgee catchment within the Murray–Darling basin, is located in the Central West region of New South Wales, Australia.

== Course and features ==
The Cowriga Creek (technically a river) rises about 5 kilometres (3.1 mi) southeast of Huntley trigonometric station west of Spring Hill, and flows generally south and south by west before reaching its confluence with the Belubula River northwest of Carcoar.

== See also ==
- List of rivers of New South Wales (A–K)
- Rivers of New South Wales
