= Banksia Gully =

Watercourse in Western Australia

Banksia Gully is a watercourse in Western Australia, nominally located at 32°24′S 116°10′E, about 10 kilometres (6.2 mi) south east of Jarrahdale in the Shire of Serpentine-Jarrahdale. It is about 2 kilometres (1.2 mi) long, and empties into the reservoir of Serpentine Dam.

== General references ==
- Banksia Gully in the Gazetteer of Australia
