= Yarrabandai Creek =

Yarrabandai Creek is a Creek in New South Wales. It is located at 33°05′54″S 147°34′04″E and is in Forbes Shire. The creek starts at an elevation of 289m at an elevation of 254m and flows over 60 kilometres (37 mi) near the town of Trundle, New South Wales. It is also the name of a nearby Railway Station on the Broken Hill railway line.
