= Blakney Creek =

Blakney Head of Blakney Creek
- Location of the Blakney Creek mouth in New South Wales

Location
- Country: Australia
- State: New South Wales
- Region: South Eastern Highlands (IBRA), South Western Slopes
- LGA: Upper Lachlan
- Town: Binalong

Physical characteristics
- Source: Great Dividing Range
  - location: north of Yass Junction
  - coordinates: 34°44′23″S 149°0′51″E
  - elevation: 605 m (1,985 ft)
- Mouth: confluence with Lachlan River
  - location: near Tarcoola
  - coordinates: 34°34′57″S 149°9′15″E
  - elevation: 495 m (1,624 ft)
- Length: 31 km (19 mi)

Basin features
- River system: Lachlan sub-catchment, Murray–Darling basin

The Blakney Creek, a mostly–perennial river that is part of the Lachlan sub-catchment of the Murrumbidgee catchment within the Murray–Darling basin, is located in the South Western Slopes region of New South Wales, Australia.

== Course and features ==
The Blakney Creek (technically a river) rises north northeast of the Yass Junction, on the south western slopes of the Great Dividing Range, and flows generally northeast before reaching its confluence with the Lachlan River near Tarcoola. The creek descends 110 metres (360 ft) over its 31-kilometre (19 mi) course.

== See also ==
- List of rivers of New South Wales (A–K)
- Rivers of New South Wales
