= Jerra Jerra Creek =

Perennial stream of the Murray River

Jerra Jerra Cookardinia
- Location of the Jerra Jerra Creek mouth in New South Wales

Location
- Country: Australia
- State: New South Wales
- Region: Riverina (IBRA)
- LGA: Greater Hume
- Towns: Cookardinia

Physical characteristics
- Source: Great Dividing Range
  - location: near Paper Forest
  - coordinates: 35°27′49″S 147°14′58″E
  - elevation: 365 m (1,198 ft)
- Mouth: confluence with the Billabong Creek
  - location: north east of Fellow Hills Railway Station
  - coordinates: 35°39′32″S 147°13′18″E
  - elevation: 241 m (791 ft)
- Length: 27 km (17 mi)

Basin features
- River system: Murray catchment, Murray–Darling basin

The Jerra Jerra Creek, a perennial stream of the Murray River catchment within the Murray–Darling basin, is located in the Riverina region of New South Wales, Australia.

== Course and features ==
The Jerra Jerra Creek (technically a river) rises on the Great Dividing Range, south southeast of The Rock, and flows generally south through the locality of Cookardinia before reaching its confluence with the Billabong Creek north east of Fellow Hills Railway Station, near the midpoint between Holbrook and Culcairn. The creek descends 125 metres (410 ft) over its 27-kilometre (17 mi) course.

== See also ==
- List of rivers of New South Wales (A–K)
- Rivers of New South Wales
