= Banksia Creek (Queensland) =

Coordinates: 24°28′S 151°35′E

- Location of Banskia Creek in Queensland

Location
- Country: Australia
- State: Queensland
- Region: Gladstone Region

Banksia Creek is a watercourse in South East Queensland. It is located on the mainland in the area of Miriam Vale. The name refers to the plant genus Banksia, which grows in the area.

There is also a creek on Hinchinbrook Island that is commonly referred to by that name, although it is not gazetted as such.

== See also ==
- List of rivers of Australia
