= Mitchell River (Western Australia) =

River in Western Australia

Coordinates: 14°43′15″S 125°38′21″E

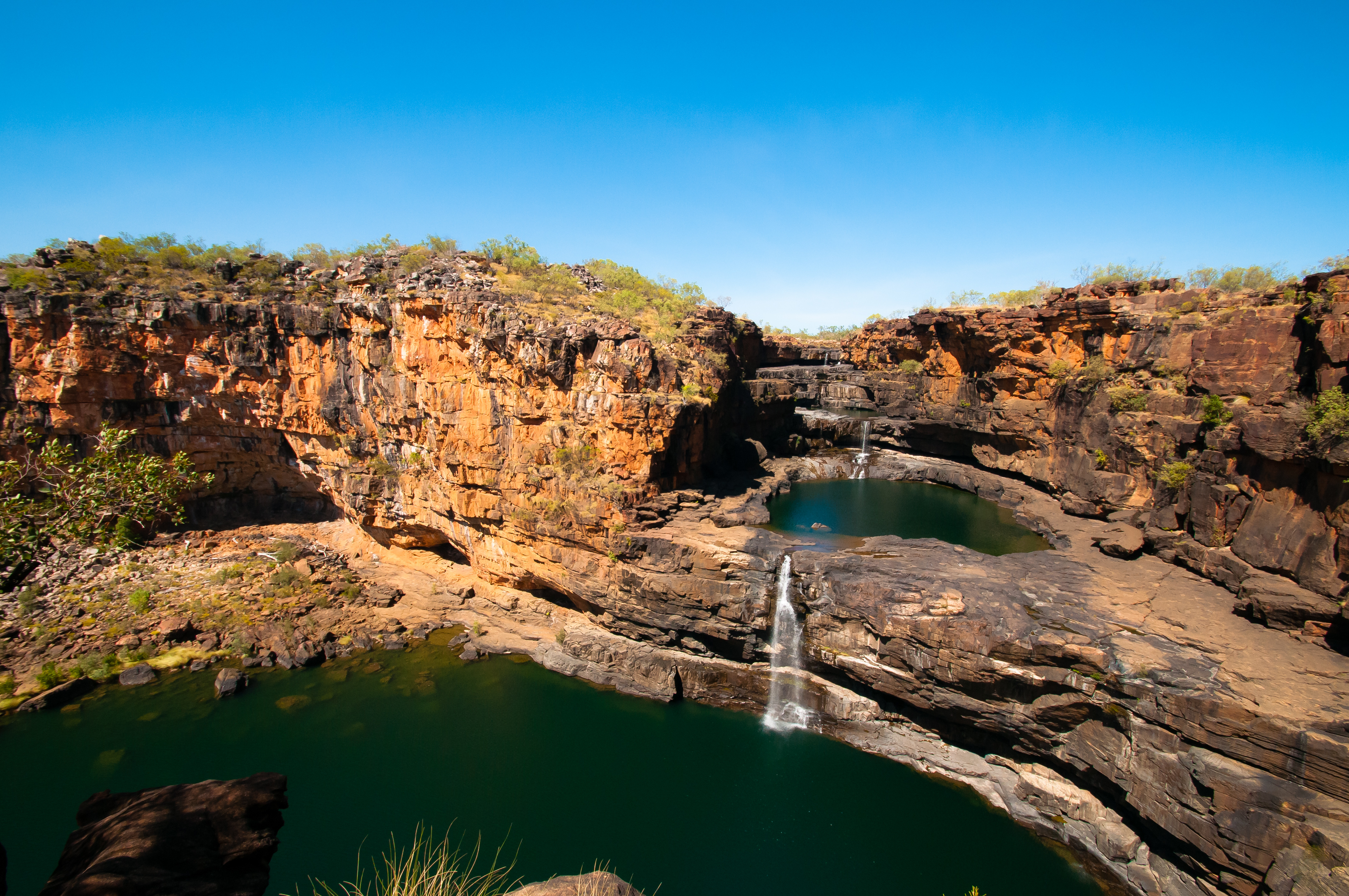
- Mitchell Falls

Location
- Country: Australia

Physical characteristics
- Source
  - elevation: 441 metres (1,447 ft)
- Mouth
  - location: Walmsley Bay
  - elevation: sea level
- Length: 117 km (73 mi)
- Basin size: 2,955 km^{2} (1,141 sq mi)

The Mitchell River is a river in the Kimberley region of Western Australia.

The river rises northeast of Sharp Hill and flows in a north-westerly direction until discharging into the Indian Ocean via Walmsley Bay near Port Warrender.

The best known feature of the river is Mitchell Falls located within the Mitchell River National Park, a three tiered series of drops with a combined height of nearly 80 metres (260 ft).

In 1921 the river was named after Sir James Mitchell the Premier of Western Australia by surveyor William Eastman.

Nine species of freshwater fish are known to inhabit the waters of the Mitchell River.

There is another Mitchell River located in Western Australia that is a tributary of the Hay River in the south of the state.
