= Bulla Creek =

Bulla Bullock
- Location of the Bulla Creek mouth in New South Wales

Location
- Country: Australia
- State: New South Wales
- Region: South Eastern Highlands (IBRA), South West Slopes
- LGA: Hilltops

Physical characteristics
- Source: Great Dividing Range
  - location: south of Monteagle
  - coordinates: 34°11′48″S 148°20′29″E
  - elevation: 437 m (1,434 ft)
- Mouth: confluence with Burrangong Creek
  - location: between Young and Grenfell
  - coordinates: 34°7′25″S 148°13′54″E
  - elevation: 335 m (1,099 ft)
- Length: 22 km (14 mi)

Basin features
- River system: Lachlan sub-catchment, Murray–Darling basin

The Bulla Creek, a mostly–perennial river that is part of the Lachlan sub-catchment of the Murrumbidgee catchment within the Murray–Darling basin, is located in the South West Slopes region of New South Wales, Australia. The Bulla Creek is only connected to the Murray Darling basin when the Bland Creek and both the Lachlan and Murrumbidgee Rivers are in flood.

== Course and features ==
The Bulla Creek (technically a river) rises below Monteagle, on the south western slopes of the Great Dividing Range, and flows generally north northwest and southwest before reaching its confluence with the Burrangong Creek between Young and Grenfell. The Burrangong Creek is a tributary of the Bland Creek. The Bulla Creek descends 101 metres (331 ft) over its 22-kilometre (14 mi) course.

== See also ==
- List of rivers of New South Wales (A-K)
- Rivers of New South Wales
