= Cullinga Creek =

Cullinga
- Location of the Cullinga Creek mouth in New South Wales

Location
- Country: Australia
- State: New South Wales
- Region: South Eastern Highlands (IBRA), South Western Slopes
- LGA: Cootamundra-Gundagai

Physical characteristics
- Source: Great Dividing Range
  - location: east of Cootamundra
  - coordinates: 34°38′03″S 148°11′12″E
- Mouth: confluence with Muttama Creek
  - location: southeast of Brawlin
  - coordinates: 34°45′35″S 148°04′32″E
- Length: 23 km (14 mi)

Basin features
- River system: Murrumbidgee catchment, Murray–Darling basin

The Cullinga Creek, a mostly–perennial river that is part of the Murrumbidgee catchment within the Murray–Darling basin, is located in the South Western Slopes region of New South Wales, Australia.

== Course and features ==
The Cullinga Creek (technically a river) rises about 16 kilometres (9.9 mi) east of Cootamundra, on the southwest slopes of the Great Dividing Range, and flows generally south southwest for about 23 kilometres (14 mi) before reaching its confluence with the Muttama Creek about 3 kilometres (1.9 mi) southeast of Brawlin. The Muttama Creek is a tributary of the Murrumbidgee River.

== See also ==
- List of rivers of New South Wales (A–K)
- Rivers of New South Wales
