= Leichhardt Range =

Mountain range in Australia

Leichhardt
- Location within Queensland

Naming
- Etymology: Ludwig Leichhardt

Geography
- Country: Australia
- State: Queensland
- Range coordinates: 20°03′14″S 146°55′36″E

Geology
- Rock age: Ordovician to Late Carboniferous
- Rock type: Granite

The Leichhardt Range, part of the Great Dividing Range, is a mountain range in North Queensland, Australia.

The range runs parallel with the coast about 170 kilometres (106 mi) west of Mackay and has an average elevation of 355 metres (1,165 ft). It is composed of a series of rugged hills with folded granite and granodiorite. The age of the rocks vary from Ordovician (490 to 434 million years) to Late Carboniferous (325 to 298 million years). These are interspersed with areas of volcanic rhyolite of the Cambrian Period (545 to 490 million years) at the southern edge.

The range is named after the explorer Ludwig Leichhardt.

== See also ==
- List of mountains in Queensland
