= Glen Fernaigh River =

River in New South Wales, Australia

Coordinates: 30°15′S 152°30′E

Glen Fernaigh River Glen Fernaigh Creek

Location
- Country: Australia
- State: New South Wales
- Region: NSW North Coast (IBRA), Northern Rivers
- Municipality: Clarence Valley

Physical characteristics
- Source: Dorrigo Plateau, Great Dividing Range
  - location: near Hernani, west of Dorrigo
  - elevation: 1,224 m (4,016 ft)
- Mouth: confluence with the Nymboida River
  - location: near Tyringham, northwest of Dorrigo

Basin features
- River system: Clarence River catchment

Glen Fernaigh River, a perennial river of the Clarence River catchment, is located in the Northern Rivers region of New South Wales, Australia.

== Course and features ==
Glen Fernaigh River rises on the Dorrigo Plateau within the Great Dividing Range near Hernani, west of Dorrigo, and flows generally northeast then east before reaching its confluence with the Nymboida River near Tyringham, northwest of Dorrigo.

== See also ==
- Rivers of New South Wales
- List of rivers of New South Wales (A–K)
- List of rivers of Australia
