= Banksia Creek (Victoria) =

River in Victoria, Australia

Banksia Creek is a watercourse in Victoria. It is located at 39°07′S 146°22′E at the southern tip of Wilsons Promontory. The name refers to the plant genus Banksia, which grows in the area.
