= Bowning Creek =

River in Australia

Bowning
- Location of the Bowning Creek mouth in New South Wales

Location
- Country: Australia
- State: New South Wales
- Region: South Eastern Highlands (IBRA), South Western Slopes, Riverina
- LGA: Yass Valley
- Town: Bowning

Physical characteristics
- Source: Great Dividing Range
  - location: near Goondah
  - coordinates: 34°43′28″S 148°48′22″E
- Mouth: confluence with Yass River
  - location: west of Yass
  - coordinates: 34°50′33″S 148°48′8″E
- Length: 15 km (9.3 mi)

Basin features
- River system: Murrumbidgee sub-catchment, Murray–Darling basin

Bowning Creek, a mostly–perennial river that is part of the Murrumbidgee catchment in the Murray–Darling basin, is in the South Western Slopes and Riverina regions of New South Wales, Australia.

== Course ==
Bowning Creek (technically a river) rises north of Bowning, on the south western slopes of the Great Dividing Range, and flows generally south by west before reaching its confluence with the Yass River west of Yass.

The creek is crossed by the Hume Highway south of Bowning.

== See also ==
- List of rivers of New South Wales (A–K)
- Rivers of New South Wales
