= Jeir Creek =

Perennial river

Jeir Oakey
- Location of the Jeir Creek mouth in New South Wales

Location
- Country: Australia
- State: New South Wales
- Region: South Eastern Highlands (IBRA), South Western Slopes
- LGAs: Yass Valley

Physical characteristics
- Source: Great Dividing Range
  - location: below Mount Spring
  - coordinates: 35°5′48″S 149°5′17″E
  - elevation: 786 m (2,579 ft)
- Mouth: Murrumbidgee River
  - location: northwest of Hall
  - coordinates: 35°4′32″S 148°55′13″E
  - elevation: 378 m (1,240 ft)
- Length: 26 km (16 mi)

Basin features
- River system: Murrumbidgee catchment, Murray–Darling basin

The Jeir Creek, a perennial river that is part of the Murrumbidgee catchment within the Murray–Darling basin, is located in the South Western Slopes region of New South Wales, Australia.

== Course and features ==
The Jeir Creek (technically a river) rises below Mount Spring, part of the Great Dividing Range, northeast of the village of Hall and approximately 6 kilometres (3.7 mi) north of the northwestern border between New South Wales and the Australian Capital Territory. The creek flows generally northwest by west then west by south before reaching its confluence with the Murrumbidgee River southwest of the village of Hall. The creek descends 408 metres (1,339 ft) over its 26-kilometre (16 mi) course.

The river is crossed by the Barton Highway north of the village of Hall.

The Jeir Creek Winery, located in the area, is named after the creek.

== See also ==
- List of rivers of New South Wales (A–K)
- Rivers of New South Wales
