= Jerrara Creek =

Jerrara Chain of Ponds Creek
- Location of the Jerrara Creek mouth in New South Wales

Location
- Country: Australia
- State: New South Wales
- Region: South Eastern Highlands (IBRA), South Western Slopes
- LGA: Upper Lachlan

Physical characteristics
- Source: Great Dividing Range
  - location: near Wheeo trigonometry station
  - coordinates: 34°29′31″S 149°15′59″E
- Mouth: confluence with Lachlan River
  - location: southeast of Rugby
  - coordinates: 34°26′48″S 149°7′16″E
- Length: 21 km (13 mi)

Basin features
- River system: Lachlan sub-catchment, Murray–Darling basin

The Jerrara Creek, a watercourse that is part of the Lachlan sub-catchment of the Murrumbidgee catchment within the Murray–Darling basin, is located in the South Western Slopes region of New South Wales, Australia.

== Course and features ==
The Jerrara Creek (technically a river) rises on the slopes of the Great Dividing Range north of Gunning near the locality of Wheeo, and flows generally west before reaching its confluence with the Lachlan River southeast of Rugby. The course of the creek is approximately 21 kilometres (13 mi).

== See also ==
- List of rivers of New South Wales (A–K)
- Rivers of New South Wales
