= Kindra Creek =

River in Australia

Kindra
- Location of the Kindra Creek mouth in New South Wales

Location
- Country: Australia
- State: New South Wales
- Region: Riverina (IBRA), South Western Slopes
- LGA: Coolamon

Physical characteristics
- Source: Great Dividing Range
  - location: southwest of Temora
  - coordinates: 34°39′54″S 147°28′17″E
  - elevation: 325 m (1,066 ft)
- Mouth: confluence with the Mimosa Creek to form Redbank Creek
  - location: north of Ganmain
  - coordinates: 34°43′54″S 147°14′23″E
  - elevation: 197 m (646 ft)
- Length: 60 km (37 mi)

Basin features
- River system: Murrumbidgee catchment, Murray–Darling basin

The Kindra Creek, a watercourse that is part of the Murrumbidgee catchment within the Murray–Darling basin, is located in the Riverina and South Western Slopes regions of New South Wales, Australia.

== Course and features ==
The Kindra Creek (technically a river) rises near Warre Warral trigonometry station southwest of Temora, sourced by runoff from the Great Dividing Range. The creek flows generally southwest and then northwest before reaching its confluence with the Mimosa Creek to form Redbank Creek (itself a tributary of a series of watercourses that combine to form an old anabranch of the Murrumbidgee River now part of an irrigation channel of the Murrumbidgee Irrigation Area), north of the locality of Ganmain. The creek descends 128 metres (420 ft) over its 60-kilometre (37 mi) course.

== See also ==
- List of rivers of New South Wales (A–K)
- Rivers of New South Wales
