= Carbunup River =

River in Western Australia

Coordinates: 33°41′43.92″S 115°11′19.31″E

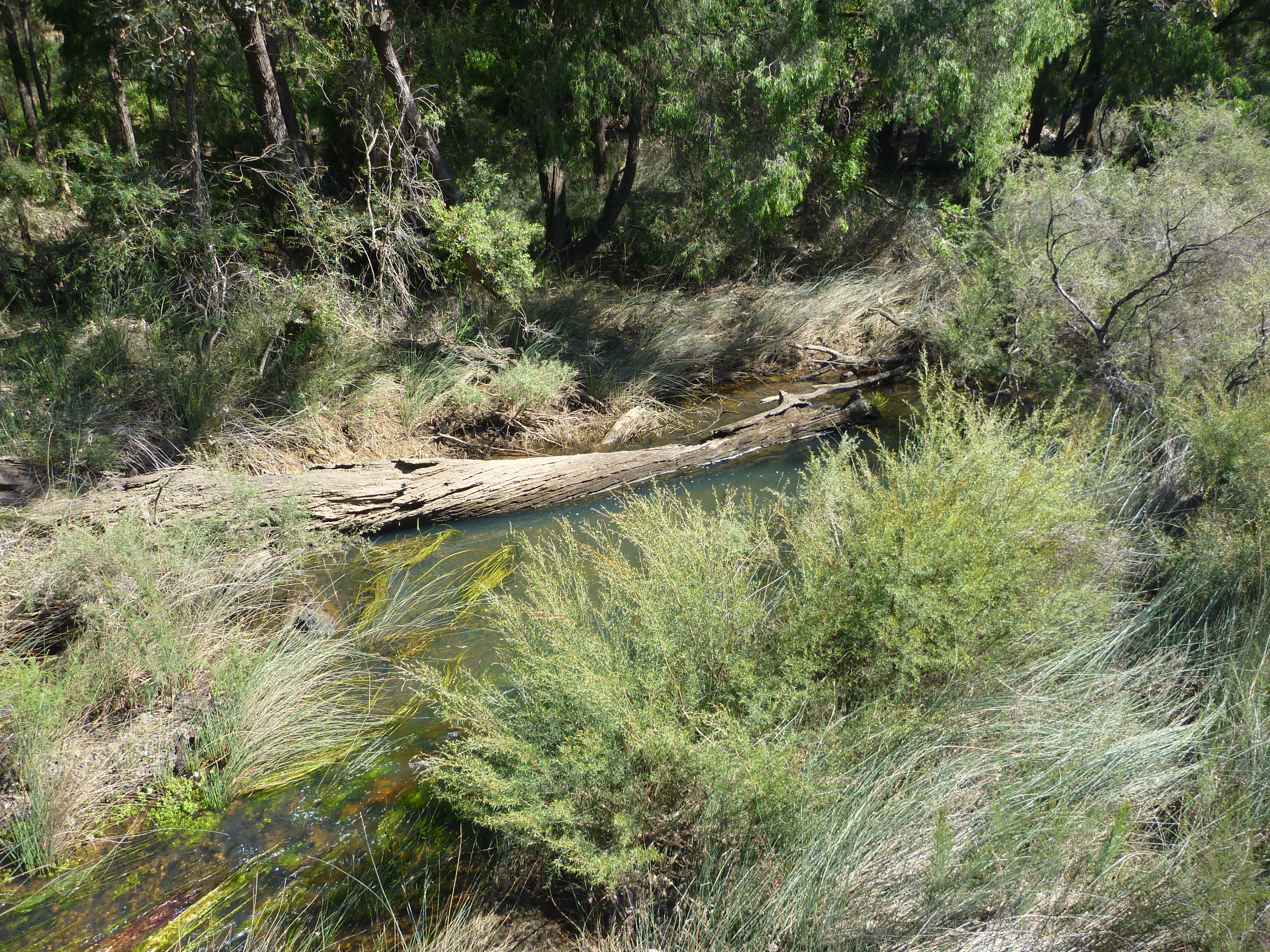
- Carbunup River near Bussell Highway

Location
- Country: Australia

Physical characteristics
- Source
  - location: Whicher Range
  - elevation: 72 metres (236 ft)
- Mouth
  - location: Geographe Bay, Western Australia
- Length: 36 km (22 mi)
- Basin size: 159 km^{2} (61 sq mi)
- Discharge
  - average: 10.8 m^{3}/s (340,000 ML/a; 380 cu ft/s)

The Carbunup River is located in the south-west corner of Western Australia. The mouth of the Carbunup River is approximately 20 kilometres (12 mi) west of Busselton where the river flows into Geographe Bay.

The Carbunup River is 36 kilometres (22 mi) in length and flows north from its headwaters in the Treeton State Forest/Whicher Range in the Shire of Augusta-Margaret River.

The nearest water courses are Mary Brook to the west and Buayanyup River to the east; both of these rivers travel parallel to the Carbunup River. The catchment area is 170 square kilometres (65.6 sq mi) of which 55% is cleared. The Carbunup River is located in the Leeuwin-Naturaliste area where it crosses two physiographic regions, the 15 km wide Swan Coastal Plain and the gently undulating Blackwood Plateau.

The only tributary of the river is Island Brook.

== History ==
The river was originally named Lennox River after Lennox Bussell by Captain John Molloy in 1835. The name was changed to Carbunup River after the local Aboriginal word that means either 'place of a kindly stream', 'place of cormorants' or 'place of the stinkwood thicket'.
