= Buller River (Western Australia) =

River in Western Australia

Coordinates: 28°38′11″S 114°36′18″E

Location
- Country: Australia

Physical characteristics
- Source
  - elevation: 142 metres (466 ft)
- Mouth
  - location: Indian Ocean
  - elevation: sea level
- Length: 10 km (6.2 mi)
- Basin size: 33.9 km^{2} (13.1 sq mi)
- Discharge
  - average: 587.4 megalitres per year (20.74×10^{6} cu ft/a)

The Buller River is a river in the Mid West region of Western Australia, near Geraldton.

The river is a short coastal stream of around 10 km length just to the north of Geraldton, in the Drummond Cove and Oakajee areas. The headwaters of the river are 25 kilometres (16 mi) north of Geraldton. The Buller flows in a southerly direction, initially following the east side of the North West Coastal Highway to a point 4 kilometres (2 mi) north of Drummond Cove, where it turns to the west, to discharge into the Indian Ocean.

== History ==
The Buller River was named on 7 April 1839 by the explorer George Grey while on his second disastrous expedition along the Western Australian coast, probably after Charles Buller M.P., an associate of Edward Gibbon Wakefield and Grey's friend William Hutt (brother of the 2nd Governor of Western Australia, John Hutt), and an active parliamentary proponent of the free colonization of South Australia, Western Australia and New Zealand.
