= Barker River =

River in Kimberley region of Western Australia

Coordinates: 17°19′33″S 124°38′47″E

Location
- Country: Australia

Physical characteristics
- Source
  - location: Mount Matthew
  - elevation: 286 metres (938 ft)
- Mouth
  - location: Lennard River
  - elevation: 59 metres (194 ft)
- Length: 90 km (56 mi)

The Barker River is a river in the Kimberley region of Western Australia.

The headwaters of the river rise north of Mount Matthew and then flow in a southerly direction through Barker Gorge before discharging into the Lennard River, of which it is a tributary.

John Forrest named the river during a survey of the Kimberley in 1883. The river was named after the wife of the Governor Sir Frederick Napier Broome, Lady Mary Anne Barker.

The river has five tributaries: Fletcher River, Talbot Creek, Annie Creek, Mac Creek and Wombarella Creek.
