= Buayanyup River =

River in Western Australia

Coordinates: 33°41′44″S 115°14′25″E

Location
- Country: Australia

Physical characteristics
- Source
  - location: Whicher Range
  - elevation: 60 metres (197 ft)
- Mouth
  - location: Geographe Bay
  - elevation: sea level
- Length: 27 km (17 mi)
- Basin size: 163 km^{2} (63 sq mi)

The Buayanyup River is a river in the South West region of Western Australia.

The headwaters of the river rise in the Whicher Range and flow north crossing the Bussell Highway near Vasse before discharging into Geographe Bay near Abbey about 8 kilometres (5 mi) west of Busselton. The river has three main tributaries of Dawson Gulley, Ironstone Gully and the other is not named. In total the river has a stream length of over 100 kilometres (62 mi). The river and the Carbunup River have fishery resource issues in common.

The river flows through agricultural land that is predominantly used for raising beef and dairy cattle and to a lesser degree plantation timber and viticulture. The area has been settled since 1834 when the Bussell family established a cattle station along the Vasse River. More farming families followed and now over 50% of the catchment is used for cattle farming.

The name of the river was first recorded by a surveyor in 1839 and is Aboriginal in origin but its meaning is unknown.
