= Banksia Creek (Western Australia) =

Watercourse in Western Australia

Coordinates: 33°54′09″S 115°17′43″E

Banksia Creek is a watercourse in Western Australia. It is located about 25 kilometres (16 mi) south of Busselton in the Shire of Augusta-Margaret River. A tributary of Margaret River North, it runs in a westerly direction for about 2 kilometres (1.2 mi) before joining Margaret River North just south of Canebreak Pool. The name refers to the plant genus Banksia, which grows in the area.

== General references ==
- Banksia Creek in the Gazetteer of Australia
