= Buchanan River =

River in Western Australia

Coordinates: 33°12′25″S 117°13′26″E

Location
- Country: Australia

Physical characteristics
- Source
  - location: North East of Wagin
  - elevation: 345 metres (1,132 ft)
- Mouth
  - location: Arthur River
  - elevation: 243 metres (797 ft)
- Length: 35 km (22 mi)

The Buchanan River is a river in the Wheatbelt region of Western Australia.

The river rises in the hills to the southern side of the Yackrkine Range and flows in a westerly direction then past Muggerrugging Rock then it turn to the south-west and discharges into the Arthur River of which it is a tributary between the towns of Piesseville and Wagin.

The river was named in 1835 by the Surveyor General John Septimus Roe, who named it after the London gentleman, Walter Buchanan, who had a strong connection with the fledgling Swan River Colony.

The river's catchment falls within the Blackwood catchment's Beaufort zone as part of the Dellyanine system. The system is composed of undulating rises and low hills on granite and was a wandoo sheoak woodland but has now mostly been cleared for agriculture.
