= Mueller River (Victoria) =

Mueller
- Mueller River in Victoria

Location
- Country: Australia
- State: Victoria
- Region: South East Corner (IBRA), East Gippsland
- Local government area: Shire of East Gippsland

Physical characteristics
- Source: Mount Drummer
  - location: Alfred National Park
  - elevation: 273 m (896 ft)
- Mouth: Bass Strait
  - location: near Point Hicks
  - coordinates: 37°46′44″S 149°19′36″E
  - elevation: 0 m (0 ft)
- Length: 30 km (19 mi)

Basin features
- National parks: Alfred NP, Croajingolong NP

The Mueller River is a perennial river with no defined major catchment, in the East Gippsland region of the Australian state of Victoria.

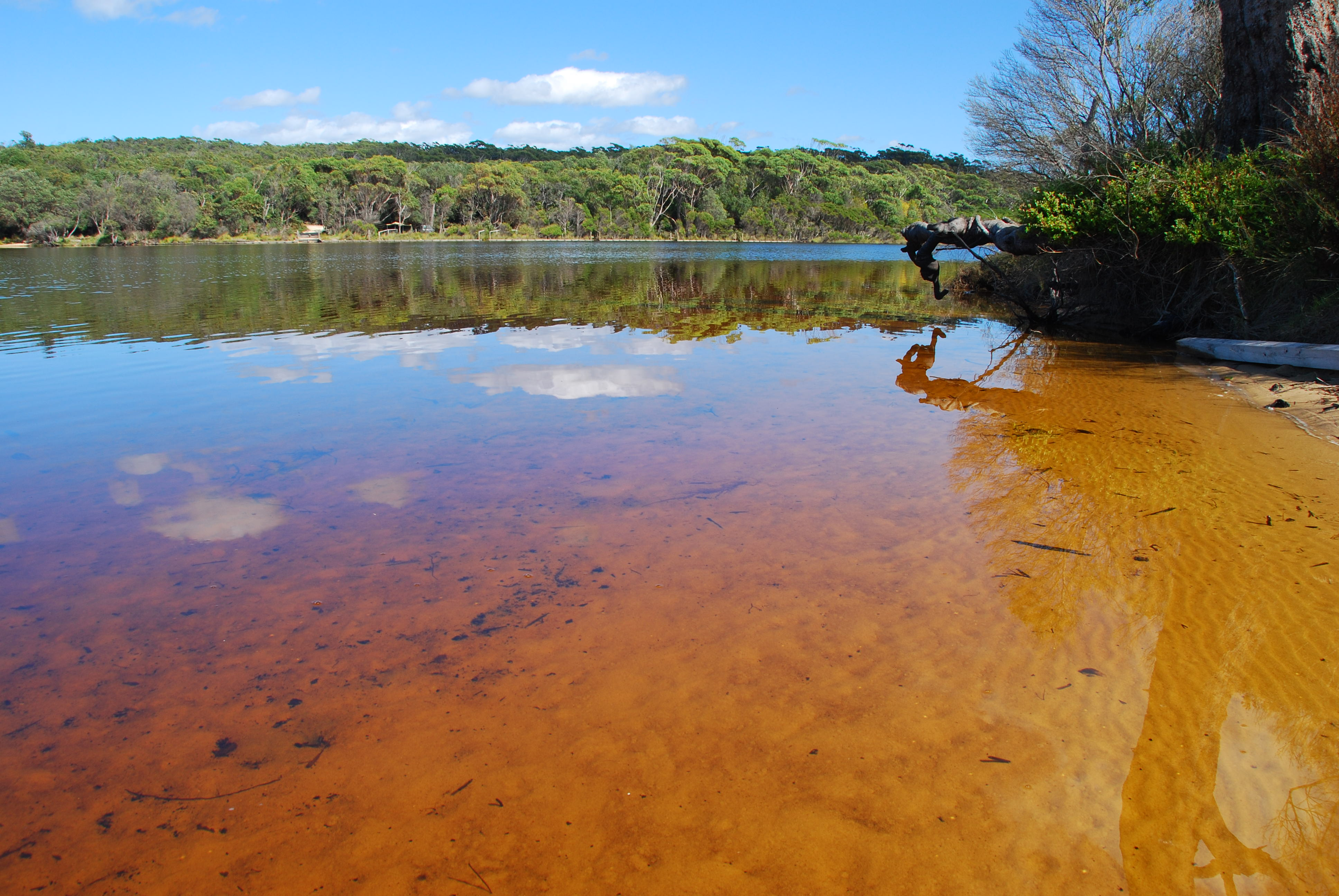

== Course and features ==
The Mueller River rises below Mount Drummer in the Alfred National Park between Cann River and Genoa, and flows generally south through the Croajingolong National Park before reaching its mouth with Bass Strait, east of Point Hicks in the Shire of East Gippsland. The river descends 273 metres (896 ft) over its 30 kilometres (19 mi) course.

The upper reaches of the river is traversed by the Princes Highway.

== See also ==
- List of rivers of Australia
