= Betka River =

Betka
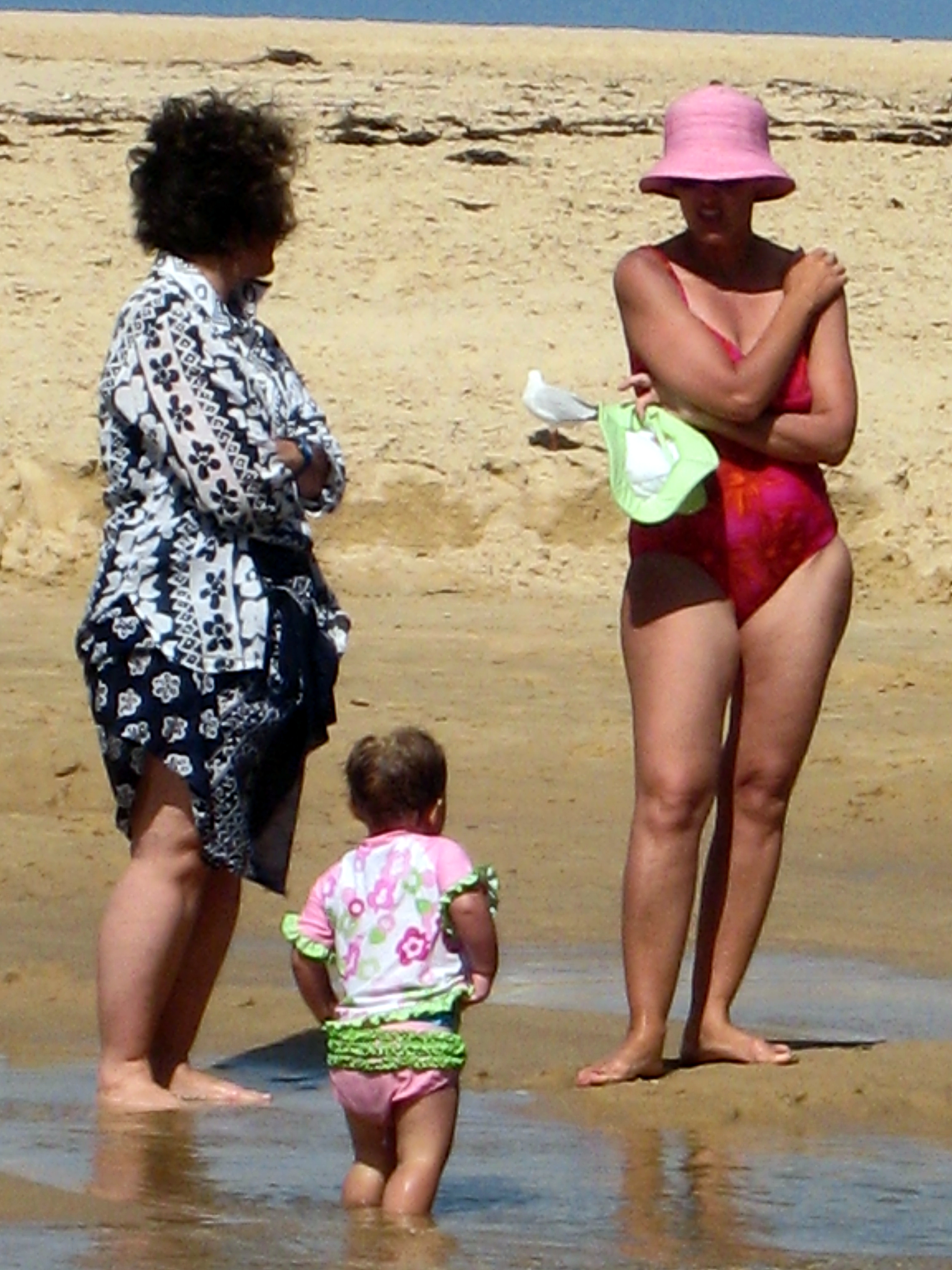

- Bekta River in Victoria

Location
- Country: Australia
- State: Victoria
- Region: South East Corner (IBRA), East Gippsland
- Local government area: Shire of East Gippsland

Physical characteristics
- Source
  - location: Croajingolong National Park
  - elevation: 130 m (430 ft)
- Mouth: Bass Strait
  - location: south of Mallacoota
  - coordinates: 37°35′12″S 149°44′20″E
  - elevation: 0 m (0 ft)
- Length: 32 km (20 mi)

Basin features
- National park: Croajingolong NP

The Betka River is a perennial river with no defined major catchment, in the East Gippsland region of the Australian state of Victoria.

== Course and features ==
The Betka River rises south of Genoa in the Croajingolong National Park, just east of the Princes Highway, and flows generally northeast, then southeast, then east by north, before reaching its mouth with Bass Strait north of the Mallacoota Aerodrome in the Shire of East Gippsland. The river descends 130 metres (430 ft) over its 32 kilometres (20 mi) course.

The scarce Callistemon kenmorrisonii or Betka Bottlebrush, which is found in one place along the river, draws its name from the river.

== See also ==
- List of rivers of Australia
