= Imlay Creek =

Location
- Country: Australia
- States: New South Wales
- Region: South East Corner (IBRA), South Coast
- Local government areas: Bega Valley

Physical characteristics
- Source: Mount Imlay
  - location: within Mount Imlay NP
  - coordinates: 37°12′S 149°41′E
  - elevation: 307 m (1,007 ft)
- Mouth: confluence with the Wallagaraugh River
  - location: northwest of Timbillica
  - elevation: 141 m (463 ft)
- Length: 20 km (12 mi)

Basin features
- River system: Genoa River catchment
- National park: Mount Imlay NP

The Imlay Creek is a perennial river of the Genoa River catchment, with its headwaters and lower reaches located in the South Coast region of New South Wales, Australia.

== Course and features ==
The Imlay Creek rises below Mount Imlay within Mount Imlay National Park, and flows generally north, and then south, before reaching its confluence with the Wallagaraugh River northwest of Timbillica. The river descends 166 metres (545 ft) over its 20 kilometres (12 mi) course.

== See also ==
- Mount Imlay National Park
- List of rivers of New South Wales (A-K)
- List of rivers of Australia
- Rivers of New South Wales
