= Yambulla =

Locality and ghost town, in New South Wales, Australia

Coordinates: 37°12′51.5″S 149°33′12.2″E

Yambulla is a locality in the Bega Valley Shire local government area, within the South Coast region of New South Wales, Australia. There was once a mining village of the same name, now a ghost town. The locality and cadestral parish of Yambulla in the County of Auckland include the site of the old village. The locality is largely forested and is uninhabited. The nearest inhabited place is Towamba. The southern boundary of the locality is part of the New South Wales-Victoria border.

The area now known as Yambulla lies on the traditional land of Bidwell people. It lies in the catchment of Wallagaraugh River, a tributary of Genoa River. Another tributary of Genoa River, Yambulla Creek, despite its name, lies to the west, in the adjacent locality of Nungatta. The name 'Yambulla' also refers to a property in the valley of Yambulla Creek, at Nungatta South, which is notable for its "range of not-for-profit enterprises that will support First Nations Culture, conservation, research, education and knowledge-sharing". The New South Wales cadestral parish of Yambulla, in the County of Auckland, should not be confused with the identically named Victorian cadestral parish of Yambulla, in the County of Dargo.

== History ==
=== Mining and growth of the village ===
The area was part of the Towamba Goldfield, proclaimed in 1881. It was reported that gold had been found, some years earlier, around what would later be Yambulla, by Rev. W. B. Clarke, a noted geologist. In 1898, reef gold was discovered. In 1900, mining began near to where the mining village would begin to develop in the same year. Locals named the new settlement Ladysmith, in honour of the Siege of Ladysmith in the Second Boer War, and named the main street Haugh Street, after a local mine proprietor, James Haugh. There is also a then newly-named settlement, Ladysmith, near Wagga Wagga, and the village's official name became Yambulla. It was sometimes spelled as 'Yambula'.

By the end of 1900, the village had a population, reported to vary between 150 and 200 people, and already had three stores, a post office, butcher's and baker's' shop, a news and mining agency, and a bootmaker's shop. Later there was a school, a hotel called the Federal Hotel, and an establishment offering billiards and bagatelle. Land was set aside for a police station, but there never would be any police stationed there.

In early 1901, the village had yet to be surveyed by the government and there was an informal "rival township", named Spion Kop, for a nearby hill that was, in turn, named after the site of the Battle of Spion Kop. It was about a mile from the Yambulla village—to the north west—and closer to many of the mines. The rival settlement apparently did not last. Around the same time, the population of the area reached around 300.

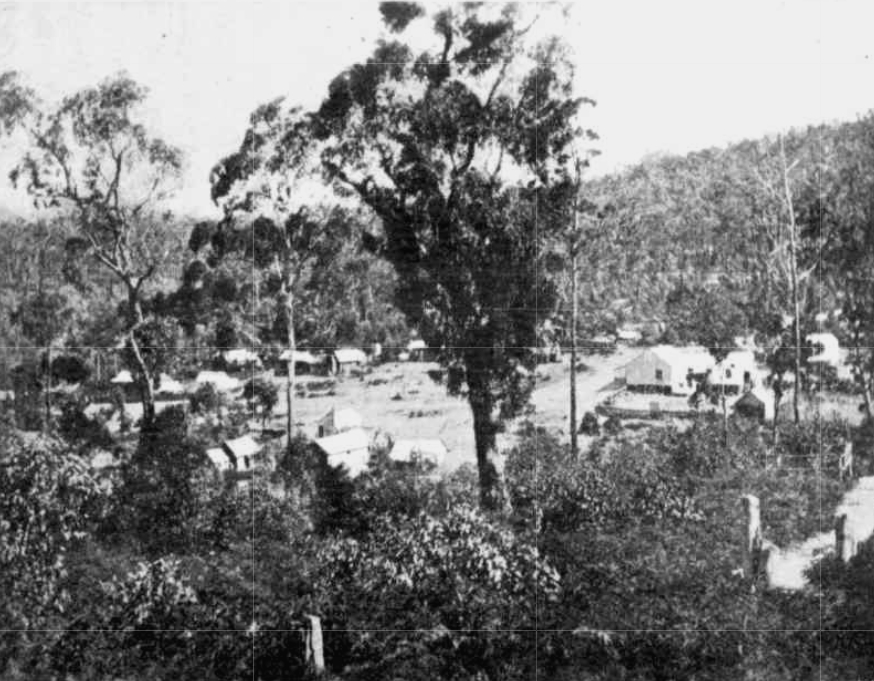
Mining village, looking toward Federal Hotel, c. 1909.

The mining village of Yambulla was described in February 1909 as being, "romantically situated in a valley, surrounded on all sides by hills of considerable height, Mount Poole being the highest. Their sides are thickly wooded. The township is small, and the houses are dotted about in the most picturesque fashion". It lay between Heathy Gap Creek and Wallagaraugh River (in earlier times, alternatively known as Timbillica River) upstream of their confluence, possibly sited with reliable access to water in mind. The village had domestic wells, but in dry times could become dependent upon the river for water. It also lay between the quartz reef mines in the surrounding hills and the alluvial workings that extended from around the village to three miles downstream of the confluence of the creek and the river.

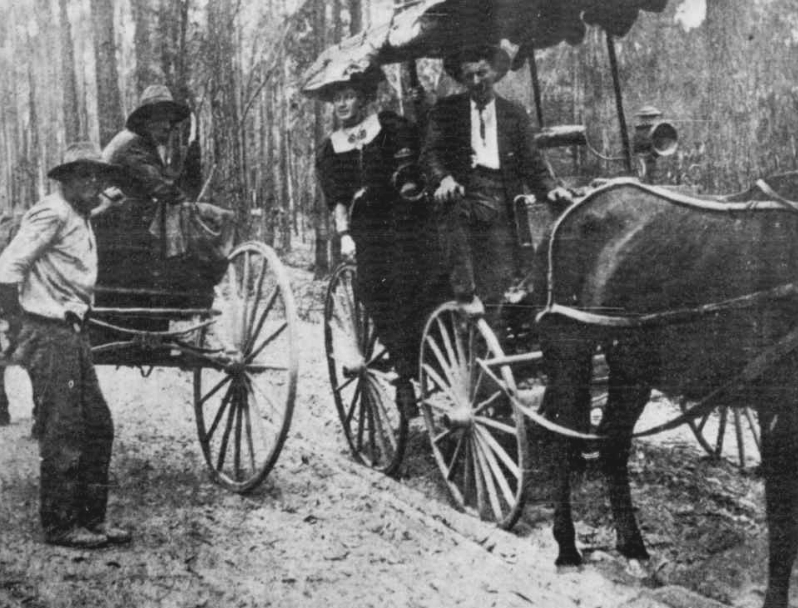
Mail Coach on the road to Yambulla, 1909. The caption at the original source reads, "The Yambulla Mail Coach. Being informed, we can go on another six miles, and then take our chance."

The Federal Hotel was the most substantial building in Yambulla. It had either 13 or 15 rooms and a veranda, a frontage clad in weatherboard, with the other external walls and the roof clad in corrugated iron, and was lined with pine. It had stables for four horses and an acetylene gas plant for interior gas lighting.

The southernmost settlement in New South Wales, Yambulla was an extremity of the New South Wales telegraph network. Around 1905, a telephone line was constructed from Towamba, using trees, where available, to support the wire. In 1906, the local federal parliamentary representative and Postmaster-General, Austin Chapman, visited Yambulla and spoke to a large gathering, at the village's School of Arts, consisting of people from the village and surrounding districts. Residents of Wangrabelle lobbied him to extend the telephone line from Yambulla to their village.

The village was connected to Towamba by an unsealed road, which continued beyond Yambulla, to the mining settlement of Wangrabelle, just over the border in Victoria. The route was part of what was known as the 'Old Coast Road', from Candelo to Orbost. During bushfires or floods, there was a risk of being isolated.

Isolation led, at times, to shortages of food and other supplies. The shortages led to locals harvesting wildlife, such as wallaby and 'badger' (wombat), for meat, and substituting the leaves of a plant that they called 'wild musk' (Olearia argophylla) for tobacco. Miners used wombat skins for leather and to make buckets in which to lift the ore from mine shafts.

Despite its remoteness, reportedly, no deaths occurred at Yambulla, before March 1908, when a five year old girl died. A miner died after being extricated from a ground fall, in March 1909, followed, in September 1909, by the accidental death of the postmaster's three year old daughter from burns. In 1911, prominent citizen, storekeeper and mine owner, Joseph Meradian, an Armenian migrant, died as a result of a stroke, at the age of just 41 years.

The main mine was the Yambulla Gold Mine, which operated from 1900 to 1912 and produced 234 kg of gold. It was the largest and the most sophisticated of the mines in the area. In 1909, its main shaft was 245 feet deep. By 1911, it was lit by electricity, had a 60 foot high poppet head, a ten-head stamper battery, and both amalgam / 'copper plate' and cyanide processes in use for gold recovery.

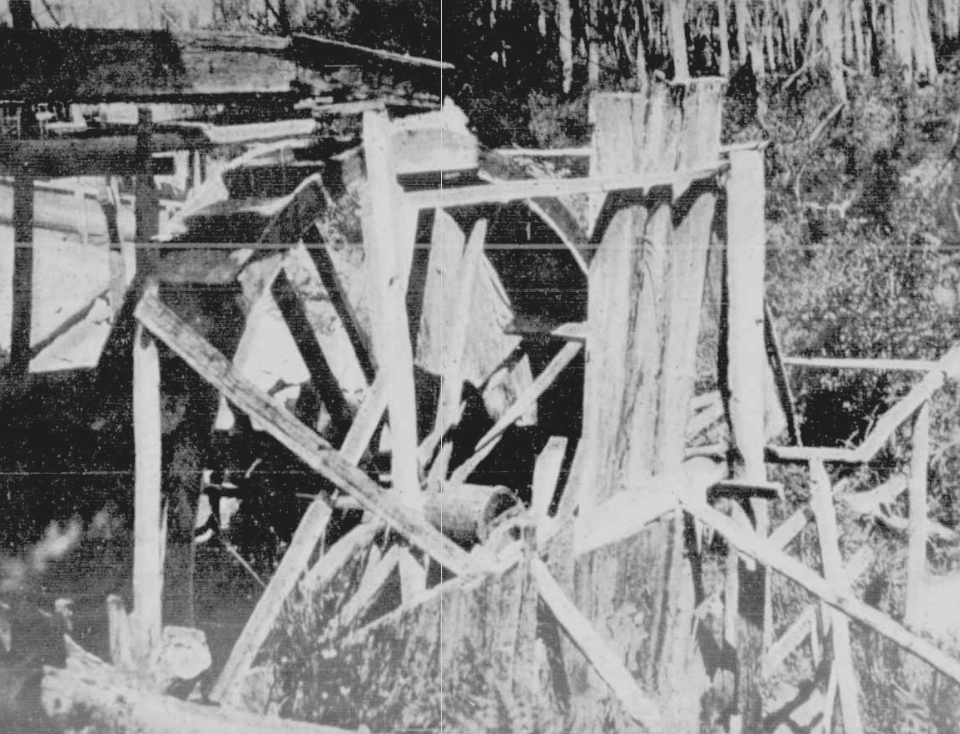
Jansen's water wheel (1909). Built c. 1901, it was still in use in 1909.

There were numerous smaller gold mines in the area around the village, which became known as the Yambulla Gold Field. Other notable goldmines were Meradian and Pola's mine and the Duchess of York mine. There were alluvial gold workings, using hydraulic sluicing, in the area.

There were several crushing batteries in the area. Some batteries were steam powered, but one was powered by a water wheel, using water from the Wallagaraugh River. The water-driven battery had three stamper heads and was made and operated, by a man named Jansen. Some mines produced a sulphide ore that, in the absence of a reverberatory furnace, for ore roasting, at Yambulla, needed to be sent to the Cockle Creek Smelter or Dapto Smelting Works to be processed in a smelter.

John George Gough (1848 – 1907), one of the founders of the Labour Electoral League, the first labour political grouping in Australia and a direct predecessor of the Australian Labor Party, was involved in Gough's Battery and other gold mining ventures at Yambulla.

Miners went on strike, demanding a minimum of 8s. 6d. per shift, and formed a branch of the Amalgamated Miners' Association, in April 1909, initially with 40 members. The new branch was affiliated to the branch at far distant Wrightville, another gold mining settlement, near Cobar. By June 1909, the miners had won higher wages, in all mines on the field, and the union had 60 members there. A representative of the Yambulla branch attended a conference with representatives of other branches in the Cobar district, at Cobar, in October 1909.

In 1909, one newspaper article carried a prediction that Yambulla would soon grow, "very probably to the extent that the town will shortly become a busy mining centre, and compare favourably with the speedy growth of the township of Canbelego when Mount Boppy broke out." However, Yambulla, was to be a short-lived gold field, the village did not grow further, and it would soon decline.

=== Decline and end of the village ===
Closure of the field's largest mine, the Yambulla Gold Mine, in late 1912, followed by the sale of its plant in late 1913, significantly lowered gold production at Yambulla. As mining waned, the village declined. By 1914, the population was down to 80 people and the village still had its school, post office, and hotel, but its last store had been pulled down and taken to Towamba. The village had lost its branch of the Amalgamated Miners' Association, which at one time reportedly had 80 union members. Some mining was still taking place in early 1916, but activity had virtually ceased by 1918. The post office closed in 1918.

The school had a precarious existence, first opening in 1901, it first closed in 1905. It seems to have reopened in 1906. A new school building was constructed in 1910, but no teacher was allocated to it. The school reopened in 1912, closed again in 1916 and reopened yet again in 1917, before finally closing in 1918. The school building was approved to be pulled down and taken by bullock team to Maharatta (near Bombala), around 1920. The building eventually became a classroom at Bombala Public School.

After completion of the road between Eden and Genoa (Princes Highway), around 1918, Yambulla and Wangrabelle no longer lay on the best route between those other places. Without mining and not being on the route to a major settlement, the village faded away completely.

The Federal Hotel, including both building and contents, was for sale in February 1918, with its licence, but had yet to be sold in August 1920. A report in 1931, stated that the hotel building "survived for some years as a guest house for occasional travellers on the through road to Wangrabelle, it too became unprofitable and was sold and removed from the locality". The fireplace of the hotel survived into the early 1950s at least.

The reservation of land for the cemetery was revoked in 1962. The dedication of the school grounds was revoked only in 1973. In 1985, allotments of land, totalling 5,539 sq.m, in the old village site, were resumed for forestry purposes.

The name of the locality officially became Yambulla, since at latest 1975, and that was confirmed in 1996.

Relics from the old village were lost when the school at Genoa was destroyed by fire, during the catastrophic 2019-2020 bushfire season.

== Publications ==
The Yambulla goldfield is the subject of a short book, by Jack Loney, titled 'Yambulla Gold: A Brief Record of the Colourful Yambulla Goldrush, Near Eden', published in 1987.

== Present day ==
Part of the locality is accessible via a sealed road, Imlay Road, that runs between the Princes Highway, at Narrabarba (south of Eden), and the Monaro Highway, at Rockton (south of Bombala). Branching off that road is an unsealed road, modern-day Yambula Road, that runs past the site of the old village. A piece of roadway in the village of Towamba is still also referred to as Yambulla Road, although there is no longer a straightforward route from there to the former site of the village at Yambulla.

There is little to show of the village today, except for some partially-cleared land, on modern-day Yambulla Road. A bend in the road follows an approximation of the general orientation of the main streets of the village. The ruin of the baker's oven remains. East of the village's former site, on the left bank of Wallagaraugh River, is the former site of the–probably empty–cemetery. There are mine shafts in the surrounding area, including that of the Duchess of York mine, and some other remnants of mining, including a ten-head stamper battery. Many of the former mines now lie within the Mount Poole Flora Reserve.

Much of the locality is Yambulla State Forest, and the main industry of the area is clear-fell timber harvesting.

One remnant of the old gold-mining village–Yambulla's former general store–still exists, at Towamba. It was relocated there, in 1914. It served again as a general store, into the 1940s, and is now used as a residence.
