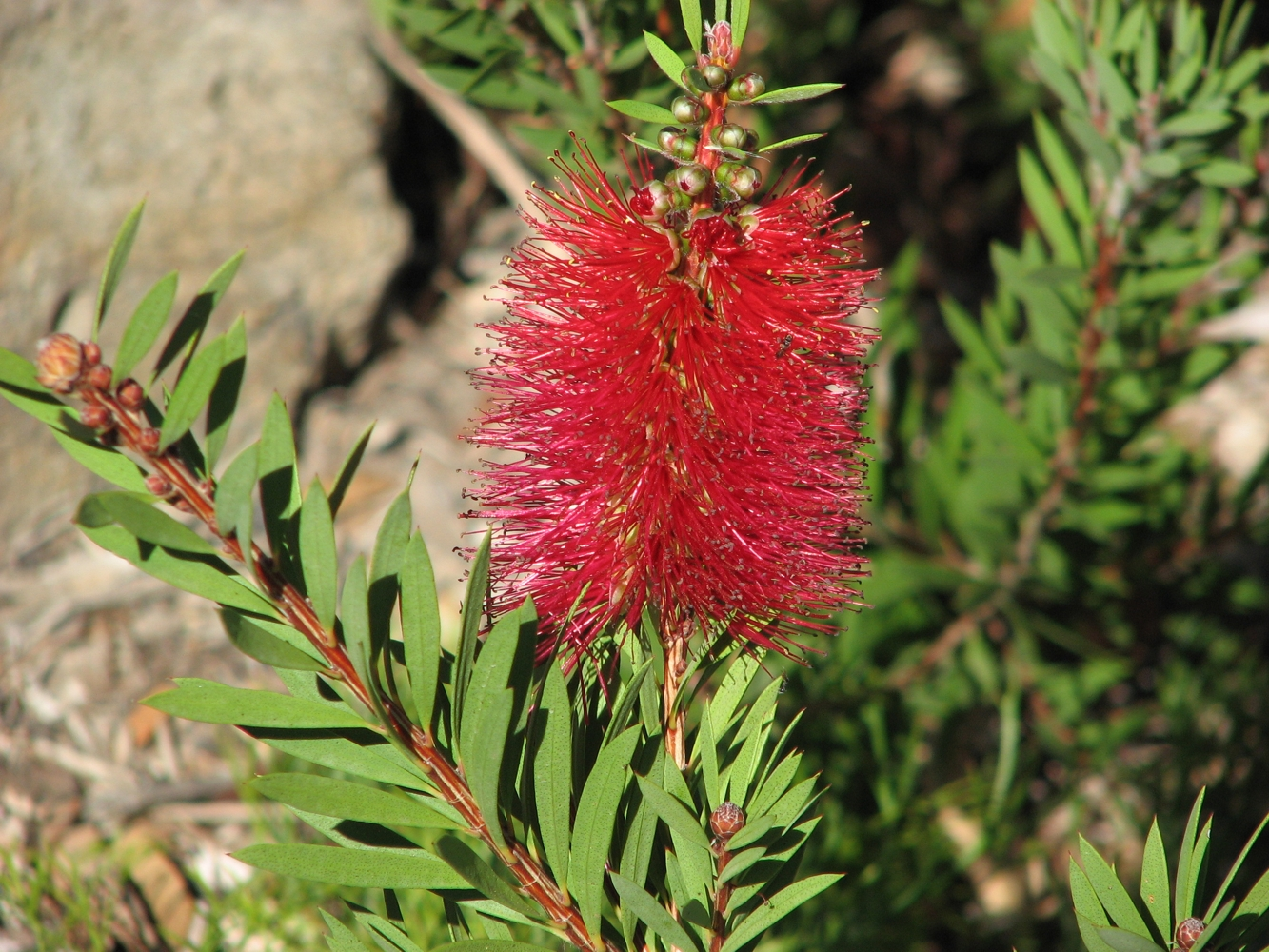

Conservation status
- Vulnerable (EPBC Act)

Scientific classification
- Kingdom: Plantae
- Clade: Embryophytes
- Clade: Tracheophytes
- Clade: Angiosperms
- Clade: Eudicots
- Clade: Rosids
- Order: Myrtales
- Family: Myrtaceae
- Genus: Callistemon
- Species: C. kenmorrisonii

Binomial name
- Callistemon kenmorrisonii Molyneux

= Callistemon kenmorrisonii =

Betka bottlebrush

Species of flowering plant

Callistemon kenmorrisonii, the Betka bottlebrush, is a shrub in the family Myrtaceae. It is endemic to the state of Victoria in Australia.

== Description ==
Betka bottlebrush is an upright or angular spreading shrub which grows to between 1 and 3 metres in height and 1 to 4 metres in width. It has grey bark which reveals white underneath after peeling. Its new growth is initially pink, becoming blue-green and eventually green with a non-glossy sheen. The stiff leaves are irregularly aligned as a result of twisted petioles. The crimson inflorescences appear predominantly between November and February in the species' native range. These are followed by squat, woody fruits which become partially embedded into the stem.

== Distribution ==
This species occurs in riparian scrub in an area of State forest on the upper Betka River near Genoa in East Gippsland. There are two colonies with a total population of 90 to 130 plants.

== Taxonomy ==
The species was first formally described in Muelleria in 1995 by Bill Molyneux. The species is named in honour of Kenneth Eugene Morrison, a former ranger of the Croajingolong National Park.
