= Wallagaraugh River =

River in Victoria, Australia

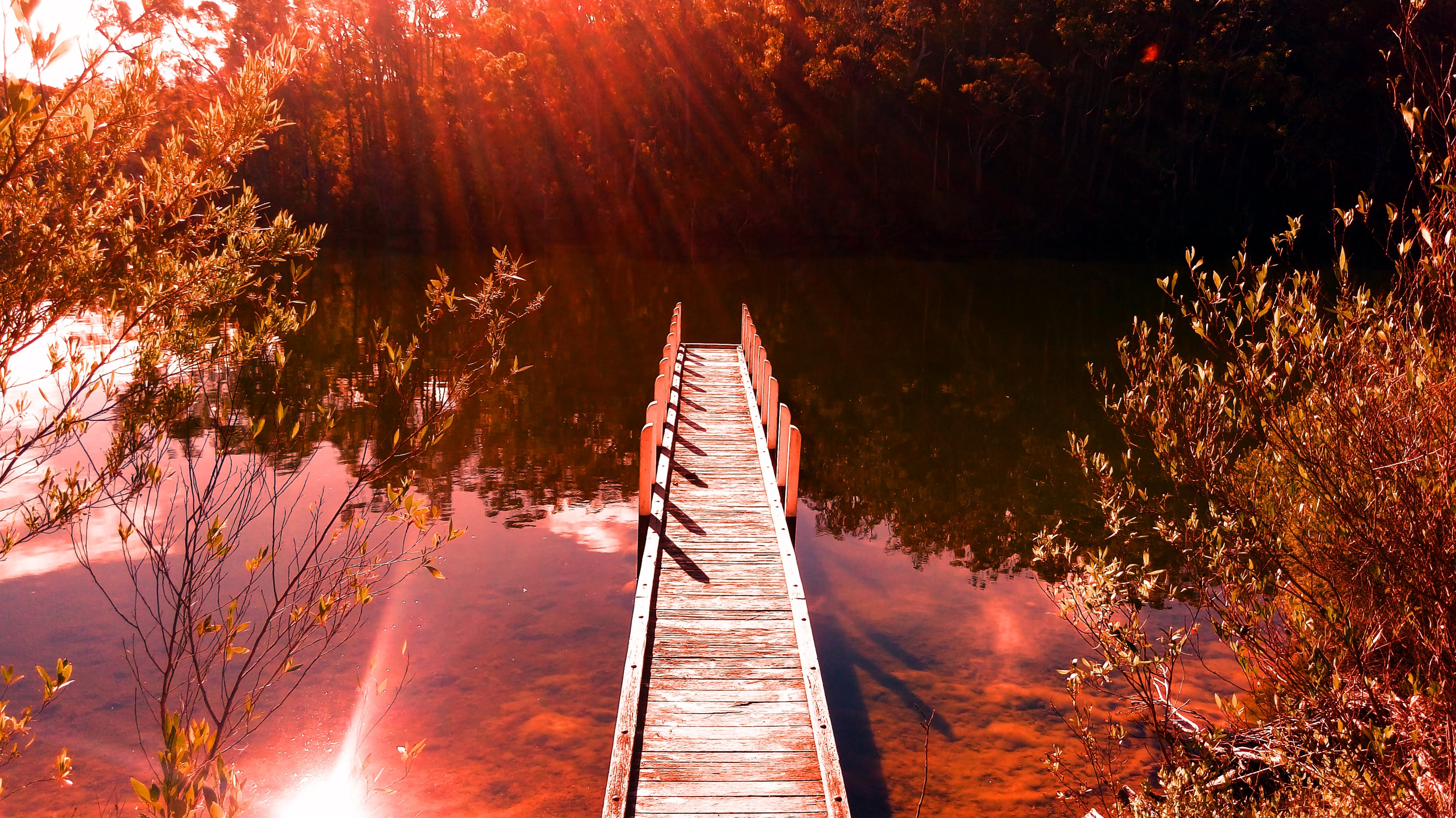

- Mouth of the Wallagaraugh River, in Victoria

Location
- Country: Australia
- States: New South Wales, Victoria
- Region: South East Corner (IBRA), South Coast
- District: East Gippsland
- Local government areas: Bega Valley, East Gippsland

Physical characteristics
- Source: Mount Poole, Yambulla
  - location: South Coast, New South Wales
  - coordinates: 37°12′S 149°30′E
  - elevation: 424 m (1,391 ft)
- Mouth: confluence with the Genoa River
  - location: east of Genoa, East Gippsland, Victoria
  - coordinates: 37°25′41″S 149°42′50″E
  - elevation: 77 m (253 ft)
- Length: 34 km (21 mi)

Basin features
- River system: Genoa River catchment
- Tributaries
  - right: Wog Wog Creek, Letts Creek
- Nature reserve: Nadgee

The Wallagaraugh River is a perennial river of the Genoa River catchment, with its headwaters located in the South Coast region of New South Wales and its lower reaches located in the East Gippsland region of Victoria, Australia. In earlier times, an alternative name for the river was Timbillica River.

== Course and features ==
The Wallagaraugh River rises below Mount Poole, approximately 10 kilometres (6.2 mi) northeast of Nungatta, in New South Wales, within the locality of Yambulla. The river flows generally south, then east, and then south, crossing the Black-Allan Line that forms part of the border between Victoria and New South Wales, joined by eight minor tributaries and flowing through Nadgee Nature Reserve, before reaching its confluence with the Genoa River at Coleman Inlet, east of Genoa in Victoria. The river descends 423 metres (1,388 ft) over its 66 kilometres (41 mi) course.

North of the Black-Allan Line and within Nadgee State Forest, the Princes Highway crosses the river.

== See also ==
- Croajingolong National Park
- List of rivers of New South Wales (L–Z)
- List of rivers of Australia
- Rivers of New South Wales
- Yambulla
- Timbillica
