= Wingan River =

River in Victoria, Australia

Wingan
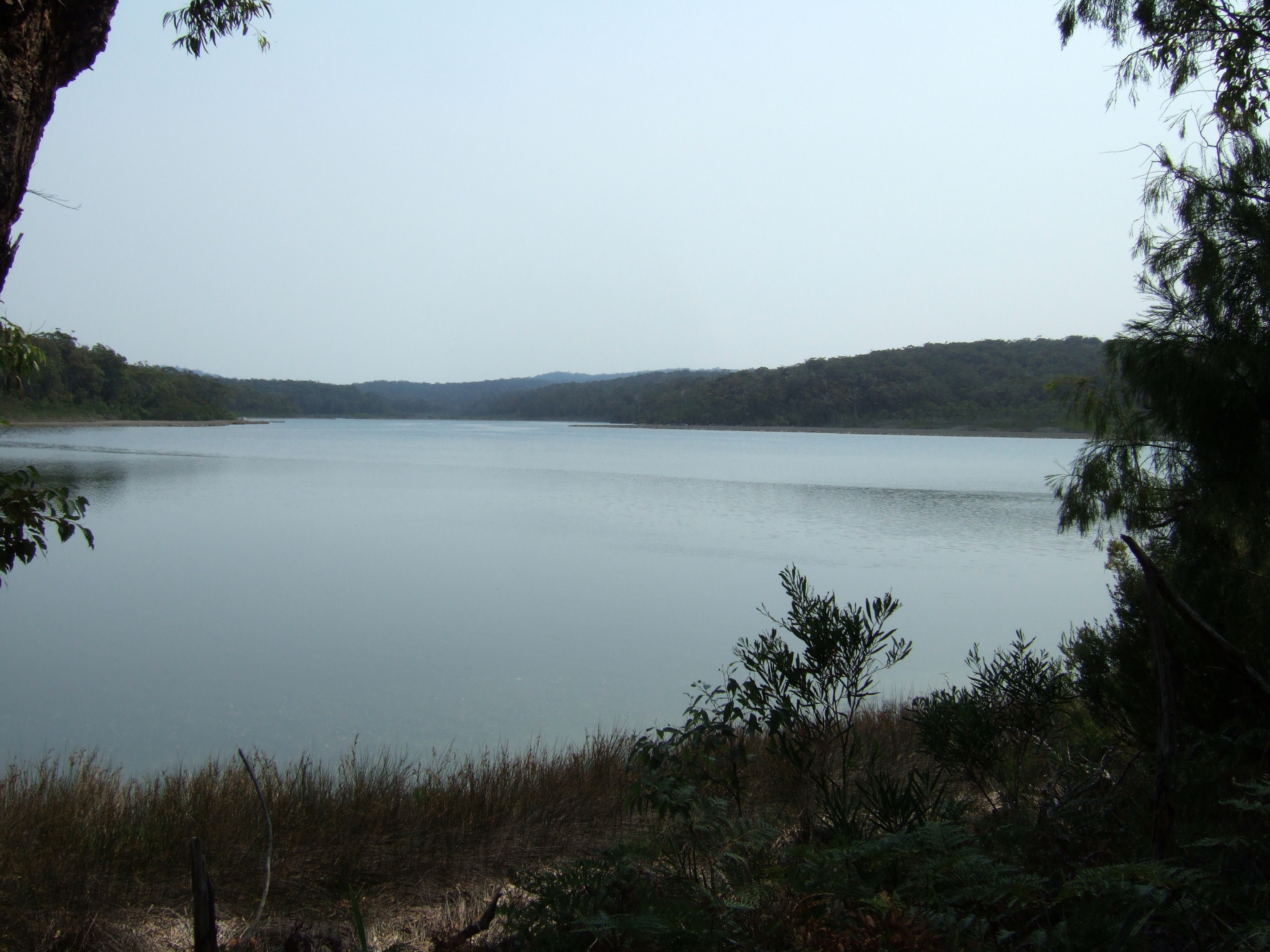
- The Wingan Inlet, at the mouth of the Wingan River.

- Mouth of the Wingan River, in Victoria
- Etymology: Aboriginal: wangan, meaning "reed bed"

Location
- Country: Australia
- State: Victoria
- Region: South East Corner (IBRA), East Gippsland
- Local government area: Shire of East Gippsland

Physical characteristics
- Source: Mount Future
  - location: Wingan Swamp
  - elevation: 188 m (617 ft)
- Mouth: Bass Strait
  - location: Wingan Inlet
  - coordinates: 37°44′21″S 149°30′14″E
  - elevation: 0 m (0 ft)
- Length: 49 km (30 mi)

Basin features
- Tributaries
  - left: Yoke Up Creek, Hard To Seek Creek
  - right: Scrubby Creek, Karlo Creek, Dingo Creek (Victoria), Scudder Creek, Surprise Creek, Branch Creek (Victoria)
- National parks: Alfred NP, Croajingolong NP, Wingan Inlet NP

The Wingan River is a perennial river with no defined major catchment, in the East Gippsland region of the Australian state of Victoria.

== Course and features ==
The Wingan River rises below Mount Future, near the Wingan Swamp, north of the Alfred National Park between Cann River and Genoa, and flows generally south through the Croajingolong National Park joined by eight minor tributaries before reaching its mouth with Bass Strait, at the Wingan Inlet within the Wingan Inlet National Park in the Shire of East Gippsland. The river descends 188 metres (617 ft) over its 49 kilometres (30 mi) course.

The upper reaches of the river is traversed by the Princes Highway.

== Etymology ==
The name of the river is derived from the Aboriginal word wangan, meaning "reed bed".

== See also ==
- List of rivers of Australia
