= Kate Mildenhall =

Australian author

- Born: Melbourne, Australia
- Occupations: Writer, teacher, podcaster
- Notable work: Skylarking (2016)
- Website: katemildenhall.com

Kate Mildenhall is an Australian author and teacher, best known for her 2016 debut novel Skylarking. Her fourth novel, The Hiding Place, was published in October 2025.

== Early life and education ==
Kate Mildenhall was born in Melbourne, Australia, and lived in what is described as the "green fringe" of Melbourne. She attended Eltham High School. Growing up Mildenhall wanted to be "an Oscar-winning film director".

Mildenhall spent a lot of time during her teenage years camping on an isolated cape at Point Hicks, and stayed in the Point Hicks Lighthouse.

== Career ==
=== Writing ===
Mildenhall's debut novel, Skylarking, was published in Australia by Black Inc. in 2016 and in the UK by Legend Press in 2017. The novel centres on two best friends who are growing up together on an isolated Australian cape in the 1880s. The Courier-Mail, referring to the true story on which Skylarking is based, wrote "it's testament to Kate Mildenhall’s skill that you become so immersed in the lives of best friends Kate and Harriet you feel the dread, but hope it will not be so. The Sydney Morning Herald review noted "Skylarking seems a rather jaunty title for a story about (unrequited) love and loss, but before we arrive at the unexpectedly tragic swerve in the narrative there's a lot of joy in Kate Mildenhall's debut".Annie Condon from Readings Monthly said of the book: "It is hard to believe that Skylarking is Kate Mildenhall's debut novel, as her ability to create both character and atmosphere is impressive". Author Clare Wright described Skylarking as "historical fiction at its evocative best, while author Hannah Kent wrote that it was one of her favourite books of 2016, and stated that she hoped Mildenhall would continue to write, as she had "an abundance of talent".

Her second novel, The Mother Fault, was published by Simon & Schuster in September 2020. Her third novel, The Humming Bird Effect, was published in August 2023.

Her fourth novel, The Hiding Place, was published in October 2025. Writing for The Guardian, Bec Kavanagh described the book as "an edge-of-your-seat thriller".

=== Teaching ===
Mildenhall is also a teacher, and has taught in a variety of settings, including schools in Victoria and Cambodia, RMIT University, and State Library Victoria.

=== Podcasting ===
As of 2018 Mildenhall co-hosted the First Time podcast with her friend, writer Katherine Collette.

== Recognition and awards ==
In 2017, Skylarking was longlisted for the Voss Literary Prize and the Indie Book Awards.

The Mother Fault was shortlisted for the 2020 Aurealis Award for best science fiction novel.

Mildenhall was shortlisted for the 2023 Blake-Beckett Trust Scholarship, awarded by the Australian Society of Authors.

The Humming Bird Effect was longlisted for the 2024 Stella Prize.
