= Leucopogon polystachyus =

Conservation status
- Priority Four — Rare Taxa (DEC)

Scientific classification
- Kingdom: Plantae
- Clade: Tracheophytes
- Clade: Angiosperms
- Clade: Eudicots
- Clade: Asterids
- Order: Ericales
- Family: Ericaceae
- Genus: Leucopogon
- Species: L. polystachyus

Binomial name
- Leucopogon polystachyus R.Br.
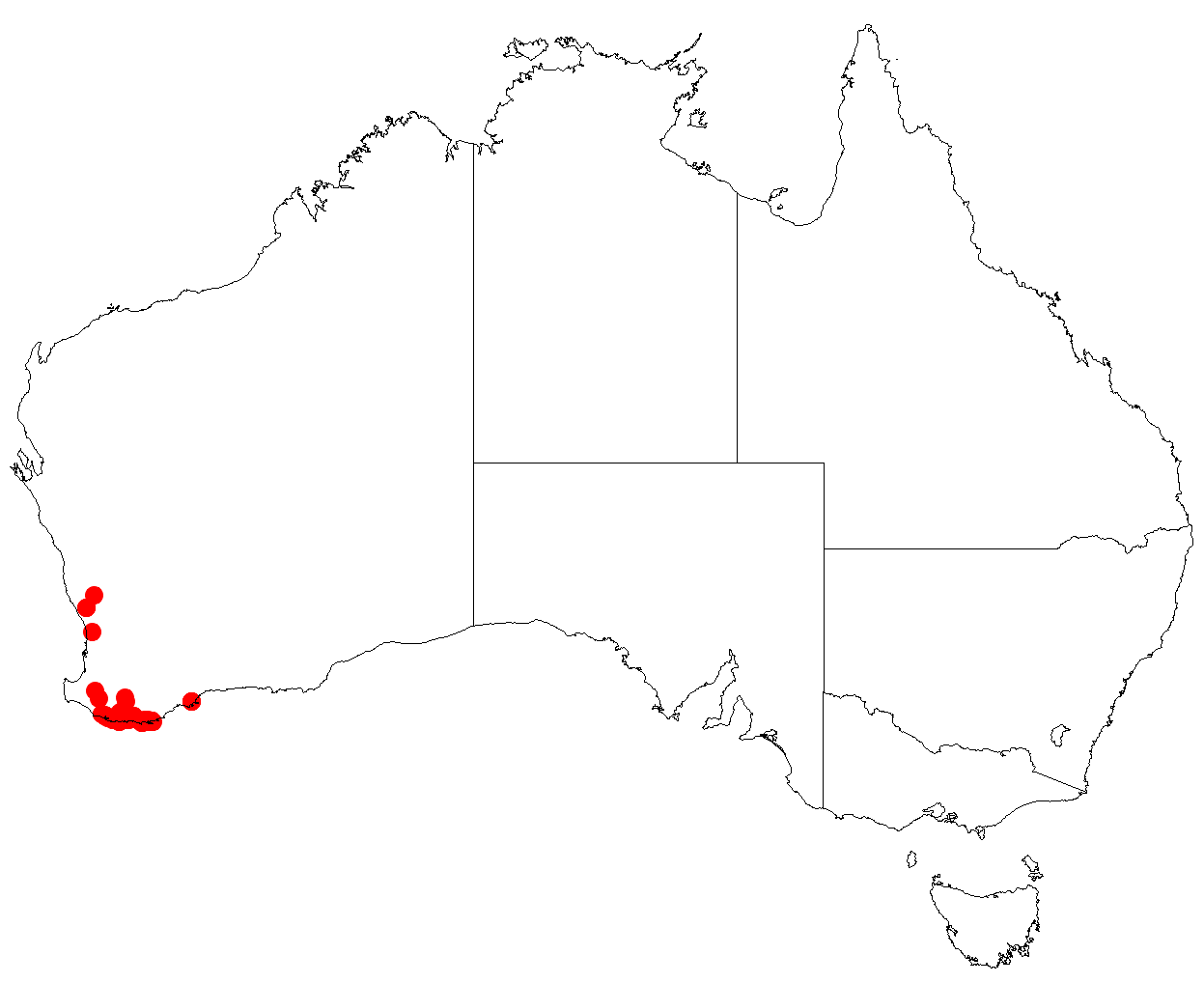
- Occurrence data from AVH

Synonyms
- Leucopogon polystachyus var. monostachys Sond.; Leucopogon polystachyus R.Br. var. polystachyus; Leucopogon polystachyus var. serratifolius Sond.; Styphelia polystachya F.Muell. orth. var.; Styphelia polystachyus (R.Br.) Spreng.

Species of plant

Leucopogon polystachyus is a species of flowering plant in the heath family Ericaceae and is endemic to the south-west of Western Australia. It is a slender, erect, usually glabrous shrub that typically grows to a height of 0.4–2 m (1 ft 4 in – 6 ft 7 in). Its leaves are linear to lance-shaped, 8.5–17 mm (0.33–0.67 in) long with a rigid, sharply-pointed tip on the end. The flowers are borne on the ends of branches or in leaf axils in short, dense spikes with small, egg-shaped bracts and bracteoles about half as long as the sepals. The sepals are about 3.2 mm (0.13 in) long and often pale pink, and the petals are white, about 4 mm (0.16 in) long and joined at the base, forming a tube, the petal lobes longer than the petal tube.

The species was first formally described in 1810 by Robert Brown in Prodromus Florae Novae Hollandiae et Insulae Van Diemen from specimens he collected near King George Sound between Princess Royal Harbour and Cape Howe. The specific epithet (polystachyus) means "many flower spikes".

Leucopogon polystachyus grows in seasonal swamps, on sand dunes and laterite ridges between Manjimup and King George Sound near Albany in the Jarrah Forest and Warren bioregions of south-western Western Australia. It is listed as "not threatened" by the Government of Western Australia Department of Biodiversity, Conservation and Attractions.
