= Point Hicks Lighthouse =

Point Hicks Lighthouse Cape Everard
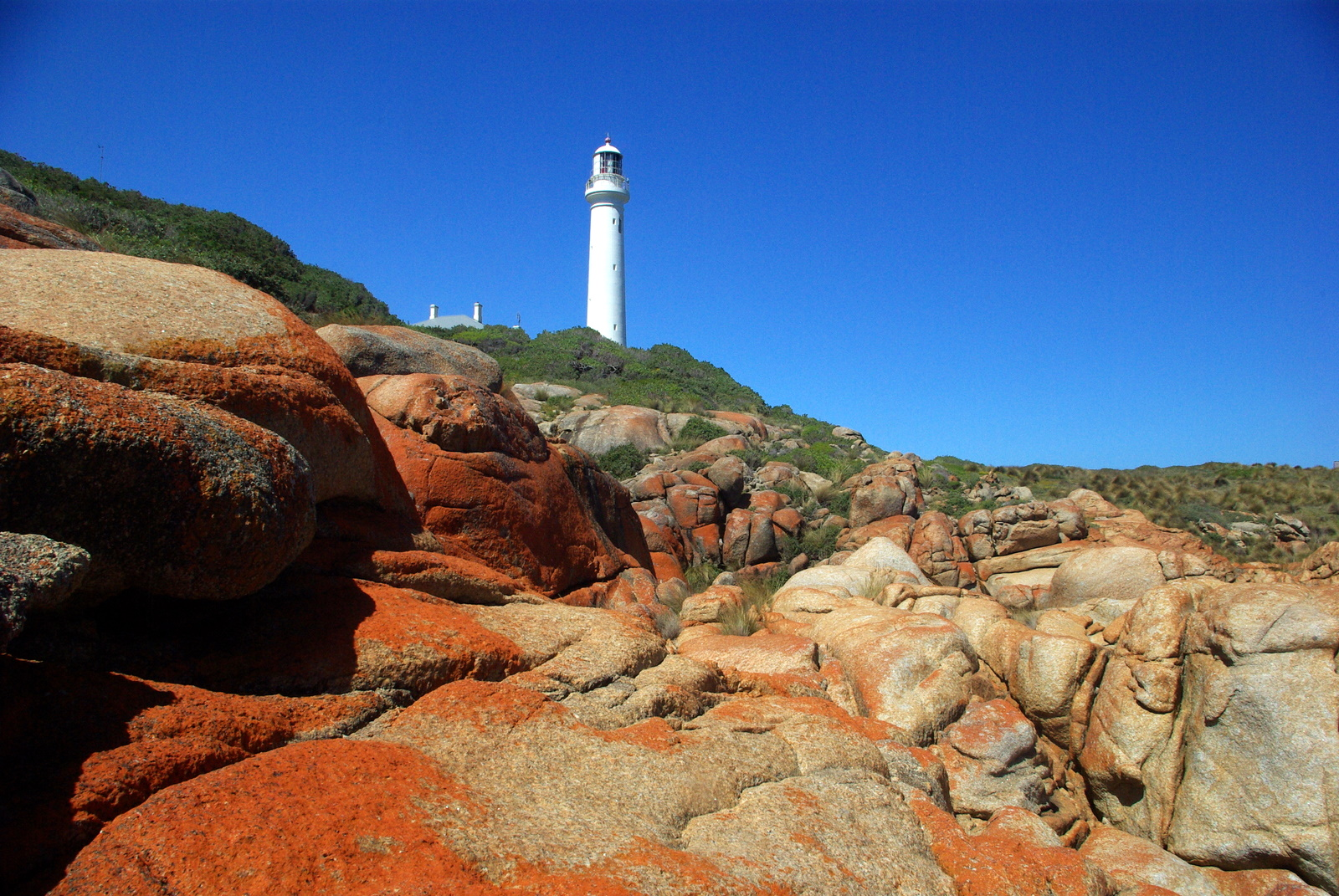
- Point Hicks Lighthouse
- Location: East Gippsland; Victoria; Australia
- Coordinates: 37°48′06.8″S 149°16′31.9″E

Tower
- Constructed: 1890
- Construction: concrete tower
- Height: 37 metres (121 ft)
- Shape: cylindrical tower with balcony and lantern
- Markings: white tower and lantern
- Power source: solar power
- Operator: Victorian Channels Authority
- Heritage: Victorian Heritage Register

Light
- Focal height: 56 metres (184 ft)
- Characteristic: Gp Fl (2) 10s.

Point Hicks Lighthouse is a lighthouse located on the Point Hicks headland, in the East Gippsland region of Victoria, Australia.

== Location ==
Located within the Croajingolong National Park and on the edge of the Point Hicks Marine National Park, approximately 500 kilometres (310 mi) east of Melbourne, the lighthouse serves as a warning beacon for vessels in the southern reaches of the Tasman Sea, and the northeastern reaches of the Bass Strait.

== History ==
The lighthouse was built on the point during 1887 and 1888 and commenced operation in 1890, built from concrete and with timber keepers quarters. It was connected to mains electricity in 1965, and then to solar power recently. The keepers' cottages are today let as holiday houses. At 37 metres (121 ft), it is the tallest lighthouse on Australia's mainland. Its light characteristic is a double white flash every ten seconds, emitted from a focal plane height of 56 metres (184 ft) above sea level.

On 4 February 1971, the lighthouse and the headkeepers' and assistant keepers' quarters were listed as a place of regional significance on the precursor to the Victorian Heritage Register.

== See also ==
- List of lighthouses in Australia
- Gabo Island Lighthouse
- Wilsons Promontory Lighthouse
