= Thurra River =

Thurra
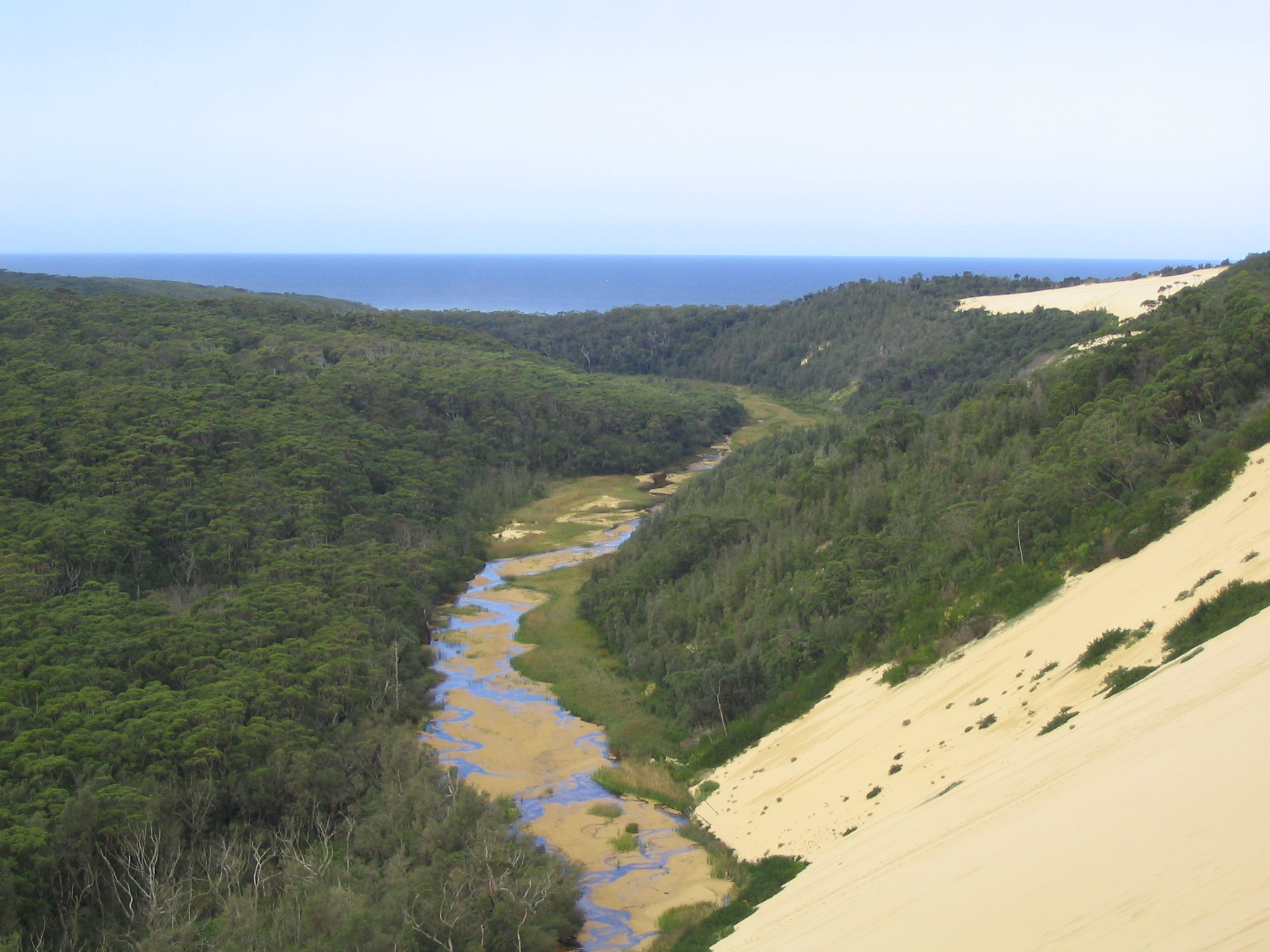
- Thurra River from the Croajingolong sand dunes

- Mouth of the Thurra River, in Victoria.

Location
- Country: Australia
- State: Victoria
- Region: South East Corner (IBRA), East Gippsland
- Local government area: Shire of East Gippsland

Physical characteristics
- Source: Mealing Hill
  - elevation: 311 m (1,020 ft)
- Mouth: Bass Strait
  - location: near Point Hicks
  - coordinates: 37°46′56″S 149°18′39″E
  - elevation: 0 m (0 ft)
- Length: 71 km (44 mi)

Basin features
- National parks: Alfred NP, Croajingolong NP

The Thurra River is a perennial river with no defined major catchment, in the East Gippsland region of the Australian state of Victoria.

== Course and features ==
The Thurra River rises below Mealing Hill in remote country northeast of the Cann River and flows generally south through the western edge of the Alfred National Park and through the Croajingolong National Park, before reaching its mouth with the Bass Strait, east northeast of Point Hicks in the Shire of East Gippsland. The river descends 311 metres (1,020 ft) over its 71 kilometres (44 mi) course.

The river is traversed by the Princes Highway east of Cann River.

There are Parks Victoria campsites near the Thurra River mouth.

== See also ==
- List of rivers of Australia
