= Point Hicks Marine National Park =

Protected area in Victoria, Australia

- IUCN category II (national park)
- Location within Victoria
- Location: Victoria
- Nearest city: Cann River
- Coordinates: 37°48′S 149°15′E
- Area: 40 km^{2} (15 sq mi)
- Established: 16 November 2002
- Governing body: Parks Victoria
- Website: Official website

The Point Hicks Marine National Park is a protected marine national park situated off Point Hicks in the East Gippsland region of Victoria, Australia. The 4,000-hectare (9,900-acre) marine park is situated approximately 450 kilometres (280 mi) east of Melbourne and 25 kilometres (16 mi) south of Cann River, adjacent to the Croajingolong National Park and Point Hicks Lighthouse Reserve.

The marine national park contains the site of two shipwrecks: the SS Kerangie lost in 1879, and the SS Saros lost in 1937.

Point Hicks represents Victoria's warmer eastern marine environment, and contains species that do not occur in the cooler waters to the west.

== See also ==
- Protected areas of Victoria
