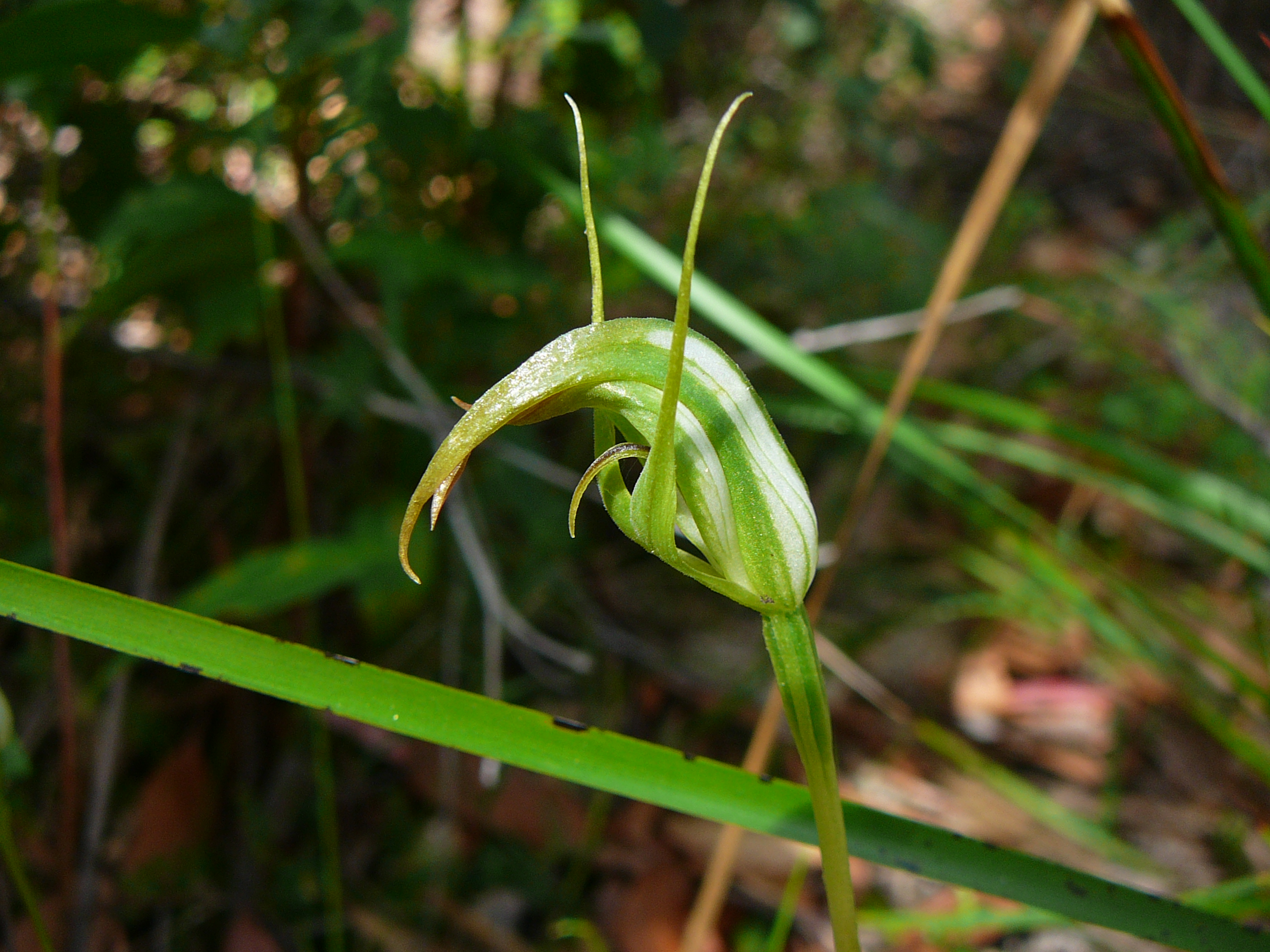
- Pterostylis acuminata growing near Mallacoota

Conservation status
- Least Concern (IUCN 3.1)

Scientific classification
- Kingdom: Plantae
- Clade: Tracheophytes
- Clade: Angiosperms
- Clade: Monocots
- Order: Asparagales
- Family: Orchidaceae
- Subfamily: Orchidoideae
- Tribe: Cranichideae
- Genus: Pterostylis
- Species: P. acuminata

Binomial name
- Pterostylis acuminata R.Br.

Synonyms
- Pterostylis acuminata R.Br. var. acuminata

= Pterostylis acuminata =

Sharp greenhood

Species of orchid

Pterostylis acuminata, commonly known as the sharp greenhood or pointed greenhood, is a species of orchid endemic to eastern Australia. It has a rosette of leaves and a single green and white flower, leaning forward with a brown point on the end of the labellum.

== Description ==
Pterostylis acuminata has a rosette of between three and six dark green, oblong leaves, each leaf 10–40 mm (0.4–2 in) long and 8–20 mm (0.3–0.8 in) wide. A single green and white flower is borne on a flowering spike 150–250 mm (6–10 in) high. The flowers are 19–25 mm (0.7–1 in) long, 9–12 mm (0.4–0.5 in) wide and lean forward or "nod". The dorsal sepal and petals are joined and curve forward forming a hood over the column. The tip of the hood is sharply pointed and brownish. There is a broad, bulging gap in the sinus between the lateral sepals and a large gap between the lateral sepals and petals. The lateral sepals have thread-like tips 20–25 mm (0.8–1 in) long. The labellum protrudes through the sinus and is 14–16 mm (0.55–0.63 in) long, about 4 mm (0.2 in) wide, curved, reddish-brown and pointed. Flowering occurs between March and May.

== Taxonomy and naming ==
Pterostylis acuminata was first described in 1810 by Robert Brown and the description was published in Prodromus Florae Novae Hollandiae et Insulae Van Diemen. The specific epithet (acuminata) is a Latin word meaning "sharpened" or "pointed".

== Distribution and habitat ==
The sharp greenhood grows in coastal forest and heath in Queensland and New South Wales. There is also an isolated population in far eastern Victoria.
