= Cape Howe Marine National Park =

Protected area in Victoria, Australia

- IUCN category II (national park)
- Location within Victoria
- Location: Victoria
- Nearest city: Mallacoota
- Coordinates: 37°32′S 149°57′E
- Area: 40.5 km^{2} (15.6 sq mi)
- Established: 16 November 2002
- Governing body: Parks Victoria
- Website: http://parkweb.vic.gov.au/explore/parks/cape-howe-marine-national-park

The Cape Howe Marine National Park is a protected marine national park situated off eastern Gippsland in the far eastern tip of Victoria, Australia. The 4,050-hectare (10,000-acre) marine park extends from just east of Gabo Island to Cape Howe and the New South Wales border, and is adjacent to Croajingolong National Park.

== See also ==
- Protected areas of Victoria
