= Mallacoota Airport =

- IATA: XMC; ICAO: YMCO

Summary
- Airport type: Public
- Operator: East Gippsland Shire Council
- Location: Mallacoota, Victoria
- Elevation AMSL: 102 ft / 31 m
- Coordinates: 37°35′56″S 149°43′15″E

Map
- Location in Victoria

Runways
| Direction | Length | | Surface |
| Direction | m | ft | Surface |
|---|---|---|---|
| 07/25 | 881 | 2,890 | Gravel |
| 18/36 | 1,028 | 3,373 | Asphalt |
- Sources: Australian AIP and aerodrome chart

Mallacoota Airport (IATA: XMC, ICAO: YMCO) is located at Mallacoota, Victoria, Australia and is operated by East Gippsland Shire Council.

== See also ==
- List of airports in Victoria, Australia
