= Rame Head (Victoria) =

Headland in Victoria, Australia

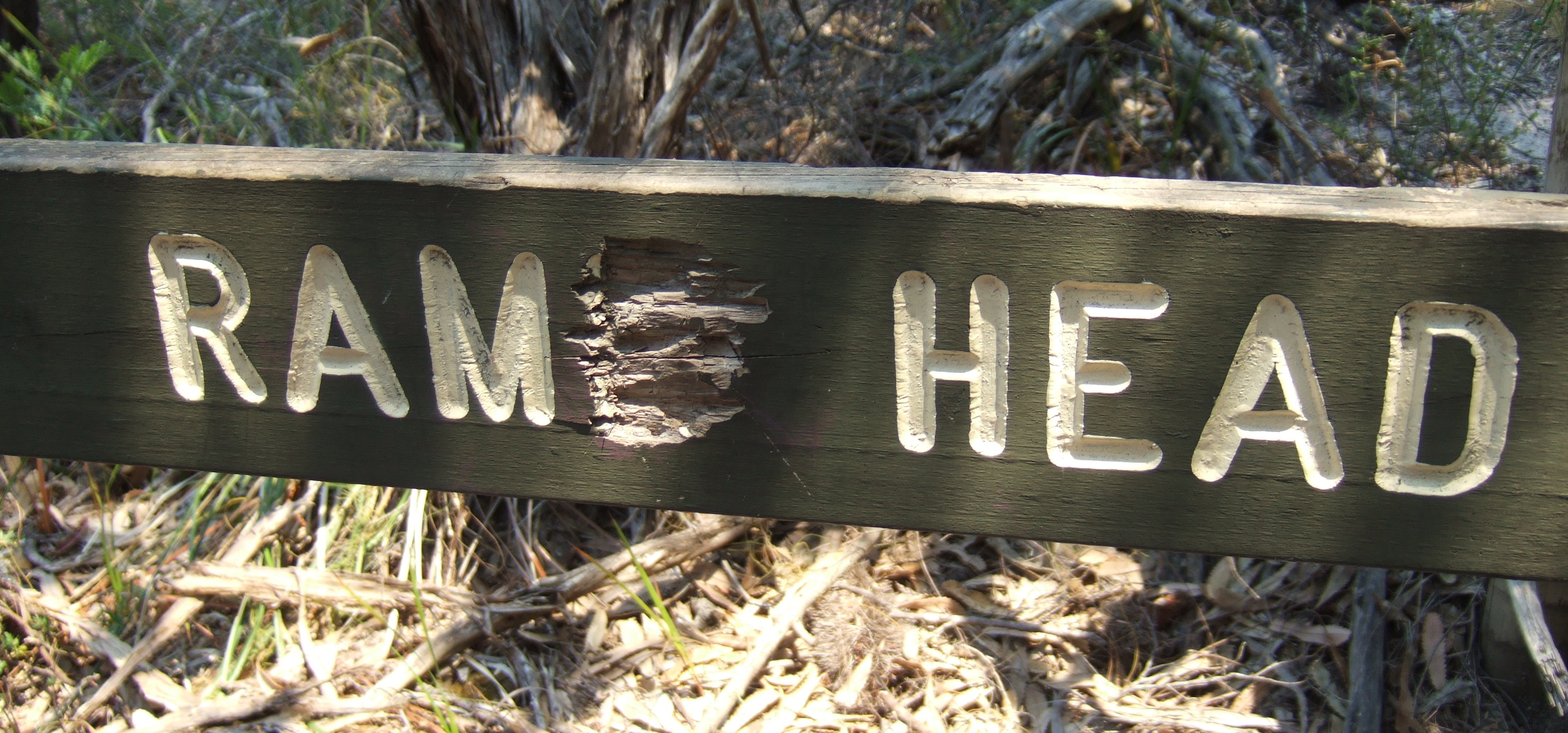
Vandalism to a track sign reflects ongoing controversy about the spelling of the name.

Ram Head or since 1970 Rame Head (37°46′S 149°29′E) is a coastal headland in eastern Victoria, Australia. It is within the Croajingolong National Park.

The local aboriginal people call the headland Konowee or Kouowee. James Cook (Captain Cook) named today's Rame Head as he passed by on 19 April 1770 [log date]. Cook named Rame Head Ram Head, after a point that can be seen going into Plymouth Sound, Cook wrote the name Ram in Modern English (as used today) and that spelling was adopted by Aaron Arrowsmith, George Bass, Matthew Flinders, James Grant, Louis de Freycinet and even John Hawesworth when commissioned by the Admiralty to edit Cook's papers and journal and that spelling became official when the Admiralty published Matthew Flinders' charts, dated January and February 1814. The Royal Navy and later the Australian Navy continued to use Cook's spelling of "Ram" for the headland in Australia. In the early 1800s, while Ram Head was still being used in Australia, the British reverted to the Early Modern English spelling of "Rame" for the point in Cornwall UK. In 1971, the Victorian Government gazetted the point as "Rame" to match its Cornish namesake.

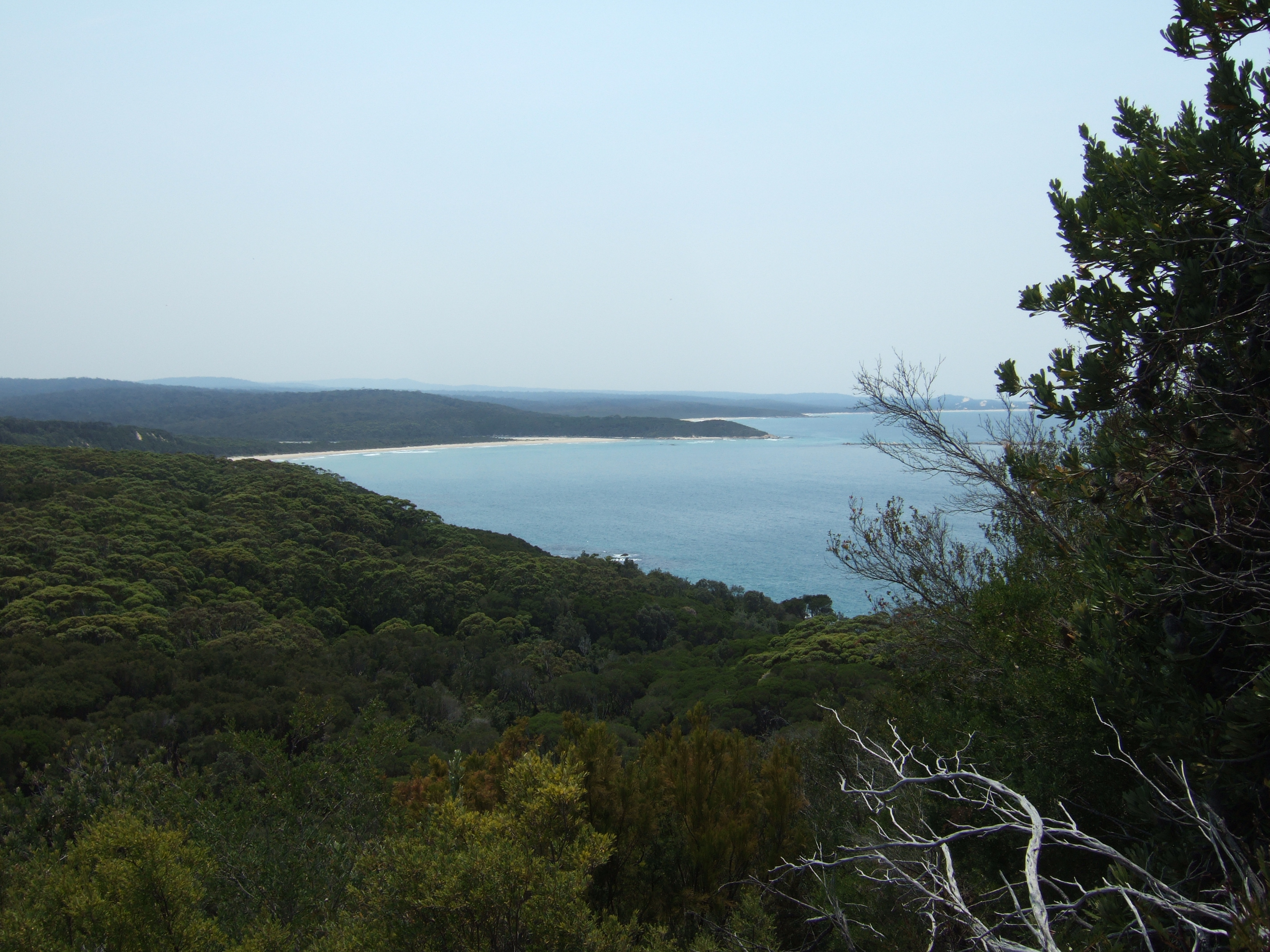
A view from partway up Rame Head, looking north along the beach towards Wingan Inlet

In Cook's time, Naval Charts used Cook's spelling for the Headland in Cornwall, and the small village nearby mainly used the New modem English spelling, we use today. Around 1810 the small village and Headland, in Cornwall, reverted to the Old Modern English spelling of Rame. There are many grave stones in the area, dating back to the early and mid-1700s that also used "Ram".

In 1986 one of Australia's foremost maritime historians, Lieutenant Commander Geoffrey Ingleton RAN – "An accomplished and fine Cartographer" – wrote in his book Matthew Flinders: Navigator and Chartmaker [page 42]: "The coastlines of both New South Wales (the present Victoria) and Van Diemens Land (the present Tasmania) were carefully delineated by Flinders, considering the nature and quickness of the survey. Particularly interesting was Flinders' correct identification of Cook's Ram Head, so named for its similarity to Rame Head in England in the western approaches to Plymouth. Flinders was familiar with its characteristic appearance – a conical hill on a distinctive promontory. The only feature on this coast SW of Cape Howe which meets exactly that description is the present Rame Head. This historic headland is identical with that shown on Flinders' charts; further, the name was correctly spelt by Flinders."

There is a walking track to the "summit" of the head. However, this point lacks a clear vantage point over surrounding scrub, and is simply marked by a trig point.

== See also ==
- James Cook

== Sources ==
- Placenames Australia, journal of the Australian National Placenames Survey, June 2002
- Rame Head at Geoscience Australia
