= Wingan Inlet =

Inlet in Victoria, Australia

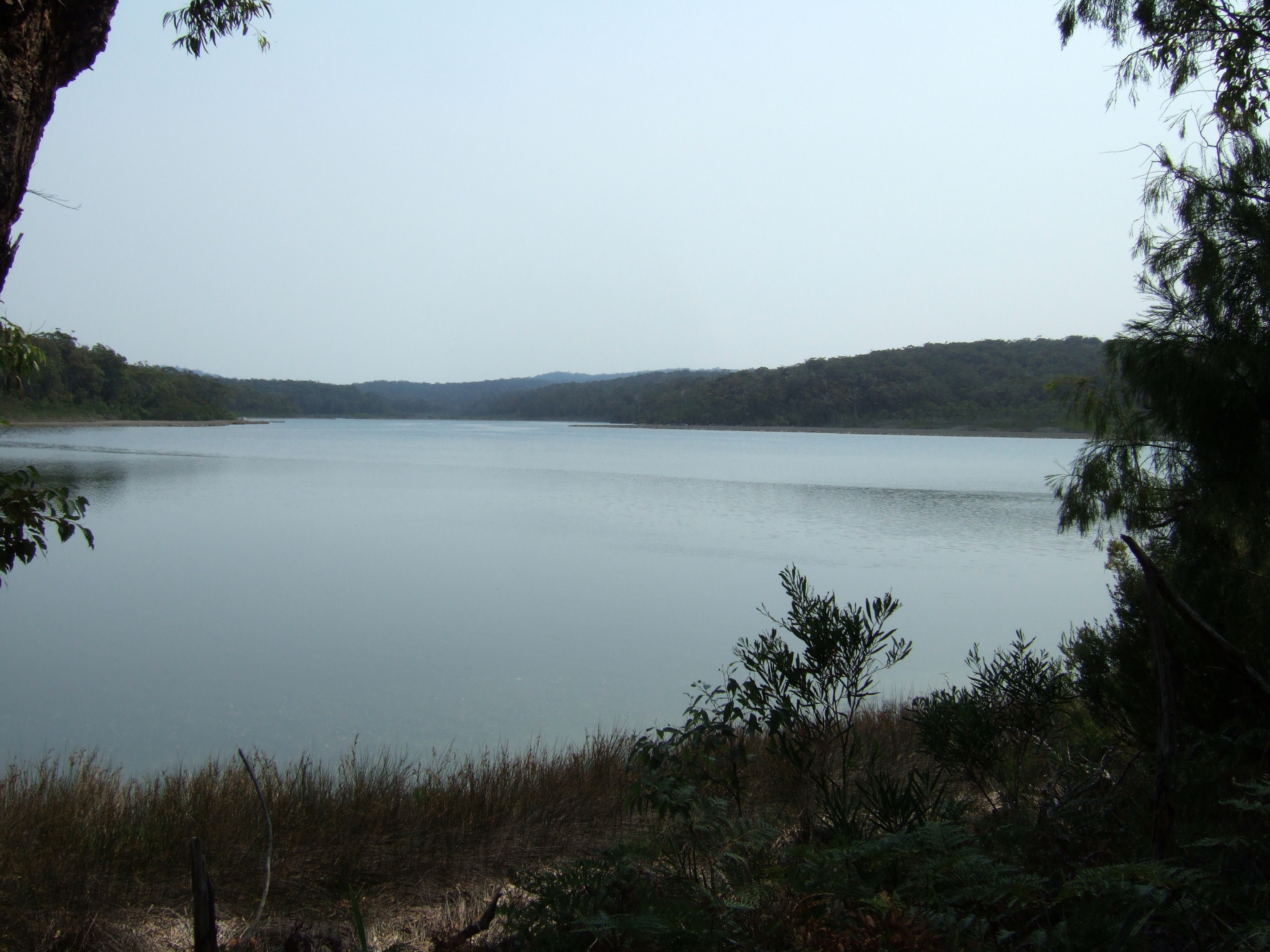
- A view of the inlet from a walking track to the beach.

- Location within Victoria
- Location: East Gippsland, Victoria
- Coordinates: 37°44′21″S 149°30′14″E
- Type: Inlet
- Primary inflows: Wingan River
- Primary outflows: Tasman Sea
- Basin countries: Australia
- Managing agency: Parks Victoria
- Surface area: 38 hectares (94 acres)

Wingan Inlet is an inlet within the Croajingolong National Park, in the East Gippsland region of Victoria, Australia.

== Features and location ==
The inlet covers a surface area of 38 hectares (94 acres) and is fed by the Wingan River and provides outflow to the Tasman Sea. It features a ranger-managed camping ground, about an hour's drive from the nearest town, Cann River, along a rough stretch of dirt road. The inlet and its surrounds are home to many species of marine life, including crabs, Sydney rock oysters and other shellfish, as well as birds and small mammals. Paralysis ticks, lace monitors and snakes are common.

The Wingan Point headland is located a few metres away from the inlet mouth.

== History ==
=== Aboriginal history ===
The traditional custodians of the land surrounding Wingan Inlet are the Australian Aboriginal Bidawal and Nindi-Ngudjam Ngarigu Monero peoples.

=== European discovery ===
Wingan Inlet is of historical significance; James Cook clearly recorded the existence of the Inlet on his chart - while naming the nearby southern headland, Ram Head on Thursday, April 19, 1780.

George Bass took shelter from bad weather near the Inlet, on 20 January 1798 in a 28 feet (8.5 m) whaleboat he named Elizabeth - during his attempt to reach the wreck of the Sydney Cove; that ran aground on Preservation Island, in Bass Strait.

Wingan Inlet is the only significant geographical feature in the area, that could be described as a lagoon that could provide shelter for a small open boat. Otherwise Bass referred to the sheltered bay and beach area in front of Wingan Inlet, that was named Fly Cove by Bass.[5] Bass' party lost an anchor in the Cove, before continuing to navigate to Wilson's Promontory where they made an attempt to cross Bass Strait to reach the Sydney Cove. Due to bad weather and a leaking boat, Bass was forced to return to the mainland and continued west where he discovered and examined Western Port.

On Bass' return voyage, they stopped at the lagoon near Cook's Ram Head to search, unsuccessfully for the whaleboat's anchor. Although Bass' expedition was unsuccessful in reaching the wreck of the Sydney Cove, due to weather and failing equipment. Upon his return to Sydney, Bass conveyed his observations of the tidal change along those parts of the coastline, and his belief of a strait separating The Mainland of Australia and Tasmania. Bass' speculations were confirmed in 1798–99, when he joined Matthew Flinders in the sloop Norfolk, when they circumnavigated Tasmania.

== See also ==
- East Gippsland Catchment Management Authority
- Morris Kenneth, George Bass in Western Port Bibliography. ISBN 0-9591787-2-4.
- Parkin Ray, H.M.Bark Endeavour. ISBN 0-522-84716-1.
- Matthew Flinders, A Voyage to Terra Australis. 1814.
- Bowden, Keith.Macrae., George Bass (Oxford University press Melbourne, 1952)
- Cargo for the Colony. The 1797 wreck of the merchant ship Sydney Cove. ISBN 978-0-9586561-7-7.
- Cuthbertson Bern, In the wake of Bass and Flinders. ISBN 0-646-40379-6.
- Estensen Mirian, The Life of George Bass. ISBN 1-74114-130-3.
