= White Rock River (New South Wales) =

River in Australia

Coordinates: 37°07′S 149°22′E

Location
- Country: Australia
- State: New South Wales
- Region: South Eastern Highlands (IBRA), Monaro
- Local government area: Snowy Monaro

Physical characteristics
- Source: White Rock Mountain
  - location: South East Forest National Park
  - elevation: 729 m (2,392 ft)
- Mouth: confluence with the Genoa River
  - location: south of Tallawalla
  - elevation: 407 m (1,335 ft)
- Length: 18 km (11 mi)

Basin features
- River system: Genoa River catchment
- National park: South East Forest

White Rock River, a perennial river of the Genoa River catchment, is located just south of the Monaro region of New South Wales, Australia.

== Course and features ==
White Rock River rises within South East Forest National Park, below White Rock Mountain, northeast of Rockton and flows generally south and then south southwest before reaching its confluence with the Genoa River, south of Tallawalla. The river descends 322 metres (1,056 ft) over its 18 kilometres (11 mi) course.

The Monaro Highway is situated adjacent to the river in its lower reaches; and the river is crossed by the Imlay Road near Nungatta.

== See also ==
- Rivers of New South Wales
- List of rivers of New South Wales (L–Z)
- List of rivers of Australia
