= Sue Hines =

Australian author, radio personality, and artist

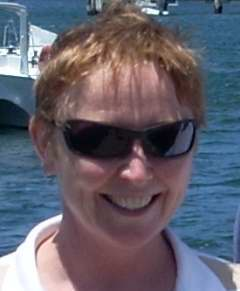
- Born: 15 July 1959 (age 67); London, England
- Education: Macquarie University
- Occupations: Author, radio presenter, watercolourist, teacher
- Notable work: Out of the Shadows, The Plunketts, The Water Boy's Story
- Awards: Australian and New Zealand Journal of Family Therapy Award for Children's Literature (1998)
- Website: http://suehineswrites.blogspot.com

Sue Hines (born 1959) is an Australian children's author, radio presenter and watercolourist. Born in London, she emigrated to Sydney in 1966.

Sue completed her secondary schooling at Cabramatta High School in south-western Sydney. In 1976, she appeared as a contestant on the daytime television talent show Pot of Gold on the Seven Network, where she performed an original song entitled 'Newspapers', and in 1977 she spent a year in Japan as a foreign exchange student. Sue studied at Macquarie University while raising her two young children as a solo parent and began her teaching career at Cherrybrook Technology High School when the school opened in 1992. In the mid-1990s she moved to Goulburn and then to Canberra, where she taught English and ESL at a number of secondary schools. In 2012, she moved to Mallacoota in East Gippsland and worked as a part-time teacher at Cann River P-12 College, the state's smallest school.

Sue has written three young adult novels and short stories for younger readers and has taught seminars in creative writing for secondary school students. Her first novel, Out of the Shadows, was awarded the Australian and New Zealand Journal of Family Therapy 1998 Award Prize for Children's Literature (Older Readers). More recently, she has been one of the judges for the E.J. Brady Mallacoota Prize Short Story Competition since 2013. In 2016, Sue became a regular presenter on the local radio station 3MGB-FM.

== Works ==
=== Young adult novels ===
- Out of the Shadows (1998)
- The Plunketts (2000)
- The Water Boy's Story (2008)

=== Stories for younger readers ===
- 'Spiders!' in Spider Mania (2001)
- 'Nuts!' in Greening the Earth (2002)
- 'And Then I Woke Up' in Fright Night (2002)

== Awards ==
- 1998 Family Award for Children's Literature (Older Readers)
