= Bicentenary of James Cook in Australia =

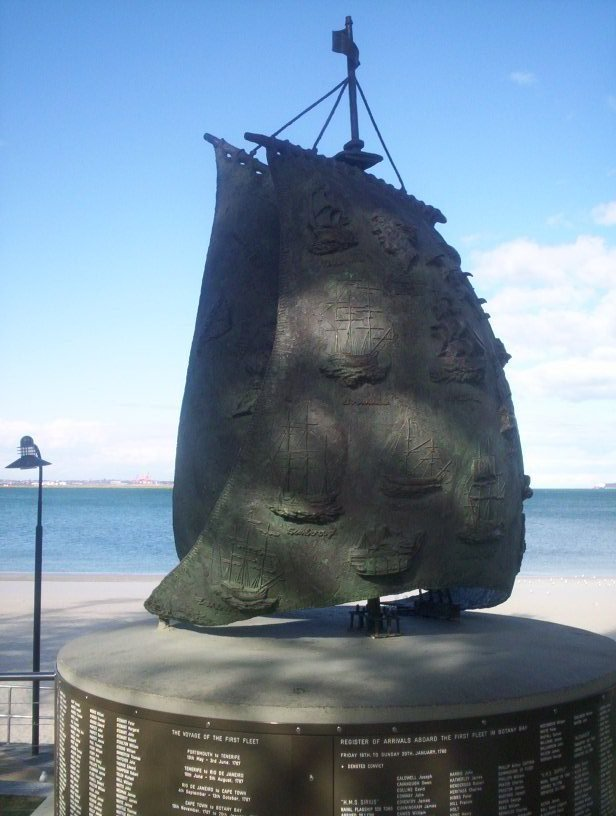
A monument to Cook's landing at Botany Bay.

The Bicentenary of James Cook in Australia was commemorated in Australia in 1970. The British explorer Lieutenant (later Captain) James Cook charted the east coast of Australia in 1770, and claimed the eastern seaboard of the continent for the British Crown. It was not considered the official bicentenary of Australia, but rather the bicentenary of the first mapping of the eastern coastline.

Commemorations were held throughout Australia in 1970. A commemorative 50 cent coin was issued. A re-enactment of Cook's landing at Botany Bay was held on 29 April 1970. The re-enactment was disrupted by university students, one of whom was dressed as James Cook, arriving at the point on speedboat. The name of the place on the east coast which Cook is believed to have first sighted was renamed from Cape Everard to Point Hicks, the name Cook had given it.

== Protest ==
Indigenous Australian leaders declared 29 April a "Day of Mourning", and an overnight protest vigil was held at the Botany Bay re-enactment site.

== See also ==
- Australian Bicentenary
