= SS Saros =

Coordinates: 37°48′13″S 149°16′31″E

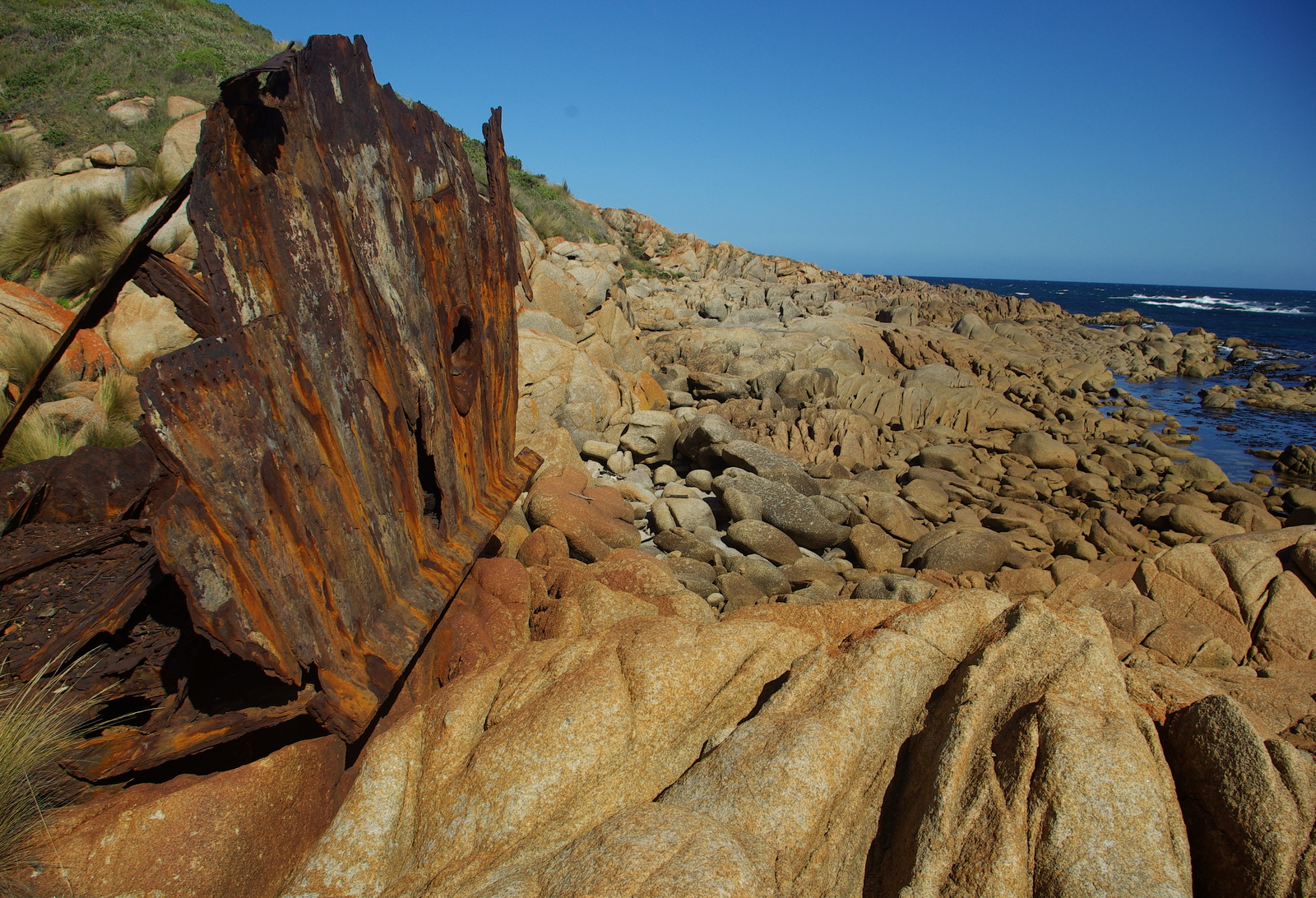

History
- Owner: Australian Steamships Company
- Port of registry: Australia
- Builder: W. Gray Co Ltd.
- Laid down: 1910
- Launched: 26 March 1910
- Identification: Official number: 128911
- Fate: Aground 1937

General characteristics
- Type: Steamship
- Tonnage: 2044 tons
- Length: 350.1 ft (106.7 m)
- Beam: 46.5 ft (14.2 m)
- Depth: 22.4 ft (6.8 m)
- Installed power: Steam
- Propulsion: Screw
- Crew: 39

SS Saros was a 2044-ton steamship which was wrecked at Point Hicks, in what is now Croajingolong National Park. Helmed by a Captain Aitken, it left Geelong bound for Sydney on 23 December 1937, but ran aground in heavy fog. All crew on board were rescued after a distress signal brought assistance from other ships.

Remnants from the wreckage are still visible to walkers in the area.
