= Genoa River =

River in Australia

Genoa River Bondi Creek, Yard Creek
- Mouth of the Genoa River, in Victoria

Location
- Country: Australia
- States: New South Wales, Victoria
- Region: South Eastern Highlands, South East Corner (IBRA), Monaro, East Gippsland
- Local government areas: Snowy Monaro, East Gippsland
- Town: Genoa

Physical characteristics
- Source: Nungatta Mountain
  - location: south of Bombala, Monaro, New South Wales
  - elevation: 729 m (2,392 ft)
- Mouth: Tasman Sea, South Pacific Ocean
  - location: Mallacoota Inlet, East Gippsland, Victoria
  - coordinates: 37°33′41″S 149°45′57″E
  - elevation: 0 m (0 ft)
- Length: 95 km (59 mi)

Basin features
- Tributaries
  - left: Bondi Creek, White Rock River, Nungatta Creek, Yambulla Creek, Wangarabell Creek, Big Flat Creek, Maramingo Creek, Wallagaraugh River
  - right: Hopping Joe Creek, Black Jack Gully, Murmuring Creek, Jones Creek (Victoria), Three Mile Creek (Victoria), Stony Creek (Victoria), Genoa Creek
- National parks: Coopracambra, Merragunegin Reference Area

Genoa River is a perennial river located in the Monaro region of New South Wales and flows into the East Gippsland region of Victoria in Australia. It used to be known as Bondi Creek or Yard Creek. The river's name derives from the First People "jinoor" ("footpath").

== Course and features ==
Genoa River rises below Nungatta Mountain, south of Bombala in New South Wales, and flows generally north, then south, crossing the Black-Allan Line that forms part of the border between Victoria and New South Wales, and then southeast flowing through the Coopracambra National Park, joined by fifteen tributaries including the White Rock River and Wallagaraugh River, before reaching its river mouth of the Tasman Sea of the South Pacific Ocean at the Mallacoota Inlet in Victoria. The river descends 728 metres (2,388 ft) over its 95 kilometres (59 mi) course.

The Monaro Highway crosses the river in its upper reaches between Bombala and Cann River; and the Princes Highway crosses the river in its lower reaches at Genoa.

== See also ==
- Rivers of New South Wales
- List of rivers of New South Wales (A–K)
- List of rivers of Australia
