= Cape Howe =

Point in Australia

- Cape
- Location on map of New South Wales
- Coordinates: 37°30′S 149°58′E
- Location: Australia

Cape Howe is a coastal headland in eastern Australia, forming the south-eastern end of the Black-Allan Line, a portion of the border between New South Wales and Victoria.

== History ==
Cape Howe was named by Captain Cook when he passed it on 20 April 1770, honouring Admiral Earl Howe who was Treasurer of the British Royal Navy at the time. The coordinates Cook gave are almost exactly the modern surveyed location.

== See also ==
- Cape Howe Marine National Park
