= Point Hicks =

Point in Australia

Point Hicks Cape Everard
- Cape
- Location of Point Hicks in Victoria
- Coordinates: 37°48′11″S 149°16′32″E
- Location: South East Corner (IBRA), Victoria, Australia

Point Hicks (formerly called Cape Everard), is a coastal headland in the East Gippsland region of Victoria, Australia, located within the Croajingolong National Park. The point is marked by the Point Hicks Lighthouse that faces the Tasman Sea.

The traditional custodians of the land surrounding Point Hicks are the Australian Aboriginal Bidawal and Gunaikurnai peoples who called the point Tolywiarar. In April 1770 this area became the first land on the east coast of Australia known to have been sighted by Europeans, when HMS Endeavour reached the continent during the first voyage of James Cook to the Pacific.

== Name ==
The point is named after Lieutenant Zachary Hicks of the Endeavour who, in April 1770, first saw land presumed to be the east coast of New Holland.

== History ==
After charting New Zealand during his first voyage of discovery, Cook set a course westwards, intending to strike for Van Diemen's Land (present-day Tasmania) to establish whether or not it formed part of the presumed southern continent. However, he was forced to maintain a more northerly course owing to prevailing gales, and sailed on until 19 April 1770, when land was sighted at 6 a.m. Two hours later, Cook made a further observation of land and named it Point Hicks. Cook recorded the event thus:

the Southermost [sic] Point of land we had in sight which bore from us W1/4S I judged to lay in the Latitude of 38°..0' S° and in the Longitude of 211°..07' W ^{t} from the Meridian of Greenwich. I have named it Point Hicks, because Lieut ^{t} Hicks was the first who discover'd this land.

Cook calculated that Van Diemen's Land ought to lie due south of their position, but having found the coastline trending to the south-west, recorded his doubt that this landmass was connected to it.

Cook's manuscript chart of Australia's east coast, starts at a point he named Point Hicks and gave its coordinates as 38°0'S and 148°53'E. However, the coordinates recorded are several miles off-shore, in 50 fathoms (91 m) of water. It has been variously suggested that Cook was deceived by a cloud bank, a compass error, or a faulty observation. Margaret Cameron-Ash, however, claims that Cook deliberately falsified his charts and coordinates in order to hide the existence of Bass Strait for reasons of military and colonial policy. Those claims have been vigorously challenged as lacking in any sound evidence.

Nevertheless, it is likely that Cook's "Point of land" was not today's Point Hicks, and lies somewhat to the south-west.

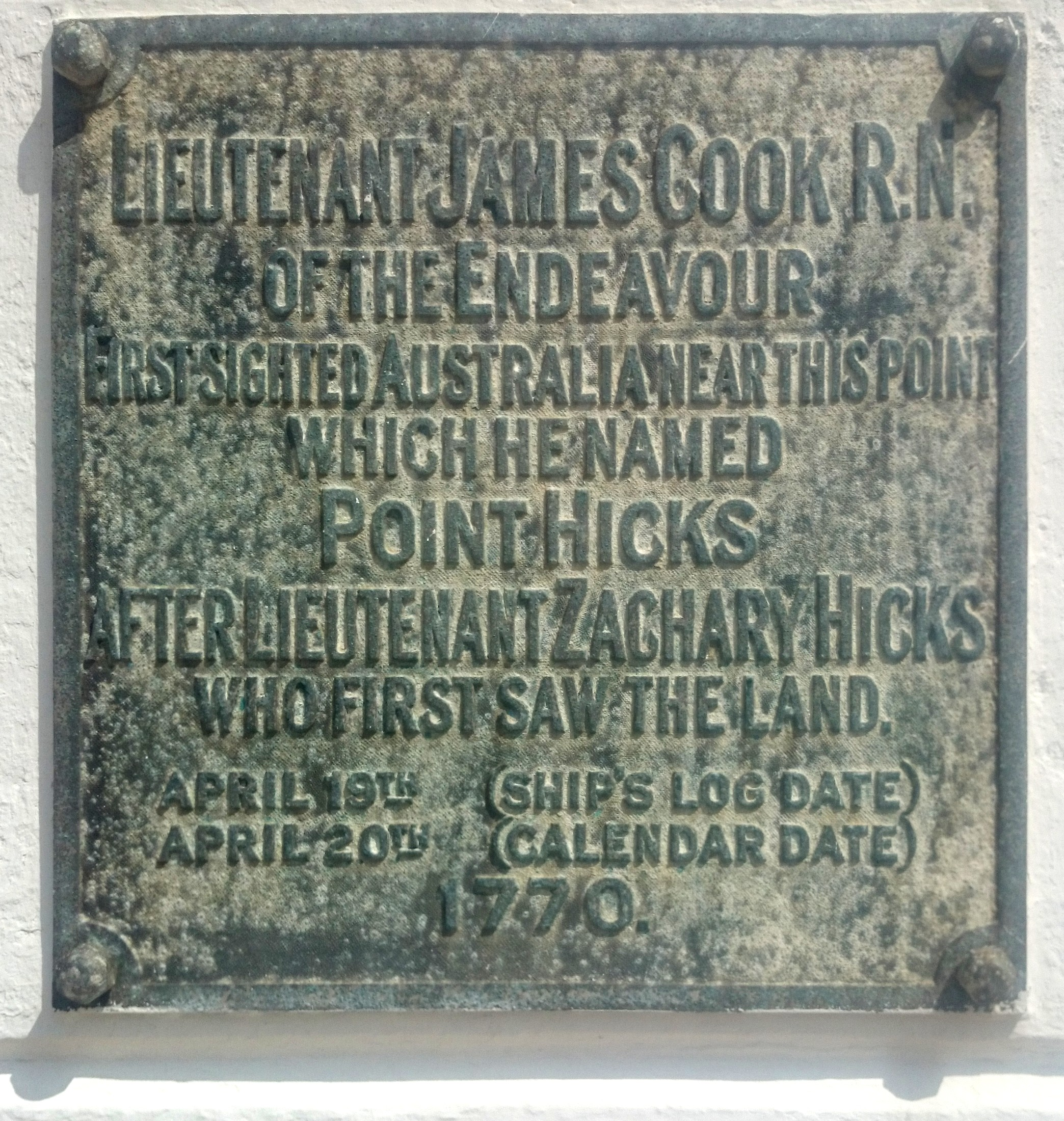
The plaque on the landward side of the obelisk at Point Hicks, Victoria, Australia.

At the end of 1797, George Bass sailed past the area in an open whale-boat and was unable to identify the point. Although Matthew Flinders sailed past the area in 1798–99 and again in 1802–03, the coastal area near Point Hicks was always out of Flinders' visual range. When drawing his chart, Flinders relied on Bass's observations, thus omitting Point Hicks. The name Point Hicks was still being used on some maps up until 1840.

The first use of the name Cape Everard has been attributed to hydrographer John Lort Stokes, who surveyed the coast in the Beagle in 1843. It was presumed he named it after fellow naval officer James Everard Home. Stokes' maps do not record the name, but many secondary sources attribute its introduction to him. The first known map showing Cape Everard was made in 1852 and published in 1853, by surveyor George Douglas Smythe. If he coined the name, then, according to one theory, he may have been referring to William Everard, a South Australian Commissioner of Crown Lands. The name Cape Everard was adopted after 1853 and was used until 1970, when the location was renamed Point Hicks.

Despite the use of the name Cape Everard to designate the promontory, Cook's original name of Point Hicks was recorded on an obelisk-shaped monument erected by the Australian Government on the site in 1924. The inscription on the landward side of the monument reads:

"Lieutenant James Cook, R.N. Of the Endeavour, First Sighted Australia Near This Point, Which He Named Point Hicks After Lieutenant Zachary Hicks Who First Saw the Land. April 19th (Ship's Log Date). April 20th (Calendar Date). 1770." On the seaward side of the monument is a plaque listing the "Ship's Company of H.M. Bark Endeavour April 20th 1770".

In the 1930s, the Australian businessman and philanthropist, Russell Grimwade, commissioned stone to be quarried from Cape Everard and shipped to Great Ayton in Yorkshire. It was used to create a replica monument with an identical plaque, which was placed at the site of the home of Captain Cook's parents, after Grimwade had arranged for the home to be dismantled and reconstructed in Fitzroy Gardens, Melbourne, in 1934.

Cook's name, Point Hicks, was officially established as the name of the cape as part of the commemoration of the bicentenary of Cook's 1770 voyage. Victorian Premier Henry Bolte proclaimed the new name in a ceremony at the point on 20 April 1970.

== Climate ==
Point Hicks has a mild oceanic climate (Cfb) with pleasant summers and cool damp winters.

Climate data for Point Hicks
| Month | Jan | Feb | Mar | Apr | May | Jun | Jul | Aug | Sep | Oct | Nov | Dec | Year |
|---|---|---|---|---|---|---|---|---|---|---|---|---|---|
| Record high °C (°F) | 42.7 (108.9) | 41.0 (105.8) | 37.8 (100.0) | 35.6 (96.1) | 29.6 (85.3) | 22.7 (72.9) | 24.0 (75.2) | 29.2 (84.6) | 36.4 (97.5) | 35.5 (95.9) | 43.4 (110.1) | 41.4 (106.5) | 43.4 (110.1) |
| Mean daily maximum °C (°F) | 24.0 (75.2) | 23.9 (75.0) | 22.3 (72.1) | 19.9 (67.8) | 17.1 (62.8) | 14.8 (58.6) | 14.3 (57.7) | 15.0 (59.0) | 16.6 (61.9) | 18.8 (65.8) | 20.3 (68.5) | 22.3 (72.1) | 19.1 (66.4) |
| Mean daily minimum °C (°F) | 15.9 (60.6) | 16.1 (61.0) | 15.1 (59.2) | 13.1 (55.6) | 11.1 (52.0) | 9.1 (48.4) | 8.2 (46.8) | 8.5 (47.3) | 9.6 (49.3) | 11.0 (51.8) | 12.7 (54.9) | 14.3 (57.7) | 12.1 (53.8) |
| Record low °C (°F) | 1.6 (34.9) | 6.6 (43.9) | 6.0 (42.8) | 6.0 (42.8) | 2.8 (37.0) | 2.2 (36.0) | −2.0 (28.4) | 1.1 (34.0) | 1.8 (35.2) | 3.1 (37.6) | 4.9 (40.8) | 6.3 (43.3) | −2.0 (28.4) |
| Average precipitation mm (inches) | 62.8 (2.47) | 57.8 (2.28) | 67.4 (2.65) | 85.6 (3.37) | 93.5 (3.68) | 112.0 (4.41) | 96.9 (3.81) | 79.2 (3.12) | 75.7 (2.98) | 74.8 (2.94) | 82.0 (3.23) | 72.0 (2.83) | 960.2 (37.80) |
| Average precipitation days | 9.6 | 8.8 | 10.5 | 12.0 | 13.5 | 14.3 | 13.9 | 14.1 | 13.9 | 13.7 | 12.5 | 10.9 | 147.7 |
| Average relative humidity (%) | 71 | 72 | 73 | 73 | 76 | 76 | 74 | 72 | 73 | 73 | 72 | 73 | 73 |
Source: (1966–2019)

== See also ==
- Mueller River (Victoria)
- Point Hicks Marine National Park
- SS Saros
- Thurra River
