= Alfred National Park =

National park in Victoria, Australia

- IUCN category II (national park)
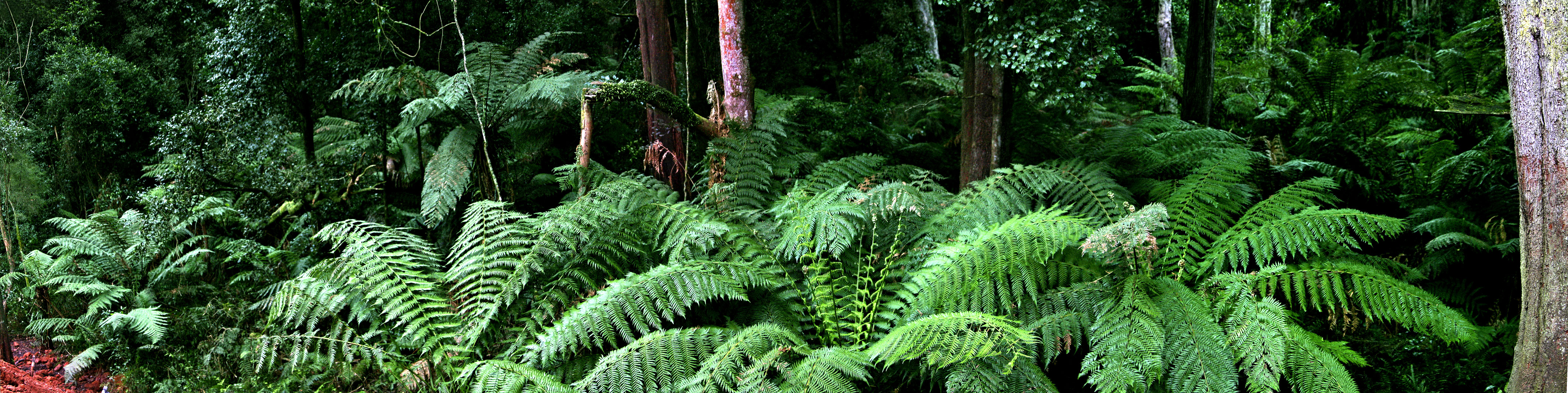
- Ferns within the Alfred National Park

- Location within Victoria
- Location: Victoria
- Nearest city: Cann River
- Coordinates: 37°34′17″S 149°21′37″E
- Area: 30.50 km^{2} (11.78 sq mi)
- Established: 1925
- Governing body: Parks Victoria
- Website: http://parkweb.vic.gov.au/explore/parks/alfred-national-park

The Alfred National Park is a national park located in the East Gippsland region of the Australian state of Victoria. The 3,050-hectare (7,500-acre) national park is situated approximately 388 kilometres (241 mi) east of Melbourne and was declared in 1925.

It is currently closed due to widespread bushfire damage.

The park is dissected by the Princes Highway, between Cann River and Genoa.

== Features ==
The park reserves examples of warm temperate rainforest, particularly the jungle of Mount Drummer. Compared to the tropical rainforests of Queensland and New South Wales, this is a floristically depauperate forest, representing as it does the southern limit of this flora. This region is biogeographically interesting as the meeting point between the subtropical flora of the north of Australia and the cool temperate and arid zone floras of the south and west. The rainforest community consists of a closed canopy of Lilly Pilly Acmena smithii with numerous lianas, ferns, and epiphytes. The park is particularly known for the occurrence of four varieties of tree ferns and epiphytic orchids such as the orange-blossom orchid Sarcochilus falcatus and the rock orchid Dendrobium speciosum. In the 1983 "Ash Wednesday" bushfires, the park was burned very badly.

== See also ==
- Protected areas of Victoria
