= Timbillica, New South Wales =

Timbillica New South Wales
- Coordinates: 37°21′54″S 149°42′4″E
- Population: 0 (2021 census)
- Postcode(s): 2551
- Location: 92.9 km (58 mi) NE of Bega
- LGA(s): Bega Valley Shire
- State electorate(s): Bega
- Federal division(s): Eden-Monaro

Timbillica is a locality in the Bega Valley Shire of New South Wales, Australia.

== Demographics ==
As of the 2021 Australian census, no people resided in Timbillica, down from 9 in the 2016 census. At the 2016 census, the median age of persons in Timbillica was 56 years. There were fewer males than females, with 37.5% of the population male and 62.5% female. The average household size was 2 people per household.
