= Mallacoota =

- Town
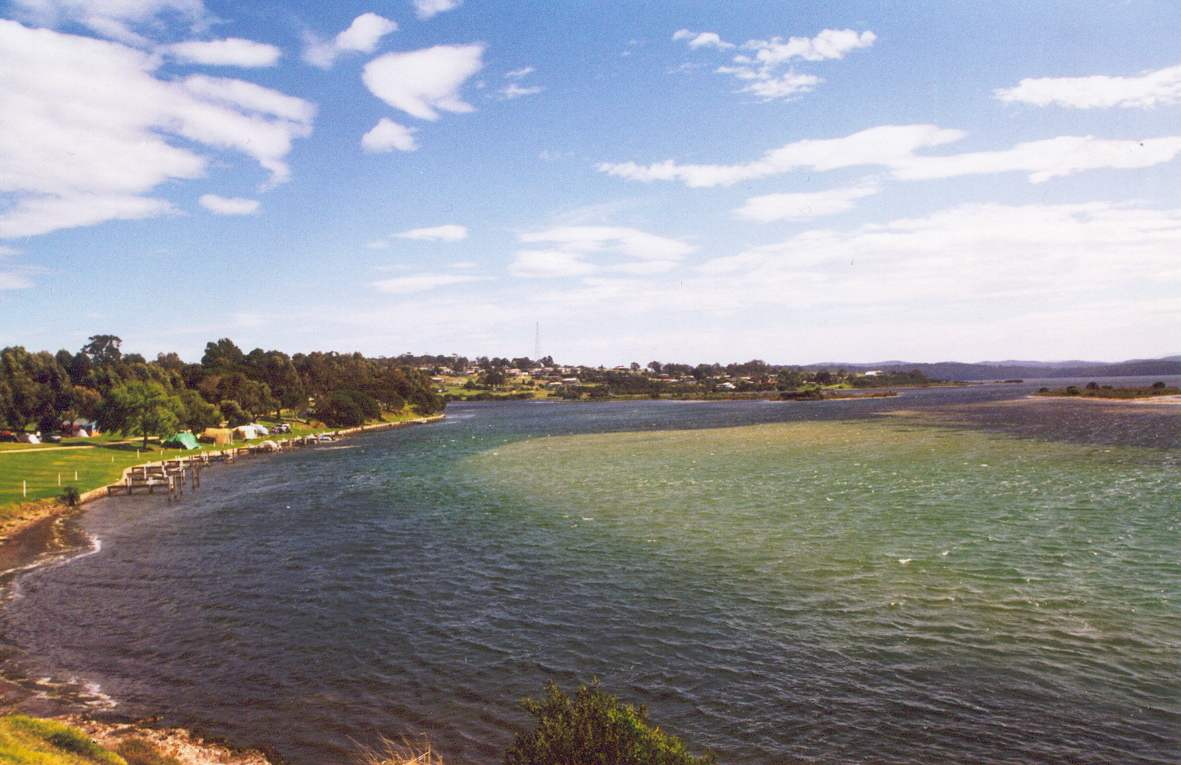
- Mallacoota

- Interactive map of Mallacoota
- Coordinates: 37°33′0″S 149°45′0″E
- Country: Australia
- State: Victoria
- LGA: Shire of East Gippsland
- Location: 523 km (325 mi) E of Melbourne; 368 km (229 mi) S of Canberra; 150 km (93 mi) E of Orbost; 526 km (327 mi) S of Sydney; 86 km (53 mi) S of Eden (NSW)

Government
  - State electorate: Gippsland East
  - Federal division: Gippsland
- Elevation: 22 m (72 ft)

Population
  - Total: 1,183 (2021 census)
- Postcode: 3892
- Mean max temp: 19.6 °C (67.3 °F)
- Mean min temp: 10.9 °C (51.6 °F)
- Annual rainfall: 897.0 mm (35.31 in)

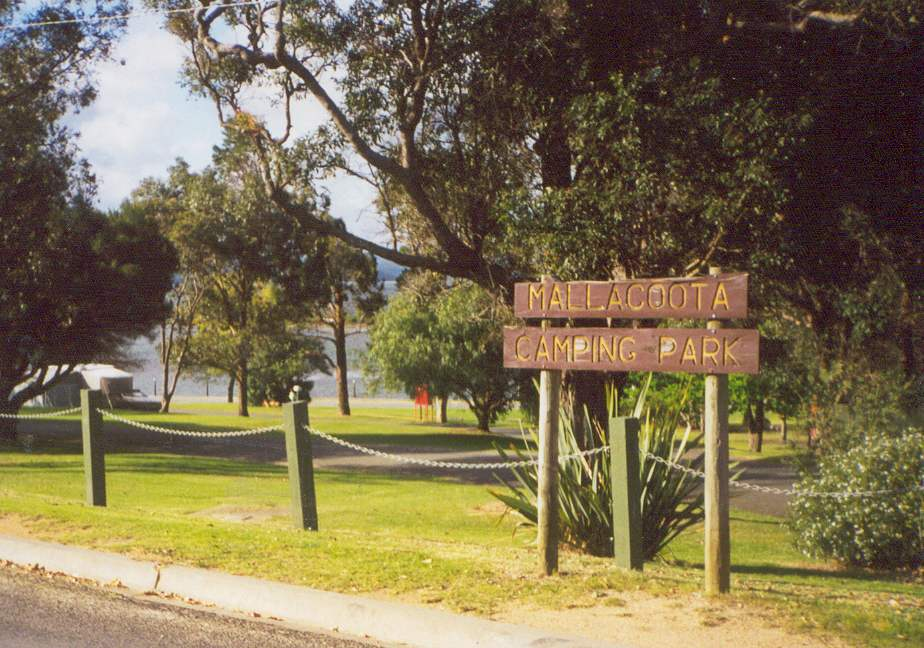
Mallacoota Camping Park

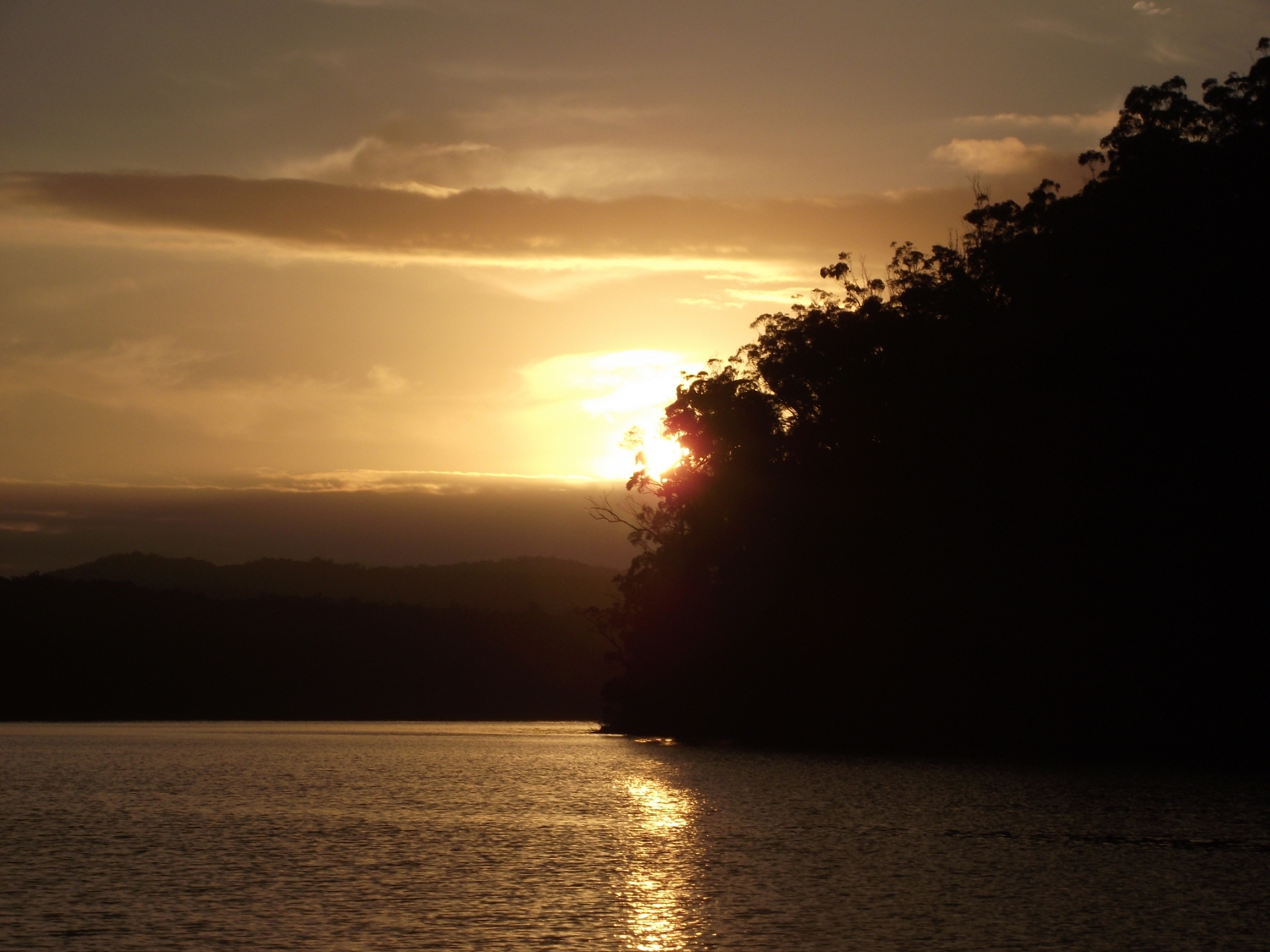
Mallacoota Lake sunset

Mallacoota is a town in the East Gippsland region in the state of Victoria, Australia. At the 2021 census, Mallacoota had a population of 1,183. It is the last official township on Victoria's east coast before the border with New South Wales. Mallacoota has a regional airport (Mallacoota Airport) YMCO (XMC) consisting of a gravel runway for light planes and an asphalt runway for commercial planes flying from Melbourne.

It is a popular holiday spot for boating, fishing, walking the wilderness coast, swimming, birdwatching, and surfing. The Mallacoota Arts Council runs events throughout each year. Mallacoota Inlet is one of the main villages along the wilderness coastal walk from New South Wales to Victoria, and Gipsy Point is located at the head of the inlet.

== History ==
The area was part of the territory of the Bidawal people for thousands of years. The meaning of the name Mallacoota has been suggested as meeting place, but according to Bruce Pascoe and others, it means "sacred pipe clay", and was known to clans all around the area, who used to use the clay.

Shore-based whaling may have taken place in the area in 1841 under the direction of Captain John Stevenson.

Settlers started to arrive in the 1830s. A small timber lighthouse was installed on nearby Gabo Island in 1854, and the existing granite lighthouse was completed in 1862. By the 1880s commercial fishing was well established, with some catch being shipped south to Melbourne. At the same time the first tourists started to arrive. Gold was discovered in 1894, after which the Spotted Dog Mine operated for three years. Mallacoota Post Office opened on 7 May 1894 and Mallacoota West in 1901. In 1928 Mallacoota West was renamed Mallacoota, and Mallacoota became Mallacoota East (closing in 1940). A satellite airfield was constructed during World War II for the purpose of coastal defence. During the 20th century the logging, farming and fishing industries in the area declined, and the tourism and abalone industries grew. The town's largest employer, the abalone co-operative, was formed in 1967.

In December 2019, fires in the East Gippsland region had a "significant impact" on Mallacoota and the nearby town of Genoa.

== Geography ==
Mallacoota is one of the most isolated towns in the state of Victoria, 25 kilometres (16 mi) off the Princes Highway and 523 kilometres (325 mi) and six hours from Melbourne. It is 526 kilometres (327 mi) and seven hours from Sydney, New South Wales. It is halfway between Melbourne and Sydney when travelling via Princes Highway, though the Princes is a longer route between Australia's two main cities compared to the Hume Highway. It is known for its wild flowers, abalone industry, the inlet estuary consisting of Top Lake and Bottom Lake, and Croajingolong National Park that surround it.

Gipsy Point is located at the head of Mallacoota Inlet, and is especially known for its bird life.

== Sport ==
Golfers play at the course of the Mallacoota Golf and Country Club on Nelson Drive.

The Sydney Swans' 2005 premiership winning defender and former St Kilda player Sean Dempster hails from Mallacoota.

Mallacoota has a soccer club called the Mallacoota Blues. The club ranging from junior age groups to senior age groups plays in the Far South Coast Football Association (FSCFA). Mallacoota is also the host to the annual Mallacoota Cup soccer tournament.

Whale watchings for migrating and residential species such as the endemic, endangered Burrunan dolphins, southern right whales, and humpback whales, are available on many locations along the coasts in their migration seasons.

Fishing competitions are also popular in the town of Mallacoota with many being held on weekends throughout the year. These weekends help to support individual businesses with the number of people that visit the small town.

== 2019-2020 bushfires ==
=== Cause ===
On the late afternoon of 28 December, a lightning strike near Wingan River started a bushfire which burned southward towards the coast, roughly 40 km away despite mild conditions and little wind. Expected wind changes and catastrophic fire conditions predicted for the days to follow highlighted the risk to the township if the fire remained uncontrolled.

=== Warnings ===
Evacuation warnings were given to the potential fire impact area of East Gippsland at 3:00 pm on 28 December resulting in over 30,000 holidaymakers exiting the East Gippsland region in the days to follow. Mallacoota and Cann River were excluded at that time from the warnings. Three Country Fire Authority (CFA) strike teams, about 95 volunteer firefighters with 18 tankers and three command vehicles, were sent to the town immediately after the fire started on 28 December to assist the local CFA brigade and other emergency services, they arrived in the town early night the same day. Local emergency services estimated 10,000 people were in the town at the time the CFA strike teams arrived, including up to 2,000 residents. At 1:00 pm on 29 December a "watch and act" notified residents it was too late to leave, stranding thousands in town after the Princes Highway to Melbourne was closed. This was despite roads to New South Wales being safe to travel. At 8:34 pm on 29 December the roads to Melbourne were reopened but the emergency warnings continued to advise people in the township it was safest to stay. The official emergency warning advice remained that it was safest to remain in Mallacoota despite all exits being available as there was a reasonable estimate of roads, mainly the one towards Melbourne, being impacted if the predicted conditions developed suddenly. On 30 December at 11:00 am, local authorities alerted residents and visitors of the fire-front and shelter plans during an announced makeshift township meeting, not everyone in town chose to attend the meeting despite it being widely announced. The general advice through the meeting was that those wanting to leave could do so, but only via the North to Eden and Canberra, this still deterred many of the residents and visitors that attended the meeting from evacuating. The roads were officially closed two hours after the meeting and the estimate was of 1,000 residents and 3,000 visitors still in the township for the remainder of the incident.

=== Impact ===
A southwest wind change pushed the fire through the Croajingolong National Park towards the town, roughly 60 km from the point of ignition within a few hours during the early hours of 31 December as a control line could not be established by Fire Management Victoria due to rough terrain and aircraft suppression was also unsuccessful the previous two days. An emergency warning was given at 4:40 pm on 30 December for all to relocate to a safe evacuation location. This was the local hall or the wharf. Many boat owners launched their boats into the water and sheltered on the lake. It is reported that more than 50 boat owners with up to 300 people were on the lake on the evening of 30 December. The town was evacuated towards the main wharf, and into the hall, directly east of Mallacoota Airport and stayed there for over 24 hours. Aircraft suppression could not be committed on 31 December as the fire created its own weather system and thermal imaging of the fire could not be obtained accurately due to the thick layered smoke plume generated by the fire which turned day into night during the morning of that day at the location. At approximately 8:00 am on 31 December a firestorm reached the industrial area of the township with the fire-front itself estimated to have been around 10 km wide, to which the CFA responded. Large sections of the town were lost during the hours that followed (mainly in Genoa Road and Terra Nova Drive) with over 135 homes destroyed and many others damaged, but the central areas of the town where people were sheltering and most of the town's significant infrastructure was saved from the fire-front which passed and continued its path North North East towards the border with New South Wales. The CFA and other emergency services personnel continued to work well into the morning of 1 January. No human fatalities were recorded.

=== Post fires ===
Despite the immediate threat passing, the fires continued to burn in and around the town. In the late afternoon of 31 December people started to leave their shelters and return to their houses. Many areas of the town were cut off from direct access due to active fires, including Mirrabooka Road and Lakeside Drive. In the early hours of the morning of 1 January thick smoke engulfed the town resulting in a panicked community seeking medical assistance and evacuation. This resulted in over 200 medical presentations to the Medical Centre in a single day and stores of Ventolin inhalers being depleted with the local pharmacy supplies being exhausted before the arrival of the fires. The CFA strike teams (personnel only) were extracted by air around mid-day on 1 January as fresh replacements could safely be deployed at “shift-change”.

=== Evacuation ===
On 2 January the Royal Australian Navy arrived in Mallacoota bringing a small supply of essential medical supplies and 8000 litres of diesel fuel. On 3 January it commenced the large civil evacuation due to hundreds of kilometres of the damaged road preventing access to Mallacoota and surrounding towns. Nearly 1000 people and pets were evacuated on HMAS Choules with a 20-hour trip to Hastings. There was far fewer than the initially estimated numbers, with as few as 3,000 people in the region at the time the fires hit. A further 450 people were evacuated by the Royal Australian Air Force once visibility allowed for air evacuation.

On 5 January the fires threatening Mallacoota were feared to have joined up with the Batemans Bay fires and were threatening the town of Eden, New South Wales.

=== Recovery ===
Roads for residents opened on the 18 January to allow them to cross the border to New South Wales to buy supplies. The Australia Day weekend provided an opportunity for campers and visitors to return in convoys to collect their belongings, but were required to leave immediately. By 6 February all roads into Mallacoota were opened.

== Climate ==
Mallacoota has an oceanic climate (Cfb) according to Köppen system. The town's warmer winter temperatures compared with those of Melbourne, despite the two being at similar latitudes, are attributed to the foehn effect.

Climate data for Mallacoota (1991–2020 averages, 1974–2022 extremes)
Month	Jan	Feb	Mar	Apr	May	Jun	Jul	Aug	Sep	Oct	Nov	Dec	Year
Record high °C (°F)	42.0 (107.6)	41.6 (106.9)	36.9 (98.4)	37.2 (99.0)	26.7 (80.1)	22.2 (72.0)	23.5 (74.3)	26.6 (79.9)	35.2 (95.4)	36.2 (97.2)	40.7 (105.3)	41.6 (106.9)	42.0 (107.6)
Mean daily maximum °C (°F)	24.3 (75.7)	24.0 (75.2)	22.5 (72.5)	20.2 (68.4)	17.6 (63.7)	15.4 (59.7)	15.0 (59.0)	15.7 (60.3)	17.5 (63.5)	19.2 (66.6)	20.9 (69.6)	22.3 (72.1)	19.6 (67.3)
Mean daily minimum °C (°F)	15.8 (60.4)	15.7 (60.3)	14.3 (57.7)	11.8 (53.2)	9.3 (48.7)	7.3 (45.1)	6.3 (43.3)	6.4 (43.5)	8.3 (46.9)	10.0 (50.0)	12.2 (54.0)	13.8 (56.8)	10.9 (51.6)
Record low °C (°F)	6.8 (44.2)	6.6 (43.9)	6.5 (43.7)	4.0 (39.2)	2.4 (36.3)	0.7 (33.3)	0.4 (32.7)	0.5 (32.9)	0.7 (33.3)	2.9 (37.2)	3.2 (37.8)	5.6 (42.1)	0.4 (32.7)
Average precipitation mm (inches)	62.8 (2.47)	70.0 (2.76)	70.6 (2.78)	84.5 (3.33)	75.8 (2.98)	96.5 (3.80)	80.4 (3.17)	65.9 (2.59)	68.5 (2.70)	73.3 (2.89)	80.3 (3.16)	68.6 (2.70)	897.0 (35.31)
Average precipitation days	8.9	9.0	9.7	10.9	13.2	15.2	13.8	12.8	12.7	12.4	11.1	9.7	139.4
Average relative humidity (%)	66	69	66	67	68	69	65	63	64	65	65	66	66
Source 1: Bureau of Meteorology, Mallacoota (1991–2020)
Source 2: Bureau of Meteorology, Mallacoota (all years)

== Notable people ==
- E. J. Brady (1869–1952) author and poet
- Sean Dempster (born 1984) Australian rules footballer
- Sue Hines (born 1959) children's author
- Bruce Pascoe (born 1947) Indigenous Australian author
