= Croajingolong National Park =

National park in Australia

- IUCN category II (national park)
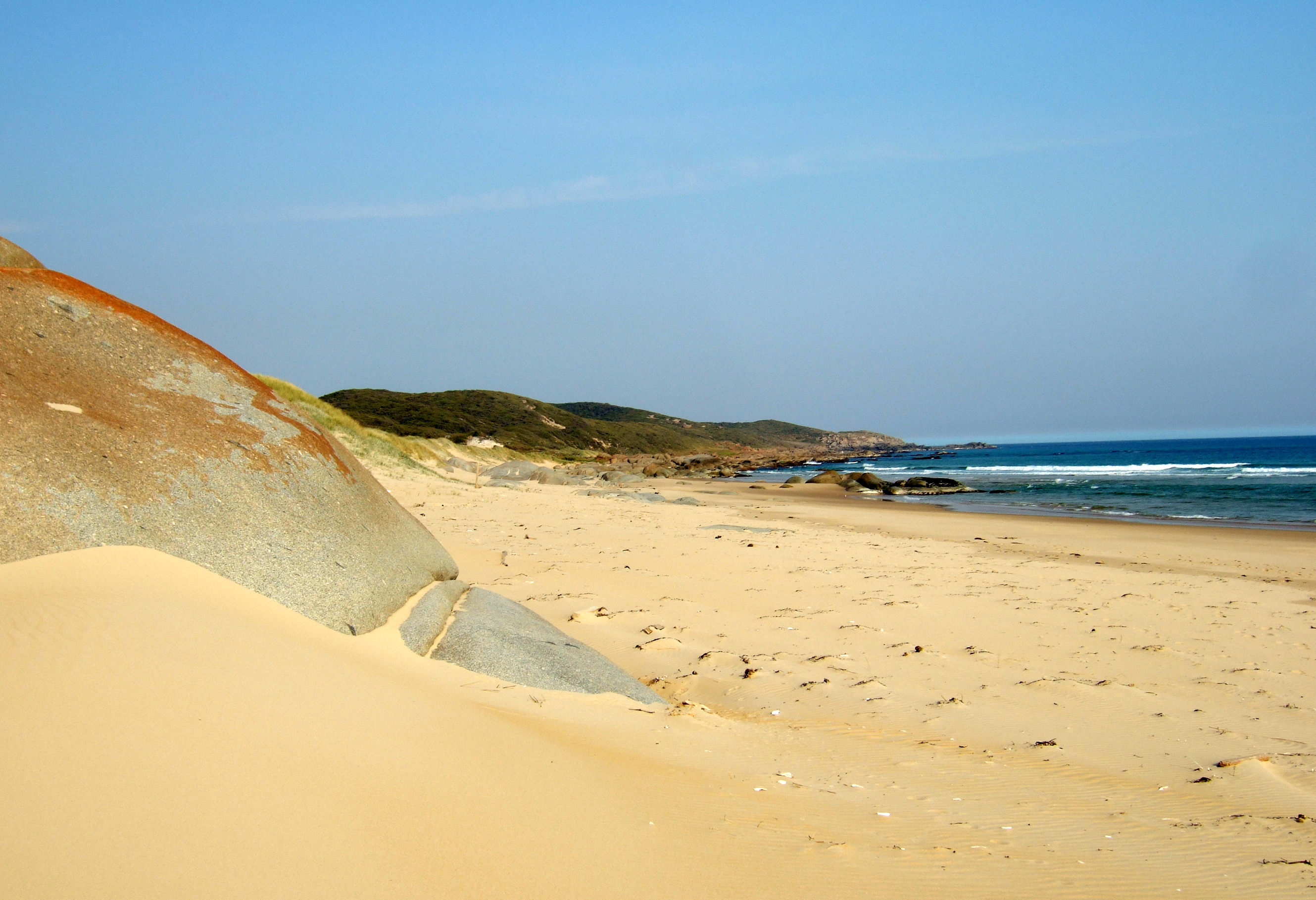
- A beach in the Croajingolong National Park; looking north towards Rame Head.

- Location within Victoria
- Location: Victoria
- Nearest city: Mallacoota
- Coordinates: 37°42′43″S 149°30′30″E
- Area: 883.55 km^{2} (341.14 sq mi)
- Established: 26 April 1979
- Governing body: Parks Victoria
- Website: https://www.parks.vic.gov.au/places-to-see/parks/croajingolong-national-park

The Croajingolong National Park is a coastal national park located in the East Gippsland region of the Australian state of Victoria. The 88,355-hectare (218,330-acre) national park is situated approximately 450 kilometres (280 mi) east of Melbourne and 500 kilometres (310 mi) south of Sydney.

The name Croajingolong derives from the Australian Aboriginal Krauatungalung words galung, meaning "belonging to" and kraua, meaning "east".

== Location and features ==
The park is linear in shape and bordered on the southern side by the Tasman Sea of the South Pacific Ocean, the western side by Bemm River and the eastern side by the township of Mallacoota. Its northern boundary consists of dense bushland and low hills. The dimensions of the park are approximately 80 kilometres (50 mi) by 20 kilometres (12 mi), with an area of 875 square kilometres (338 sq mi). The 100 kilometres (62 mi) Wilderness Coast Walk stretches the entire length of the park along beaches, through heathland and round rocky headlands.

Croajingolong National Park, with the adjoining Nadgee Nature Reserve in New South Wales, forms one of only twelve World Biosphere areas in Australia. It contains ecosystems, habitats and gene pools that are managed sustainably. The park encloses the Sandpatch Wilderness Area and is contiguous with the Cape Howe Wilderness Area, the Nadgee Nature Reserve and the Cape Howe Marine National Park.

=== Important Bird Area ===
The eastern section of the park lies within the Nadgee to Mallacoota Inlet Important Bird Area, so identified by BirdLife International because it supports populations of eastern bristlebirds and pilotbirds as well as other significant fauna.

== Visitor attractions ==
Croajingolong's landscapes are so spectacular and environmentally significant that the United Nations Educational, Scientific and Cultural Organization (UNESCO) nominated it a World Biosphere Reserve in 1977. The park houses impressive biodiversity, including almost 1,000 native plant species and 315 animal species.

The diverse coastal landscapes feature rocky outcrops, large stretches of sandy beaches, coastal dunes and freshwater rivers, making the park a popular destination for hiking and walking, swimming, diving, snorkelling and sea kayaking.

A popular way to explore the remote wilderness and diverse flora and fauna of the national park is on the Wilderness Coast Walk, which extends 45 kilometres from Thurra River camping area to Shipwreck Creek.

Popular destinations within the park include:

- Point Hicks and its lighthouse
- Tamboon Inlet resort town
- Spectacular sand dunes at Thurra River
- Lake Elusive near Wingan Inlet
- Mount Everard
- Rame Head

Camping spots exist at Wingan Inlet, Shipwreck Creek and Peachtree Creek and are all accessible by car. The camp sites at Mueller Inlet and Thurra River are privately managed. Most campgrounds are equipped with picnic facilities and fireplaces.

Nearby towns are Mallacoota, Genoa, Cann River, Bemm River and Orbost.

== See also ==
- Protected areas of Victoria
- List of biosphere reserves in Australia
