= Genoa, Victoria =

Genoa
- Town
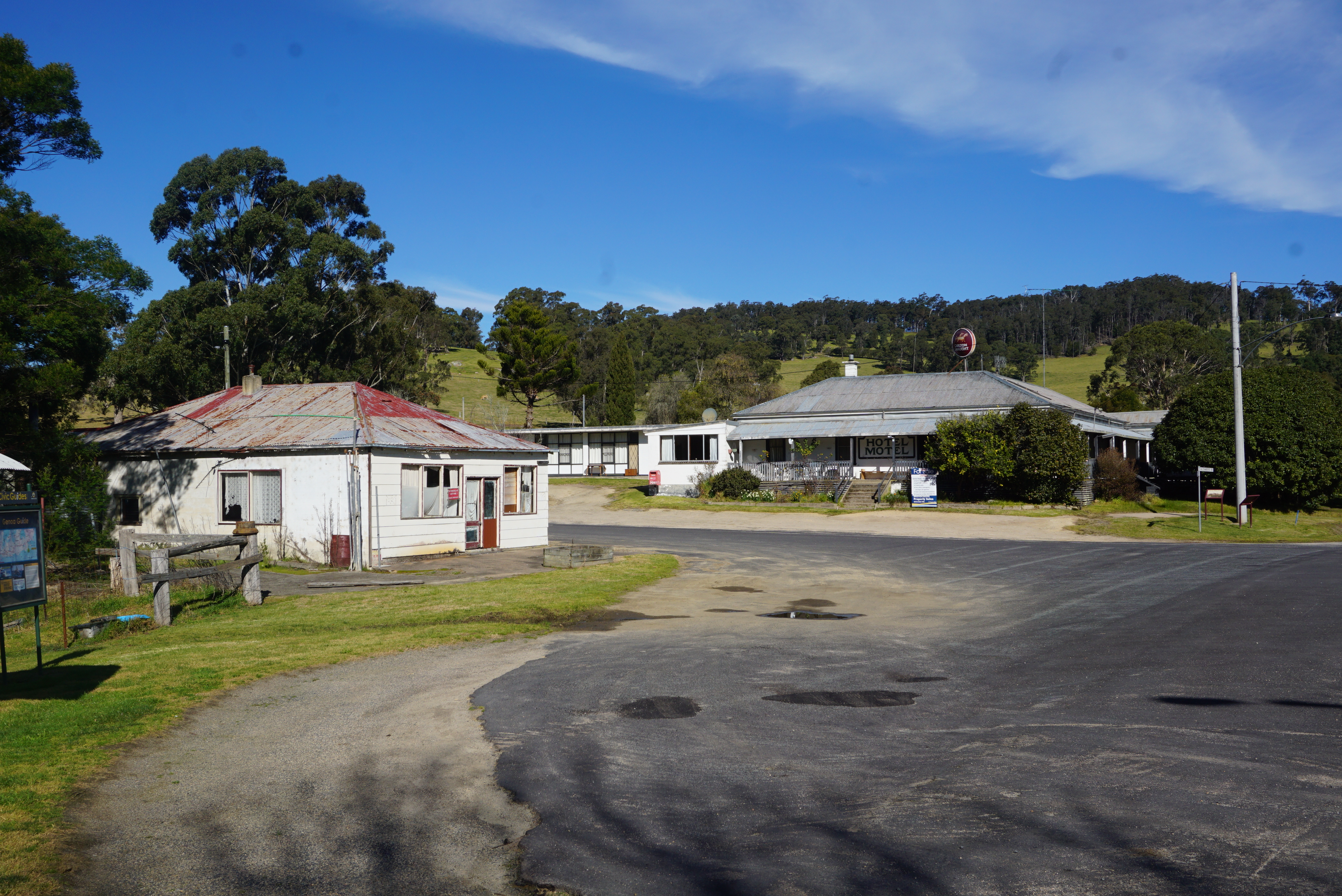

- Coordinates: 37°29′0″S 149°35′0″E
- Country: Australia
- State: Victoria
- LGA: Shire of East Gippsland
- Location: 498 km (309 mi) E of Melbourne; 336 km (209 mi) S of Canberra; 125 km (78 mi) E of Orbost; 50 km (31 mi) E of Cann River; 32 km (20 mi) NW of Mallacoota

Government
  - State electorate: Gippsland East
  - Federal division: Gippsland

Population
  - Total: 66 (2021 census)
- Postcode: 3891

Genoa is a town in Eastern Gippsland, Victoria, Australia. It is close to the New South Wales border where the Princes Highway crosses the Genoa River. The town is an important access point to the Croajingolong National Park. As of the 2021 census, Genoa had a population of 66. The Genoa Post Office opened on 9 April 1888.

In 1972, the earliest fossil trackway of primitive tetrapods were found in the Genoa River Gorge, dating back 350 million years.

In 2019, bush fires in Eastern Gippsland did "significant" damage to Genoa and the nearby town of Mallacoota.

== Genoa Peak ==
Genoa Peak is located in the Croajingolong National Park, and is 490 metres (1,610 ft) above sea level at the summit. The walk to the summit is 1.5 kilometres (0.93 mi) one way, and is rated for a moderate/steep fitness level. The view includes Mallacoota Lake which is over 40 kilometres (25 mi) away.
