= Little Dargo River =

Little Dargo
- Location of the Little Dargo River mouth in Victoria
- Etymology: Aboriginal (Dhudhuroa/Waywurru): to have patience, to wait

Location
- Country: Australia
- State: Victoria
- Region: Australian Alps (IBRA), South East Corner (IBRA), Victorian Alps
- LGA: Alpine Shire

Physical characteristics
- Source: Gow Plain, Great Dividing Range
  - location: west of Dinner Plain
  - coordinates: 37°15′10″S 147°15′58″E
  - elevation: 1,560 m (5,120 ft)
- Mouth: confluence with the Dargo River
  - location: south of Dargo
  - coordinates: 37°15′10″S 147°15′57″E
  - elevation: 160 m (520 ft)
- Length: 21 km (13 mi)

Basin features
- River system: Mitchell River catchment
- Tributaries
  - right: Jones Creek (Victoria)
- National park: Alpine NP

The Little Dargo River is a perennial river of the Mitchell River catchment, in the Alpine region of the Australian state of Victoria.

== Features and location ==
The Little Dargo River rises below the Gow Plain, part of the Great Dividing Range, southwest of Dinner Plain in the Alpine National Park. The river flows generally south by east, joined by one minor tributary before reaching its confluence with the Dargo River, within the Shepherd Creek Reference Area, in the Alpine Shire. The river descends 1,100 metres (3,600 ft) over its 21-kilometre (13 mi) course.

== Etymology ==
In the Aboriginal Dhudhuroa and Waywurru languages, the name dargo means "to have patience" or "to wait".

== See also ==
- Harrisons Cut gold diversion
- List of rivers in Australia
