= List of places on the Victorian Heritage Register in the Shire of Wellington =

This is a list of places on the Victorian Heritage Register in the Shire of Wellington in Victoria, Australia. The Victorian Heritage Register is maintained by the Heritage Council of Victoria.

The Victorian Heritage Register, as of 2021, lists the following thirty state-registered places within the Shire of Wellington:

Place name	Place #	Location	Suburb or Town	Co-ordinates	Built	State registered	Photo
Avon River Rail Bridge	H2389		Stratford	37.972056°S 147.080750°E	1888	20 December 2018	
Christ Church	H0999	Tyers St	Tarraville	38.635694°S 146.717139°E	1856	23 December 1993	
Court House	H1491	170 Commercial Rd	Yarram	38.561389°S 146.676000°E	1907	20 August 1982	
Criterion Hotel	H0215	90-94 Macalister St	Sale	38.109694°S 147.067861°E	1865	9 October 1974	
Former Cowwarr Butter Factory	H1282	2730 Traralgon-Maffra Rd	Cowwarr	38.014194°S 146.691306°E	1918	9 January 1997	
Former Turnbull Orr & Co Bond Store and Office	H1779	41-43 Wharf St	Port Albert	38.674833°S 146.696222°E	1844	18 February 1999	
Foster Building	H2308	67-71 Johnson St	Maffra	37.966528°S 146.974361°E	1908	13 September 2012	
Fulham Park	H0331	413 Myrtlebank-Fulham Rd	Fulham	38.086889°S 146.999111°E	1859	9 October 1974	
Gelliondale Briquette Plant	H1058	Coal Pit Rd; South Gippsland Hwy	Hedley	38.634139°S 146.565417°E	1929	24 November 1994	
Good Hope Quartz Gold Mining Precinct	H1268	Grant Historic Area, Good Hope Spur Track	Wongungarra	37.332083°S 147.102861°E	1865	19 December 1996	
Goodwood Sawmill Site	H2011	Mullungdung State Forest, South Gippsland Hwy	Darriman	38.438639°S 146.851917°E	1929	20 March 2003	
Grassdale	H0261	8 Grassdale Rd	Sale	38.081472°S 147.053528°E	1850	9 October 1974	
Harrison's Cut Gold Diversion Site	H1263	Upper Dargo Rd	Dargo	37.325444°S 147.295861°E	1880	19 December 1996	
Hawthorn Bank	H0256	165 Blands Rd	Yarram	38.594944°S 146.727639°E	1840	9 October 1974	
Hiawatha A Frame Bridge	H2069	Albert River Rd	Hiawatha	38.542278°S 146.481583°E	1933	9 September 2004	
Immigration Depot	H0498	6 Denison St	Port Albert	38.665056°S 146.691028°E	1857	26 June 1981	
Jungle Creek Gold Mining Diversion Sluice	H1258	Hibernia Rd	Cowa	37.394194°S 147.165083°E	1870	19 December 1996	
Mechanics Institute (and collection)	H0550	9-11 Avon St	Briagolong	37.843139°S 147.068500°E	1874	10 July 2008	
Morning Star Gold Battery Site	H1265	Morning Star Creek	Yangoura	37.743917°S 146.506389°E	1904	19 December 1996	
National Australia Bank	H0399	64 Johnson St	Maffra	37.965861°S 146.974889°E	1877	31 August 1977	
Port Albert Maritime Museum (former Bank of Victoria)	H1210	Parraville Rd	Port Albert	38.671417°S 146.693083°E	1861	24 October 1996	
Residence	H2272	Stawell St	Tarraville	38.635167°S 146.718306°E	1850	10 February 2011	
Rosedale Hotel	H0645	29-31 Lyons St	Rosedale	38.151972°S 146.790222°E	1858	17 December 1986	
Rosedale Railway Station Complex	H1589	26 Willung Rd	Rosedale	38.156528°S 146.787028°E	1881	20 August 1982	
Sale Court House	H1484	79-87 Foster St	Sale	38.111250°S 147.064972°E	1963	20 August 1982	
St Marks Anglican Church	H0599	55-61 Albert St	Rosedale	38.152500°S 146.781833°E	1866	21 August 1985	
Strathfieldsaye (Homestead)	H0262	324 Strathfieldsaye Rd	Perry Bridge	38.035694°S 147.284278°E	1854	9 October 1974	
Swing Bridge	H1438	Swing Bridge Drive	Sale	38.146417°S 147.086750°E	1880	27 July 1977	
Vallejo Gantner Hut	H0046	Mount Howitt Walking Track	Howitt Plains	37.172139°S 146.670167°E	1971	17 November 2005	
Woodcot Park	H0649	345 Tannery Rd	Tarraville	38.634972°S 146.705389°E	1855	11 March 1987	
