= Swamp Creek (Mitchell, East Gippsland, Victoria) =

Swamp
- Location of the Swamp Creek mouth in Victoria

Location
- Country: Australia
- State: Victoria
- Region: Australian Alps (IBRA), South East Corner (IBRA), Victorian Alps, East Gippsland
- Local government area: East Gippsland

Physical characteristics
- Source: Great Dividing Range
  - location: east of Dargo
  - coordinates: 37°28′8″S 147°19′36″E
  - elevation: 746 m (2,448 ft)
- Mouth: confluence with the Wentworth and Wonnangatta rivers to form the Mitchell River
  - location: Horseshoe Bend, north of Mitchell River National Park
  - coordinates: 37°34′41″S 147°22′8″E
  - elevation: 108 m (354 ft)
- Length: 17 km (11 mi)

Basin features
- River system: Mitchell River catchment

Swamp Creek is a perennial stream of the Mitchell River catchment, in the Alpine and East Gippsland regions of the Australian state of Victoria.

== Features and location ==
Swamp Creek rises below an unnamed peak, part of the Great Dividing Range, east of Dargo in a remote state forestry area. The creek flows generally south by southeast, before reaching its confluence with the Wentworth and Wonnangatta rivers to form the Mitchell River north of the Mitchell River National Park, in the Shire of East Gippsland. The creek descends 638 metres (2,093 ft) over its 17-kilometre (11 mi) course.

== See also ==
- List of rivers in Australia
