= Wentworth River (Victoria) =

River in Victoria, Australia

Wentworth
- Location of the Wentworth River mouth in Victoria
- Native name: Tally-yalmy, (Kurnai); Daberda'bara (Kurnai)

Location
- Country: Australia
- State: Victoria
- Region: South East Corner (IBRA), East Gippsland
- Local government area: Shire of East Gippsland

Physical characteristics
- Source: Great Dividing Range
  - location: east of Dargo
  - elevation: 977 m (3,205 ft)
- Mouth: confluence with the Wonnangatta River and Swamp Creek to form the Mitchell River
  - location: Horseshoe Bend, north of Mitchell River National Park
  - coordinates: 37°34′41″S 147°22′8″E
  - elevation: 137 m (449 ft)
- Length: 59 km (37 mi)

Basin features
- River system: Mitchell River catchment
- Tributaries
  - left: Wentworth River Baldhead Branch, Wild Horse Creek (Victoria), Pheasant Creek
  - right: Danes Creek, Teapot Creek

The Wentworth River is a perennial river of the Mitchell River catchment, in the East Gippsland region of the Australian state of Victoria.

== Features and location ==
The Wentworth River rises below Mount Birregun east of Dargo, part of the Great Dividing Range, about 20 kilometres (12 mi) southeast of Dinner Plain and a similar distance southwest of Omeo. The river flows generally southeast, then southwest, then south in a highly meandering course through a state forestry area, joined by four minor tributaries, before reaching its confluence with the Wonnangatta River and Swamp Creek to form the Mitchell River north of the Mitchell River National Park, in the Shire of East Gippsland. The river descends 866 metres (2,841 ft) over its 59-kilometre (37 mi) course.

== Etymology ==
In the Aboriginal Braiakaulung dialect of the Gunai language, there are two names for the Wentworth River; Tally-yalmy, meaning "shark" referring to an oral legend that a long time ago, "old man Blackfellow" caught a little shark at the mouth of the Wentworth River; and Daberda'bara, meaning "rocky bank".

== See also ==
- List of rivers in Australia
