= Dry River (Victoria) =

River in Victoria, Australia

Dry
- Location of the Dry River mouth in Victoria

Location
- Country: Australia
- State: Victoria
- Region: Australian Alps (IBRA), Victorian Alps
- Local government area: Wellington

Physical characteristics
- Source: Minogues Lookout, Great Dividing Range
  - location: Alpine National Park
  - coordinates: 37°15′50″S 146°41′51″E
  - elevation: 1,400 m (4,600 ft)
- Mouth: confluence with the Wonnangatta River
  - location: southwest of Mount Selwyn
  - coordinates: 37°11′10″S 146°48′28″E
  - elevation: 520 m (1,710 ft)
- Length: 14 km (8.7 mi)

Basin features
- River system: Mitchell River catchment
- National park: Alpine NP

The Dry River is a perennial river of the Mitchell River catchment, in the Alpine region of the Australian state of Victoria.

== Features and location ==
The Dry River rises below Minogues Lookout, part of the Great Dividing Range, approximately midway between Eildon and Omeo in the Alpine National Park. The river flows generally north by east, before reaching its confluence with the Wonnangatta River, southwest of Mount Selwyn, in the Shire of Wellington. The river descends 885 metres (2,904 ft) over its 14-kilometre (8.7 mi) course.

== See also ==
- List of rivers of Australia
