= The Nargun and the Stars (TV series) =

- Genre: Children's television
- Based on: The Nargun and the Stars by Patricia Wrightson
- Screenplay by: Margaret Kelly
- Directed by: John Walker
- Country of origin: Australia
- Original language: English
- No. of episodes: 5

Production
- Budget: AU $150,000

Original release
- Network: ABC Television

The Nargun and The Stars is a children's fantasy mini-series based on the award-winning novel of the same name written by Patricia Wrightson. The series contained five episodes, each of thirty minutes duration. The first episode was screened on 15 September 1981.

== Production ==
Patricia Wrightson's story was made into a mini-series for television in 1977–1978 by the Australian Broadcasting Corporation, the screenplay adapted by Margaret Kelly.

Produced by Lynn Bayonas, the series contained five episodes, each of thirty minutes duration. It took 45 days to film in the television studios in Sydney and Melbourne during the last three months of 1977 at a cost of about $150,000.

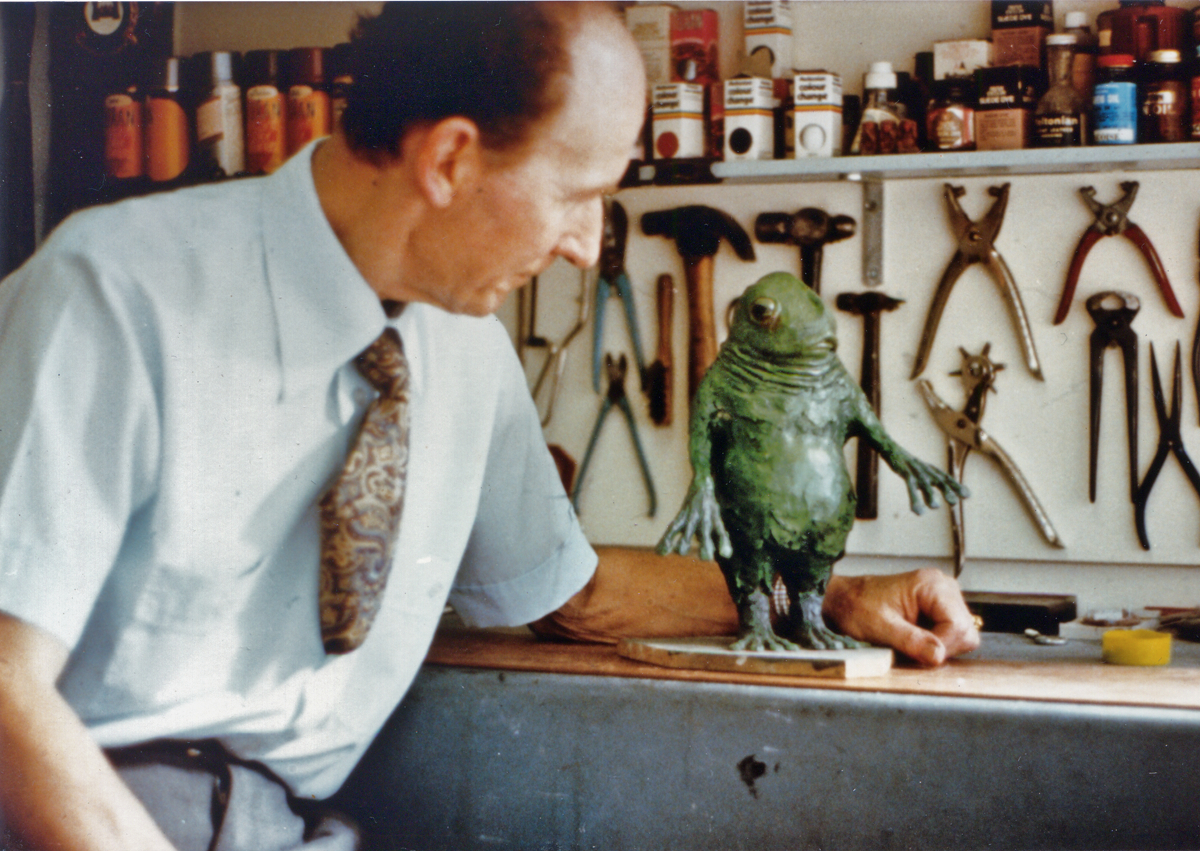
Artist Peter Kravchenko, the creator of the model for Potkoorok used in the series.

Regarded as a top-rating children's television program with prospects of sales internationally, its screening was delayed for almost two years because of a union dispute over the use of new technology and demand for higher pay by ABC technicians. Although production was completed in January, 1978 — the tapes were not edited because the union had imposed black bans on the installation of new editing equipment. According to an ABC spokesman at the time, Graham Reynolds "The sad part is that if the series could have been screened when it was scheduled, it could have cashed in on the box-office appeal of such films as Star Wars and Close Encounters of the Third Kind."

The first episode was eventually screened on 15 September 1981.

== Plot ==
The story is set in Australia, and draws on Australian Aboriginal mythology, and includes themes of conservation. It involves an orphaned city boy, Simon Brent, who comes to live on a 5000-acre sheep station called Wongadilla, in the Hunter Region, with his mother's second cousins, the affable Edie and Charlie.

Simon initially shows little sensitivity to the natural environment. In a remote valley on the property he discovers a variety of ancient Australian Aboriginal Dreamtime creatures. The arrival of heavy machinery intent on clearing the natural vegetation, the building of a road, and Simon's own vandalistic actions on the natural environment brings to life the ominous ancient stone creature — the Nargun which has the ability to move. Other mythical creatures encountered in the story include the mischievous green swamp-dwelling water-spirit Potkoorok, the Turongs (tree people) and the Nyols (cave people).

== Cast ==
- Rodney Bell as Simon Brent
- Marianne Howard as Potkoorok
- Noel Brophy as the voice of Potkoorok
- Peter Gwynne as Cousin Charlie
- Melissa Jaffer as Cousin Edie
- Roberta Grant as Liz
- Noel Trevarthen as Andrew

== Episodes ==
1. Simon
2. The Potkoorok
3. The Turongs
4. The Nyols
5. The Nargun

== Broadcast ==
- Australia: (ABC) (1981, 1987—1989)
- Canada: (Knowledge Network) (1987—1991), (TVO) (1990—1992)
- Republic of Ireland: (RTÉ One) (1983)
- United Kingdom: (The Children's Channel) (1984—1985)
