= Dargo River =

Dargo
- Location of the Dargo River mouth in Victoria
- Etymology: Aboriginal (Dhudhuroa/Waywurru): to have patience, to wait

Location
- Country: Australia
- State: Victoria
- Region: Australian Alps (IBRA), South East Corner (IBRA), Victorian Alps, East Gippsland
- Local government areas: Wellington, East Gippsland
- Town: Dargo

Physical characteristics
- Source: Mount Higginbotham, Great Dividing Range
  - location: west of Dinner Plain
  - coordinates: 37°15′10″S 147°15′58″E
  - elevation: 1,260 m (4,130 ft)
- Mouth: confluence with the Wonnangatta River
  - location: south of Dargo
  - coordinates: 37°31′34″S 147°16′4″E
  - elevation: 160 m (520 ft)
- Length: 108 km (67 mi)

Basin features
- River system: Mitchell River catchment
- Tributaries
  - left: Budwuid Creek
  - right: Shepherds Creek, Little Dargo River, Eighteen Mile Creek (Victoria), Two Mile Creek
- National park: Alpine NP

The Dargo River is a perennial river of the Mitchell River catchment, in the Alpine and East Gippsland regions of the Australian state of Victoria.

== Features and location ==
The Dargo River rises below Mount Higginbotham, part of the Great Dividing Range, west of Dinner Plain and south of the Great Alpine Road in the Alpine National Park. The river flows generally south by east, then west, then generally south in a highly meandering course, joined by five tributaries including the Little Dargo River, before reaching its confluence with the Wonnangatta River, south of Dargo and north of the Mitchell River National Park, in the Shire of East Gippsland. The river descends 1,100 metres (3,600 ft) over its 108-kilometre (67 mi) course.

== Etymology ==
In the Aboriginal Dhudhuroa and Waywurru languages, the name dargo means "to have patience" or "to wait".

== See also ==
- Harrisons Cut gold diversion
- List of rivers in Australia
