= Melissa Jaffer =

Australian actress (born 1936)

- Born: 1 December 1936 (age 89); Gladstone, South Australia, Australia
- Occupation: Actress
- Years active: 1955-present

Melissa Jaffer (born 1 December 1936) is an Australian actress. She is best known for her stage and television roles, but has also appeared in many films.

== Career ==
Jaffer started her career in theatre productions in the mid 1950s, and has made many appearances in television series, including Kings, Mother and Son, G. P., Brides of Christ, Grass Roots and All Saints. Jaffer is probably best known to international audiences for her role as ageing mystic Utu-Noranti Pralatong in the science fiction series Farscape. In 1976, Jaffer tied for the first AACTA Award for Best Actress in a Supporting Role opposite Jacki Weaver for her performance in Caddie. In 1980 she played the part of Cousin Edie in the Australian Broadcasting Corporation's children's television series The Nargun and the Stars.

In the 2015 film Mad Max: Fury Road she played the role of "Keeper of the Seeds".

== Filmography ==
=== Film ===
Year	Title	Role	Type
1970	3 to Go	Lady on phone (uncredited)	Short film (Segment: “Toula”)
1973	Gretel		Short film
1974	Between Wars	Matron	Feature film
1974	The Cars That Ate Paris	Beth	Feature film
1975	Ride a Wild Pony	Mrs. Pirie	Feature film
1976	Caddie	Leslie	Feature film
1978	Weekend of Shadows	Vi	Feature film
1982	Starstruck	Mrs. Booth	Feature film
1983	Molly	Aunt Jenny	Feature film
1983	Kindred	Shirley	Film short
1984	The Coolangatta Gold	Ballet Teacher	Feature film
1989	The Delinquents	Aunt Westbury	Feature film
1992	El Besodel Sueno	Role unknown	Feature film
1993	You and Me and Uncle Bob	Sylvie	Feature film
1999	Sally Marshall Is Not an Alien	Granny Marshall	Feature film
1999	Komodo	Patrick's Grandmother	Feature film
2000	My Mother Frank	Sister Sebastian	Feature film
2000	Cheek to Cheek	Beryl	Short film
2012	Dear Life	Barbara Larkin	Short film
2015	Mad Max: Fury Road	Keeper of the Seeds	Feature film
2019	Strangers	Lillian	Short film
2022	Three Thousand Years of Longing	Clementine	Feature film

=== Television ===
Year	Title	Role	Type
1956	Barry Humphries Revues		TV series
1959	Trip-Tease and High C's	Herself	TV special
1960	You, Too, Can Have a Body		Teleplay
1961	Consider Your Verdict		TV series, 1 episode
1967	Bellbird		TV series, 1 episode
1968; 1969	Homicide	Lorna Stacy	TV series, 2 episodes
1970	A Summer Storm		Teleplay
1970	Beauty and the Beast	Panellist	TV series
1973	How Could You Believe Me When I Said I'd Be Your Valet When You Know I've Been a Liar All My Life?		Teleplay
1973	The Taming of the Shrew	Widow	Teleplay
1973	Division 4	June Ross	TV series, 1 episode
1974	Matlock Police	Linda Davis	TV series, 1 episode
1974	Out of Love		TV series, episode 2: "I Don't Want To Know"
1974	Silent Number	Thelma	TV series, 1 episode
1974	Essington		TV film
1975	Behind the Legend		TV series, episode 10: "Christopher Brennan"
1975	The Seven Ages of Man		TV series, episode 2: "The Schoolboy"
1975	Certain Women		TV series
1975	Ben Hall	Mrs. Daley	TV series, 3 episodes
1975	Games for Parents and Other Children		Teleplay
1975	The Tichborne Affair		TV film
1976	The Outsiders	Betty Kurts	TV series, 1 episode
1976	Stories from Around the World	Mrs. Hoddel	TV series, 1 episode
1976	Do I Have to Kill My Child?	Mrs. Hammond	TV film
1979	The Wonderful World of Disney	Angus' Wife	TV series, 2 episodes
1980	The Nargun and the Stars	Cousin Edie	TV miniseries, 4 episodes
1981	Cop Shop		TV series
1983	Learned Friends		TV series
1983-84	Kings	Rosie King	TV series, 19 episodes
1984	Five Mile Creek	Mrs. O'Bannion	TV series, 1 episode
1984	Singles	Gloria	TV series, 5 episodes
1984; 1986; 1991	A Country Practice	Barbara Kennedy	TV series, 2 episodes
1985; 1994	Mother And Son	Lorna	TV series, 1 episode
1986	Shout! The Story of Johnny O'Keefe	Thelma O'Keefe	TV miniseries, 3 episodes
1986; 1991	A Country Practice	Agatha Muldoon	TV series, 2 episodes
1986	Land of Hope	Old Nesta Quinn	TV miniseries
1986	Studio 86		TV series, episode 5: "What We Did In The Past"
1987	The Harp in the South	Miss Sheily	TV miniseries, 3 episodes
1987	The Butcher's Son		TV film
1987	Poor Man's Orange	Miss Sheily	TV miniseries, 3 episodes
1987	Willing and Abel		TV series, 1 episode
1988	Swap Shop	Aunt Mimi	TV series
1989	E Street	Queenie	TV series, 4 episodes
1990; 1996	G.P.		TV series, 1 episode
1991	A Country Practice	Anthea Garrick	TV series, 2 episodes
1991	Brides of Christ	Sister Attracta	TV miniseries, 1 episode
1991	Good Vibrations	,Annie	TV miniseries, 2 episodes
1992	The Distant Home	Mrs. Webster	TV film
1994	Mother And Son	Lorna	TV series, 2 episodes
1994	Heartland	Meredith Lovell	TV series, 1 episode
1995	On the Dead Side		TV film
1995	Police Rescue	Gwen	TV series, 1 episode
1995	The New Adventures of Flipper	Shopkeeper	TV series, 1 episode
1996	Monday to Friday	Guest	TV series, 1 episode
1996	G.P.	Dr. Maureen Riordan	TV series, 18 episodes
1997	Big Sky	Lily Bateman	TV series, 1 episode
1997	Fallen Angels	Marion	TV series, 1 episode
1999-2000	All Saints	Eileen Sullivan	TV series, 8 episodes
2000	Grass Roots	Fran Smith	TV series, 8 episodes
2000-03	Farscape	Utu-Noranti Pralatong / Dominar Rygel XVI / Female Pilot / Nilaam	TV series, 24 episodes
2000	The Lost World	Crazy Old Woman	TV series, 1 episode
2001	People Who Still Use Milk Bottles	Narrator	Film documentary
2001	The Farm	Helen Cooper	TV miniseries, 3 episodes
2001	Head Start	Amanda Villiers	TV series, 9 episodes
2003	BlackJack	Helen Kirsten	TV film series, 1 episode: "Murder Archive"
2003	Snobs	Gwen Walston	TV series, 16 episodes
2004	Farscape: The Peacekeeper Wars	Utu-Noranti Pralatong	TV miniseries, 2 episodes
2012	Packed To The Rafters	Mrs. Montague	TV series, 1 episode
2017	Glitch	Adeline Fitzgerald	TV series, 2 episodes
2018	True Story with Hamish & Andy	Mrs. Rose	TV series, 1 episode
2021	The Newsreader	Ruth	TV series, 1 episode
2024	High Country	Liz Whitford	TV series, 5 episodes
