= Humffray River =

Humffray Rileys Creek, Humphrey River
- Location of the Humffray River mouth in Victoria

Location
- Country: Australia
- State: Victoria
- Region: Australian Alps (IBRA), Victorian Alps
- Local government area: Alpine Shire

Physical characteristics
- Source confluence: Humffray River West Branch and Humffray River East Branch
  - location: Tea Tree Range, Great Dividing Range
  - coordinates: 37°9′18″S 146°53′26″E
  - elevation: 564 m (1,850 ft)
- Mouth: confluence with the Wonnangatta River
  - location: Alpine National Park
  - coordinates: 37°14′30″S 146°54′36″E
  - elevation: 431 m (1,414 ft)
- Length: 14 km (8.7 mi)

Basin features
- River system: Mitchell River catchment
- Tributaries
  - right: Riley Creek
- National park: Alpine NP

The Humffray River is a perennial river of the Mitchell River catchment, in the Alpine region of the Australian state of Victoria.

== Location and features ==
Formed by the confluence of the Humffray River West Branch and Humffray River East Branch, the Humffray River rises below the Tea Tree Range within the Great Dividing Range, northeast of the Wonnangatta River Reference Area and flows generally south by east, joined by one minor tributary before reaching its confluence with the Wonnangatta River in remote country below Little Baldy within the Alpine National Park in the Alpine Shire. The river descends 133 metres (436 ft) over its 14-kilometre (8.7 mi) course.

== See also ==
- List of rivers in Australia
