= Selwyn Range =

Selwyn Range can refer to:

- Selwyn Range (Australia), rugged highlands in Queensland
- Selwyn Range (Canada), a mountain range in British Columbia
- Selwyn Range or Selwyn Mountains, in Yukon and the Northwest Territories, Canada

== See also ==
- Mount Selwyn (mountain), Victoria, Australia
