= Eighteen Mile Creek =

Eighteen Mile Creek is the name of several small rivers.

In Australia

- Eighteen Mile Creek (Queensland), a small watercourse in Queensland.
- Eighteen Mile Creek (Victoria), a tributary of the Dargo River in Victoria.

In the United States

- Eighteen Mile Creek (Niagara County), a small river in Niagara County, New York.
- Eighteen Mile Creek (Erie County), a small river in Erie County, New York.
- Eighteen Mile Creek (Idaho), a small river in Caribou County, Idaho.
- Eighteen Mile Creek (South Carolina), a small river in South Carolina.
- Eighteen Mile Creek (West Virginia), a small river in Mason and Putnam Counties, West Virginia.
- Eighteen Mile Creek (Wisconsin), within the Chequamegon-Nicolet National Forest, Bayfield County, Wisconsin.
