= Crooked River (Victoria) =

River in Victoria, Australia

Crooked
- Location of the Crooked River mouth in Victoria
- Native name: Dow-wirra (Kurnai); Nirlung (Kurnai)

Location
- Country: Australia
- State: Victoria
- Region: Australian Alps (IBRA), Victorian Alps
- Local government area: Shire of Wellington

Physical characteristics
- Source confluence: Twenty Five Mile Creek and Thirty Mile Creek
  - location: south of Dinner Plain, Great Dividing Range
  - coordinates: 37°15′1″S 148°8′22″E
  - elevation: 653 m (2,142 ft)
- Mouth: confluence with the Wongungarra River
  - location: Alpine National Park
  - coordinates: 37°21′28″S 147°4′36″E
  - elevation: 287 m (942 ft)
- Length: 26 km (16 mi)

Basin features
- River system: Mitchell River catchment
- Tributaries
  - left: Good Luck Creek
  - right: Brewery Creek (Victoria)
- National park: Alpine NP

The Crooked River is a perennial river of the Mitchell River catchment, in the Alpine region of the Australian state of Victoria.

== Location and features ==
Formed by the confluence of the Twenty Five Mile Creek and Thirty Mile Creek, the Crooked River rises below The Tablelands, the fourth highest mountain pass in Victoria, within the Great Dividing Range, south of Dinner Plain. The river flows in a highly meandering course, generally south by west, joined by two minor tributaries before reaching its confluence with the Wongungarra River between the small settlements of Howittville and Winchester, within the Alpine National Park in the Shire of Wellington. The river descends 366 metres (1,201 ft) over its 26-kilometre (16 mi) course.

== Etymology ==
In the Australian Aboriginal Brabralung dialect of the Gunai language, two variant names for the Crooked River are given as Dow-wirra, meaning "dry tree"; and Nirlung, meaning "plenty of water-hens".

== See also ==
- List of rivers in Australia
