= Wongungarra River =

River in Victoria, Australia

Wongungarra
- Location of the Wongungarra River mouth in Victoria
- Native name: Gwannam-o-rook (Kurnai)

Location
- Country: Australia
- State: Victoria
- Region: Australian Alps (IBRA), Victorian Alps
- LGA: Alpine Shire

Physical characteristics
- Source: Mount Saint Bernard, Great Dividing Range
  - location: west of Dinner Plain
  - coordinates: 37°0′54″S 147°4′51″E
  - elevation: 1,430 m (4,690 ft)
- Mouth: confluence with the Wonnangatta River
  - location: Alpine National Park
  - coordinates: 37°23′42″S 147°6′18″E
  - elevation: 236 m (774 ft)
- Length: 66 km (41 mi)

Basin features
- River system: Mitchell River catchment
- Tributaries
  - left: Blue Rag Creek, Crooked River, Jungle Creek
  - right: Mount Selwyn Creek, Big Running Creek, Little Running Creek
- National park: Alpine NP

The Wongungarra River is a perennial river of the Mitchell River catchment, in the Alpine region of the Australian state of Victoria.

== Location and features ==
The Wongungarra River rises below Mount Saint Bernard within the Great Dividing Range, west of Dinner Plain and south of both the Great Alpine Road and Mount Hotham. The river flows generally south by east, joined by six tributaries including the Crooked River before reaching its confluence with the Wonnangatta River near the small settlement of Crooked River south of the Alpine National Park in the Alpine Shire. The river descends 1,190 metres (3,900 ft) over its 66-kilometre (41 mi) course.

== Etymology ==
In the Australian Aboriginal Brabralung/Daungwurrung dialect of the Gunai language, the name for the Wongungarra River is Gwannam-o-rook, meaning "eaglehawk".

== See also ==
- List of rivers in Australia
