= Wonnangatta River =

River in Victoria, Australia

Wonnangatta
- Location of the Wonnangatta River mouth in Victoria
- Native name: Wontwun, WonnangaUa (Kurnai)

Location
- Country: Australia
- State: Victoria
- Region: Australian Alps (IBRA), South East Corner (IBRA), Victorian Alps, East Gippsland
- LGAs: Mansfield, Wellington, East Gippsland

Physical characteristics
- Source: Mount Despair, Great Dividing Range
  - location: east of Mansfield
  - coordinates: 37°8′14″S 146°45′48″E
  - elevation: 1,220 m (4,000 ft)
- Mouth: confluence with the Wentworth River and Swamp Creek to form the Mitchell River
  - location: Horseshoe Bend, north of Mitchell River National Park
  - coordinates: 37°34′41″S 147°22′8″E
  - elevation: 137 m (449 ft)
- Length: 151 km (94 mi)

Basin features
- River system: Mitchell River catchment
- Tributaries
  - left: Humffray River, Black Snake Creek, Wongungarra River, Dargo River
  - right: Dry River, Conglomerate Creek, Moroka River, Scrubby Creek, Wombat Creek, Castleburn Creek, Bulgaback Creek
- National park: Alpine NP

The Wonnangatta River is a perennial river of the Mitchell River catchment, in the Alpine and East Gippsland regions of the Australian state of Victoria.

== Features and location ==
The Wonnangatta River rises below Mount Despair, part of the Great Dividing Range, east of Mansfield in a remote state forestry protected area, called the Wonnangatta River Reference Area. The river flows generally south by east, in a highly meandering course, joined by eleven tributaries including the Dry, Humffray, Moroka, Wongungarra and Dargo rivers, before reaching its confluence with the Wentworth River and Swamp Creek to form the Mitchell River north of the Mitchell River National Park, in the Shire of East Gippsland. The river descends 1,110 metres (3,640 ft) over its 151-kilometre (94 mi) course.

At the locality of Riverford, the Dargo Road traverses the river.

== Etymology ==
In the Aboriginal Braiakaulung dialect of the Gunai language, there are two variant names for the Wonnangatta River; Wontwun; and WonnangaUa. Their meanings are not clearly defined.

== See also ==
- County of Wonnangatta
- List of rivers in Australia
- Wonnangatta Station
