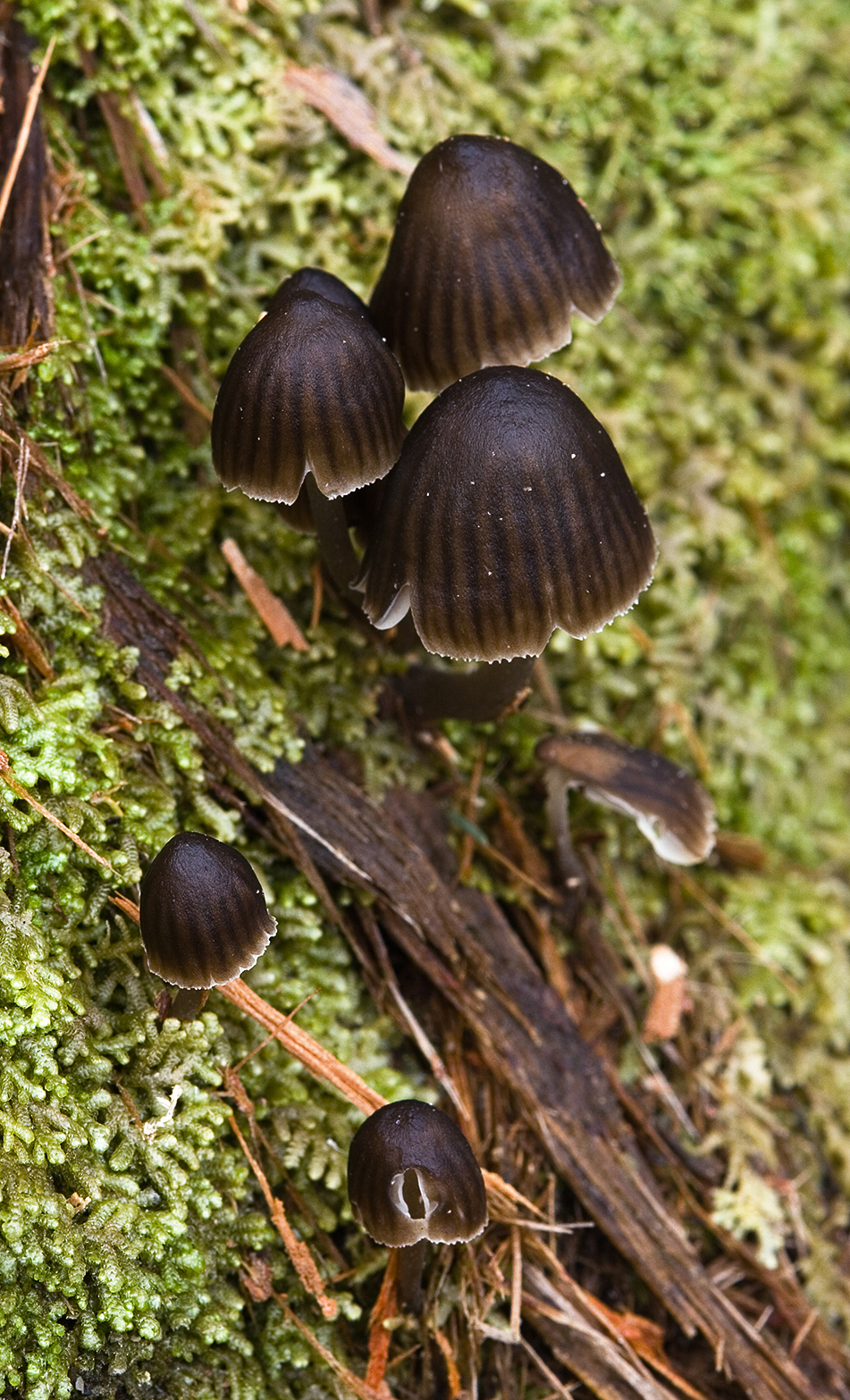

Scientific classification
- Kingdom: Fungi
- Division: Basidiomycota
- Class: Agaricomycetes
- Order: Agaricales
- Family: Mycenaceae
- Genus: Mycena
- Species: M. nargan

Binomial name
- Mycena nargan Grgur. (1995)

= Mycena nargan =

Species of fungus

Mycena nargan
- Mycological characteristics
- Gills on hymenium
- Cap is conical
- Hymenium is adnate
- Stipe is bare
- Spore print is white to cream
- Ecology is saprotrophic
- Edibility is unknown

Mycena nargan, commonly known as the Nargan's bonnet, is a species of fungus in the family Mycenaceae, and the sole member of the section Nargan in the genus Mycena. Reported as a new species in 1995, it is known predominantly from Southern Australia. The saprobic fungus produces mushrooms that grow on well-decayed wood, often on the underside of wood lying in litter. The dark chestnut-coloured caps are covered with white, easily removed scales, and reach diameters of up to 2 cm (0.8 in) wide. The pale, slender stems are up to 5 cm (2.0 in) long and have white scales at the base. On the underside of the cap, the cream-coloured gills are widely spaced and bluntly attached to the stem. The edibility of the mushroom is unknown.

== Taxonomy, naming, and classification ==
The species was first discovered in 1992 in Kuitpo Forest, South Australia, and reported as new to science in a 1995 Australian Systematic Botany publication. The species name refers to the nargan or nargun, a mythical aboriginal being – originally the mycologists Tom May and Bruce Fuhrer had called it "nargan", as its white speckles glistened in the dark like the eyes of the nargan, and Cheryl Grgurinovic incorporated this into its specific epithet. It is commonly known as "Nargan's bonnet", but has also been referred to as the "spotted pixie cap".

With respect to infrageneric classification (i.e., taxonomic ranking below the level of genus) in Mycena, several characteristics suggest the mushroom fits best in Rudolph Arnold Maas Geesteranus' section Fragilipedes: the ellipsoidal, amyloid spores; dextrinoid spore-bearing tissue; smooth cheilocystidia; gills with the edge the same colour as the face; and the non-slimy, distinctly coloured cap. According to the 1986 infrageneric classification proposed by Rolf Singer, the mushroom would be classified in subgenus Mycena, subsection Ciliatae, stirps Alcalina (roughly equivalent to section Fragilipedes of Maas Geesteranus) because of the amyloid spores, smooth, elongated cheilocystidia, dull-coloured pigment, and stem without either latex or a slimy sheath. Grgurinovic erected the new section Nargan to accommodate M. nargan, because its scales, lack of coarse fibrils at the base of the stem, and lack of pruinose coating meant it was not a good fit for section Fragilipedes.

== Description ==
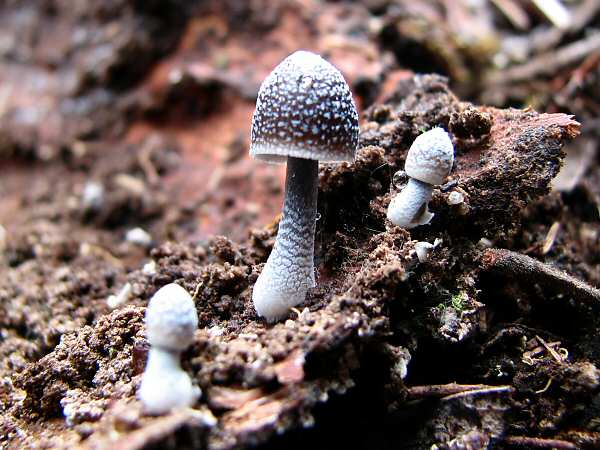
Young specimens have white scales covering the cap and base of the stem.

The caps of young mushrooms are initially egg-shaped to conical, expanding to become bell-shaped and up to 2 cm (0.8 in) in diameter. Initially, the margin of the cap is rolled inwards; it typically assumes a lighter color than the centre of the cap surface. Dark brown in color, the mushroom is distinguished by the presence of white speckles or scales on the cap and stem; these scales may disappear when they become sloughed off or washed away by rain, which can make the species hard to recognise. The thick gills have an adnate attachment to the stem (broadly attached to the stem slightly above the bottom of the gill, with most of the gill fused to the stem), and are white to light grey in colour, paler toward the edge. There are about 24–28 gills extending completely from the cap margin to the stem, and one or two tiers of lamellulae (shorter gills does do not extend fully from the margin to the stem). The thin stem is up to 4 cm (1.6 in) high and 0.3 cm (0.12 in) wide, and does not have a ring. Young specimens will typically have whitish scales at the base; later, these will slough off and a felt-like whitish mycelium may be apparent. The mushroom have no distinctive odour. The spore print is white or cream. The edibility of the mushroom has not been reported.

=== Microscopic characteristics ===
The spores of M. nargan are roughly ellipsoid, smooth, hyaline, and measure 7.4–10.4 by 4.8–7.1 μm. They have a small, oblique apiculus, and lack oil droplets. In terms of staining reactions, they are acyanophilous (not absorbing methyl blue dye), and amyloid (turning blue-black in Melzer's reagent). The basidia (spore-bearing cells in the hymenium) are club-shaped, have clamp connections at their bases, and measure 29.6–36.4 by 8.2–10.7 μm. They are four-spored, and the spores are attached to the basidia by long slender sterigmata that are up to 7.2 μm long. The gill edge is sterile (without basidia), and has abundant cystidia. These thin-walled cheilocystidia range in shape from swollen in the middle with a beak-like point, to spindle-shaped (fusiform) to club-shaped. They are smooth, hyaline, and inamyloid, with dimensions of 20.8–38.4 by 4.8–10.4 μm. They have a clamp connection at base. Pleurocystidia (cystidia on the gill face) are not present in this species. The gill tissue is made of smooth, thin-walled cylindrical to egg-shaped cells, up to 30.4 μm in diameter. The cells are dextrinoid (producing a black to blue-black positive reaction with Melzer's reagent), and reddish brown. The surface of the cap (the pileipellis) is made of a layer of bent-over filamentous hyphae measuring 1.8–4.8 μm. These loosely arranged hyphae are slightly gelatinised, smooth, thin-walled, hyaline, inamyloid, and have clamp connections. The tissue layer directly under the pileipellis (the hypodermium) has cells containing brown pigment. The cap tissue consists of smooth, thin-walled, cylindrical to broadly cylindrical or ovoid cells, up to 37.0 μm in diameter, with clamp connections. These cells are dextrinoid and reddish orange-brown in colour. The surface of the stem is made of filamentous hyphae, 2.2–4.0 μm in diameter, either smooth or with sparse to moderately dense short, rod-like to cylindrical projections. The cells are thin-walled to very slightly thick-walled, hyaline, inamyloid, and have clamp connections. Caulocystidia (cystidia on the cap surface) are not present. The stem tissue consists of short, cylindrical cells, up to 28.0 μm in diameter that are smooth, thin-walled, and with or without brown pigment in the cytoplasm. The cells contain clamp connections and are reddish orange-brown.

=== Similar species ===
Mycena nargan has a very distinct appearance, and is unlikely to be mistaken for other Mycenas. However, one noted unintentional misidentification occurred when the M. nargan on the cover photograph of Bruce A. Fuhrer's 2005 book A Field Guide to Australian Fungi was labelled as Mycena nivalis, a species with a white cap.

== Habitat and distribution ==
A common mushroom, Mycena nargan is found growing singly or in clusters on the underside of rotting wood in wet and shaded areas, and is especially partial to Eucalyptus and Pinus pinaster. Fruit bodies usually appear from April to June. The species has been recorded from Tasmania, Victoria and southeastern South Australia. The Australian Fungimap initiative has reported isolated collections in Western Australia, South Australia, and New South Wales, although the majority of sightings have been in Tasmania and Victoria. The fungus is saprobic, meaning it derives nutrients from dead or dying organic matter. A field study conducted in Tasmania showed that it is much more likely to be found in mature eucalypt forest (defined as having grown at least 70 years before the last wildfire) than young, regenerating forest that had experienced clearfelling, burning, and sowing two to three years previously.
