= Quality of Mercy (TV series) =

- Genre: Anthology series
- Country of origin: Australia
- Original language: English
- No. of episodes: 7

Production
- Producer: Patrick Barton
- Production company: Australian Broadcasting Commission

Original release
- Network: ABC TV
- Release: 4 June – 16 July 1975

Related
- The Seven Ages of Man

Quality of Mercy is a 1975 Australian TV series, which took the format of an anthology of television plays. All the scripts were by female writers. The series was commissioned by John Croyston, the head of ABC TV Drama, and was produced in Melbourne and Sydney. It was followed later in 1975 by a companion series, The Seven Ages of Man.

== Cast ==
- Belinda Giblin (episode 5: "Papa")
- Ben Gabriel (episode 2: "The Love Job")
- Benita Collings (episode 7: "Twice Blessed")
- Cecily Polson (episode 7: "Twice Blessed")
- Chris Haywood as Kurt (episode 3: "Send Him on His Way Rejoicing")
- Elspeth Ballantyne (episode 2: "The Love Job")
- Enid Lorimer (episode 2: "The Love Job")
- Gerda Nicolson (episode 6: "We Should Have Had a Uniform")
- Ian Smith (episode 4: "Kenny")
- Jacqui Gordon as Sally (episode 1: "Sally Go Round the Moon")
- John Frawley (episode 6: "We Should Have Had a Uniform")
- John Waters (episode 5: "Papa")
- Kit Taylor as Tom (episode 1: "Sally Go Round the Moon")
- Olivia Hamnett as Helen (episode 1: "Sally Go Round the Moon")
- Rod Mullinar (episode 3: "Send Him on His Way Rejoicing")
- Sandy Gore as Sandy (episode 3: "Send Him On His Way Rejoicing")

== Episodes ==
No.	Title	Directed by	Written by	Original release date
1	"Papa"	Douglas Sharp	Lynn Bayonas	4 June 1975
2	"Sally Go Round the Moon"	John Gauci	Judith Colquhoun	11 June 1975
3	"The Love Job"	Keith Wilkes	Margaret Kelly	18 June 1975
4	"Send Him On His Way Rejoicing"	David Zweck	Anne Brooksbank	25 June 1975
5	"Kenny"	Douglas Sharp	Sonia Borg	2 July 1975
6	"We Should Have Had a Uniform"	John Gauci	Oriel Gray	9 July 1975
7	"Twice Blessed"	Michael Ludbrook	Barbara Vernon	16 July 1975
