= Nargun =

Mythical creature

A Nargun, according to Gunai/Kurnai tribal legends, was a fierce half-human half-stone creature that lived in the Den of Nargun, a cave under a rock overhang behind a small waterfall located in the Mitchell River National Park, Victoria, Australia. Aboriginal legend describes the Nargun as a beast entirely made of stone except for its hands, arms and breast. The fierce creature would drag unwary travellers into its den. Any weapon directed against it would be turned back on its owner.

== The Den of Nargun ==
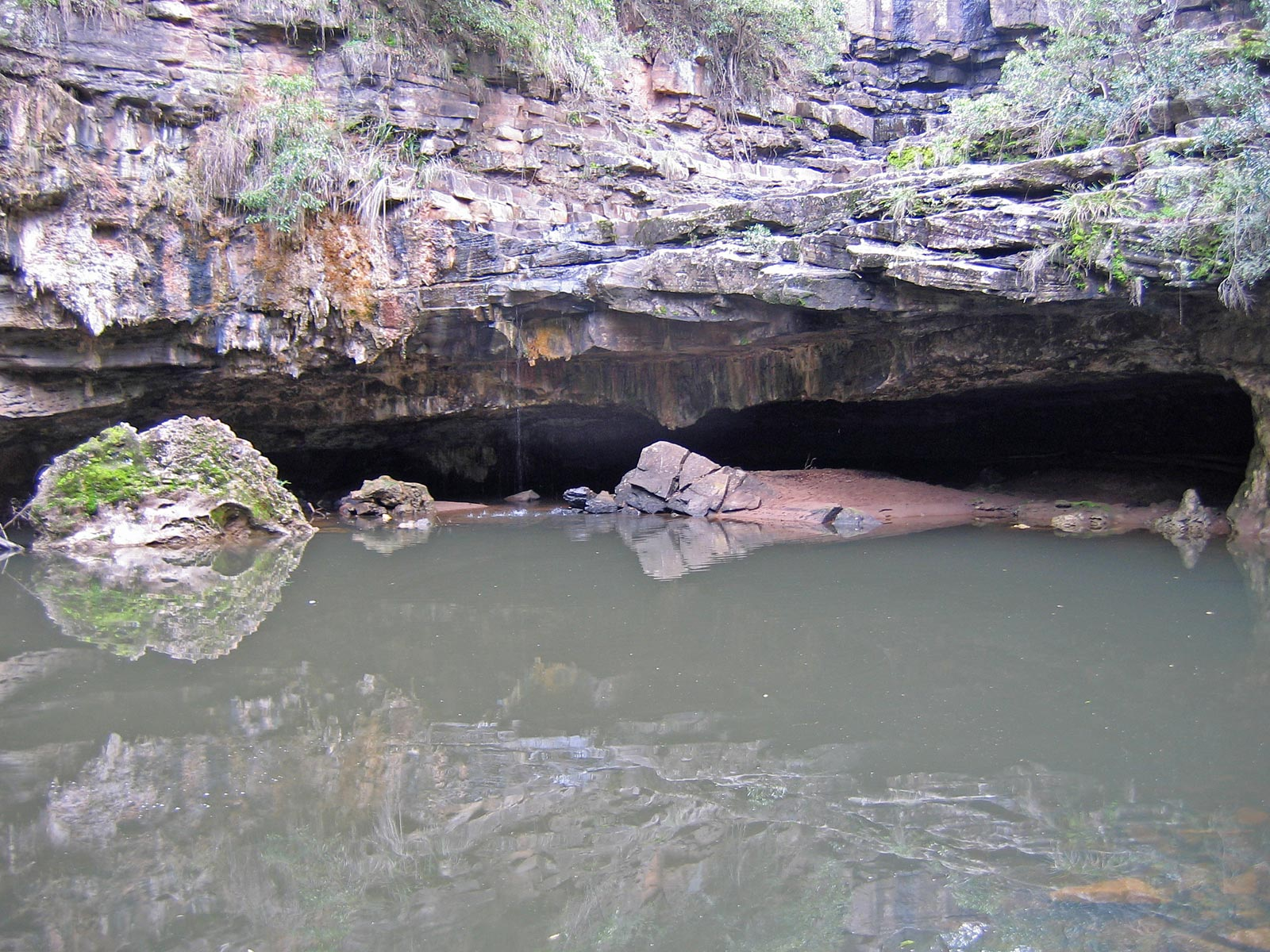
The Den of Nargun

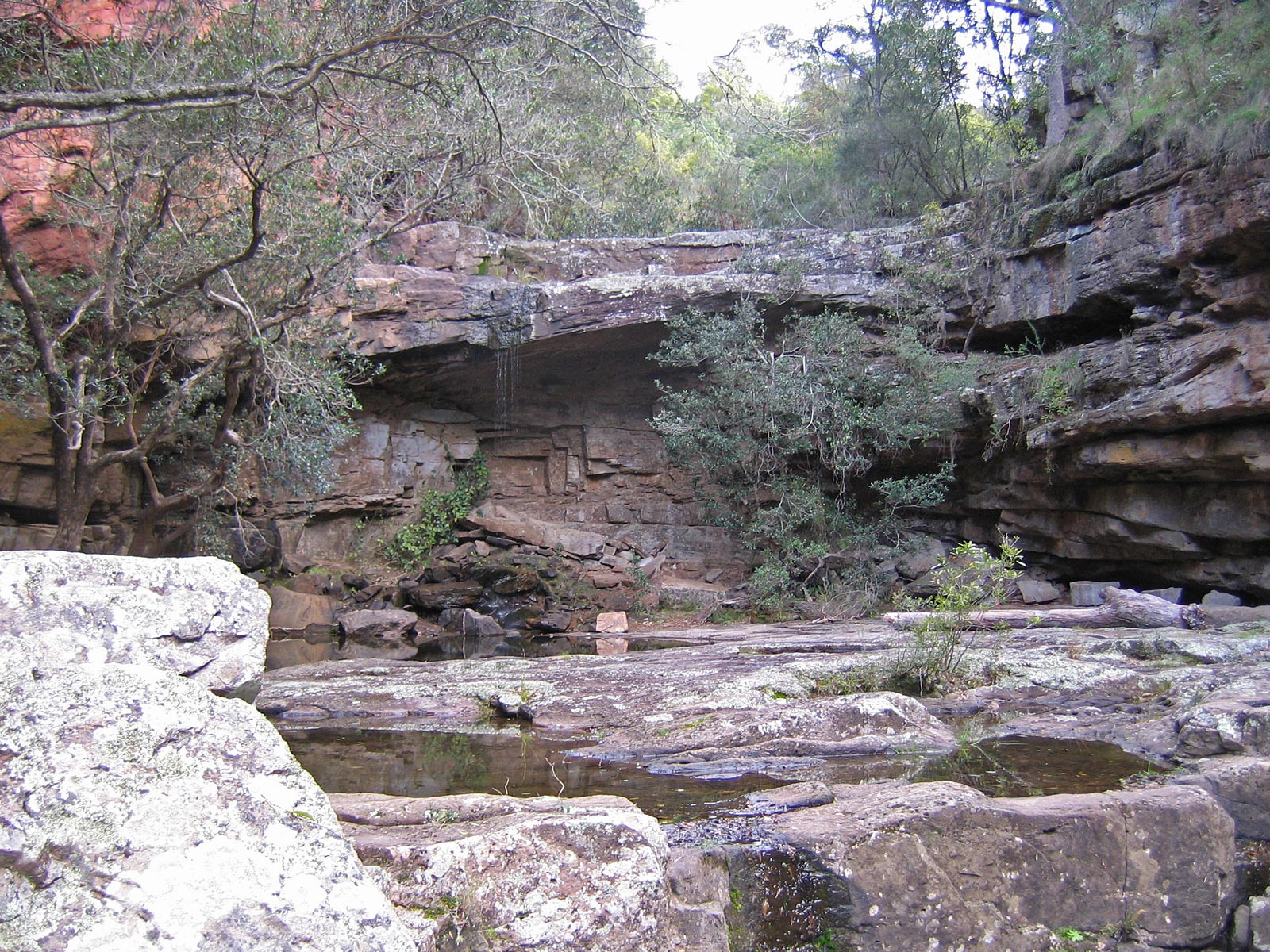
Deadcock Den

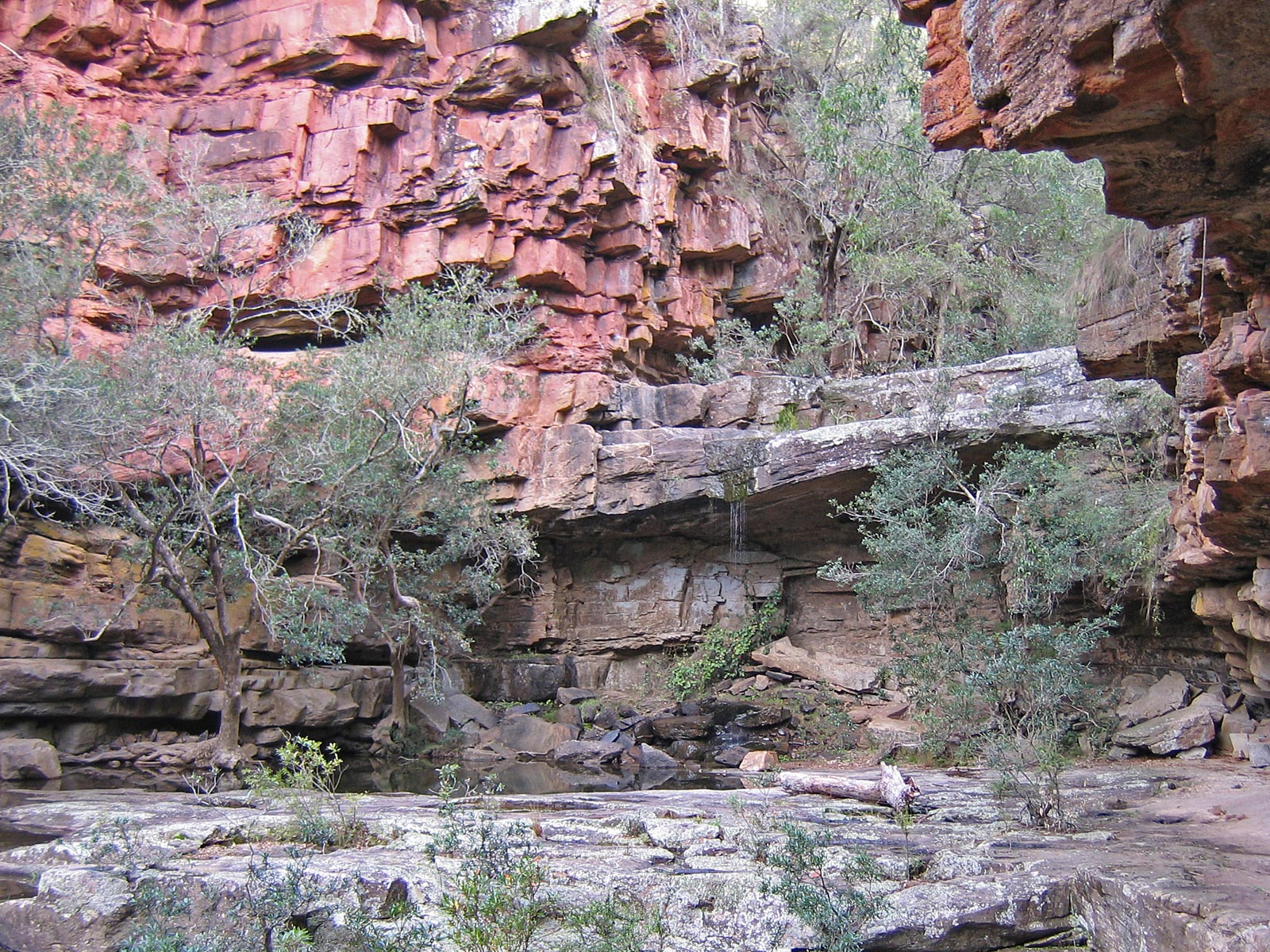
Deadcock Den

The cave is found on Woolshed Creek, a small tributary of the Mitchell River in the Mitchell River National Park, about one kilometre upstream from where the creek joins the river. The existence of the cave was first recorded by Alfred Howitt. After heavy rainfall, the opening of the cave may be hidden by a waterfall, which has excavated a pool at its base. The den was once rimmed with stalactites, but unfortunately these have been broken off as souvenirs by visitors over the years. Smaller stalactites may still exist inside the cave.

The area is a site of Aboriginal historical importance, and is located on the Batuluk Aboriginal Cultural Trail. Stories were told around aboriginal campfires about how the Nargun would abduct children who visited the rockpool. It was said the Nargun could not be harmed with boomerangs or spears, as they would be reflected back to the thrower. These stories served the dual purpose of a cautionary tale to keep children close to the campsite, and away from the sacred cave. The Den of Nargun was considered a special place for women of the Gunai tribe, and in reality was used for women's initiation and learning ceremonies rather than being the lair of any predator.

A similar, though less well known site, called Deadcock Den is situated on Woolshed Creek downstream from the Den of Nargun, only about 200m from where it joins the Mitchell River. This site was also of great cultural significance to the Gunai people, women in particular.

== Literary mentions ==
- In 1974, Australian author Patricia Wrightson wrote an award-winning children's novel called The Nargun and the Stars, which was later made into a television series. The plot involved a modern-day boy coming to live in a remote Australian valley where he discovers a variety of ancient creatures from the Aboriginal Dreaming. In this story, the Nargun is an indestructible stone being that slowly moves through the valley destroying all in its path. A later Patricia Wrightson story, The Ice Is Coming, suggested there were multiple Narguns.
- The cave was featured in the book Providence Ponds, written by Stanley Porteus in 1950.
- The Nargun is also mentioned in a short story called "The Slaughters of the Bulumwaal Butcher" by Bruce Pascoe, an indigenous author from the Wathaurong Aboriginal Co-operative of southern Victoria. The story is included in the Macquarie PEN Anthology of Aboriginal Literature edited by Anita Heiss and Peter Minter, Allen & Unwin 2008
- Angus McLean featured the Den of Nargun in his book Lindigo (1866).
- The Nargun plays a role in Sonya Hartnett's novel The Ghost's Child (2008).
- The Nargun is one of many aboriginal monsters that feature in the short story "The Song of Old Man Bunyip" by Richard Freeman in the anthology Bernice Summerfield: Secret Histories (Big Finish Productions 2009)

== See also ==
- Mycena nargan
