= Mitchell River silt jetties =

Coordinates: 37°51′50″S 147°43′30″E

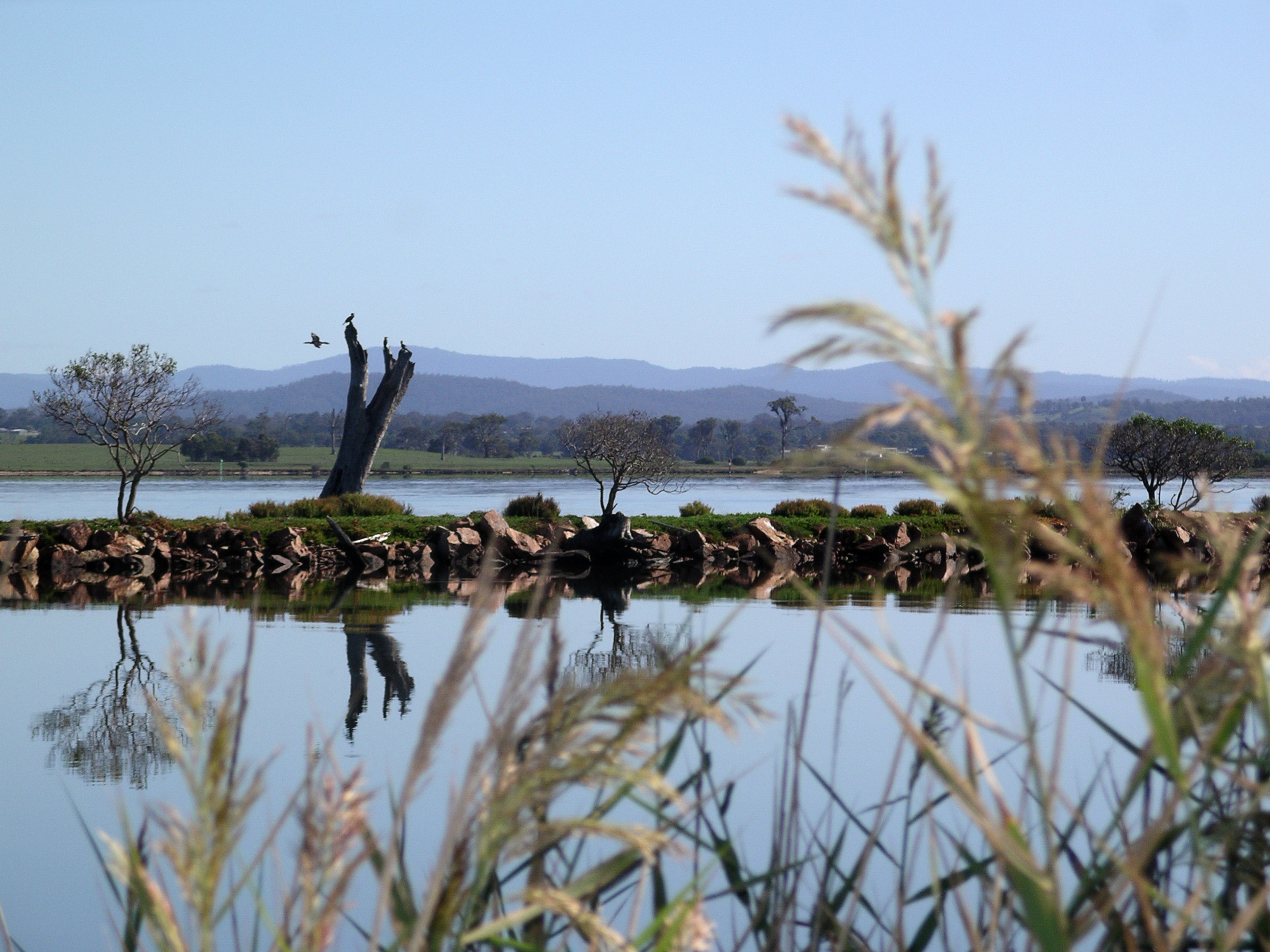
Mitchell River silt jetties, looking from the south bank towards the north bank, with the Mitchell River in the foreground and Jones Bay in the distance. The rocks lining the banks have been placed to prevent erosion.

The Mitchell River silt jetties are an unusually long, thin landform in the Gippsland Lakes region in Victoria, Australia. A type of digitate delta, they have been formed over thousands of years by sediment deposition from the Mitchell River during periods of low water flow and subsequent wash-through during periods of high water flow. The long narrow banks of silt thus formed extend more than eight kilometres east into Lake King. The south bank is navigable by car from Eagle Point through to the very easternmost tip at Point Dawson.

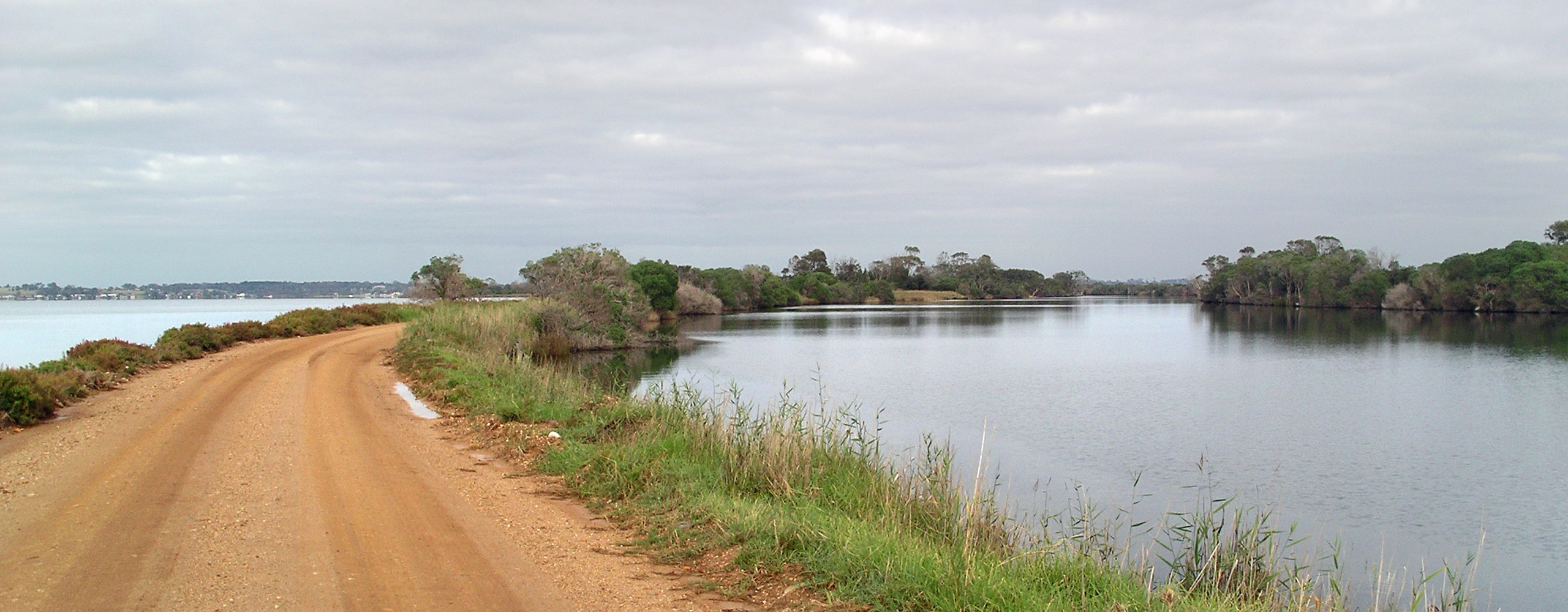
Panoramic view looking west along the Mitchell River silt jetties, with Lake King on the left.
