= The Seven Ages of Man =

Television series

- Starring: Kate Ferguson; John Waters; Jacki Weaver; Mark Lee; Melissa Jaffer; Kevin Miles
- Country of origin: Australia
- Original language: English
- No. of episodes: 7

Production
- Producer: Alan Burke
- Running time: 30 mins

Original release
- Network: ABC
- Release: 1975 – 1975

Related
- Quality of Mercy

The Seven Ages of Man is a 1975 Australian television series. It consisted of seven 30-minute episodes.

It was produced by Alan Burke.

== Cast ==
- Kate Ferguson as Patsy
- John Waters
- Jacki Weaver
- Mark Lee
- Melissa Jaffer
- Kevin Miles
- Julieanne Newbould

== Episodes ==
- Slipper'd Pantaloon w Ted Roberts d John Croyston
