= Harrisons Cut gold diversion =

Diversion dam in Victoria, Australia

Coordinates: 37°19′32″S 147°17′48″E

Harrisons Cut gold diversion sluice is located on the Dargo River approximately 15 km north of Dargo, Victoria, Australia. The 50 m cutting diverts a length of the river and allowed the exposed river bed to be sluiced for alluvial gold. No record has been found of Harrison's Cut or any undertaking of its kind. Its position suggests a construction date in the 1880s.

The cutting is one of around thirteen river diversions surviving from the Victorian gold rush.

The site is listed on the Victorian Heritage Register and covered by a Heritage Overlay.
