= The Nargun and the Stars =

Novel by Patricia Wrightson

- First edition cover
- Author: Patricia Wrightson
- Illustrator: Robert Ingpen
- Language: English
- Genre: Children's fantasy novel
- Publisher: Hutchinson
- Publication date: 1973
- Publication place: Australia
- Media type: Print (Hardcover)
- Pages: 158 pp
- ISBN: 0-09-117690-5

The Nargun and The Stars is a children's fantasy novel set in Australia, written by Patricia Wrightson. It was among the first Australian books for children to draw on Australian Aboriginal mythology. The book was the winner of the 1974 Children's Book Council of Australia Children's Book of the Year Award for Older Readers, and Patricia Wrightson was awarded an Order of the British Empire in 1977, largely for this work.

The story was adapted for television and screened as a mini-series in Australia in 1981.

== Plot ==
The story is set in Australia, and involves an orphaned city boy named Simon Brent who comes to live on a 5000-acre sheep station called Wongadilla, in the Hunter Region, with his mother's second cousins, Edie and Charlie. In a remote valley on the property he discovers a variety of ancient Australian Aboriginal Dreamtime creatures. The arrival of heavy machinery intent on clearing the land brings to life the ominous stone Nargun. The Nargun is a creature drawn from tribal legends of the Gunai or Kurnai people of the area now known as the Mitchell River National Park in Victoria. Other creatures featured in the story include the mischievous green-scaled water-spirit Potkoorok, the Turongs (tree people) and the Nyols (cave people).

== Editions ==
English editions of The Nargun and the Stars by P. Wrightson:

- 1973 by Hutchinson (London and Sydney). ISBN 0-09-117690-5
- 1974 by Atheneum Books (New York). ISBN 0-689-30432-3
- 1975 by Puffin Books, illustrated. ISBN 978-0-14-030780-1
- 1973 by Puffin Books (Penguin Books). ISBN 0-14-030780-X
- 1973 by Hutchinson (London) ISBN 0-09-117690-5
- 1986 by M. K. McElderry Books (New York). ISBN 0-689-50403-9
- 1988 by Hutchinson (Australia), illustrated by Robert Ingpen. ISBN 0-09-157440-4
- 2001 by Bt Bound. ISBN 978-0-8335-1857-6
- 2008 by University of Queensland Press. ISBN 978-0-7022-3683-9
- 2009 by Phoenix Education, illustrated. ISBN 978-1-921085-97-0
- 2009 by Catnip. ISBN 978-1-84647-076-9

Non-English editions of The Nargun and the Stars:

- (Afrikaans) Die Nargan en die sterre, published by Kaapstad : Human & Rousseau : World International, 1990 ISBN 978-0-7981-2758-5
- (Finnish) Nargun ja tähdet, published by Hki : Tammi, 1988 ISBN 978-951-30-7037-3
- (German) Das Nargun und die Sterne, published by Friedrich Oetinger, Hamburg. 1990 ISBN 978-3-7891-5101-9
- (Japanese) 星に叫ぶ岩ナルガン / (Hoshi ni sakebu iwa narugan), published by 評論社, Hyōronsha, Shōwa 57 (Tokyo) 1982 ISBN 978-4-566-01157-1
- (Slovenian) Simon in kamniti tujec, published by Mladinska knjiga, Ljubljana, 1979 OCLC 440381039
- (Spanish) El Nargun y las estrellas, published by Ediciones Alfaguara, Madrid, 1987 ISBN 978-84-204-4569-4
- (Swedish) Nargonen och stjärnorna, published by Berghs Förlag, Malmö 1980 ISBN 978-91-502-0569-5

== Awards ==
- Won – CBCA Children's Book of the Year Award: Older Readers (1974)

== Television mini-series ==
The story was made into a mini-series for television in 1977–1978 by the Australian Broadcasting Corporation, the screenplay adapted by Margaret Kelly. The producer was Lynn Bayonas. The series contained five episodes, each of thirty minutes duration, was first screened on 15 September 1981.
