= Lynn Bayonas =

Australian television producer

- Born: Lynette Margaret Bower; 11 April 1943
- Died: 25 January 2010 (aged 66); Daylesford, Victoria, Australia
- Occupations: Television producer, television writer
- Years active: 1964–2008
- Spouse: Luis Bayonas
- Relatives: Susan Bower

Lynnette Margaret Bayonas (11 April 1943 – 25 January 2010) was an Australian television producer and writer. Her sister was Neighbours executive producer Susan Bower.

== Personal life ==
Bower was 18 years old and living in London when she got her breakthrough into television. She was an assistant to the general manager of The Australian Ballet who were then travelling through Europe and were due to travel on to the United States, somewhere that Bayonas didn't want to go.

Whilst working in London, Bayonas heard of a job coming up with Citizen Kane creator Orson Welles. She agreed to meet Welles when he was making Casino Royale with Peter Sellers, Bayonas told him how she wasn't enjoying her job at the Australian Ballet and Welles invited her to Spain immediately. While working in Spain she met her future husband, Luis Bayonas, a writer, art director and assistant director.

== Career ==
Bayonas' first job was taking notes for the film that Welles was working on at the time. Bayonas admitted that working with Welles taught her about flexibility in storytelling and turned her against many writing courses that she felt were structured.

After meeting her husband in Spain, Bayonas wanted to return to Australia, and Crawford Productions allowed her to do that by appointing her as script editor and writer on shows Homicide, Division 4, The Box and The Sullivans. In the 1980s she started work on A Country Practice, the programme that later allowed her sister Susan Bower to break into television writing. Whilst working for Nine Network, she created and worked as the creative consultant on the cult serial, Chances, which had a two-year run from 1991-92. All 126 episodes of this series were released on DVD and Blu-ray in August 2021.

Beginning in 1994, Bayonas lived in Los Angeles, California for six years, writing for Paramount Pictures. During her time in Los Angeles, she worked on programmes such as Sunset Beach and Prime Time. In 2000, Bayonas decided to return to Australia and began work on television programmes such as The Saddle Club, The Secret Life of Us and Lawrence of Arabia. In 2008, just as the third series of The Saddle Club finished production, cancer took hold of Bayonas meaning that this was Bayonas' last work before her death from cancer in January 2010.

She was also head of her own production company, Lynn Bayonas Productions, based in Preston, Victoria

== Filmography ==
=== Television ===
Role	Production	Duration
Writer	Homicide	1964
Writer	Division 4	1969
Writer/Script Editor	Homicide	1971–72
Writer	The Box	1974
Writer	Quality of Mercy	1975
Writer	The Sullivans	1976
Writer	Skyways	1979
Producer	The Nargun and the Stars	1980
Writer	Holiday Island	1981
Script Consultant	Hector's Bunyip	1986
Writer/Creator	Willing and Abel	1987
Producer	Raw Silk	1988
Writer	Chances	1991
Producer/Writer	Good Vibrations	1992
Writer	A Country Practice	1994
Producer	The Saddle Club	2001–08
Producer	Guinevere Jones	2002
Writer	Parallax	2004

== Death ==
It was announced on 25 January 2010 that Bayonas had died following a long battle with cancer. She was 66 years old. The Australian soap opera Neighbours, of which Bayonas's sister Susan Bower is an executive producer, marked Bayonas's death at the end of their episode broadcast on 25 January 2010 with a title card as the credits rolled.
