= Mount Selwyn (mountain) =

Mountain in Victoria, Australia

- Location within Alpine Shire

Highest point
- Elevation: 1,411 metres (4,629 ft) AHD
- Coordinates: 37°2′38″S 146°53′57″E

Geography
- Location: Alpine National Park, Victoria, Australia
- Parent range: Victorian Alps, Great Dividing Range

Mount Selwyn is a mountain that is part of the Victorian Alps of the Great Dividing Range, located in the Alpine National Park in the Australian state of Victoria. Mount Selwyn has an altitude of 1,411 metres (4,629 ft) AHD.

It was named by explorer and geologist Alfred Howitt after the geologist Alfred Selwyn, who was the director of the Geological Survey of Victoria from 1852 to 1869.

Located approximately 30 kilometres (19 mi) from Dinner Plain, 35 kilometres (22 mi) from Bright, and 38 kilometres (24 mi) from Porepunkah, the nearest sealed road to Mount Selwyn is the Great Alpine Road.

== See also ==
- List of mountains in Australia § Victoria
