= Mitchell River National Park (Victoria) =

National park in Victoria, Australia

- IUCN category II (national park)
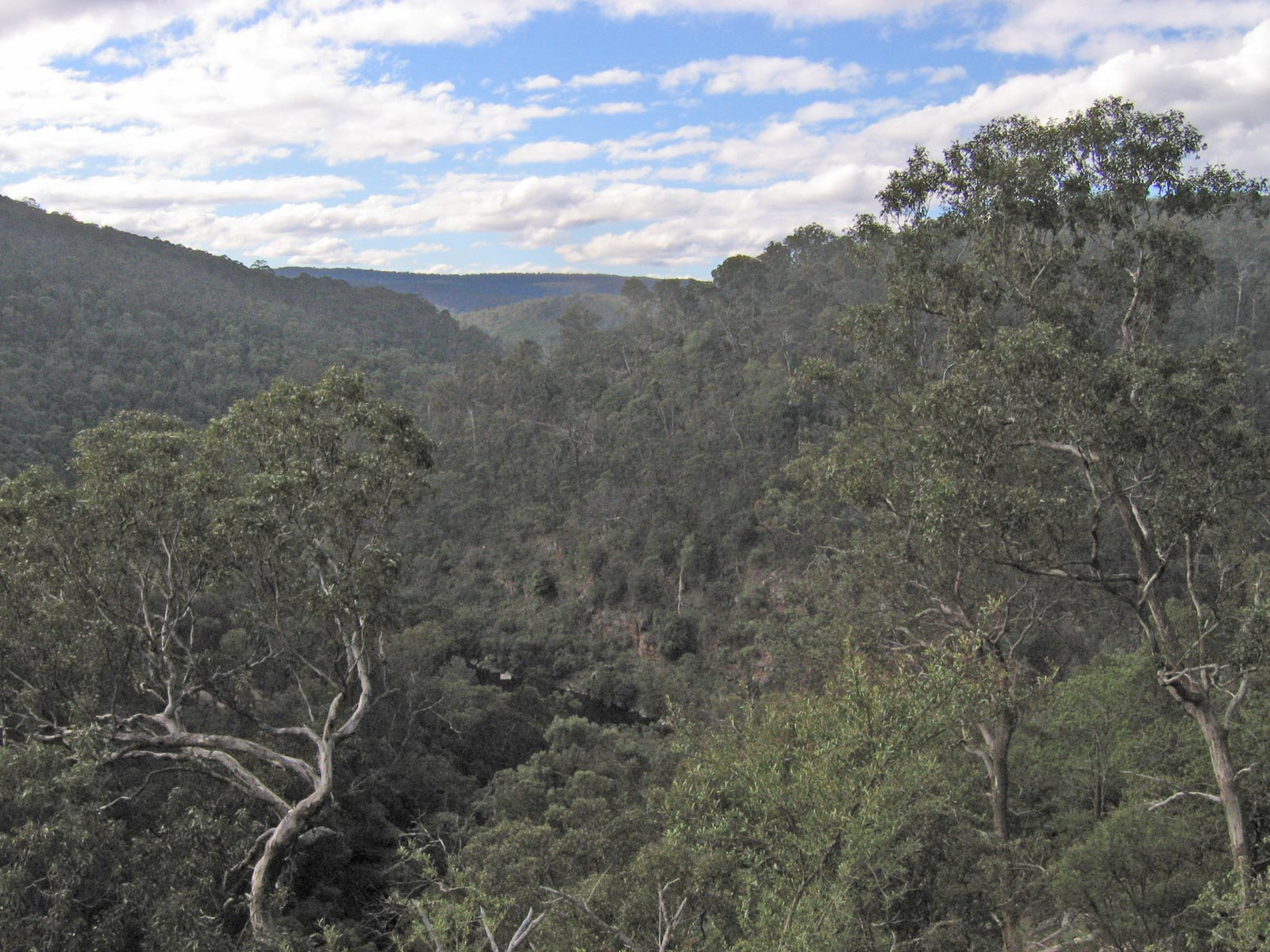
- The Mitchell River valley looking north from The Bluff Lookout

- Location within Victoria
- Location: Victoria
- Nearest city: Bairnsdale
- Coordinates: 37°39′20″S 147°20′44″E
- Area: 142.5 km^{2} (55.0 sq mi)
- Established: December 1962
- Governing body: Parks Victoria
- Website: Official website

The Mitchell River National Park is a national park located in the Gippsland region of Victoria, Australia. The 14,250-hectare (35,200-acre) national park is situated approximately 320 kilometres (200 mi) east of Melbourne via the Princes Highway, and approximately 25 kilometres (16 mi) northwest of Bairnsdale. The northern portion of the park may be accessed via Dargo.

== Mitchell River ==
The park's central feature is the Mitchell River, which is the largest unregulated river in Victoria and provides a unique example of riparian ecology.

According to a Land Conservation Council Rivers & Streams Special Investigation completed in 1990, "It is an important example of the large-scale biological systems that were once widespread in south-eastern Australia." In 1992 the Mitchell River was listed as a Heritage River.

== The park ==
The national park surrounds the spectacular Mitchell River where it has cut its way through rock strata creating high cliffs and several gorges. The park originated as the Glenaladale National Park in 1963 following a donation of 163 hectares (400 acres) of land from Australian Paper Manufacturers Ltd. An addition of 112.7 hectares (278 acres) was made in 1986 at which time the name was changed to the Mitchell River National Park. The park was further extended in 2003 by 2,375 hectares (5,870 acres) to bring the total area to 14,250 hectares (35,200 acres).

In some of the gorges are found remnants of warm-temperate rainforest, the southernmost occurrence of this type of forest in the world. It can survive here as the steep walls of the gorges protect it from the annual drying summer winds and the bushfires that occasionally rage through the area.

There are recorded sightings of more than 150 bird species and 25 mammal species in the park. Vegetation in the park includes papery-barked kanooka trees, lilly-pillys, muttonwoods, ferns, mosses, vines, and lianas. In the drier areas, typical Australian species such as wattle and eucalypt dominate.

The Mitchell River was an important location to the Gunai/Kurnai nation, especially the Brabuwooloong and the Brayakuloong people of central Gippsland. One of the features of the park is the Den of Nargun mentioned in Aboriginal legends.

Gold was discovered in the area in 1857. Alluvial fields along the Mitchell River and its tributaries were worked into the early twentieth century, while there was also some reef mining from the 1860s. Later use by Europeans mainly involved timber and farming.

=== Den of Nargun ===
According to Gunai tribal legends, the Nargun is a fierce half-human half-stone creature that lived in the den, a cave under a rock overhang behind a small waterfall. The Den of Nargun is found on Woolshed Creek, a small tributary of the Mitchell River, about 1 kilometre (0.62 mi) upstream from where the creek joins the river. In the legend the Nargun would abduct children who visited the rockpool. It was said the Nargun could not be harmed with boomerangs or spears, as they would be reflected back to the thrower.

The Den of Nargun was considered a special place for women of the Gunai tribe, being used for women's initiation and learning ceremonies. Thus the stories would have served the purpose of keeping children away from the sacred area, as well as keeping them near the campsite. The den was once rimmed with stalactites, but unfortunately these have been broken off as souvenirs by visitors over the years. A similar, though less well known site, called Deadcock Den is situated on Woolshed Creek downstream from the Den of Nargun, only about 200 metres (660 ft) from where it joins the Mitchell River. This site was also of great cultural significance to the Gunai people, in particular the women.

== Gallery ==
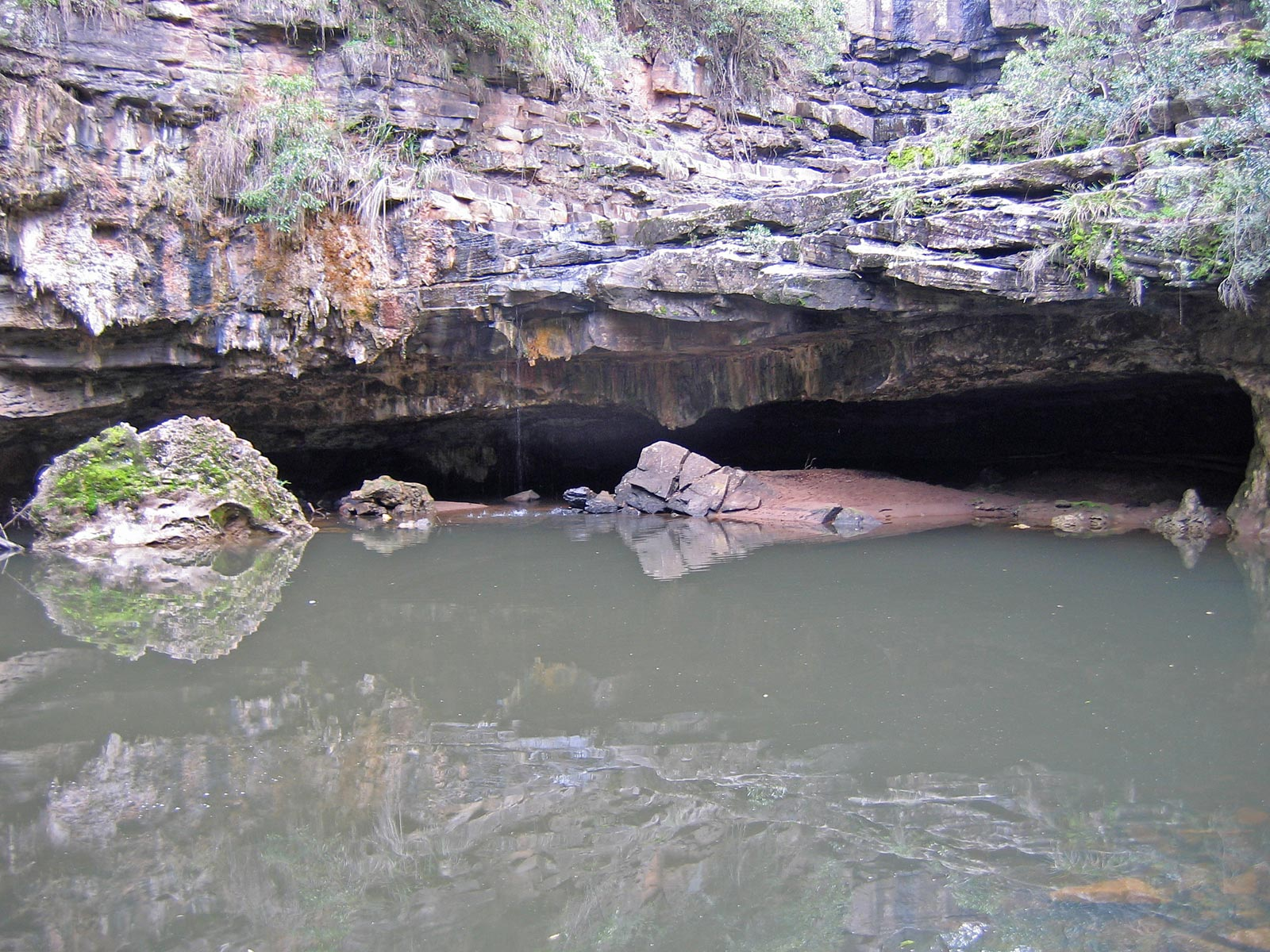
The Den of Nargun.

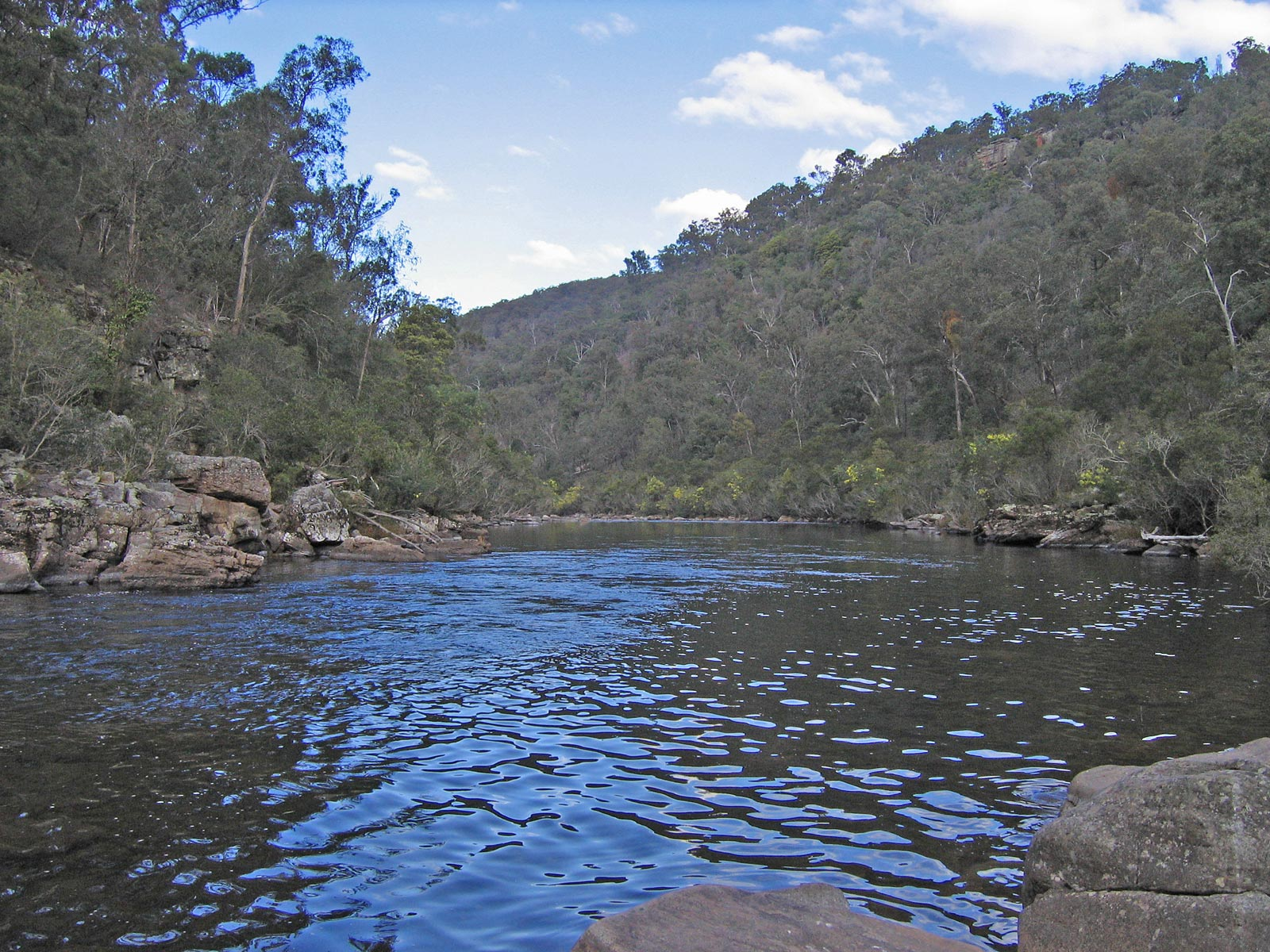
Mitchell River near the junction with Woolshed Creek.

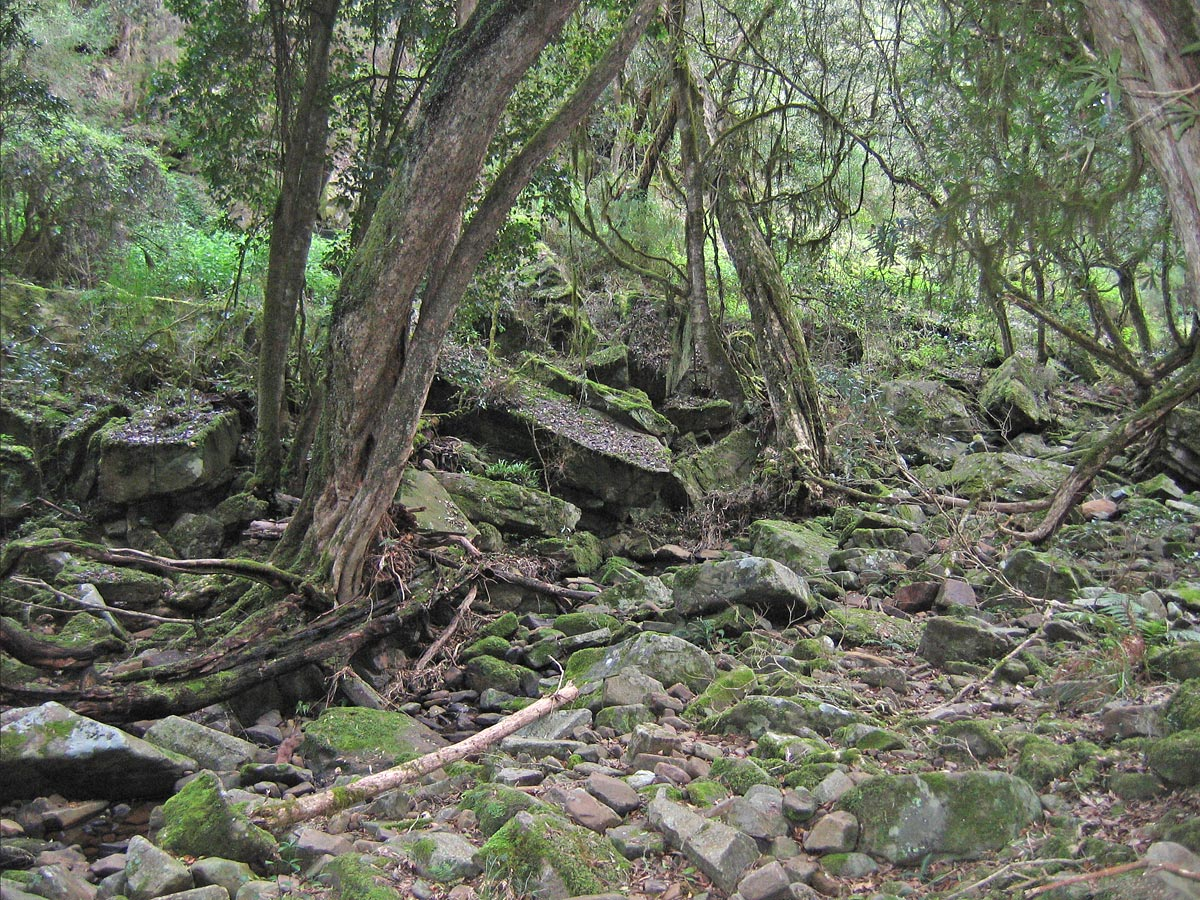
Warm-temperate rainforest found along Woolshed Creek.

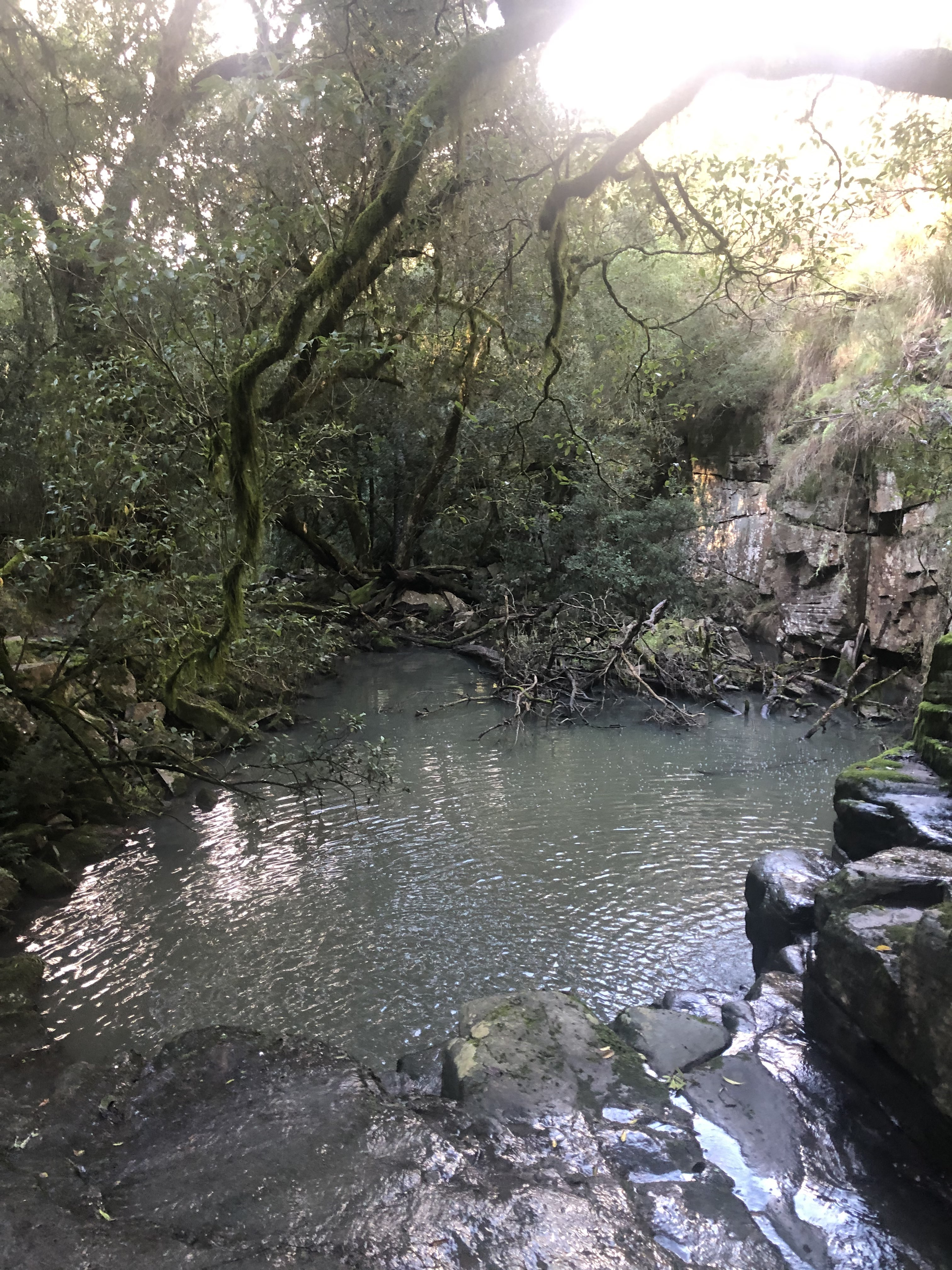
A small pond in the national park.

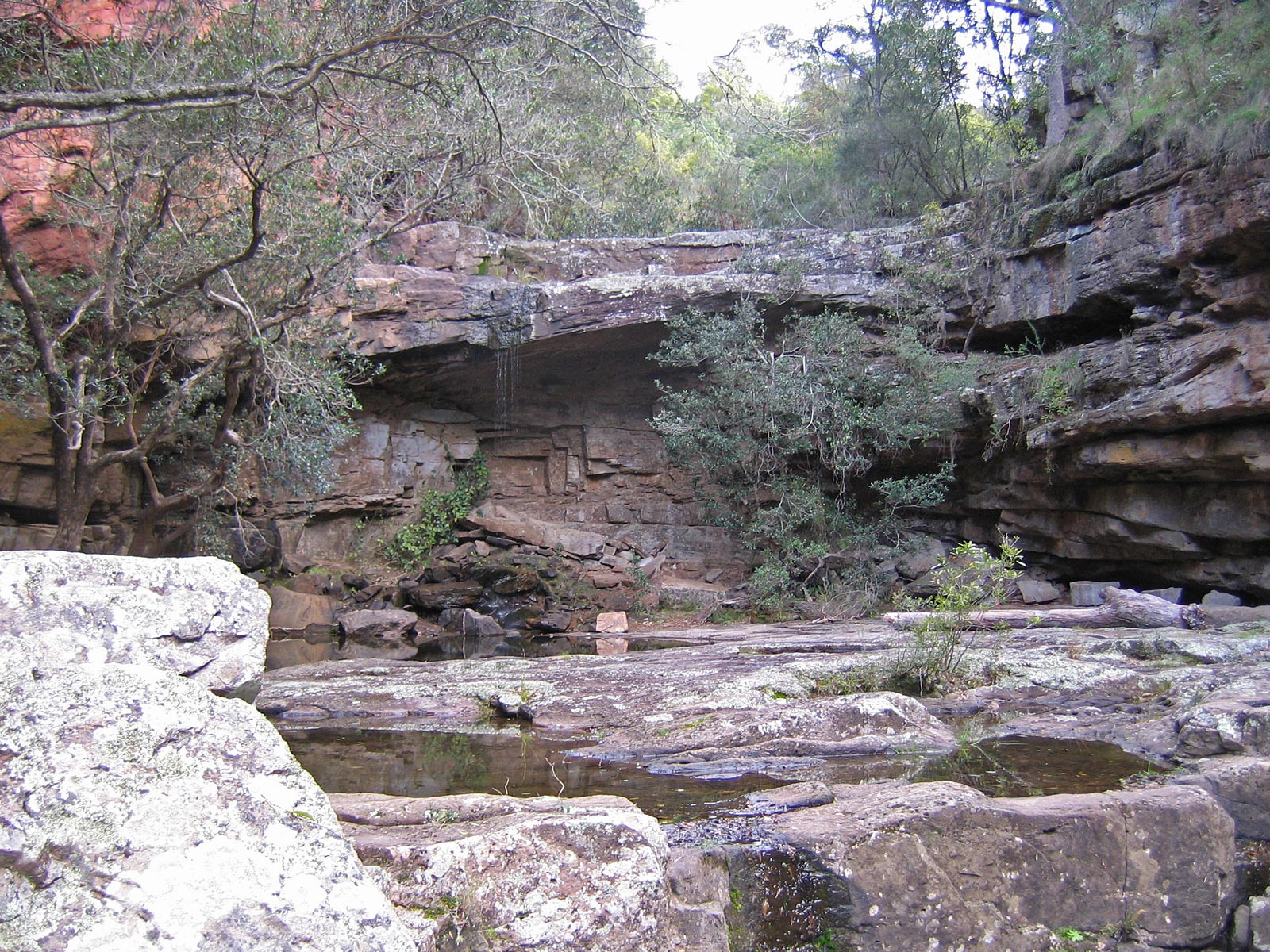
Deadcock Den, a site of cultural significance to the Gunai women.

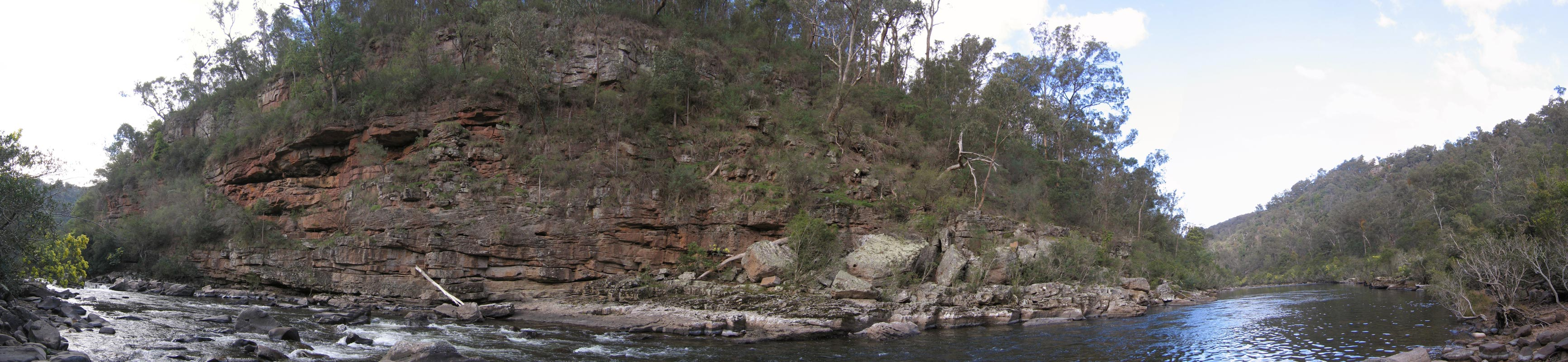
Panorama of the Mitchell River as it carves a valley through the Mitchell River National Park.

== See also ==
- Protected areas of Victoria
- List of national parks of Australia
