= Mitchell River (Victoria) =

River in Victoria, Australia

Mitchell
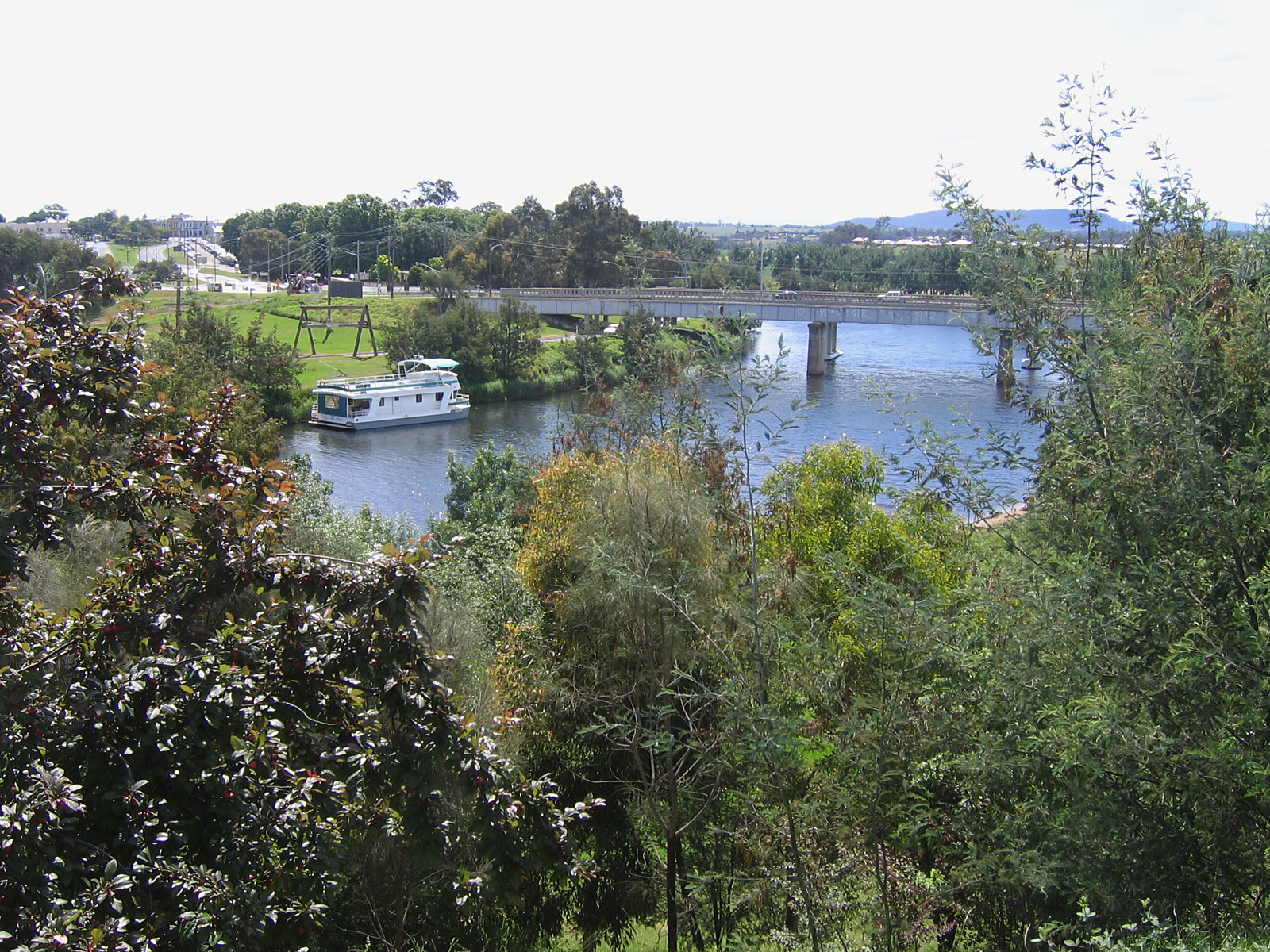
- The Mitchell River in Bairnsdale

- Location of the Mitchell River mouth in Victoria
- Etymology: Thomas Mitchell, Surveyor-General of New South Wales
- Native name: Wangan (Kurnai); Wy-yung (Brabralung); Wahyang

Location
- Country: Australia
- State: Victoria
- Region: South East Corner (IBRA), South East Coastal Plain (IBRA), East Gippsland
- Local government area: Shire of East Gippsland
- Settlements: Lindenow, Bairnsdale

Physical characteristics
- Source: Great Dividing Range
- Source confluence: Wentworth and Wonnangatta Rivers and Swamp Creek
  - location: Horseshoe Bend, north of Mitchell River National Park
  - coordinates: 37°34′41″S 147°22′8″E
  - elevation: 137 m (449 ft)
- Mouth: Lake King
  - coordinates: 37°53′45″S 147°58′37″E
  - elevation: 0 m (0 ft)
- Length: 121 km (75 mi)
- Basin size: 4,651.8 km^{2} (1,796.1 mi^{2})
- Discharge
  - location: Near mouth
  - average: 42.3 m^{3}/s (1,330 GL/a)

Basin features
- River system: East Gippsland catchment
- Tributaries
  - left: Sandy Creek (Victoria), Bald Hill Creek (Victoria), Watts Creek, Flaggy Creek, Prospect Creek (Victoria), Clifton Creek, Nicholson River, Tambo River, Mississippi Creek
  - right: Cobbannah Creek, Bull Creek (Victoria), Woolshed Creek, Iguana Creek, Latrobe River
- National park: Mitchell River NP

The Mitchell River is a perennial river of the East Gippsland catchment, in the Australian state of Victoria. The unregulated river provides a unique example of riparian ecology, flowing generally south with the catchment area drawing from the steep mountains of the Victorian Alps to enter Lake King, one of the Gippsland Lakes, and then empty into the Bass Strait.

== Course and features ==
Formed by the confluence of the Wentworth and Wonnangatta rivers and Swamp Creek near Horseshoe Bend, north of the national park that bears its name, the Mitchell River rises in Lake Tabberabbera, drained by runoff from the southern Victorian Alps of the Great Dividing Range. The river flows generally south in a highly meandering course in its upper reaches through the Mitchell River National Park, and then south by east as it spills onto the fertile Gippsland Plain west of Lindenow. The river then flows generally east towards Bairnsdale and empties into Jones Bay, part of Lake King, within the Gippsland Lakes via the silt jetties, a narrow 8 kilometres (5.0 mi) long digitate delta. Within the lake, the Mitchell is joined by the Nicholson and Tambo rivers; and then enters Lake Victoria, where the Mitchell and Latrobe rivers form their confluence, with the Mitchell reaching its mouth in Bass Strait, south of Lakes Entrance. The river descends 137 metres (449 ft) over its 121-kilometre (75 mi) course; joined by more than thirteen tributaries, many of which are surrounded by dense native forest.

At Bairnsdale, the river is traversed by the Princes Highway, west of the highway's junction with the Great Alpine Road. Also at Bairnsdale, the railway line from Melbourne to Orbost crossed the river. However, the V/Line rail service now terminates at Bairnsdale railway station, west of the river; with a V/Line, coach bus service now operating east of Bairnsdale. As of 2009, the former railway crossing of the river has been identified as a potential asset of the East Gippsland Rail Trail, however the current poor condition of the bridge makes it unsafe for use.

== Ecology ==
According to the Land Conservation Council Rivers & Streams Special Investigation 1990, "It is an important example of the large-scale biological systems that were once widespread in south-eastern Australia." The Mitchell River was listed as a Heritage River in 1992.

The Mitchell River National Park surrounds the spectacular Mitchell River where it passes between high cliffs and several gorges. The Den of Nargun mentioned in Aboriginal legends is found about 1 kilometre (0.62 mi) from the river on a small tributary called Woolshed Creek. The Mitchell River was an important location to the Gunai/Kurnai nation, especially Brabuwooloong and the Brayakuloong people of central Gippsland.

The upper reaches of the Wonnangatta and Dargo rivers were mapped in 1850. From the 1860s, Bairnsdale developed as a port with the Mitchell River navigable for several kilometres upstream of Bairnsdale. The Gippsland Lakes provided access to steamers via Lakes Entrance for transport of livestock, timber, wool, skins and hides to market in Melbourne.

The Mitchell River is prone to flooding, sometimes cutting off towns such as Wy Yung and Lucknow from Bairnsdale and causing extensive damage to property, farmland and infrastructure. Most notable recent floods were those of April 1990 and June 2007. These floods are usually caused by severe weather systems in the Gippsland region that also flood other nearby rivers such as the Thomson and Avon rivers in the West Gippsland catchment.

The tributary rivers have a very large population of Australian grayling, which is listed as a vulnerable species by the Department of Sustainability and Environment, and has a very high conservation value.

=== River delta geology ===
The Mitchell River delta is a classic form of digitate delta and ranks as one of the world’s finest examples of this type of landform. The river sweeps near the western shore of Lake King before hitting Eagle Point Bluff and heading east into the lake.

Where the river meets the lake a river delta alluvial deposition of sediment has formed, known locally as silt jetties, which extend more than 8 kilometres east into the lake. Silt deposited by this process forms into long narrow banks which run many kilometres. The silt was deposited over the past 10,000 or so years - since the end of the last glaciation and the rise in sea levels that flooded the Gippsland Lakes - to form silt banks or islets as the speed of the river slows. The silt jetties have been nominated by geologists as a site of international significance, second in size to those of the Mississippi River at the Gulf of Mexico.

The Mitchell River silt jetties are subject to erosion caused by a salinity increase in the lakes which is slowly killing off the vegetation. The creation and maintenance of the channel at Lakes Entrance in 1889, harvesting of catchment water and decreased rainfall during drought has increased salinity in the Lakes. Destruction of reeds, cattle grazing on the river banks, access by anglers, and scouring by boat wash also contribute to erosion.

Marshes near the river support an extensive range of waterbirds, including migratory waders and is used for education and interpretation purposes. The wetlands surrounding the Gippsland Lakes are listed for international significance under the Ramsar Convention on Wetlands.

== Etymology ==
There are a number of Australian Aboriginal names for the river including the same phrase or word meaning a "spoon-billed duck" spelled variously as Wangan in the Ganai language; Wy-yung in Brabralung language; and Wahyang in no defined language group.

The current name of the river in drawn from the early colonial explorer and pastoralist, Angus McMillan, who named the river in 1839 in honour of Thomas Mitchell, an explorer and Surveyor General of New South Wales.

== Gallery ==
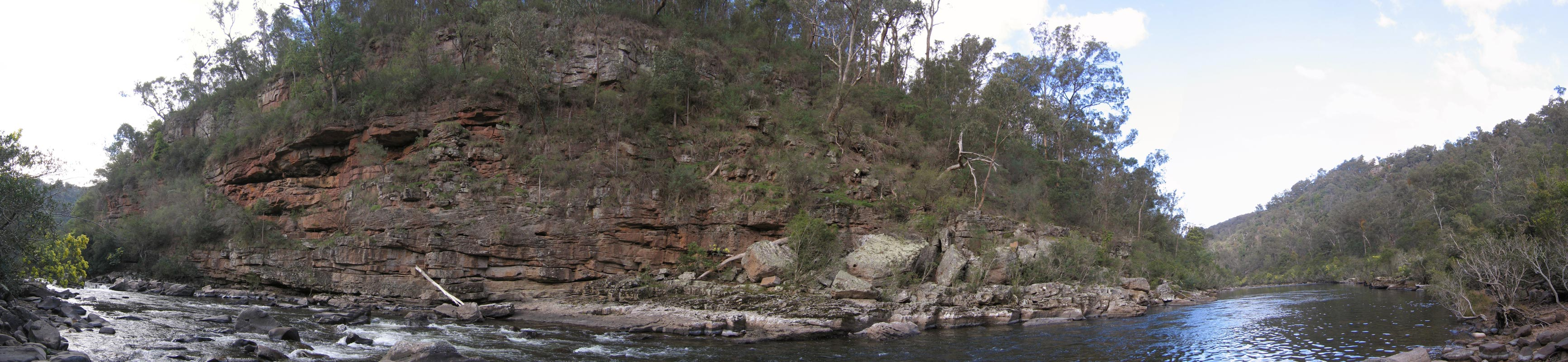
Panorama of the Mitchell River as it carves a valley through the Mitchell River National Park

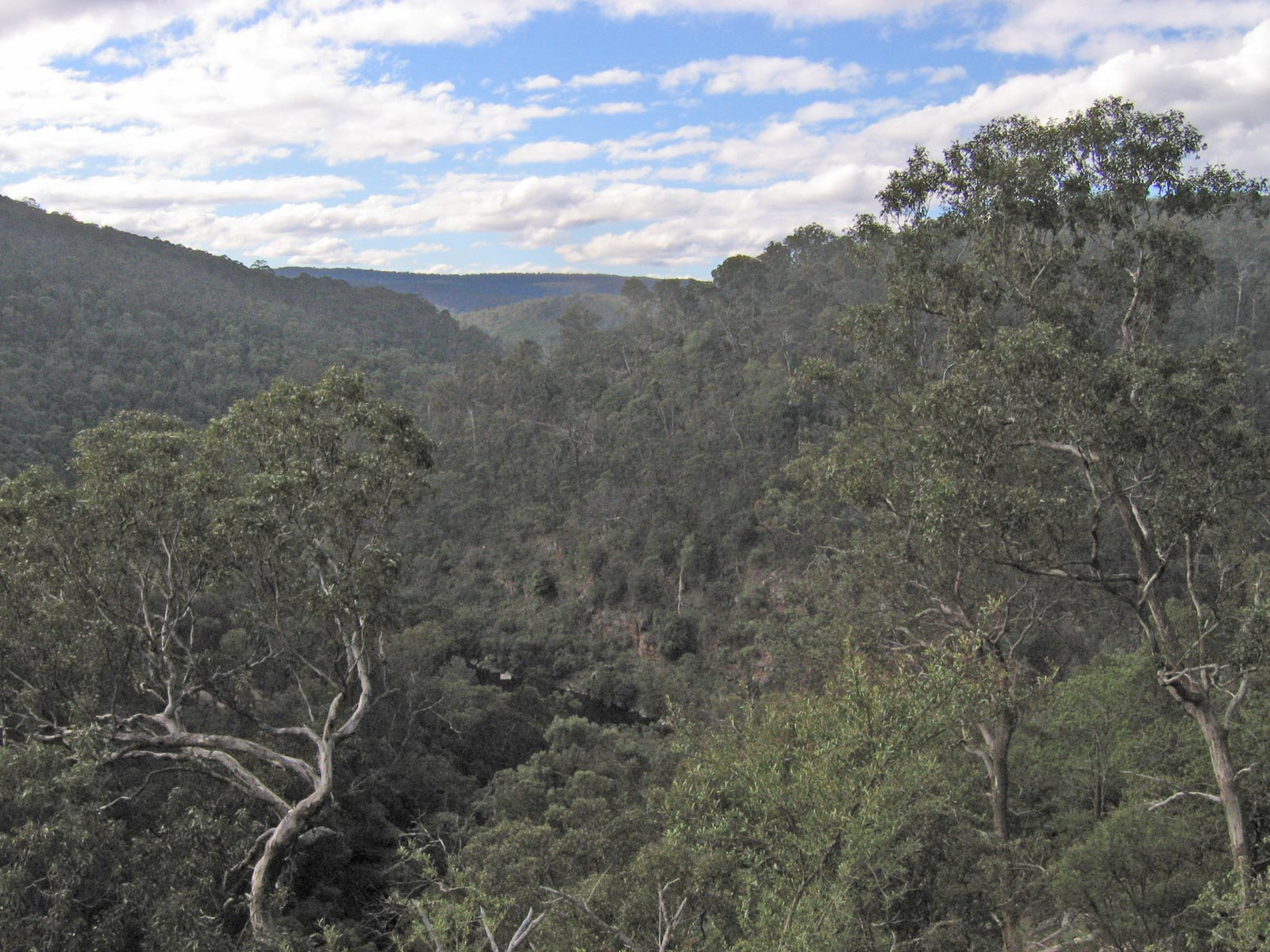
The river valley looking north from The Bluff Lookout high above the river in the Mitchell River National Park

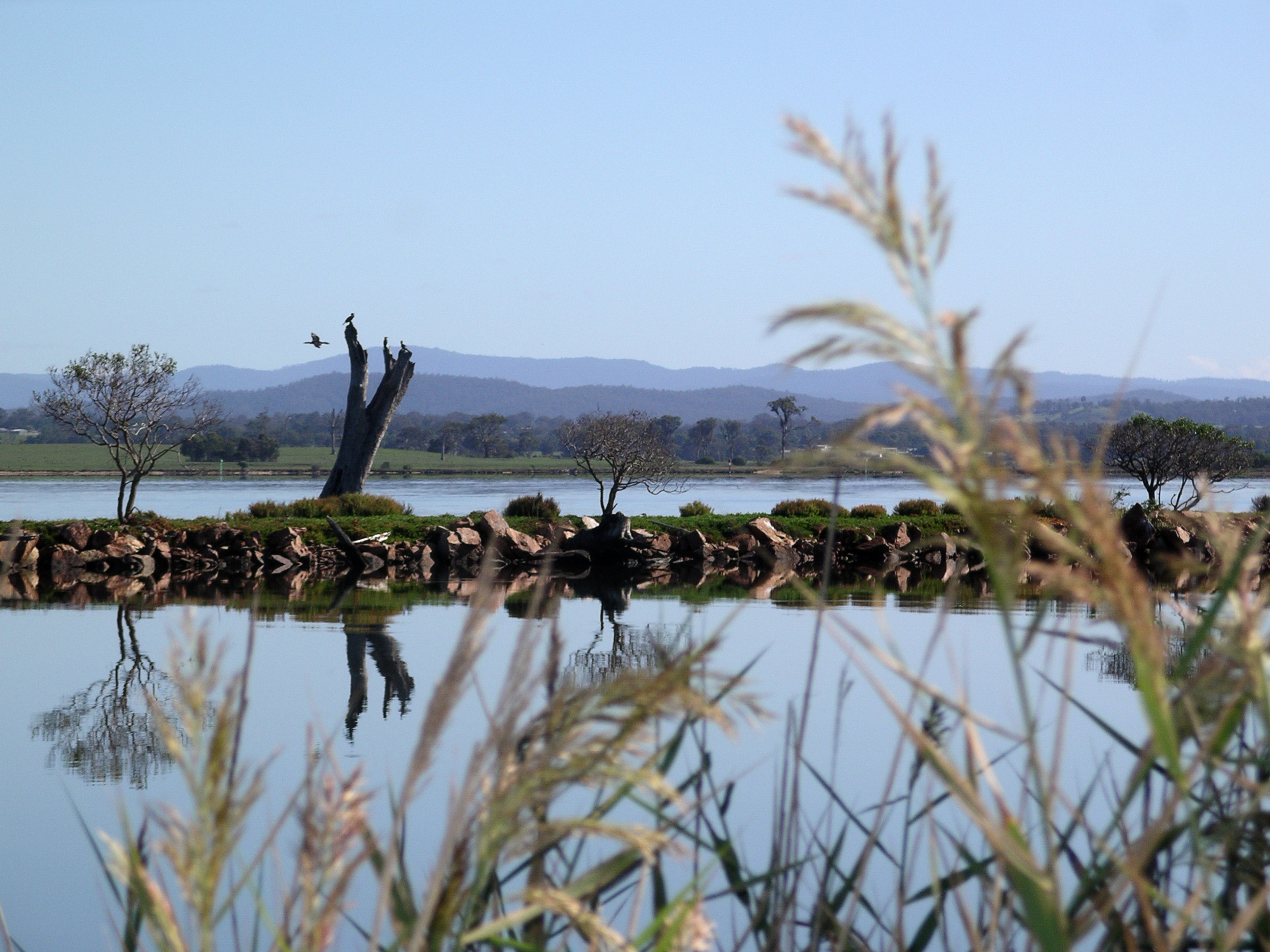
Mitchell River silt jetties, with the river in the foreground and Lake King in the distance

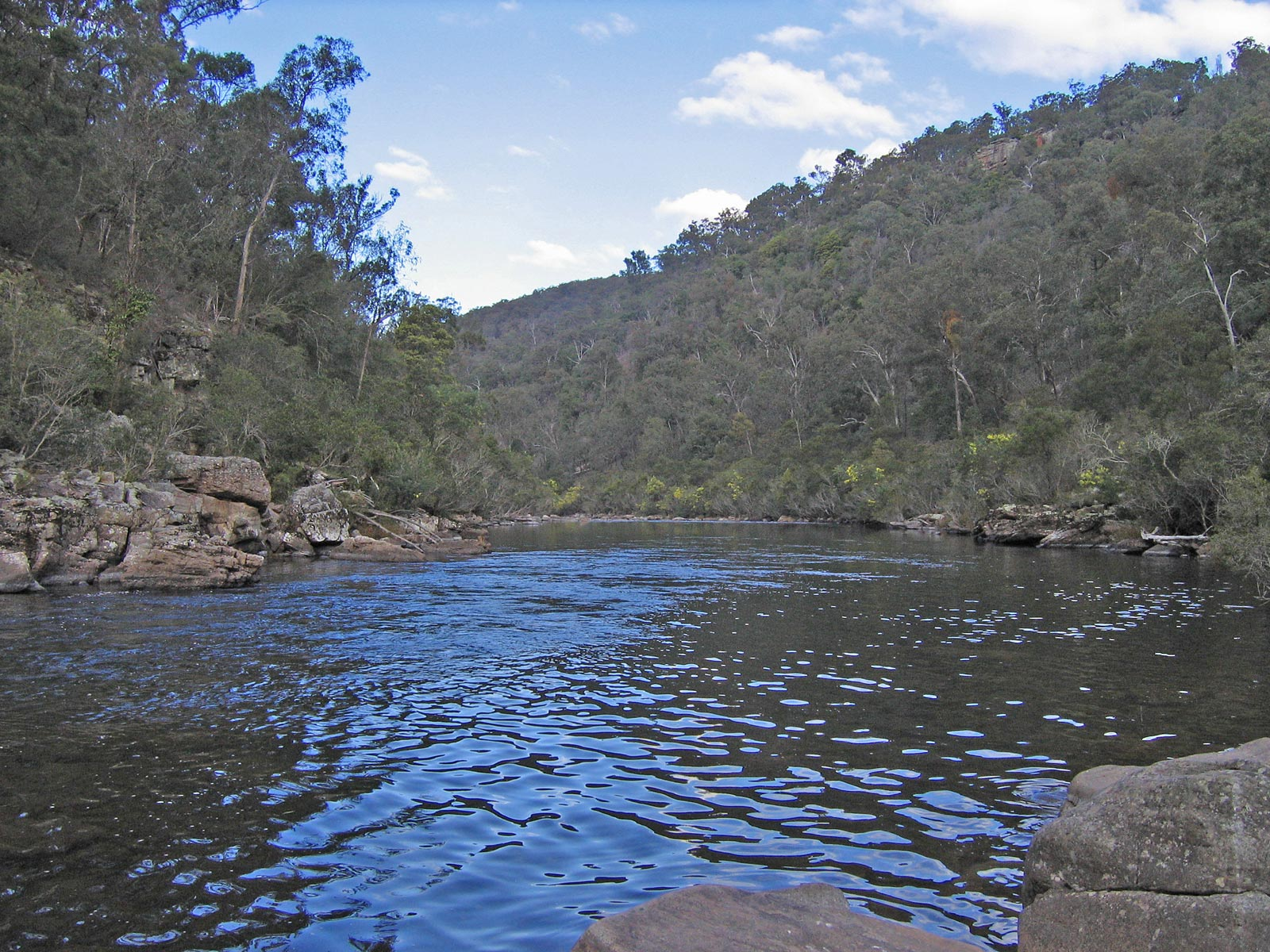
Downstream on the river near the junction with Woolshed Creek in the national park
