= Dargo, Victoria =

Dargo
- Town
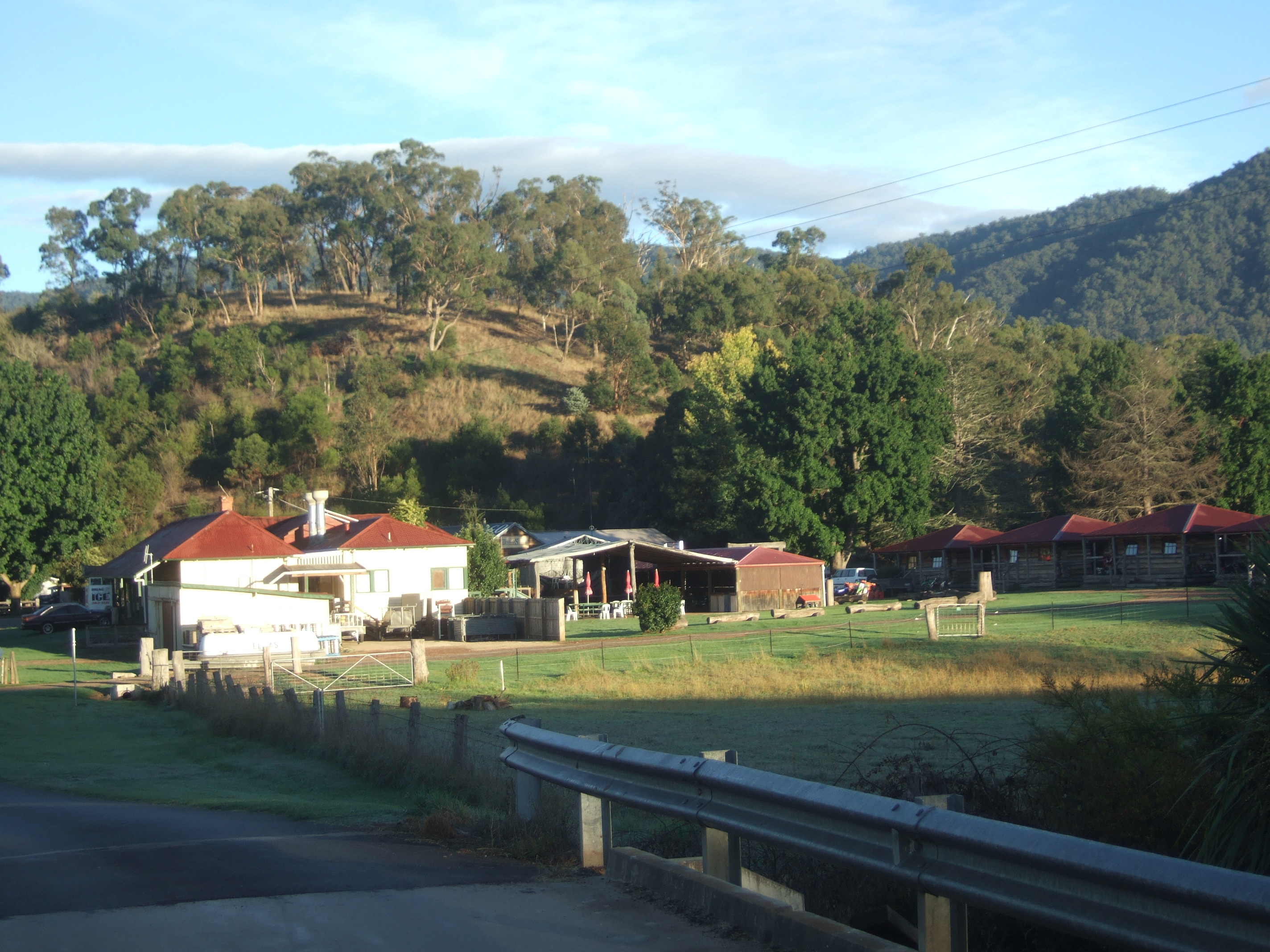
- The Dargo Hotel

- Interactive map of Dargo
- Coordinates: 37°29′S 147°16′E
- Country: Australia
- State: Victoria
- Region: Gippsland, , Hume
- LGAs: Shire of Wellington; Alpine Shire
- Location: 314 km (195 mi) E of Melbourne; 100 km (62 mi) N of Sale; 68 km (42 mi) N of Briagolong

Government
  - State electorate: Gippsland East
  - Federal division: Gippsland
- Elevation: 480 m (1,570 ft)

Population
  - Total: 105 (2021 census)
- Postcode: 3862
- Mean max temp: 18.7 °C (65.7 °F)
- Mean min temp: 9.2 °C (48.6 °F)
- Annual rainfall: 874.3 mm (34.42 in)

Dargo is a town in Victoria, Australia, located 348 kilometres (216 mi) east of Melbourne, in the Shire of Wellington. At the 2016 census, Dargo and the surrounding area had a population of 99. The median age of residents was 63.

The town provided a stopover for Victorian gold rush miners on their way to the goldfields of Grant, Talbotville, and Crooked River. The Post Office opened on 18 March 1868.

Today the town is a producer of timber and beef cattle, and outside these industries tourism has become a major source of revenue. The town is a popular destination for four-wheel drive enthusiasts, bushwalkers, sambar deer hunters, and trout fishermen. An annual Walnut Festival formerly ran through the Australian Easter holiday period and was usually well attended.

== Geography ==
=== Climate ===
Dargo experiences an elevation-influenced oceanic climate (Köppen: Cfb) with tepid summers and cool winters. The wettest recorded day was 5 June 2012 with 160.2 mm (6.31 in) of rainfall. Extreme temperatures ranged from 43.7 °C (110.7 °F) on 25 January 2019 to −7.9 °C (17.8 °F) on 4 August 1994.

Climate data was taken from the nearest weather station at Mount Moornapa.

Climate data for Mount Moornapa (37.75°S 147.14°E) (480 m (1,570 ft) AMSL) (1993-2025)
Month	Jan	Feb	Mar	Apr	May	Jun	Jul	Aug	Sep	Oct	Nov	Dec	Year
Record high °C (°F)	43.7 (110.7)	43.2 (109.8)	39.4 (102.9)	33.6 (92.5)	25.4 (77.7)	22.0 (71.6)	22.4 (72.3)	27.5 (81.5)	33.0 (91.4)	34.5 (94.1)	39.5 (103.1)	42.1 (107.8)	43.7 (110.7)
Mean daily maximum °C (°F)	25.5 (77.9)	24.6 (76.3)	22.2 (72.0)	18.4 (65.1)	15.0 (59.0)	12.4 (54.3)	12.3 (54.1)	13.8 (56.8)	16.5 (61.7)	18.9 (66.0)	21.2 (70.2)	23.3 (73.9)	18.7 (65.6)
Mean daily minimum °C (°F)	13.4 (56.1)	13.4 (56.1)	12.1 (53.8)	10.0 (50.0)	7.9 (46.2)	6.0 (42.8)	5.3 (41.5)	5.7 (42.3)	7.0 (44.6)	8.3 (46.9)	10.0 (50.0)	11.4 (52.5)	9.2 (48.6)
Record low °C (°F)	5.6 (42.1)	6.3 (43.3)	5.2 (41.4)	2.0 (35.6)	−3.8 (25.2)	−7.0 (19.4)	−0.4 (31.3)	−7.9 (17.8)	−4.2 (24.4)	0.4 (32.7)	0.2 (32.4)	2.7 (36.9)	−7.9 (17.8)
Average precipitation mm (inches)	80.4 (3.17)	71.5 (2.81)	66.3 (2.61)	78.1 (3.07)	47.0 (1.85)	92.1 (3.63)	60.3 (2.37)	50.7 (2.00)	54.0 (2.13)	86.5 (3.41)	113.4 (4.46)	72.7 (2.86)	874.3 (34.42)
Average precipitation days (≥ 0.2 mm)	11.1	10.4	10.3	12.2	12.7	14.1	13.7	14.0	12.7	13.8	13.3	11.4	149.7
Average afternoon relative humidity (%)	50	57	55	62	71	71	68	61	59	58	57	53	60
Average dew point °C (°F)	10.9 (51.6)	12.3 (54.1)	10.1 (50.2)	8.7 (47.7)	7.6 (45.7)	5.8 (42.4)	4.5 (40.1)	4.1 (39.4)	5.4 (41.7)	6.9 (44.4)	9.1 (48.4)	9.8 (49.6)	7.9 (46.3)
Source: Bureau of Meteorology (1993-2025)

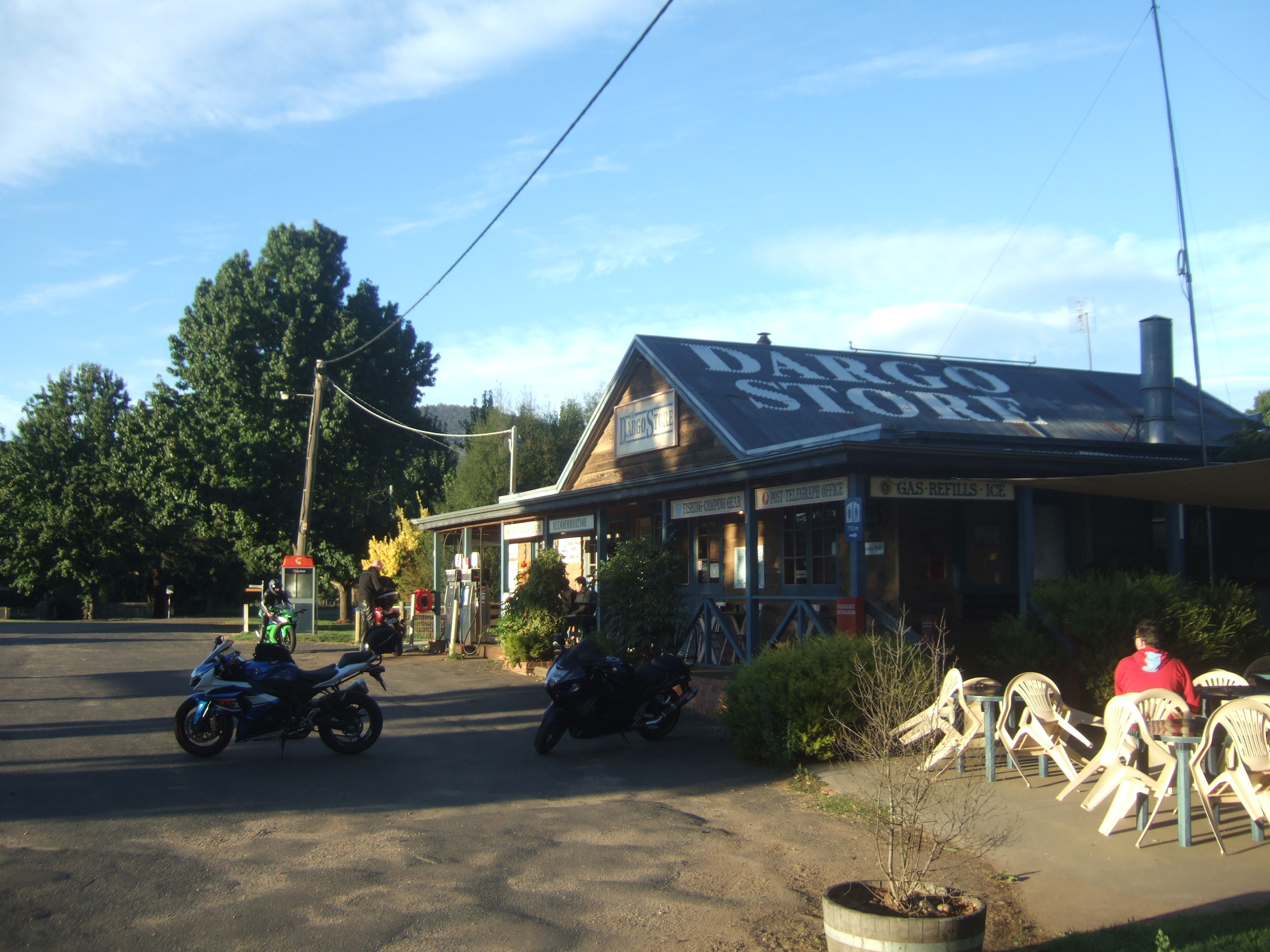
The Dargo Store, an important refuel and resupply point.

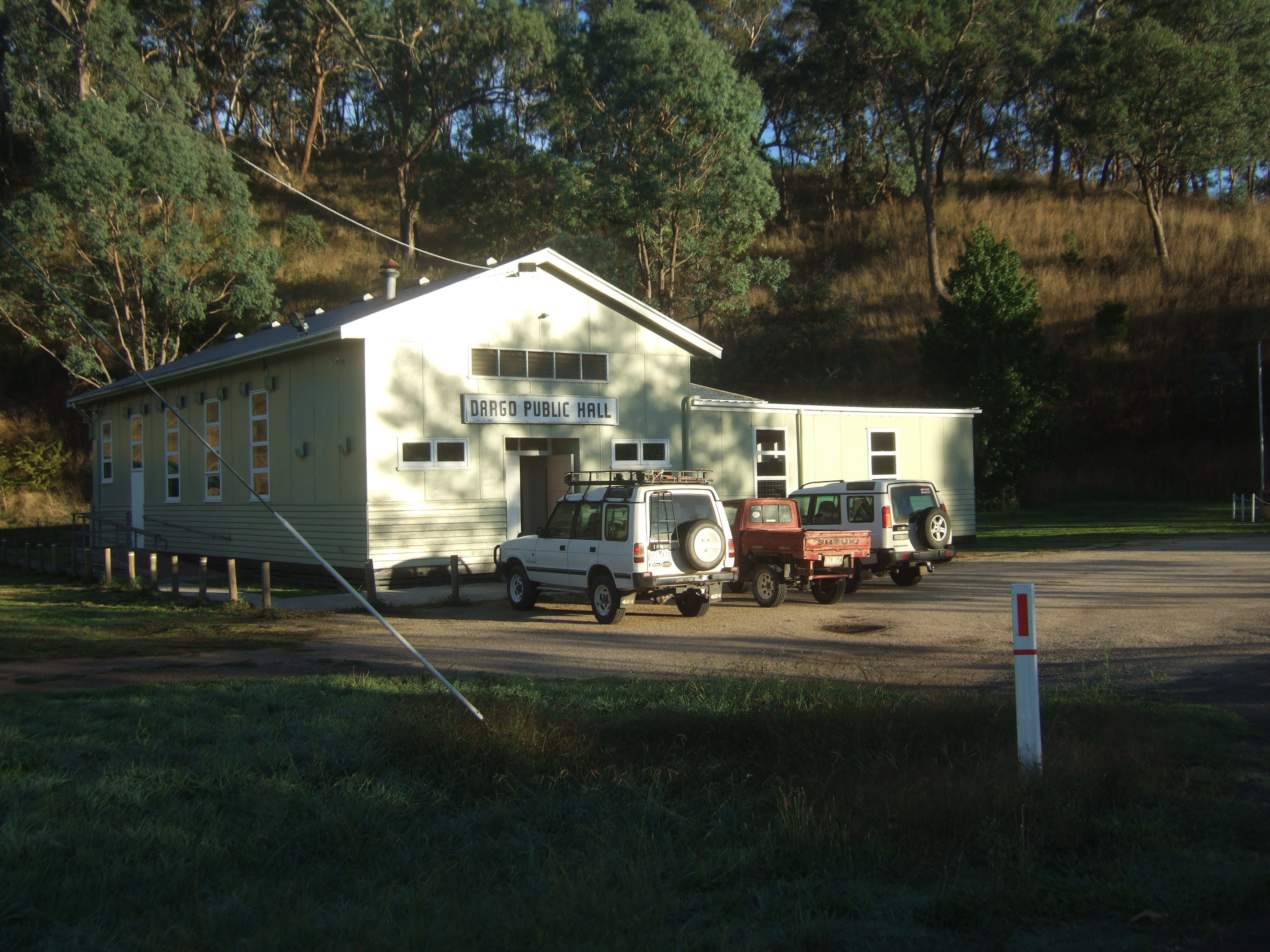
The Dargo Community Hall.

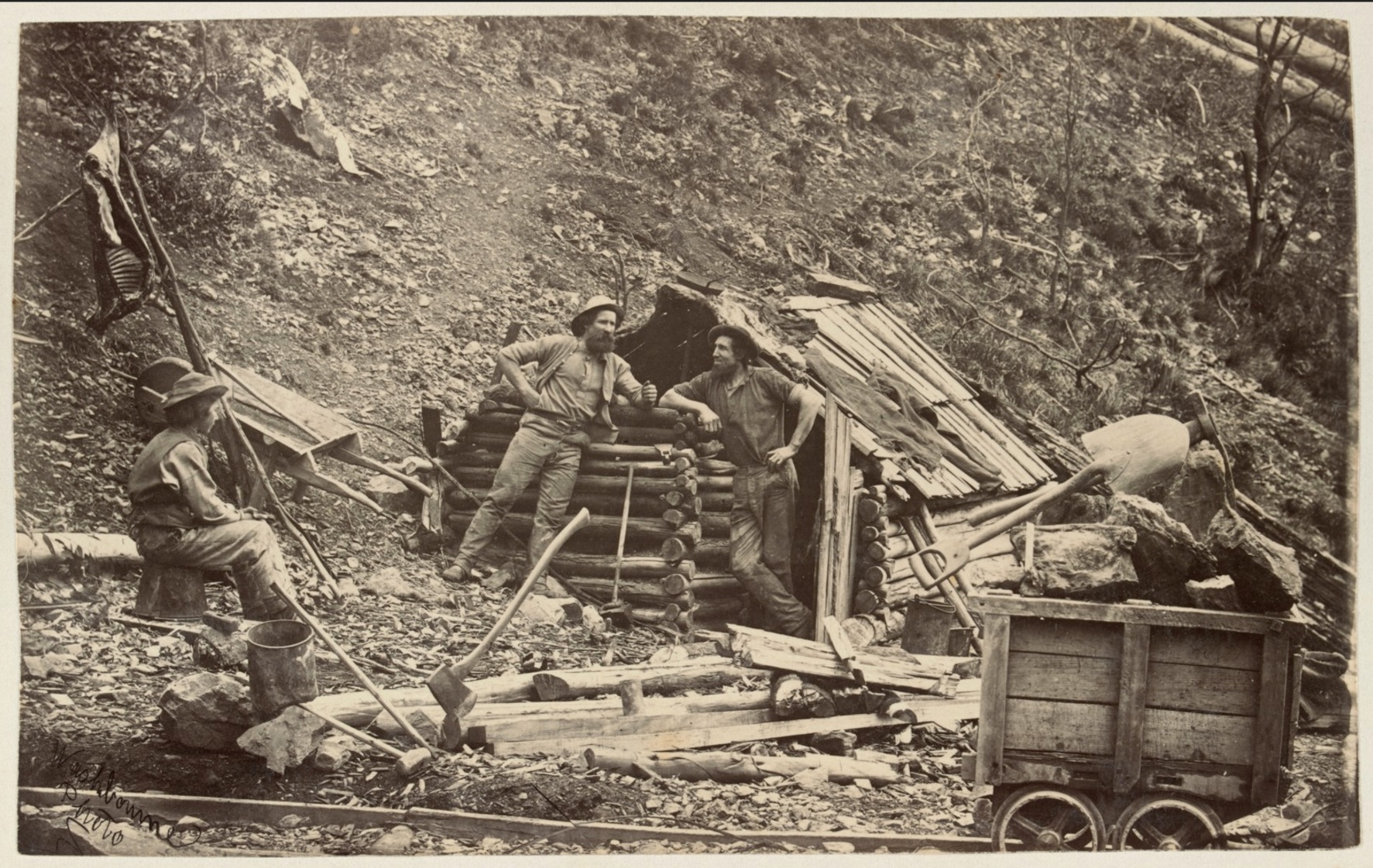
Prospector's hut Upper Dargo, 1870
