= Worondi Rivulet =

Coordinates: 32°22′S 150°29′E

Worondi Rivulet Chinamans Gully

Location
- Country: Australia
- State: New South Wales
- Region: NSW North Coast (IBRA), Upper Hunter
- Local government area: Upper Hunter

Physical characteristics
- Source: Great Dividing Range
  - location: east of Terragong and northeast of Merriwa
  - elevation: 463 m (1,519 ft)
- Mouth: confluence with Goulburn River
  - location: west of Sandy Hollow, within Goulburn River National Park
  - elevation: 133 m (436 ft)
- Length: 45 km (28 mi)

Basin features
- River system: Hunter River catchment
- Tributaries
  - right: Wappinguy Creek
- National park: Goulburn River NP

Worondi Rivulet, a perennial stream of the Hunter River catchment, is located in the Upper Hunter region of New South Wales, Australia.

== Course and features ==
Worondi Rivulet rises on the slopes of the Great Dividing Range, east of Terragong and northeast of Merriwa. The river flows generally south by west and then southeast, joined by one minor tributary before reaching its confluence with the Goulburn River, west of Sandy Hollow within Goulburn River National Park. The river descends 330 metres (1,080 ft) over its 45 kilometres (28 mi) course.

== See also ==
- Rivers of New South Wales
