= Bow River (New South Wales) =

Bow River Bow Creek

Location
- Country: Australia
- State: New South Wales
- Region: Sydney Basin (IBRA), Upper Hunter
- Local government area: Upper Hunter

Physical characteristics
- Source
  - location: near Galla Gilla Mountain
  - coordinates: 32.00652°S 150.29986°E
- Mouth: Goulburn River
  - location: west of Denman
  - coordinates: 32.31881°S 150.20844°E
  - elevation: 192 m (630 ft)
- Length: 38 km (24 mi)

Basin features
- Progression: Goulburn → Hunter → Tasman Sea
- River system: Hunter River catchment
- Tributaries
  - right: Killoe Creek, Councils Creek, Redlynch Creek
- National park: Goulburn River NP

Bow River, a partly perennial stream of the Hunter River catchment, is located in the Hunter district of New South Wales, Australia.

== Course ==
Bow River rises below Galla Gilla Mountain and is formed by the confluence of Bobialla Creek and Spring Creek, near the village of Bow, west of Merriwa, and flows generally south southwest, southeast, and south, joined by three minor tributaries, before reaching its confluence with the Goulburn River within Goulburn River National Park, west of Denman. Bow River descends 150 metres (490 ft) over its 38 kilometres (24 mi) course.

== See also ==
- List of rivers of Australia
- List of rivers of New South Wales (A–K)
- Rivers of New South Wales
