= Merriwa River =

Coordinates: 32°06′S 150°22′E

Merriwa River Smiths Rivulet, Merriwa Creek, Middle Creek, Harrys Creek
- Etymology: Aboriginal: "grass seeds"

Location
- Country: Australia
- State: New South Wales
- Region: NSW North Coast (IBRA), Upper Hunter
- Local government area: Upper Hunter
- Town: Merriwa

Physical characteristics
- Source: Great Dividing Range
  - location: Oxleys Peak
  - elevation: 475 m (1,558 ft)
- Mouth: confluence with the Goulburn River
  - location: below Mount Kerrabee
  - elevation: 158 m (518 ft)
- Length: 78 km (48 mi)

Basin features
- River system: Hunter River catchment
- Tributaries
  - left: Coulsons Creek, Butchers Swamp Creek, Vallances Creek, Horse Creek (New South Wales), Kittens Creek
  - right: Gummum Creek, Farm Springs Creek, Scrubby Creek
- National park: Goulburn River NP

Merriwa River, a perennial river of the Hunter River catchment, is located in the Upper Hunter region of New South Wales, Australia.

== Course and features ==
Merriwa River rises on the southern slopes of the Great Dividing Range, below Oxleys Peak, north of Merriwa and flows generally south, joined by eight minor tributaries before reaching its confluence with the Goulburn River below Mount Kerrabee. The river descends 317 metres (1,040 ft) over its 78 kilometres (48 mi) course.

At the town of Merriwa, the Golden Highway crosses the Merriwa River.

Merriwa is thought to be derived from the Aboriginal word meaning "grass seeds."

== See also ==
- Rivers of New South Wales
- List of rivers of New South Wales (L–Z)
- List of rivers of Australia
- Goulburn River National Park
