= Munmurra River =

River in New South Wales, Australia

Coordinates: 32°09′S 150°01′E

Munmurra River Munmurra Brook

Location
- Country: Australia
- State: New South Wales
- Region: NSW North Coast (IBRA), Upper Hunter
- Local government area: Upper Hunter

Physical characteristics
- Source: Great Dividing Range
  - location: Breeza Lookout
  - elevation: 1,160 m (3,810 ft)
- Mouth: confluence with the Goulburn River
  - location: near Comiala Flat
  - elevation: 279 m (915 ft)
- Length: 74 km (46 mi)

Basin features
- River system: Hunter River catchment
- Tributaries
  - left: Peters Creek (New South Wales), Borambil Creek
  - right: Cattle Creek (Eastern Brook), Cooba Bulga Stream
- National park: Goulburn River NP

Munmurra River, a perennial river of the Hunter River catchment, is located in the Upper Hunter region of New South Wales, Australia.

== Course and features ==
Munmurra River rises on the southern slopes of the Great Dividing Range, below Breeza Lookout, northeast of Cassilis and flows generally south by west, joined by four minor tributaries before reaching its confluence with the Goulburn River. The river descends 876 metres (2,874 ft) over its 74 kilometres (46 mi) course.

South of the town of Cassilis, the Golden Highway crosses the Munmurra River.

== See also ==
- List of rivers of Australia
- List of rivers of New South Wales (L–Z)
- Goulburn River National Park
- Rivers of New South Wales
