= Cattle Creek (New South Wales) =

Coordinates: 31°52′S 150°06′E

Cattle Creek Eastern Brook

Location
- Country: Australia
- State: New South Wales
- Region: Sydney Basin (IBRA), Upper Hunter
- Local government area: Upper Hunter

Physical characteristics
- Source: Great Dividing Range
  - location: near Rocky Nob
  - elevation: 1,130 m (3,710 ft)
- Mouth: confluence with the Munmurra River
  - location: northeast of Cassilis
  - elevation: 430 m (1,410 ft)
- Length: 26 km (16 mi)

Basin features
- River system: Hunter River catchment

Cattle Creek, a partly perennial stream of the Hunter River catchment, is located in the Hunter region of New South Wales, Australia.

== Course ==
The Cattle Creek rises on the southern slopes of the Great Dividing Range about 1.6 kilometres (0.99 mi) southwest of Rocky Nob. The river flows generally southwest and is joined by the Eastern Brook before reaching its confluence with the Munmurra River northeast of Cassilis. Cattle Creek descends 700 metres (2,300 ft) over its 26 kilometres (16 mi) course.

== See also ==
- List of rivers of Australia
- List of rivers of New South Wales (A-K)
- Rivers of New South Wales
