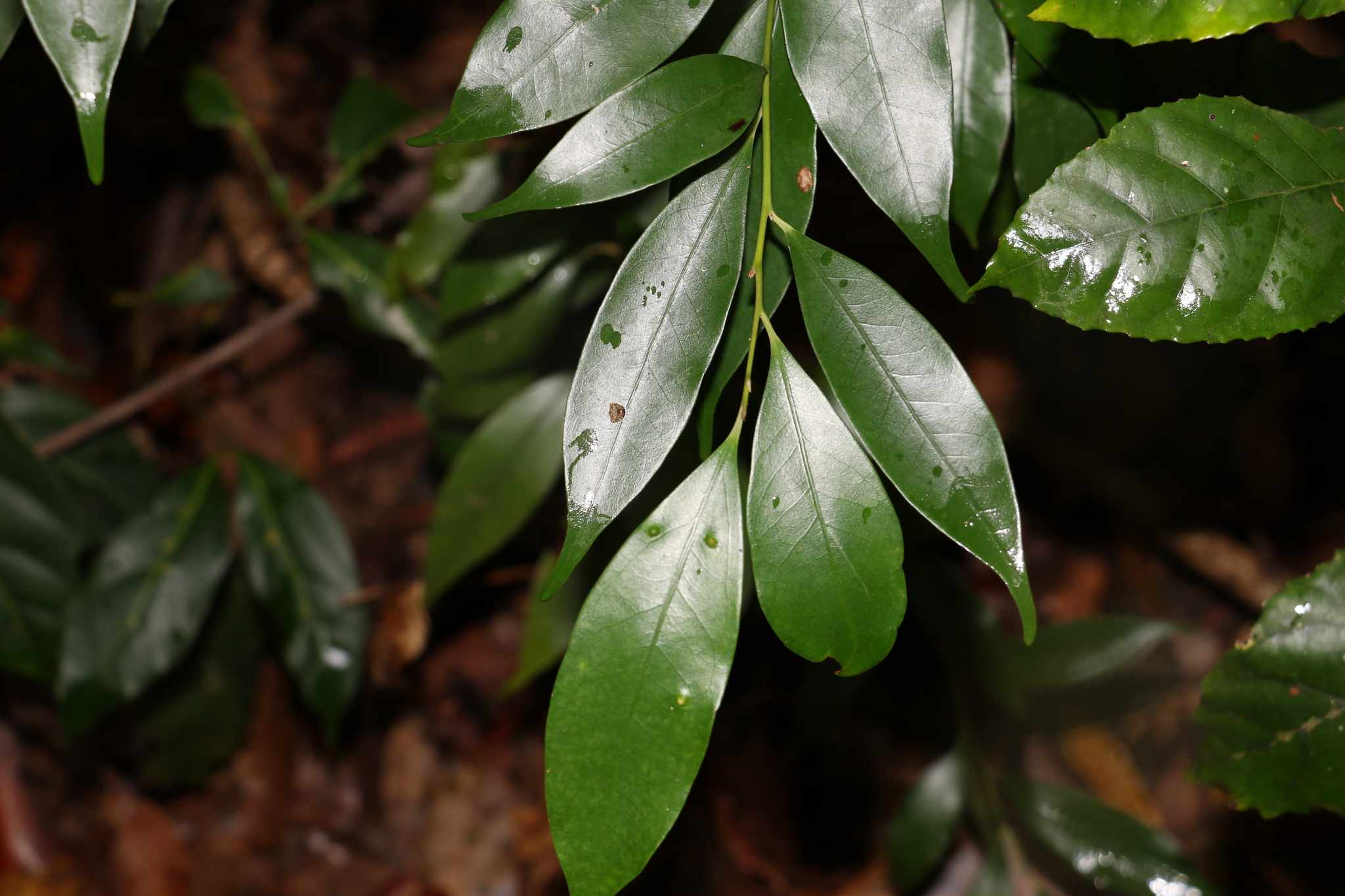

Conservation status
- Least Concern (IUCN 3.1)

Scientific classification
- Kingdom: Plantae
- Clade: Embryophytes
- Clade: Tracheophytes
- Clade: Spermatophytes
- Clade: Angiosperms
- Clade: Magnoliids
- Order: Laurales
- Family: Lauraceae
- Genus: Cryptocarya
- Species: C. meisneriana

Binomial name
- Cryptocarya meisneriana Frodin

= Cryptocarya meisneriana =

Species of flowering plant

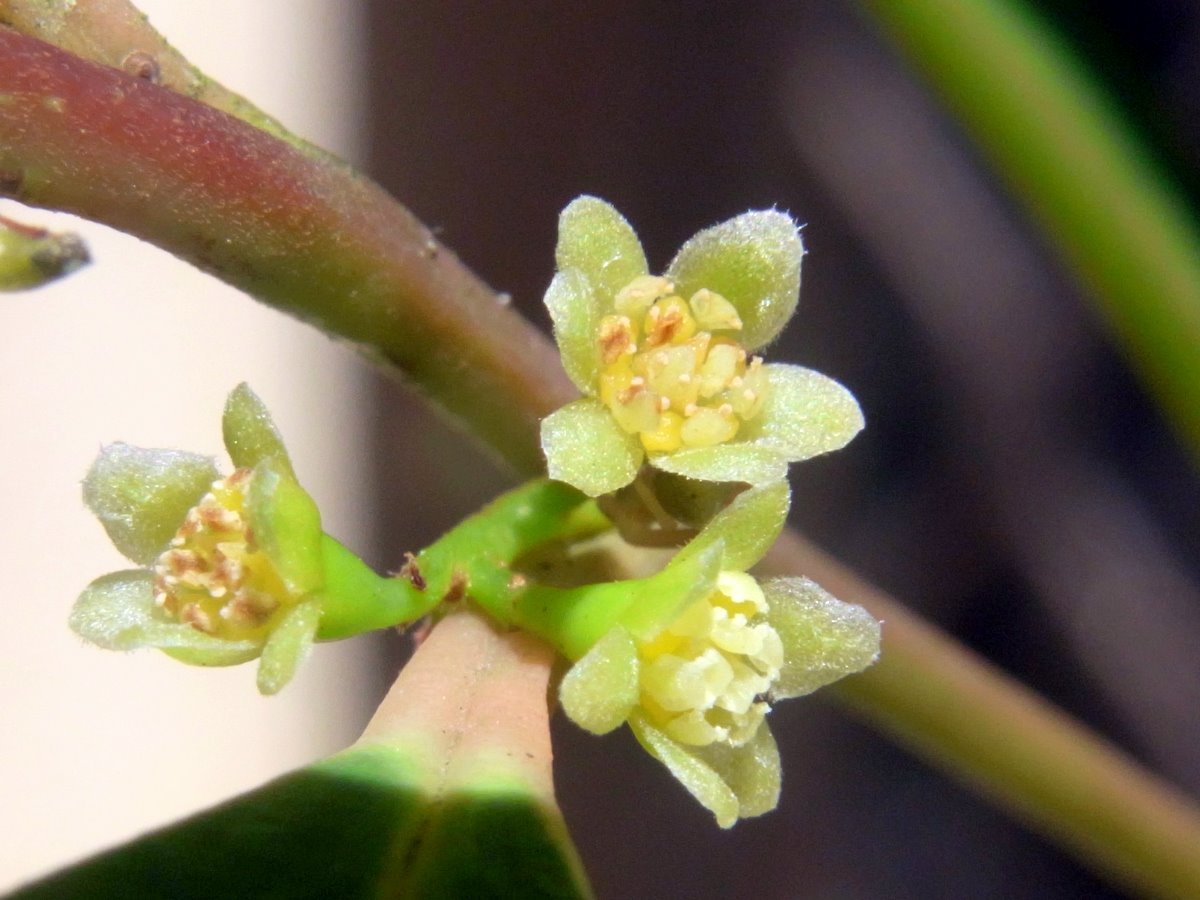
Flowers

Cryptocarya meisneriana, commonly known as northern rivers laurel, thick-leaved cryptocarya, Meisner's laurel or thick-leaved laurel, is a species of flowering plant in the family Lauraceae and is endemic to eastern Australia. It is a tree or shrub with lance-shaped leaves, creamy and pale green, perfumed flowers, and elliptic to oval black drupes.

Its habitat is rainforest on poorer sedimentary soils. The natural range of distribution is from the Wangat River (32° S) in the Barrington Tops, New South Wales. to the Logan River (27° S) in southeastern Queensland. This tree was named after Carl Meissner, a Swiss botanist.

== Description ==
Cryptocarya meisneriana is a tree or shrub that typically grows to a height of up to 10 m (33 ft), its stems not buttressed. Its leaves are lance-shaped, 65–85 mm (2.6–3.3 in) long, 19–26 mm (0.7–1.0 in) wide, green and more or less glaucous, on a petiole 6–7 mm (0.24–0.28 in) long. The flowers are arranged in small panicles or racemes in leaf axils about the same length as the petioles. They are cream to pale green and pleasantly perfumed. The perianth tube is 1.1–1.7 mm (0.04–0.07 in) long, 1.1–1.4 mm (0.04–0.06 in) wide. The outer anthers are 0.4–0.6 mm (0.02–0.02 in) long and 0.4–0.5 mm (0.02–0.02 in) wide, the inner anthers 0.4–0.6 mm (0.02–0.02 in) long and 0.4–0.5 mm (0.02–0.02 in) wide. Flowering occurs from October to January, and the fruit is an elliptical to oval black drupe, 14–17 mm (0.6–0.7 in) long and about 12 mm (0.47 in) wide.

== Taxonomy ==
Cryptocarya meisneriana was first formally described in 1976 by David Gamman Frodin in the journal Telopea from specimens collected near the Hastings River near Port Macquarie by Hermann Beckler.

== Distribution and habitat ==
This species of Cryptocarya grows in rainforest on coastal ranges from sea level to 600 to 900 m (2,000 to 3,000 ft) elevation from Springbrook in southern Queensland to Gloucester in New South Wales.

== Conservation status ==
Cryptocarya meisneriana is listed as of "least concern" by the Queensland Government Department of Education and Science.
