= Colonial Cottage Museum, Merriwa =

Colonial Cottage Museum
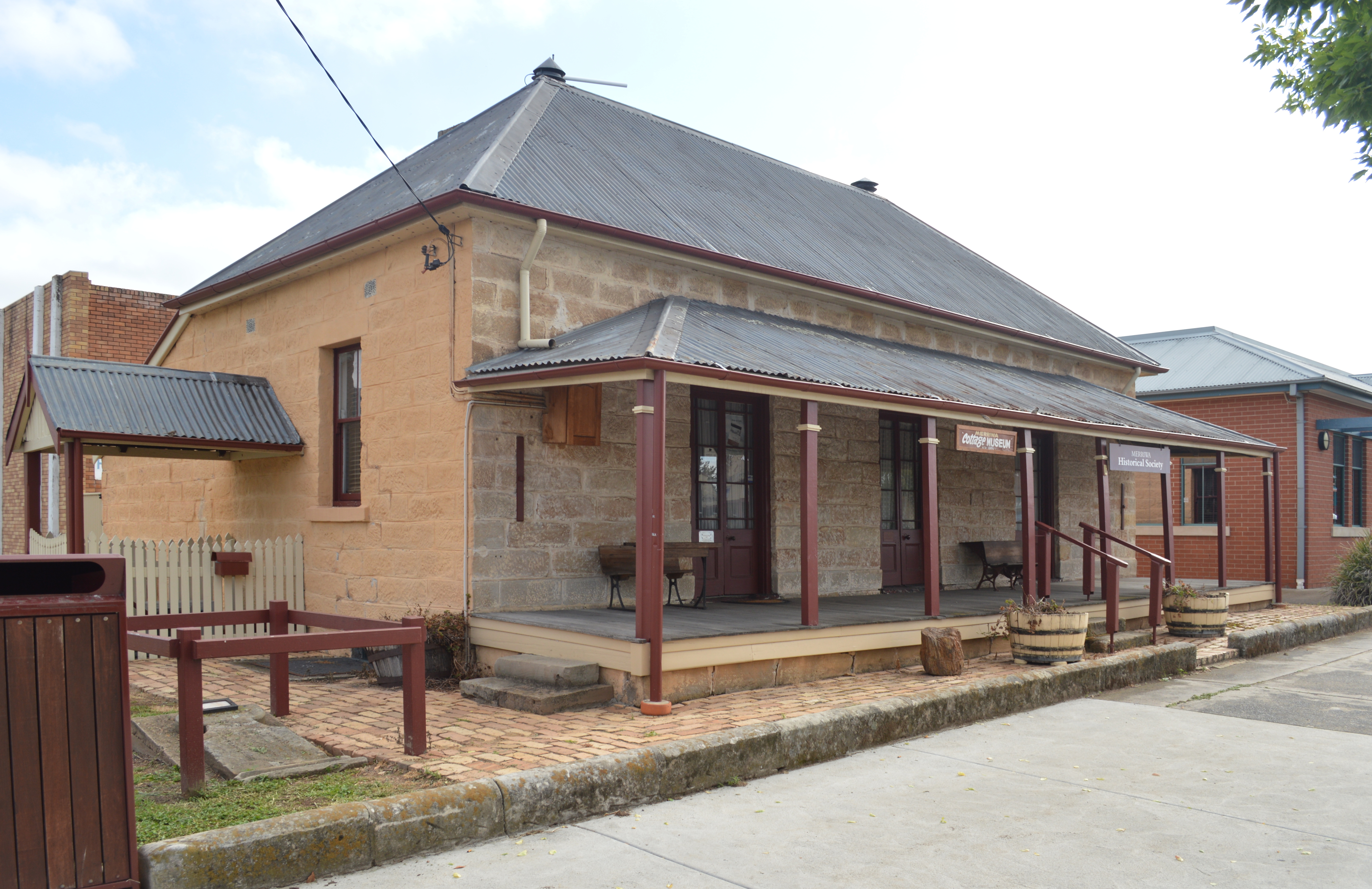
- The Colonial Cottage Museum, in 2017

- Location within New South Wales Location within Australia
- 32°08′20″S 150°21′13″E
- Location: Bow Street, Merriwa, Upper Hunter Shire, New South Wales, Australia

History
- Built: 1847 – 1856

Site notes
- Owner: Upper Hunter Shire Council

New South Wales Heritage Register
- Official name: Cottage Museum; Merriwa Cottage
- Type: State heritage (built)
- Designated: 2 April 1999
- Reference no.: 259
- Type: historic site

The Colonial Cottage Museum is a heritage-listed former cottage and now museum at Bow Street, Merriwa, in the Hunter Region of New South Wales, Australia. It is also known as Merriwa Cottage and Cottage Museum. The property is owned by the Upper Hunter Shire Council and was added to the New South Wales State Heritage Register on 2 April 1999.

== History ==
The cottage was built between 1847 and 1856 as a private residence. The cottage was made from local sandstone quarried that was pushed down on timber slabs. The cottage served as a series of banking businesses until the 1950s when it became a private residence. The original building consisted of four rooms, a cellar area and a separate kitchen at the rear of the building, since removed.

== Heritage listing ==
The Colonial Cottage Museum was listed on the New South Wales State Heritage Register on 2 April 1999.

== See also ==
- List of museums in New South Wales
