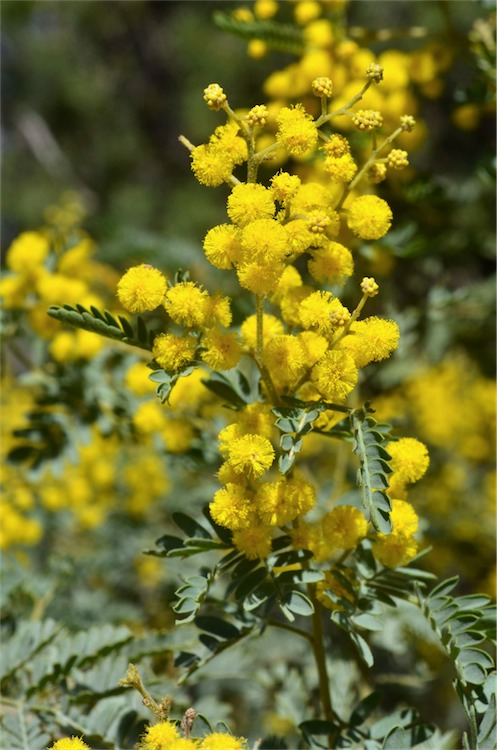

Scientific classification
- Kingdom: Plantae
- Clade: Embryophytes
- Clade: Tracheophytes
- Clade: Spermatophytes
- Clade: Angiosperms
- Clade: Eudicots
- Clade: Rosids
- Order: Fabales
- Family: Fabaceae
- Subfamily: Caesalpinioideae
- Clade: Mimosoid clade
- Genus: Acacia
- Species: A. polybotrya

Binomial name
- Acacia polybotrya Benth.
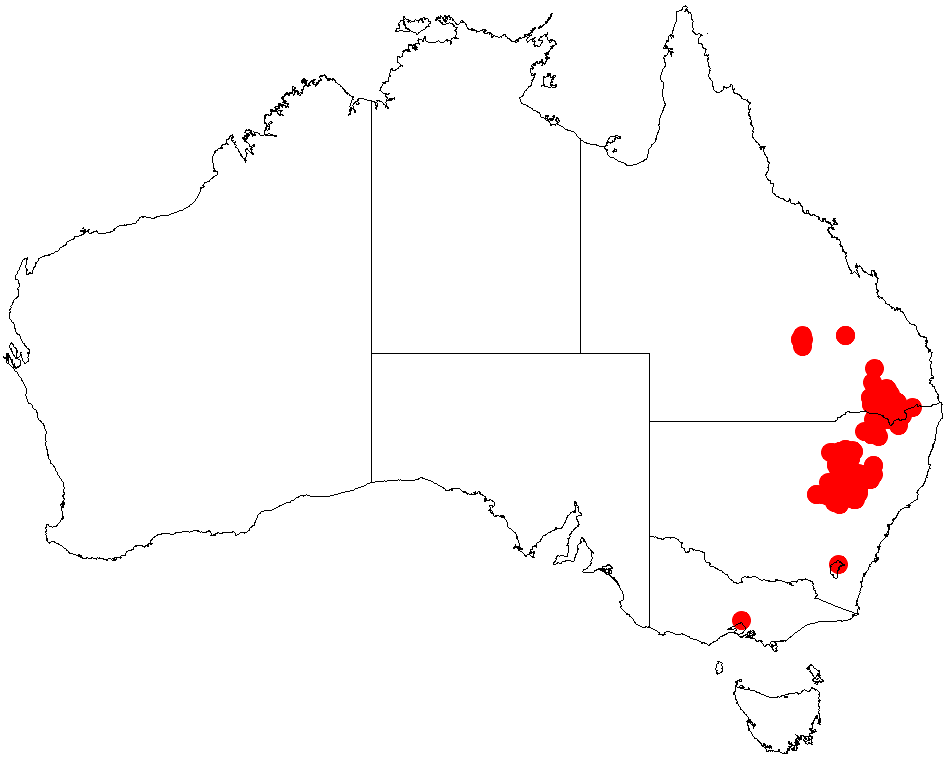
- Occurrence data from AVH

= Acacia polybotrya =

Western silver wattle

Species of legume

Acacia polybotrya, commonly known the western silver wattle or the hairy feather wattle, is a shrub of the genus Acacia and the subgenus Botrycephalae. It is native to an area in New South Wales and Queensland.

== Description ==
The spreading shrub typically grows to a height of 1 to 5 metres (3 to 16 ft) and has multiple stems with a flat topped habit. It has smooth greenish to gray coloured bark and terete, glabrous or lightly haired branchlets. The blue-green subcoriaceous filiform leaves have a rachis with a length of 0.5 to 3 cm (0.20 to 1.18 in) that hold two to four pairs of pinnae that are 1 to 4.5 cm (0.39 to 1.77 in) in length that are composed of 4 to 12 pairs of pinnules that have a lanceolate or obovate shape and are 4 to 10 mm (0.16 to 0.39 in) long and 1.5 to 3 mm (0.059 to 0.118 in) wide. It flowers from August to November producing yellow inflorescences. The simple inflorescences are found in groups of 3 to 25 in a panicle or along an axillary raceme along an axis with a length of 1 to 8 cm (0.39 to 3.15 in). The spherical flower-heads have a diameter of 4 to 7 mm (0.16 to 0.28 in) and contain 20 to 35 bright yellow flowers. After flowering thinly leathery seed pods form that are straight or curved and often twisted. The pods are constricted between each of the seeds and have a length of 4 to 11.5 cm (1.6 to 4.5 in) long and 4 to 8 mm (0.16 to 0.31 in) wide and covered in a white powdery coating.

== Taxonomy ==
The species was first formally described by the botanist George Bentham in 1842 as a part of William Jackson Hooker's work Notes on Mimoseae, with a synopsis of species as published in the London Journal of Botany. It was reclassified as Racosperma polybotryum by Leslie Pedley in 1987 then transferred back to genus Acacia in 2001. The only other synonyms are Acacia polybotrya var. typica and Acacia polybotrya var. polybotrya.

== Distribution ==
It is endemic from south eastern Queensland from the southern portion of the Darling Downs district and the range extends south to the central western slopes and north western plains of New South Wales as far south as Munghorn Gap Nature Reserve where it is found in a variety of habitat growing in infertile rocky, sandy or gravelly clay soils as a part of open Eucalyptus woodlands or in shrubland communities.

== See also ==
- List of Acacia species
