= Krui River =

Coordinates: 32°12′S 150°05′E

Location
- Country: Australia
- State: New South Wales
- Region: NSW North Coast (IBRA), Upper Hunter
- Local government area: Upper Hunter

Physical characteristics
- Source: Great Dividing Range
  - location: Oxleys Peak, at Mount Palmer
  - elevation: 831 m (2,726 ft)
- Mouth: confluence with the Goulburn River
  - location: near Comiala Flat
  - elevation: 264 m (866 ft)
- Length: 71 km (44 mi)

Basin features
- River system: Hunter River catchment
- Tributaries
  - left: Dry Creek (Krui River), Ginghi Creek (Krui River)
  - right: Lorimer Creek, Berenderry (Jemmys) Creek, Bellaleppa Creek, Willy Wally Creek
- National park: Goulburn River NP

Krui River, a perennial river of the Hunter River catchment, is located in the Upper Hunter region of New South Wales, Australia.

== Course and features ==
Krui River rises on the southern slopes of the Great Dividing Range, below Oxleys Peak, at Mount Palmer and flows generally southwest, joined by six minor tributaries before reaching its confluence with the Goulburn River near Comiala Flat. The river descends 567 metres (1,860 ft) over its 71 kilometres (44 mi) course.

Near the village of Collaroy, the Golden Highway crosses the Krui River.

== See also ==
- Rivers of New South Wales
- List of rivers of New South Wales (A–K)
- List of rivers of Australia
- Goulburn River National Park
