= Cooba Bulga Stream =

Coordinates: 31°57′S 150°02′E

Location
- Country: Australia
- State: New South Wales
- Region: Sydney Basin (IBRA), Upper Hunter
- Local government area: Upper Hunter

Physical characteristics
- Source: Liverpool Range, Great Dividing Range
  - location: south of Omaleah Cliffs
  - elevation: 1,200 m (3,900 ft)
- Mouth: confluence with the Munmurra River
  - location: near Llangolan
  - elevation: 415 m (1,362 ft)
- Length: 31 km (19 mi)

Basin features
- River system: Hunter River catchment

Cooba Bulga Stream, a mostly perennial stream of the Hunter River catchment, is located in the Hunter region of New South Wales, Australia.

== Course ==
Officially designated as a river, the Cooba Bulga Stream rises on the southern slopes of the Liverpool Range within the Great Dividing Range about 1.6 kilometres (0.99 mi) south of Omaleah Cliffs. The river flows generally southwest and then south before reaching its confluence with the Munmurra River near Llangolan. Cooba Bulga Stream descends 786 metres (2,579 ft) over its 31 kilometres (19 mi) course.

== See also ==
- List of rivers of Australia
- List of rivers of New South Wales (A-K)
- Rivers of New South Wales
