= Blackwater Creek (New South Wales) =

Coordinates: 32°45′S 150°28′E

Location
- Country: Australia
- State: New South Wales
- Region: NSW North Coast (IBRA), Hunter
- Local government area: Muswellbrook

Physical characteristics
- Source: Great Dividing Range
  - location: below Mount Coricudgy
  - elevation: 728 m (2,388 ft)
- Mouth: Widden Brook
  - location: south southwest of Denman
  - elevation: 226 m (741 ft)
- Length: 34 km (21 mi)

Basin features
- River system: Hunter River catchment

Blackwater Creek, a perennial stream of the Hunter River catchment, is located in the Hunter region of New South Wales, Australia.

== Course ==
The Blackwater Creek rises below Mount Coricudgy, on the eastern slopes of the Great Dividing Range. The river flows generally northeast and then northwest before reaching its confluence with the Widden Brook in remote country south southwest of Denman. The river descends 502 metres (1,647 ft) over its 34 metres (112 ft) course.

== See also ==
- List of rivers of Australia
- List of rivers of New South Wales (A-K)
- Rivers of New South Wales
