= Redbank Power Station =

Biomass power station in New South Wales, Australia

- Location of the Redbank Power Station in New South Wales, Australia
- Country: Australia
- Location: Warkworth, New South Wales
- Coordinates: 32.580°S 151.072°E
- Status: Awaiting Restart
- Commission date: 2001
- Owner: Verdant Technologies Australia

Thermal power station
- Primary fuel: Biomass

Power generation
- Nameplate capacity: 151 MW

Redbank Power Station is a biomass power station located in Warkworth, in the Hunter Valley of New South Wales, Australia. The station is currently awaiting a restart of operations after converting from its original use as a coal-fired power station. Redbank is unique for its utilisation of circulating fluidised bed technology, the only generator of its kind in Australia. Upon re-fire, the station will operate using 100% biomass at a capacity of 151 MW of electricity.

== History ==
Redbank was first commissioned in 2001 and operated as a coal-fired powered station with one steam driven turbo generator at a capacity of 151 MW of electricity. At the time of commission, the station was promoted as being at the cutting edge of environmental technology, but was criticised by environmentalists for producing more CO_{2} than other types of coal-fired power stations.

=== Initial shutdown ===
On 5 October 2013, Redbank Energy's wholly owned subsidiary Redbank Project was notified by its secured lenders of the appointment of receivers to Redbank Project, Redbank Construction Pty Ltd and the shares in Redbank Project held by Redbank Project Holdco Pty Ltd, with debts of $192 million.

Redbank ceased operations in 2014 and was placed into administration following the failure of Babcock & Brown.

On 17 September 2015 Redbank Energy (REL) announced that its wholly owned subsidiary, Biogreen Energy Pty Ltd (Biogreen), had purchased the land, plant and equipment and water rights owned by Redbank Project for $5 million, but that it intended "to commence the work to raise the funds necessary to recommence the operation of the Redbank Power Station".

On 25 August 2016 Redbank Energy issued the following statement to shareholders via the Australian Securities Exchange. "In response to shareholder enquiries, Redbank Energy Limited (ASX: AEJ) (REL) wishes to provide the following market update. Unfortunately, REL will be removed from the ASX official list on 29 August 2016. The immediate catalyst for delisting will be the non-payment of the 2016/17 ASX annual listing fee, which falls due on 27 August 2016. The reason for REL not paying the 2016/17 ASX listing fee is because REL will automatically be suspended on 9 October 2016 due to continual suspension." Redbank was subsequently delisted from the close of trading on Monday, 29 August 2016 pursuant to Listing rule 17.15.

=== Blockchain mining proposal ===
On 10 April 2018, Fairfax Media announced that the power plant could be restarted in Q1 2019 to provide cheap off-the-grid power for blockchain mining applications. As of 2019, these plans have been discontinued, and there is no intention for blockchain mining to be a part of Redbank moving forward.

=== Verdant Technologies Australia Limited ===
In 2018, Redbank Power Station was purchased by Hunter Energy Limited, which planned to convert the existing plant from coal to biomass. This was done as the first step of a broad strategy the company presented at the time that would eventually lead to a renewable energy complex at the site of the station. In 2021, Hunter Energy Limited rebranded as Verdant Technologies Australia Limited in an effort to reflect new strategies that did not involve the Hunter Valley.

== Fuel ==
=== Coal tailings ===
Redbank was originally designed to burn coal washery tailings, essentially a waste material with relatively low coal content.

=== Biomass ===
Redbank is planned to refire using 100% biomass, with an emphasis being placed on waste-biomass. This method uses wood processing debris that is otherwise unusable, such as branches and bark that are byproducts produced during sawmill production of commercial timber. Biomass is considered a renewable energy source in Australia, and is accepted as a valid method of reducing carbon emissions within the country.

== Expansion plans ==
=== Redbank Renewable Energy Park ===
Verdant Technologies announced plans in 2021 to create a renewable energy park at the site of the Redbank Power Station. The planned expansion will incorporate a 50 MW Battery Facility and a 40 MW Solar Farm. These additions are planned to tie-in with the existing power generation being conducted at the original biomass facility currently present.

=== Hydrogen ===
In 2021, Verdant Technologies announced its acquisition of Monarch Hydrogen, which possessed the experience and technology needed for the creation of renewable hydrogen. The acquisition is planned to facilitate the introduction of a hydrogen production facility on the same site as Redbank Power Station. If successful, the site would be the largest producer of renewable hydrogen on the East Coast of Australia, with a planned production of 6.5 tonnes/day of compressed hydrogen by 2022.

== Environmental effects ==
Redbank was the focus of environmental concerns during its initial planning and construction.

The first stage of the Redbank project was taken to the land and environment court in 1994 over claims by environmentalists that it did not meet its own standards. The claim was dismissed by the court.

According to Carbon Monitoring for Action, in 2007 Redbank emitted more climate change and global warming causing greenhouse gases per unit of electricity generated than any other power station in Australia. CARMA estimates this power station emits 1.06 million tonnes of greenhouse gases each year as a result of burning coal.
