= Goulburn River (New South Wales) =

River in New South Wales, Australia

Goulburn River Reedy Creek
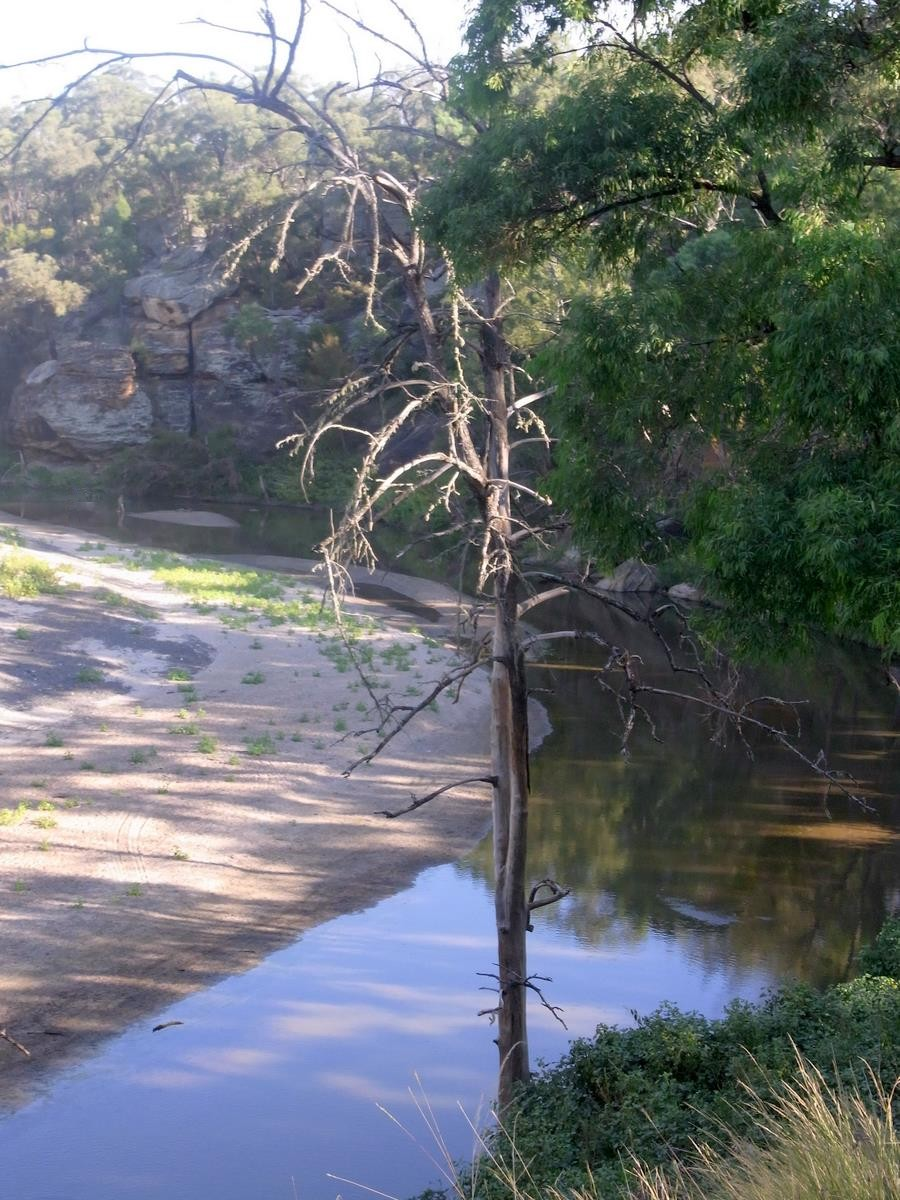
- Goulburn River at Goulburn River National Park
- Etymology: In honour of Henry Goulburn

Location
- Country: Australia
- State: New South Wales
- Region: NSW North Coast (IBRA), Upper Hunter
- Local government area: Mid-Western Regional

Physical characteristics
- Source: Great Dividing Range
  - coordinates: 32.282575°S 149.743461°E
- Source confluence: Moolarben Creek and Sportsmans Hollow Creek
  - location: near Ulan
  - elevation: 434 m (1,424 ft)
- Mouth: confluence with the Hunter River
  - location: south Denman
  - elevation: 97 m (318 ft)
- Length: 221 km (137 mi)

Basin features
- River system: Hunter River catchment
- Tributaries
  - left: Munmurra River, Krui River, Poggy Creek, Tunbridge Creek, Bow River, Merriwa River, Eckfords Creek, Worondi Rivulet, Giants Creek, Wybong Creek
  - right: Wollar Creek, Rocky Creek (New South Wales), Bylong River, Mount Misery Creek, Honeysuckle Creek (New South Wales), Kerrabee Creek, Quarry Creek, Widden Brook, Baerami Creek, Kings Creek (New South Wales)
- National parks: Goulburn River NP

Goulburn River, a perennial river of the Hunter River catchment, is located in the Upper Hunter region of New South Wales, Australia.

== Course and features ==
Goulburn River rises at the confluence of Moolarben Creek and Sportsmans Hollow Creek, on the eastern slopes of the Great Dividing Range, near the village of Ulan, east of Mudgee and flows generally eastward, joined by twenty-one tributaries including the Munmurra, Krui, Bylong, Bow, and Merriwa rivers and Worondi Rivulet. The river reaches its confluence with the Hunter River, south of Denman. The majority of the course of the river flows through the Goulburn River National Park. The river descends 337 metres (1,106 ft) over its 221 kilometres (137 mi) course.

== Etymology ==
William Lawson explored the area in 1823. Goulburn River was named in honour of Henry Goulburn, a British politician in the 1820s.

== See also ==
- Rivers of New South Wales
- List of rivers of New South Wales (A–K)
- List of rivers of Australia
- Goulburn River National Park
