= Mudgee-Wollar Important Bird Area =

Important Bird Area in New South Wales, Australia

Coordinates: 32°21′16″S 149°54′44″E

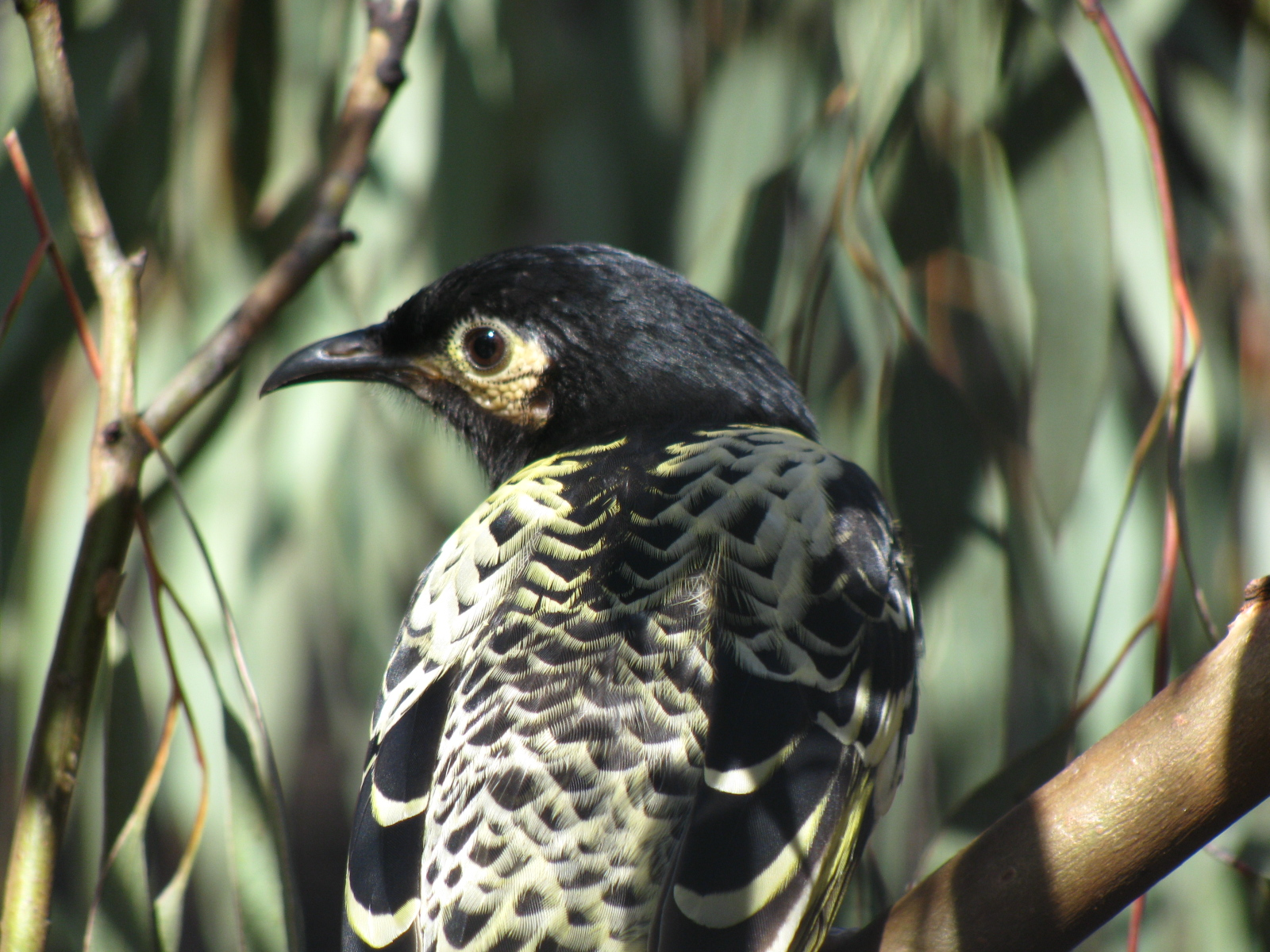
The IBA is an important site for regent honeyeaters

Mudgee-Wollar Important Bird Area is a 1627 km^{2} tract of land in the Central West region of New South Wales, Australia. It lies about 250 km west of Sydney, extending eastwards from the towns of Mudgee and Gulgong, and encompassing the town of Wollar. At its eastern end it adjoins the Greater Blue Mountains Important Bird Area (IBA).

== Description ==
The IBA consists of, and is defined by, woodland remnants used by regent honeyeaters. It includes the Goulburn River National Park and the Munghorn Gap Nature Reserve as well as private land. The area experiences average daily temperatures ranging from 2-13 °C in winter to 15-30 °C in summer, with an average annual rainfall of 620 mm.

== Birds ==
The area has been identified by BirdLife International as an IBA because it regularly supports endangered regent honeyeaters, as well as small numbers of diamond firetails, and rockwarblers in the north-westernmost part of their range.
