= Chichester Dam =

Dam in Dungog, New South Wales, Australia

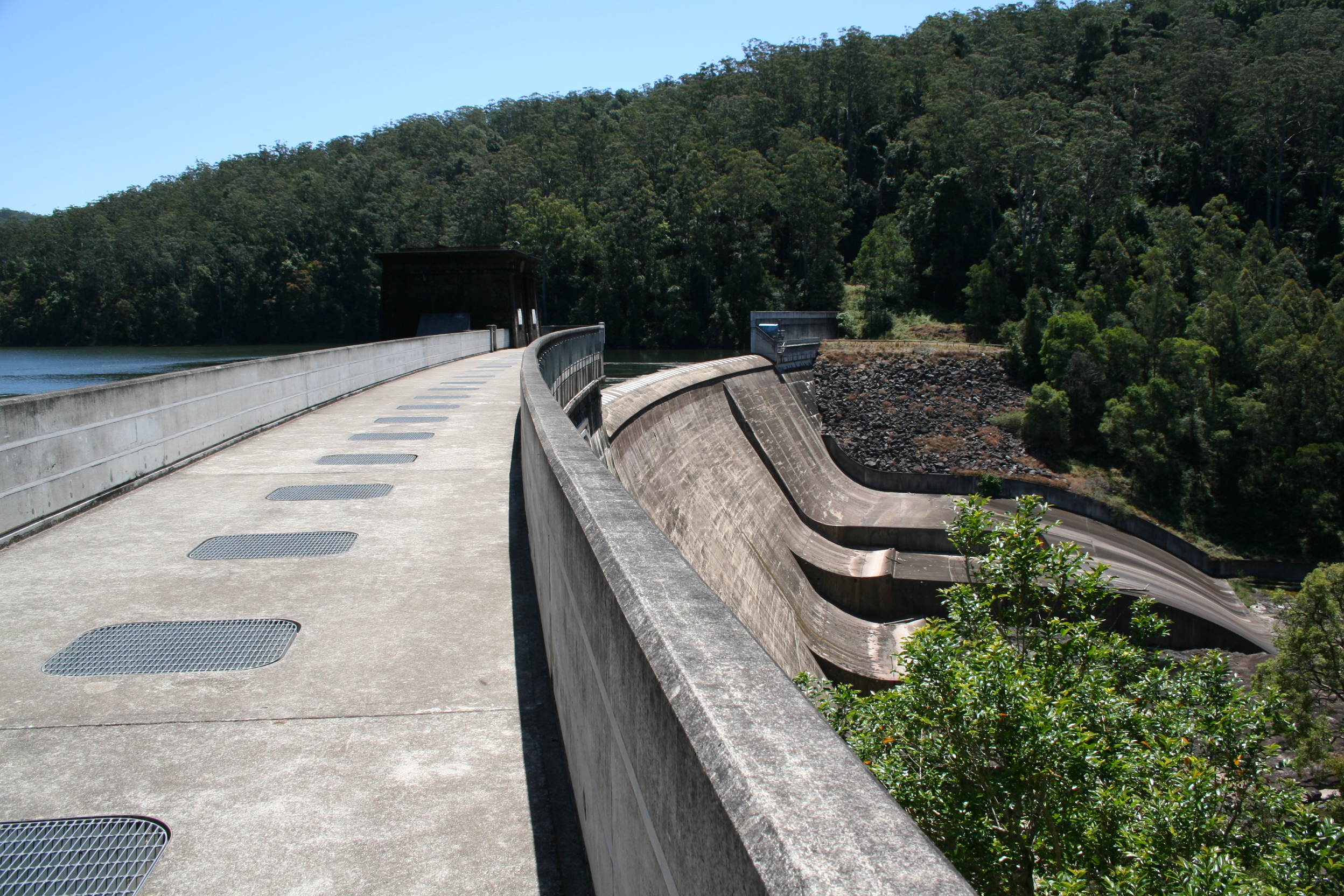
- Chichester Dam

- Location in New South Wales
- Interactive map of Chichester Dam
- Country: Australia
- Location: Dungog, New South Wales
- Coordinates: 32°13′54″S 151°41′04″E
- Purpose: Water supply
- Status: Operational
- Construction began: 1917
- Opening date: 1926
- Construction cost: A£1,049,000
- Owner: Hunter Water Corporation

Dam and spillways
- Type of dam: Gravity dam
- Impounds: Chichester River, Wangat River
- Height: 43 m (141 ft)
- Length: 254 m (833 ft)
- Dam volume: 18.4 ML (650×10^{3} cu ft)
- Spillway capacity: 3,300 m^{3}/s (120,000 cu ft/s)

Reservoir
- Creates: Lake Chichester
- Total capacity: 21,500 ML (760×10^{6} cu ft)
- Catchment area: 197 km^{2} (76 sq mi)
- Surface area: 1.8 km^{2} (0.69 sq mi)
- Maximum length: 4.22 km (2.62 mi)
- Maximum width: 580 m (1,900 ft)
- Normal elevation: 156.2 m (512 ft) AHD

Power Station
- Operator: Delta Electricity
- Commission date: November 2001
- Type: Conventional
- Turbines: 1
- Installed capacity: 110 kW (150 hp)
- Annual generation: 0.4 GWh (1.4 TJ)
- Website; Chichester Dam at www.hunterwater.com.au

Chichester Dam is a minor concrete gravity dam across the Chichester and Wangat rivers, upstream of Dungog, in the Hunter Region of New South Wales, Australia. The dam's main purpose is water supply for the Lower Hunter region. A mini hydro-electric power station operates at times of peak flow and is connected to the national grid. The impounded reservoir is Lake Chichester.

== Location and features ==
The dam wall is 43 metres (141 ft) high, 254 metres (833 ft) long, and was constructed using a cyclopean system of interlocking concrete blocks and large boulders with a volume of 91 cubic metres (3,200 cu ft). The wall is anchored to the bedrock below it by 93 stressed tendons. At 100% capacity the dam wall holds back 21,500 megalitres (760×10^{6} cu ft) of water at 156.2 metres (512 ft) Australian Height Datum. The spillway is capable of discharging 3,300 cubic metres per second (120,000 cu ft/s). The surface area of the reservoir is 1.8 square kilometres (0.69 sq mi) and the catchment area, largely located within the Barrington Tops National Park, is 197 square kilometres (76 sq mi). The dam is connected to reservoirs in Maitland, Cessnock and Newcastle by an 80-kilometre (50 mi) gravitation main.

=== History ===
Land for the water supply scheme was appropriated in the Gazette of 6 October 1916. To safeguard the purity of the water the populated part of the Wangat Valley, including the old goldmining town of Wangat, and the greater portion of the populated part of the Chichester Valley were resumed. The Act appropriated £A1,049,000 as the estimated cost of construction of the dam, with additional funds set aside for land resumption.

In 1965 the spillway was lowered by 2.75 metres (9 ft 0 in) to increase flood capacity. In 1985 the dam was post tensioned with cables and the spillway was relocated to the centre of the dam and returned to its original height. In 1995 the seepage potential was reduced under the northern abutment and in 2003 an improved drainage system for the dam's foundations was installed and the left parapet wall was raised to prevent overtopping in a major flood.

== Power generation ==
Following a report by the Health Rivers Commission, in 1998 the Minister for Urban Affairs and Planning, Craig Knowles, announced that a small hydro-electric power station would be installed in the Chichester Dam in order to generate electricity, reduce greenhouse emissions and allow surplus power to be sold back to the grid. Completed in 2001 and operated by Delta Electricity, the mini-power station generates up to 110 kilowatts (150 hp) of electricity at times of peak flow; with an average annual generation of 0.4 gigawatt-hours (1.4 TJ).

== See also ==
- List of dams and reservoirs in New South Wales
