= Widden Brook =

River in Australia

Widden Brook Widdin Creek

Location
- Country: Australia
- State: New South Wales
- Region: NSW North Coast (IBRA), Hunter
- Local government area: Muswellbrook
- Locality: Kerrabee

Physical characteristics
- Source: Great Dividing Range
  - location: near Nullo Mountain
  - elevation: 1,050 m (3,440 ft)
- Mouth: Goulburn River
  - location: near Kerrabee
  - coordinates: 32°27′S 150°23′E
  - elevation: 148 m (486 ft)
- Length: 61 km (38 mi)

Basin features
- River system: Hunter River catchment
- Tributaries
  - left: Cadiangullong Creek, Emu Creek (New South Wales)
  - right: Red Creek (New South Wales), Table Bay Creek, Blackwater Creek

Widden Brook, a partly perennial stream of the Hunter River catchment, is located in the Hunter region of New South Wales, Australia.

== Course ==
Officially designated as a river, the Widden Brook rises on the Great Dividing Range, southwest of Nullo Mountain. The river flows generally southeast and north northeast, joined by five minor tributaries including the Blackwater Creek, before reaching its confluence with the Goulburn River about 5 kilometres (3.1 mi) east northeast of the village of Kerrabee. Widden Brook descends 901 metres (2,956 ft) over its 61 kilometres (38 mi) course.

== See also ==
- List of rivers of Australia
- List of rivers of New South Wales (A-K)
- Rivers of New South Wales
