= Munghorn Gap Nature Reserve =

Protected area in New South Wales, Australia

- IUCN category Ia (strict nature reserve)
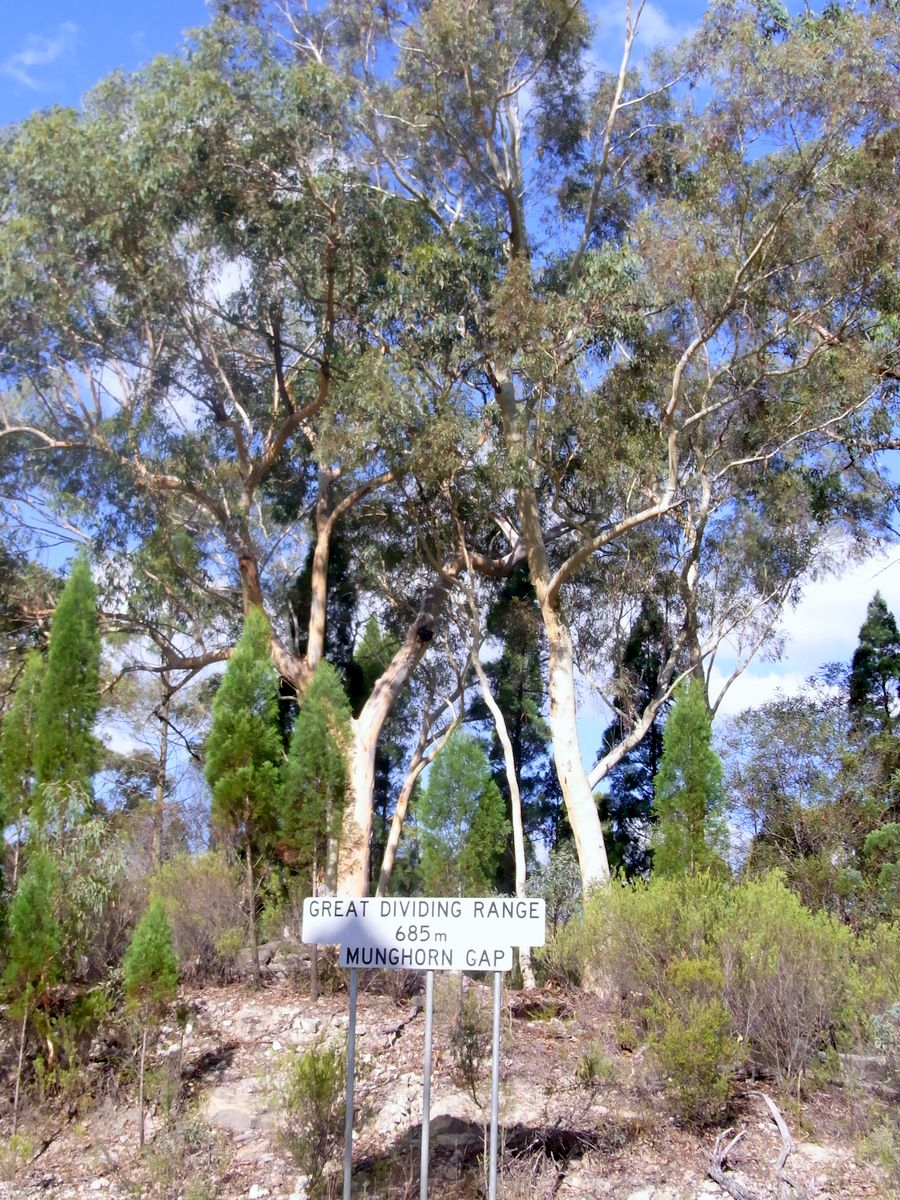
- A sign marking the Munghorn Gap on the Great Dividing Range.

- Location within New South Wales
- Location: New South Wales
- Nearest city: Mudgee
- Coordinates: 32°24′42.3″S 149°49′32.82″E
- Area: 59.34 km^{2} (22.91 sq mi)
- Established: April 1961
- Governing body: NSW National Parks & Wildlife Service
- Website: Official website

The Munghorn Gap Nature Reserve is a protected nature reserve in the Central Tablelands region of New South Wales, in eastern Australia. The 5,934-hectare (14,660-acre) reserve is situated on the Great Dividing Range, 35 kilometres (22 mi) north-east of Mudgee. The Castle Rocks walking trail reveals pagoda-like sandstone formations.

The average elevation of the terrain is 569 meters.

== Flora and fauna ==
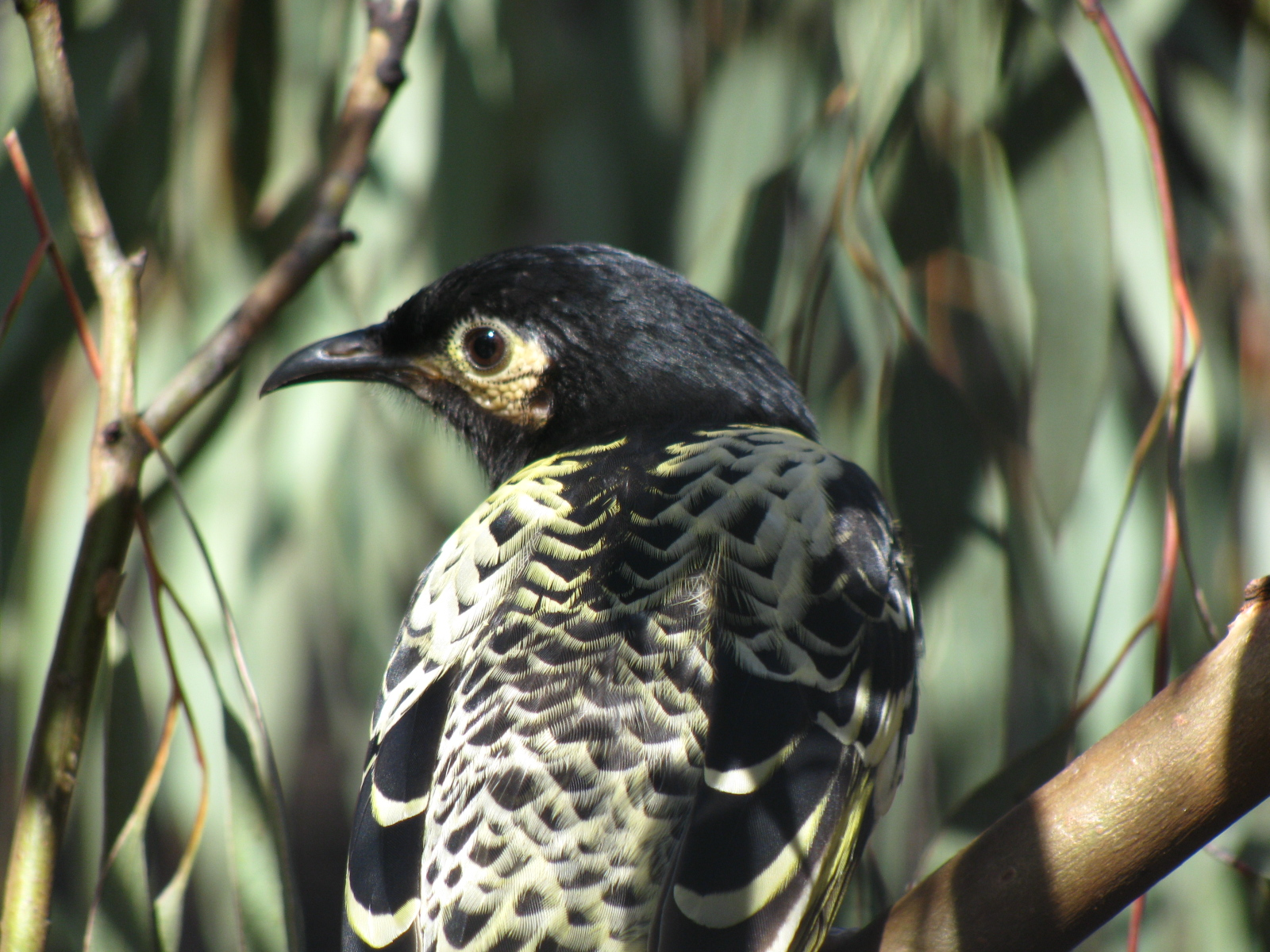
Regent honeyeater

Many plants and animals are at their eastern or westernmost points of natural distribution. The reserve is situated at one of the lowest points of the Great Divide. The streams forming from the east reach the Hunter River, and those from the west eventually flow to the Darling River.

The flora of the area is an interesting combination of the moist mountain plants and those of the drier western plains. Vegetation is mostly dominated by Eucalyptus and Callitris pine.

The reserve is particularly noted for the high bird diversity. It lies within the Mudgee-Wollar Important Bird Area, so identified by BirdLife International because of its importance for the endangered regent honeyeater.

Typical mountain or eastern forest birds such as the superb lyrebird and satin bowerbird are present, as are emus and cockatiels, more usually seen west of the dividing range. Some 164 species of birds have been recorded. Facilities are present for birdwatchers.

== History ==
The western Wiradjuri people traveled through the area, trading with other indigenous Australians east of the divide. Europeans in the 19th century were present. They traveled across the range, on horse and bullock teams. There is also evidence of peat and coal mining, collection of wood, quarrying, prospecting and blacksmithing.

This place stands out with the historical heritage of the Aboriginal people of Wiradjuri.

== See also ==
- Goulburn River National Park
- Protected areas of New South Wales
