= Chichester River =

River in New South Wales, Australia

- Location of the Chichester River mouth in New South Wales

Location
- Country: Australia
- State: New South Wales
- Region: Sydney Basin (IBRA), Upper Hunter
- LGA: Dungog

Physical characteristics
- Source: Chichester Range below Barrington Tops
  - location: east of Careys Peak
  - elevation: 1,330 m (4,360 ft)
- Mouth: Williams River
  - location: Bandon Grove, north northwest of Dungog
  - coordinates: 32°18′S 151°43′E
  - elevation: 82 m (269 ft)
- Length: 42 km (26 mi)

Basin features
- River system: Hunter River catchment
- Tributaries
  - left: Wangat River
- National park: Barrington Tops NP

The Chichester River, a perennial stream of the Hunter River catchment, is located in the Hunter region of New South Wales, Australia.

== Course ==
The Chichester River rises in the Chichester Range below Barrington Tops and east of Careys Peak, and flows generally southeast, joined by the Wangat River, before reaching its confluence with the Williams River at Bandon Grove, north northwest of Dungog. Chichester River descends 1,240 metres (4,070 ft) over its 42 kilometres (26 mi) course.

The river is impounded by Chichester Dam where some of its water is retained for water supply of Newcastle.

== See also ==
- List of rivers of Australia
- List of rivers of New South Wales (A–K)
- Rivers of New South Wales
