= Cassilis, New South Wales =

Cassilis
- Suburb
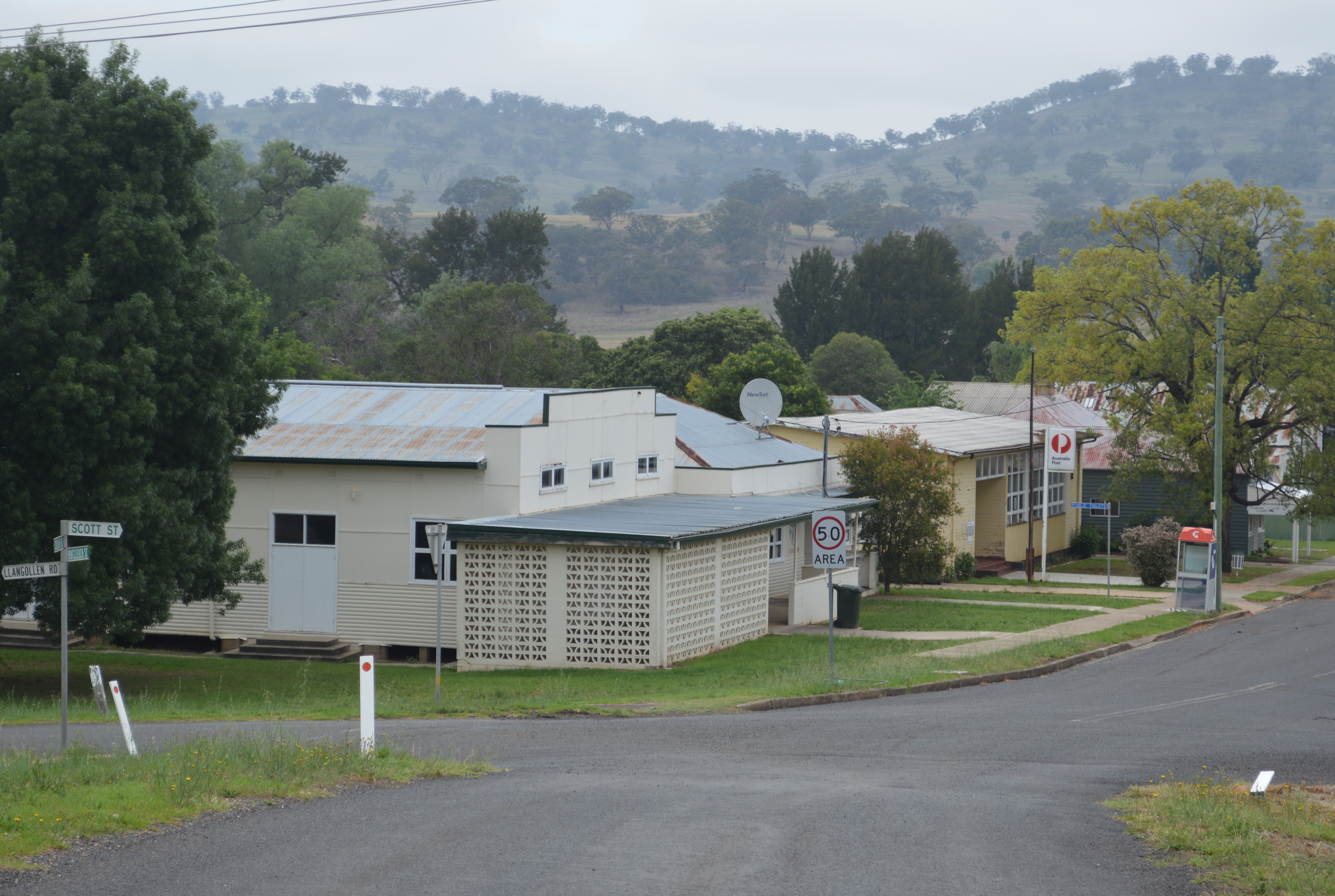
- Buccleugh Street, Cassilis, 2017

- Coordinates: 32°00′S 149°59′E
- Country: Australia
- State: New South Wales
- LGA: Upper Hunter Shire
- Location: 43 km (27 mi) NW of Merriwa; 86 km (53 mi) NW of Mudgee

Population
  - Total: 304 (2016)
- Postcode: 2329
- County: Bligh
- Parish: Turill

Cassilis is a village in the Hunter region of New South Wales, Australia.

Its population in the 2016 census was 304. 88.6% of people were born in Australia. The most common response for religion was Anglican at 45.8%.

It was formerly known as Dalkeith.
