= Wangat River =

River in New South Wales, Australia

Coordinates: 32°14′S 151°41′E

Wangat River Little River

Location
- Country: Australia
- State: New South Wales
- Region: NSW North Coast (IBRA), Hunter
- Local government area: Dungog

Physical characteristics
- Source: Gloucester Tops
  - location: near Gloucester Gap, Barrington Tops NP
  - elevation: 1,070 m (3,510 ft)
- Mouth: confluence with Chichester River
  - location: southeast of Chichester
  - elevation: 162 m (531 ft)
- Length: 20 km (12 mi)

Basin features
- River system: Hunter River catchment

Wangat River, a perennial river of the Hunter River catchment, is located in the Hunter region of New South Wales, Australia.

== Course and features ==
Wangat River rises below Gloucester Tops, west of Gloucester Gap, within Barrington Tops National Park, and flows generally southeast and south before reaching its confluence with the Chichester River, southeast of Chichester within Lake Chichester. The river descends 906 metres (2,972 ft) over its 20 kilometres (12 mi) course.

== See also ==
- Rivers of New South Wales
- List of rivers of Australia
- List of rivers of New South Wales (L–Z)
