= Merriwa, New South Wales =

Merriwa
- Town
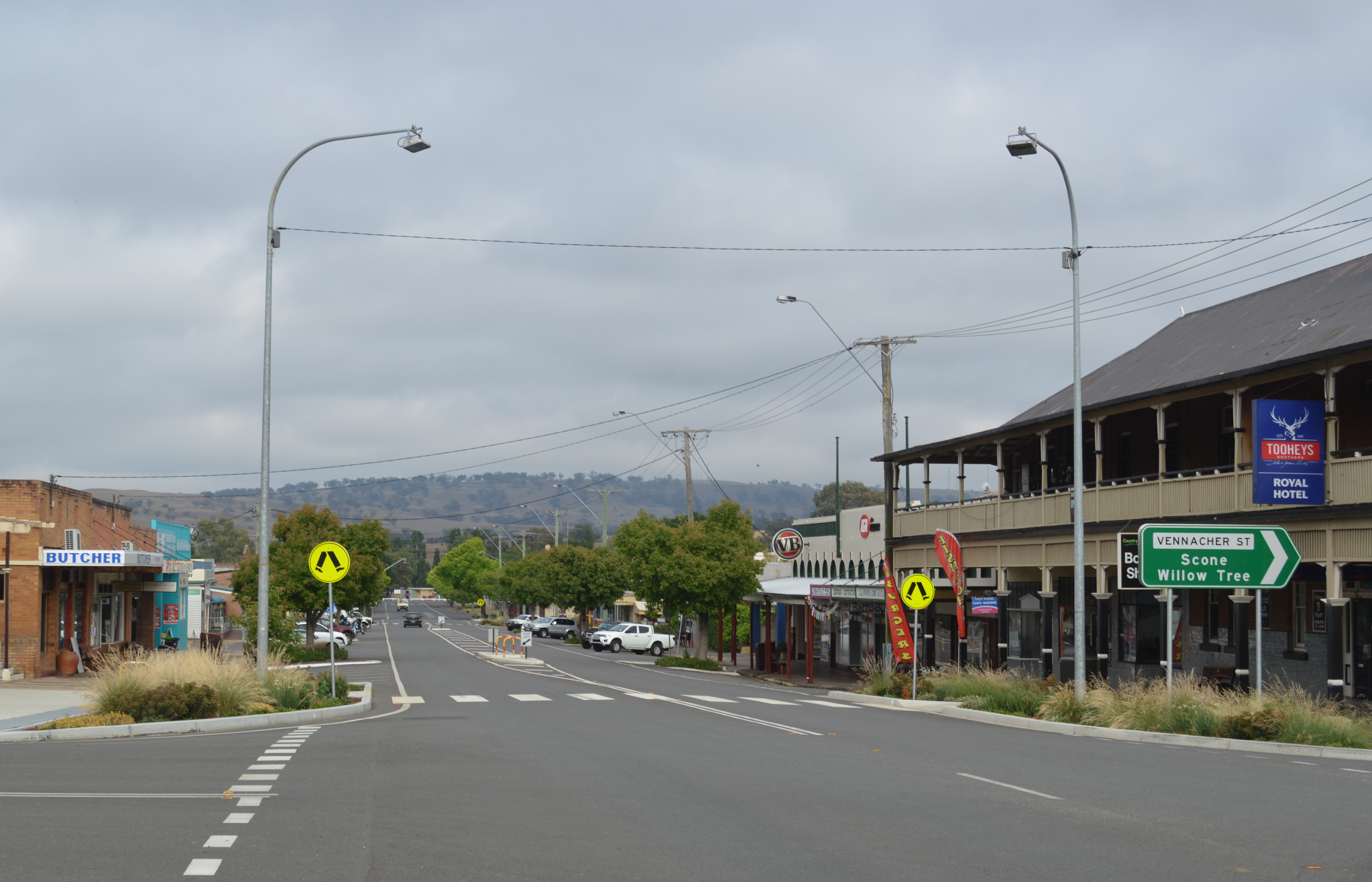
- Bettington Street (Golden Highway), the main street of Merriwa, 2017

- Coordinates: 32°9′S 150°21′E
- Country: Australia
- State: New South Wales
- LGA: Upper Hunter Shire
- Location: 273 km (170 mi) NW of Sydney

Population
  - Total: 1,790 (2011 census)
- Postcode: 2329

Merriwa is a town in the Upper Hunter Shire, in the far west of the Hunter region of New South Wales, Australia.

The town is located on the Golden Highway, 273 kilometres (170 mi) northwest of Sydney and about halfway between Newcastle and Dubbo. At the 2011 census, Merriwa had a population of 1,790 people. Up until 2004, Merriwa was part of the Merriwa Shire local government area, when it was merged with nearby Scone Shire and Murrurundi Shire councils to form the Upper Hunter Council.

The 1940 Melbourne Cup winner, Old Rowley, retired to Merriwa.

== Events ==
Every year, Merriwa hosts a range of events including;

- Merriwa Morgans Cup Races – Held Annually in April
- The Festival of the Fleeces – Queens Birthday June Long Weekend Annually
- Merriwa Springtime Show – 3rd weekend of September annually

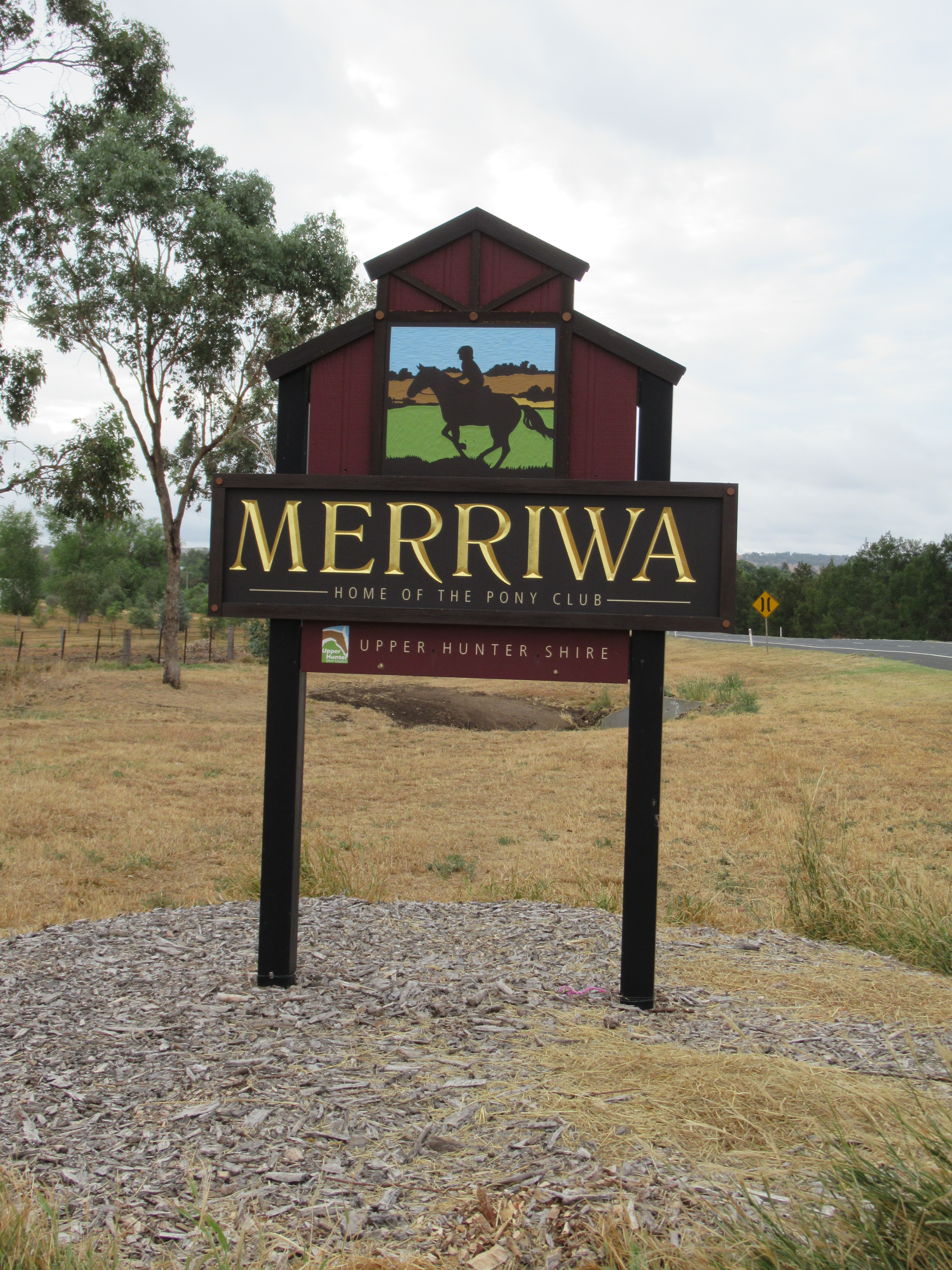
Entrance sign for the town of Merriwa, NSW

== Heritage listings ==
Merriwa has a number of heritage-listed sites, including:

- Bow Street: Colonial Cottage Museum (1857)
- Merriwa railway line
- Merriwa Courthouse attached police station and prisoner cells (1860–1958)
- Fitzroy Hotel Merriwa (1914)
- The Royal Hotel Merriwa (1914)
- Holy Trinity Church (1875–99)
- The Catholic Church (1881)

== Climate ==
Climate data for Merriwa (Roscommon)
Month	Jan	Feb	Mar	Apr	May	Jun	Jul	Aug	Sep	Oct	Nov	Dec	Year
Record high °C (°F)	43.8 (110.8)	45.4 (113.7)	37.4 (99.3)	33.2 (91.8)	28.8 (83.8)	23.1 (73.6)	24.7 (76.5)	28.0 (82.4)	34.3 (93.7)	37.4 (99.3)	43.0 (109.4)	43.7 (110.7)	45.4 (113.7)
Mean daily maximum °C (°F)	31.4 (88.5)	29.9 (85.8)	27.4 (81.3)	23.7 (74.7)	19.8 (67.6)	16.3 (61.3)	16.2 (61.2)	18.0 (64.4)	21.8 (71.2)	25.4 (77.7)	28.1 (82.6)	29.7 (85.5)	24.0 (75.2)
Mean daily minimum °C (°F)	16.9 (62.4)	15.7 (60.3)	13.8 (56.8)	9.4 (48.9)	5.2 (41.4)	4.0 (39.2)	2.2 (36.0)	2.7 (36.9)	5.2 (41.4)	8.5 (47.3)	12.4 (54.3)	14.7 (58.5)	9.2 (48.6)
Record low °C (°F)	5.4 (41.7)	6.9 (44.4)	3.0 (37.4)	−2.9 (26.8)	−3.8 (25.2)	−5.8 (21.6)	−5.7 (21.7)	−4.5 (23.9)	−3.7 (25.3)	−0.2 (31.6)	2.5 (36.5)	4.5 (40.1)	−5.8 (21.6)
Average precipitation mm (inches)	78.0 (3.07)	57.8 (2.28)	58.6 (2.31)	33.0 (1.30)	36.8 (1.45)	39.4 (1.55)	35.2 (1.39)	32.3 (1.27)	38.3 (1.51)	51.0 (2.01)	61.2 (2.41)	74.9 (2.95)	613.9 (24.17)
Average precipitation days	7.8	6.4	6.3	4.7	6.2	7.4	7.2	6.4	6.4	6.9	7.7	7.5	80.9
Source: Bureau of Meteorology

== Schools ==
- Merriwa Central School (Multi-campus)
- St Joseph's Private School

== Notable people ==
- Catherine Cecily O'Brien, Dominican sister and educationist
- Lachlan Walmsley, a Scottish international rugby league footballer who plays for the Halifax Panthers in the RFL Championship.

== See also ==
- Merriwa railway line
- Merriwa Community Portal
