= Goulburn River National Park =

National park in New South Wales, Australia

- IUCN category II (national park)
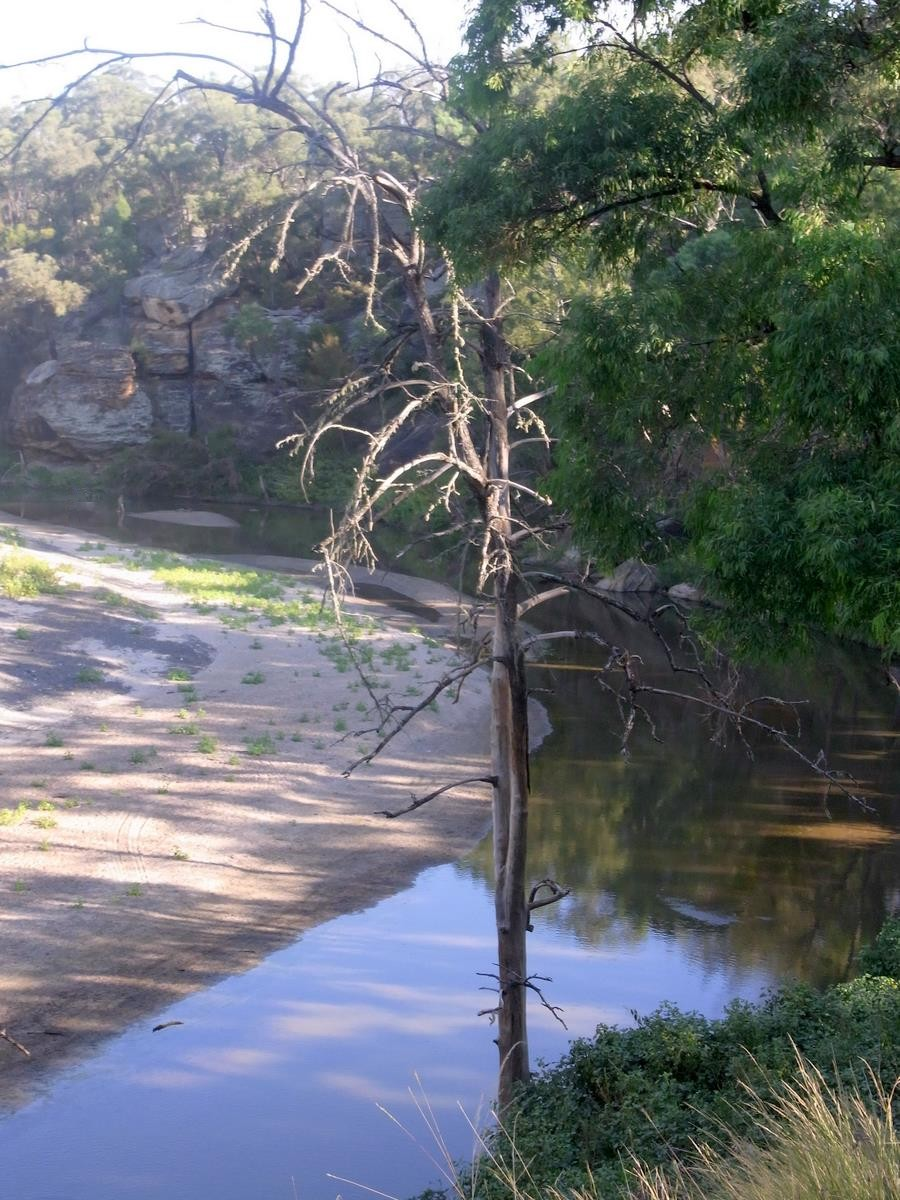

- Location within New South Wales
- Location: New South Wales
- Nearest city: Mudgee
- Coordinates: 32°14′S 150°0′E
- Area: 722.96 km^{2} (279.14 sq mi)
- Established: 1983
- Governing body: National Parks and Wildlife Service (New South Wales)
- Website: Official website

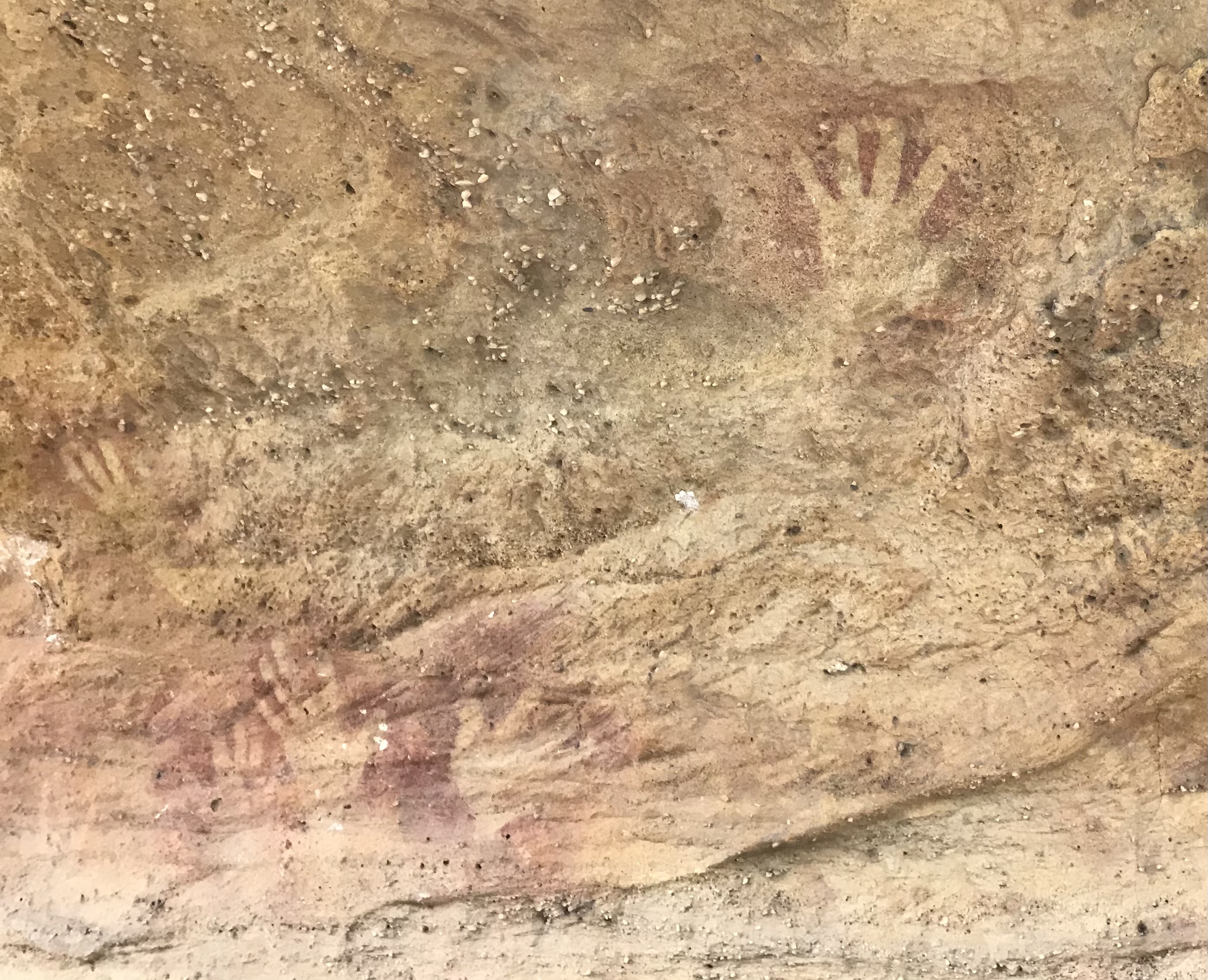
Rock art in Goulburn River NP

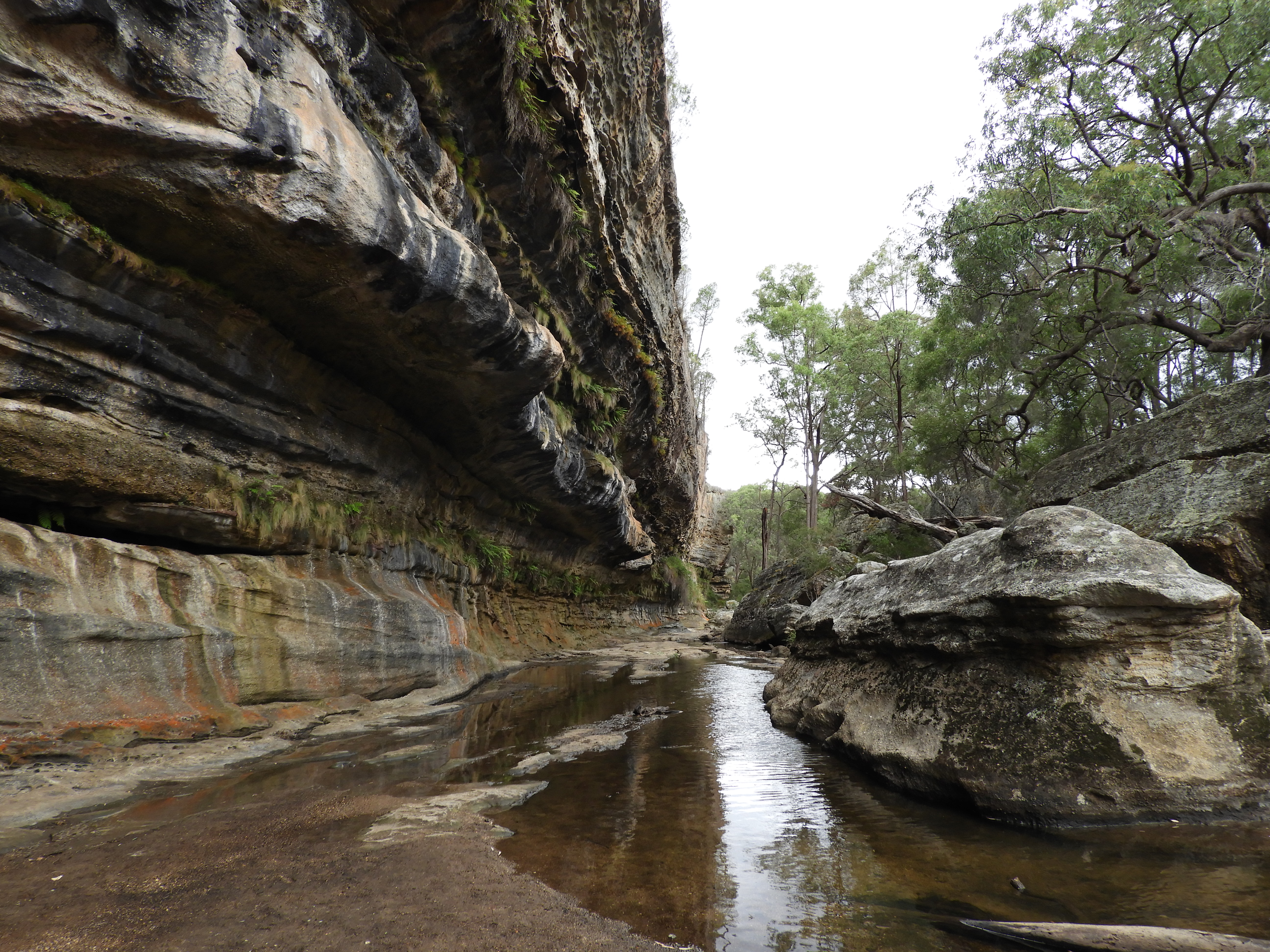
The Drip rock wall found in Goulburn River NP

The Goulburn River National Park is a national park located in New South Wales, Australia, 213 kilometres (132 mi) northwest of Sydney and it is 35 kilometres (22 mi) south-west of Merriwa. The Goulburn River National Park is located in the Hunter Valley region and covers approximately 90 kilometres (56 mi) of the Goulburn River. It is near the towns of Sandy Hollow, Denman, Merriwa, and Mudgee.

The park with its beautiful surroundings, forest and river offers many opportunities for recreation, such as fishing, hiking, kayaking, swimming and camping.

== Animals ==
The park is a sanctuary for kangaroos, wombats, emus, goannas, platypus, and a wide variety of birds. It lies within the Mudgee-Wollar Important Bird Area, so identified by BirdLife International because of its importance for the endangered regent honeyeater.

== Aboriginal heritage ==
The park contains some 300 or more aboriginal site (mostly along the river). The Wiradjuri, Gamileroi and Wonnarua Clans peoples have traditionally lived in this area since ancient times.

== See also ==
- Protected areas of New South Wales
