= Hunter Valley =

- Region
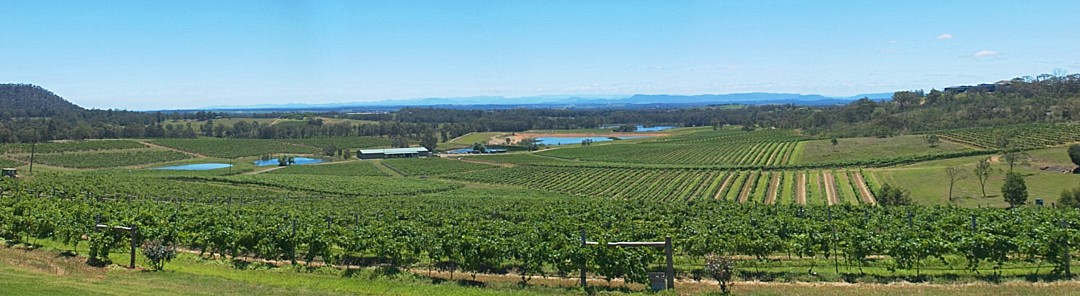
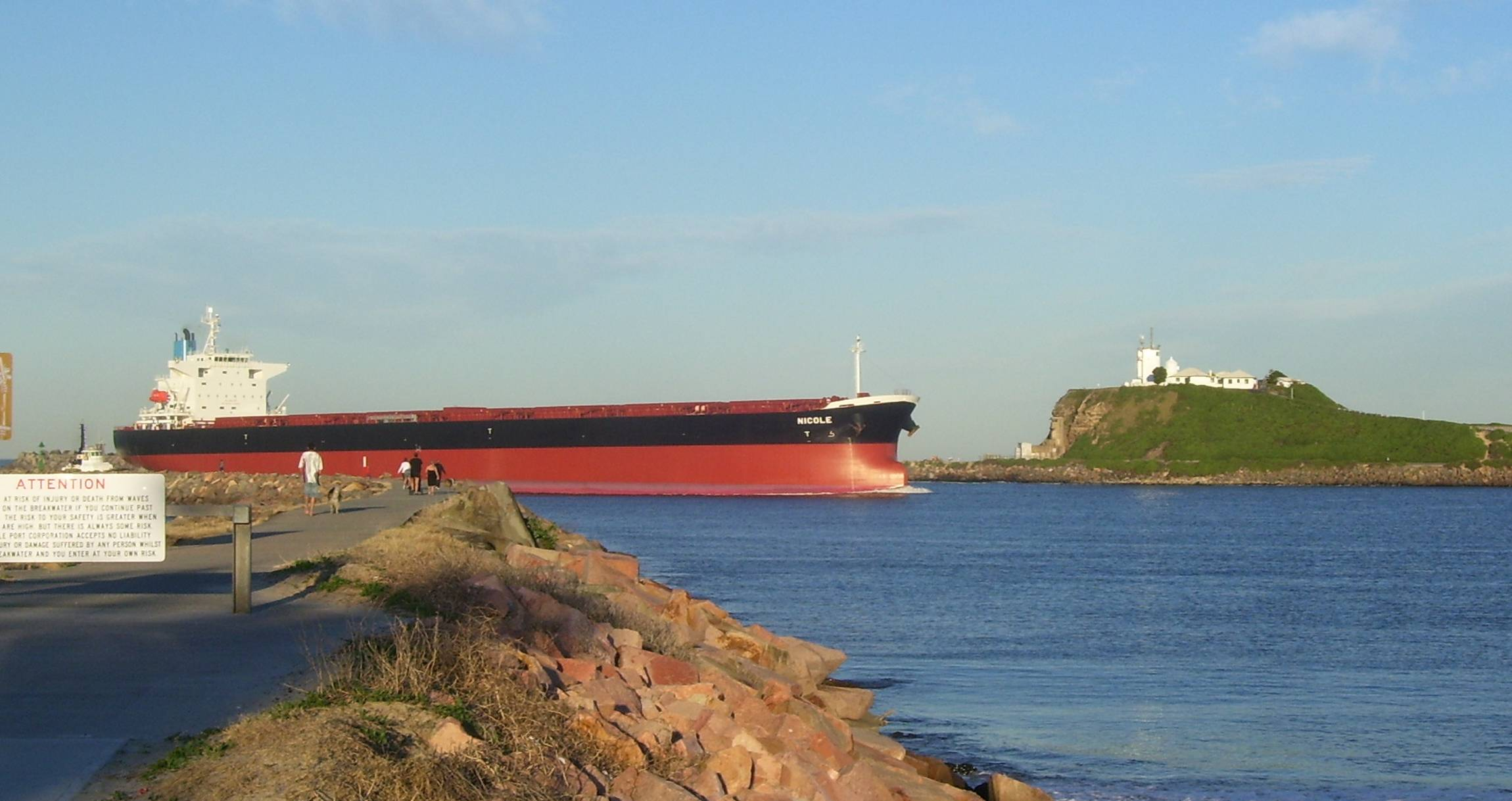
- View across the Hunter Valley The mouth of the Hunter River at Newcastle

- Coordinates: 32°33′36″S 151°10′15″E
- Country: Australia
- State: New South Wales
- LGAs: Greater Newcastle LGAs; City of Newcastle; City of Lake Macquarie; City of Maitland; City of Cessnock; Port Stephens Council; Other Hunter LGAs; Singleton Council; Dungog Shire; Muswellbrook Shire; Upper Hunter Shire
- Location: 162 km (101 mi) N of Sydney

Government
  - State electorate: Cessnock; Charlestown; Lake Macquarie; Maitland; Newcastle; Port Stephens; Swansea; Upper Hunter; Wallsend
  - Federal division: Hunter; Lyne; Newcastle; Paterson; Shortland

Area
  - Total: 22,694.2 km^{2} (8,762.3 sq mi)

Population
  - Total: 682,465 (2021) (Note: Population figure is the combined population of all LGAs in the region.)
  - Density: 30.07222/km^{2} (77.88670/sq mi)
- Time zone: UTC+10 (AEST)
  - Summer (DST): UTC+11 (AEDT)
Regions around Hunter Valley
North West Slopes	New England	Mid North Coast
Central West	Hunter Valley	Tasman Sea
Greater Sydney	Central Coast	Tasman Sea

The Hunter Valley, also commonly known as the Hunter Region, Newcastle Region, or simply Hunter, spans the region in central-eastern New South Wales, Australia, extending from approximately 162 km (101 mi) to 310 km (193 mi) north of Sydney. It contains the Hunter River and its tributaries with highland areas to the north and south. Situated at the northern end of the Sydney Basin bioregion, the Hunter Valley is one of the largest river valleys on the NSW coast, and is most commonly known for its wineries and coal industry.

Most of the population of the Hunter Valley lives within 25 km (16 mi) of the coast, with 55% of the entire population living in the cities of Newcastle and Lake Macquarie. There are numerous other towns and villages scattered across the region in the eleven local government areas (LGAs) that make up the region. At the 2021 census the combined population of the region was 682,465, and is expected to reach over 1,000,000 people by 2031. Under Australia's wine appellation system, the Hunter Valley wine zone Australian Geographical Indication (GI) covers the entire catchment of the Hunter River and its tributaries. Within that, the Hunter valley is almost as large, and includes most of the wine-producing areas, excluding the metropolitan area of Newcastle and nearby coastal areas, some national parks, and any land that was in the Mudgee Shire (at the western heights of the catchment).

The Hunter Valley wine region is one of Australia's best known wine regions, playing a pivotal role in the history of Australian wine as one of the first wine regions planted in the early 19th century. The success of the Hunter Valley wine industry has been dominated by its proximity to Sydney with its settlement and plantings in the 19th century fuelled by the trade network that linked the Hunter Valley to Sydney. The steady demand of consumers from Sydney continues to drive much of the Hunter Valley wine industry, including a factor in the economy by the tourism industry. While the Hunter Valley has been supplanted by the massive Riverina wine region as the largest producer of New South Wales wine, it still accounts for around 3% of Australia's total wine production and is one of the country's most recognisable regions.

== History ==
For over 30,000 years Aboriginal Australians inhabited the land that is now known as the Hunter Valley wine region. Along with the Worimi to the north and the Awabakal to the south, the Wonnarua people developed a trading route connecting the Coquun (Hunter) Valley to the harbour now known as Sydney harbour.

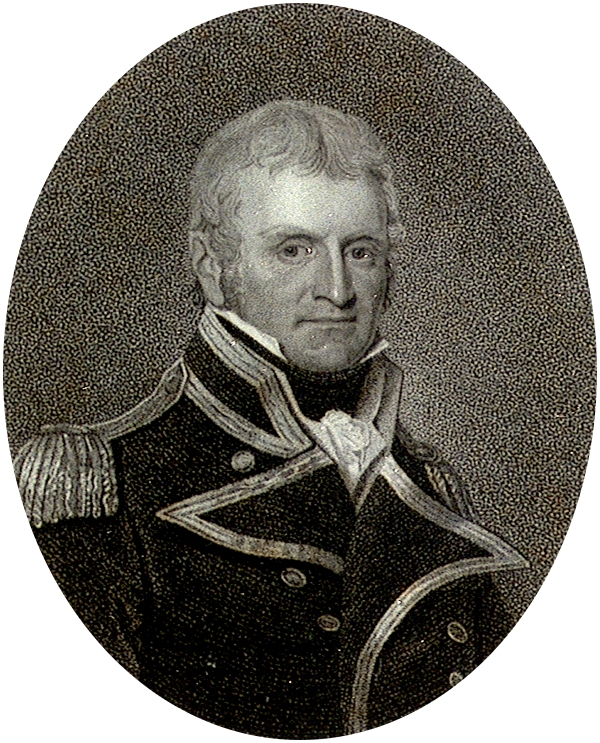
Lieutenant John Shortland was the first European to survey the Hunter River in 1797.

The wine-making history of Hunter Valley begins with the European settlement of the Sydney and the New South Wales region of Australia in the late 18th century as a penal colony of the British Empire. The Hunter River itself was discovered, by accident, in 1797 by British Lieutenant John Shortland as he searched for escaped convicts. The region soon became a valuable source for timber and coal that fuelled the steamship trade coming out of Sydney.

Land prospector John Howe cut a path through the Australian wilderness from Sydney up to the overland area in what is now known as the (Lower) Hunter Valley proper in 1820. Today, the modern Putty Road between the cities of Windsor and Singleton follows Howe's exact path and is a major thoroughfare for wine tourists coming into the Hunter Valley from Sydney. As previous plantings in the coastal areas around Sydney succumbed to the humidity and wetness, and plantings to the west were limited by spring frost damage, northern reaches leading to the Hunter became, almost by default, the wine region of the new colony.

The expansive growth of the Hunter Valley wine industry in the mid to late 19th century arose from its monopoly position in the lucrative Sydney market. The provincial government of New South Wales had enacted regulations that placed prohibitive duties on wines from other areas such as Victoria and South Australia. Following World War I, many returning Australian veterans were given land grants in the Hunter Valley. This temporarily produced an up-tick in plantings but the global Great Depression as well as a series of devastating hail storms between 1929 and 1930 caused many growers to abandon their vineyards.

== Geography ==
=== Geology ===
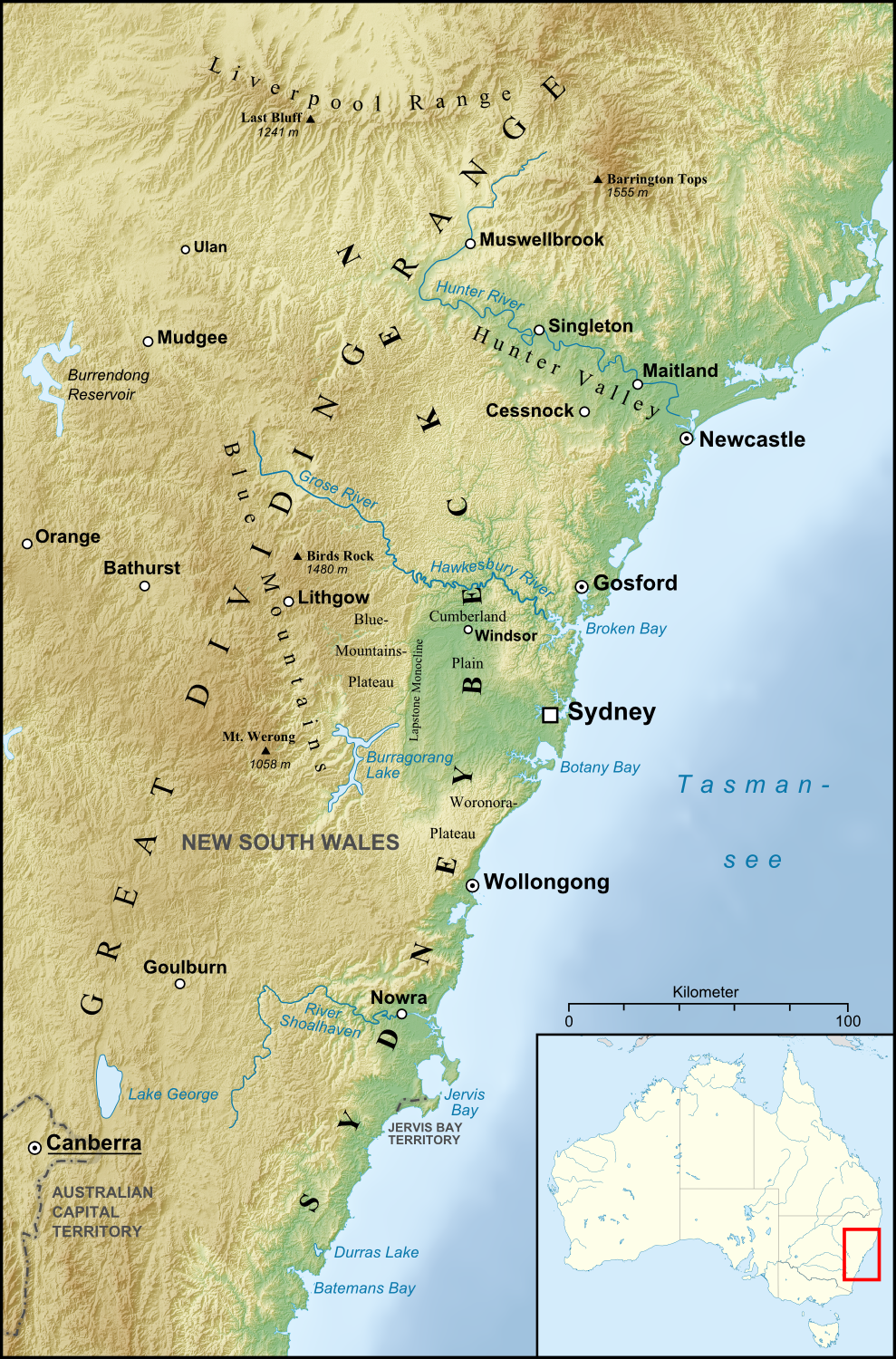
The Sydney Basin showing the Great Dividing Range, the Hunter Valley and the Barrington Tops to the north of the Hunter

The Hunter Valley is considered a transitional area between the Paleozoic rock foundation of the New England Fold Belt located to the south and the Early Permian and Middle Triassic period rock formations of the Sydney Basin to the south. Between these two geological areas is the Hunter-Mooki Thrust fault. At one time this fault was very geologically active and gave rise to the Brokenback range that feature prominently in the Hunter valley. Strips of basalt found throughout the region also bear witness to the volcanic activity that has occurred in the history of this fault.

The Permian rocks in the central and southeastern expanse of the Lower Hunter Valley were formed when the area was underneath a shallow marine estuary. The remnants of this period has left an extensive network of coal seams that fuelled the early population boom of the Hunter Valley in the 19th century as well a high degree of salinity in the water table of much of the area. The further north and west, towards the Brokenback Range and the Upper Hunter, the more Triassic sandstone that can be found leading eventually to the carboniferous rocks that form the northern boundary of the Hunter with the New England Fold Belt and the foothills of the Barrington Tops.

Overall, the Hunter Valley has more soils (mostly hard, acidic patches of poorly draining heavy clay) that are unsuitable for viticulture than they have areas that are ideal for growing grapes. The soils of the Lower Hunter vary widely from sandy alluvial flats (often planted to Semillon), to deep friable loam (often planted with Shiraz) and friable red duplex soils. In the Upper Hunter, the rivers and creeks of the region contribute to the areas black, silty loam soils that are often overlaid on top of alkaline clay loam. Among the hills of the Brokenback range are strips of volcanic basalt that are prized by growers for their tendencies to restrict vigor and concentrate mineral flavours in the grapes. The Central Hunter Valley eucalypt forest and woodland, part of the Coastal Valley Grassy Woodlands, occurs on these soils.

=== Rivers ===
The main river in the region is the Hunter River, after which the region is named. Other rivers in the region include the Allyn, Avon, Barrington, Bow, Bowman, Chichester, Gloucester, Goulburn, Isis, Karuah, Krui, Mammy Johnsons, Merriwa, Munmurra, Pages, Paterson, Wangat and Williams rivers.

Despite being the area's namesake, the Hunter River itself is not the dominant feature of the region—falling behind the Brokenback Range for that distinction. The greater river system of the Hunter, which includes the Goulburn and important tributaries such as Giants Creek, do provide needed irrigation for areas such as the Upper Hunter than can be prone to drought condition. The origins of the river begin the Liverpool Range of the volcanic Barrington Tops and flows south and then east down to the Pacific Ocean at the seaport city of Newcastle.

=== Water supply ===
Fresh water supply for the region is provided from a number of sources, which are managed by the Hunter Water and State Water Corporations. State Water Corporation's dams supply water for irrigation, industrial use at coal mines and the region's coal-fired power stations, and town water to upper Hunter Valley towns. Hunter Water Corporation's dams supply the large urban population of more than 500,000 living near the coast and centred on the cities of Newcastle and Lake Macquarie.

State Water Corporation's Glenbawn, the largest dam in the region, Chichester and Lostock are dams on the Hunter, Chichester and Paterson rivers respectively. Hunter Water Corporation's Grahamstown Dam, the largest dam supplying the urban areas of the lower Hunter Valley, is supplied with water diverted from the Williams River just north of the Seaham Weir, through a large pump station at Balickera. The dam itself has only a small natural catchment and relies mainly on the pumped water from the Williams River. A proposal to build Tillegra Dam on the Williams River existed since the 1950s, but was scrapped in 2010. In addition to the dams, fresh water for the lower Hunter Valley is supplied from the Tomago Sandbeds, via a series of bores.

=== Towns and cities ===
The Hunter Valley includes four cities. In order of population these are Lake Macquarie, Newcastle, Maitland and Cessnock. Other major centres of the Hunter Valley are Dungog, Gloucester, Kurri Kurri, Muswellbrook, Raymond Terrace, Scone and Singleton.

=== Climate ===
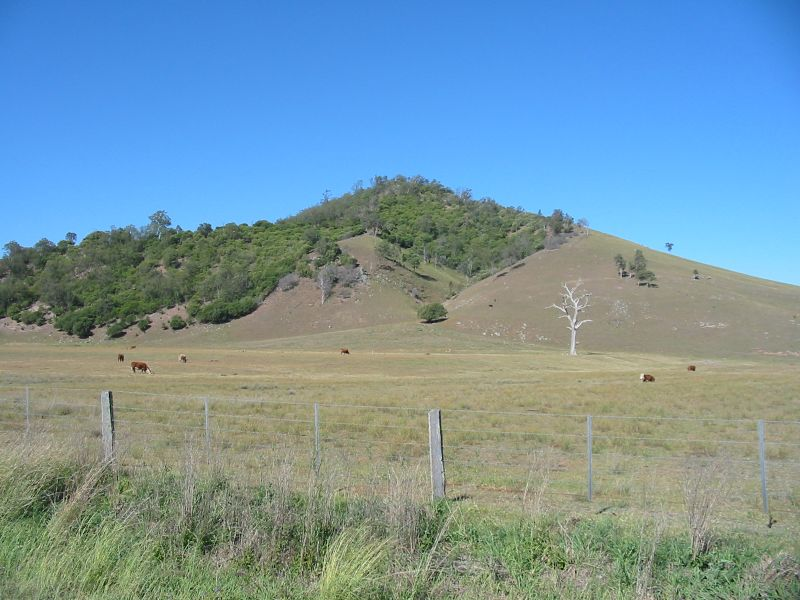
Parts of the Upper Hunter Valley can be very dry and experience drought conditions during the growing season.

The climate of Hunter Valley is humid subtropical, similar to the Greater Western Sydney region, with distinctive maritime influences from the Pacific Ocean. With its northerly latitude and close oceanic influences, the Hunter Valley is one of Australia's hottest and wettest wine regions. Flanked by mountains to the west and north the Hunter Valley acts as a funnel, pulling cool ocean breezes into the area. With those cooling breezes also comes heavy rainfall and periodic cyclonic storms in the summer and autumn months.

In the summer, the average daily temperature regularly exceeds 21.1 °C (70.0 °F) while during the winter the temperature averages around 14 °C (57.2 °F). Temperatures during January average between 22.7–23.3 °C (72.9–73.9 °F), with the temperature becoming progressively hotter the further inland you move away from the cooling influence of the sea. During the spring the Hunter Valley receives an average of 7.3–7.5 hours of sunshine a day.

Mid-latitude westerly winds bring high pressure weather front that alternate with cold fronts on the winter. This leads to generally drier conditions in the winter months of July and August. In the summer, southeasterly winds bring weather fronts harbouring extensive amounts of moisture. Between October and April more than two-thirds of the region's annual rainfall will fall with January and February being the wettest months. Between the months of October–April, the 3 pm average for relative humidity in the Lower Hunter is 49%, while it is 43% in the Upper Hunter.

Climate data for Newcastle (coast)
Month	Jan	Feb	Mar	Apr	May	Jun	Jul	Aug	Sep	Oct	Nov	Dec	Year
Record high °C (°F)	42.5 (108.5)	40.9 (105.6)	39.0 (102.2)	36.8 (98.2)	28.5 (83.3)	26.1 (79.0)	26.3 (79.3)	29.9 (85.8)	34.4 (93.9)	36.7 (98.1)	41.0 (105.8)	42.0 (107.6)	42.5 (108.5)
Mean daily maximum °C (°F)	25.6 (78.1)	25.4 (77.7)	24.7 (76.5)	22.8 (73.0)	20.0 (68.0)	17.5 (63.5)	16.7 (62.1)	18.1 (64.6)	20.2 (68.4)	22.2 (72.0)	23.6 (74.5)	24.9 (76.8)	21.8 (71.2)
Mean daily minimum °C (°F)	19.2 (66.6)	19.4 (66.9)	18.3 (64.9)	15.3 (59.5)	12.0 (53.6)	9.7 (49.5)	8.5 (47.3)	9.3 (48.7)	11.5 (52.7)	14.1 (57.4)	16.2 (61.2)	18.0 (64.4)	14.3 (57.7)
Record low °C (°F)	12.0 (53.6)	10.3 (50.5)	11.1 (52.0)	7.4 (45.3)	4.7 (40.5)	3.0 (37.4)	1.8 (35.2)	3.3 (37.9)	5.0 (41.0)	6.5 (43.7)	7.2 (45.0)	11.0 (51.8)	1.8 (35.2)
Average precipitation mm (inches)	90.0 (3.54)	107.4 (4.23)	119.6 (4.71)	116.9 (4.60)	115.6 (4.55)	117.5 (4.63)	93.2 (3.67)	73.2 (2.88)	72.1 (2.84)	72.5 (2.85)	71.0 (2.80)	80.9 (3.19)	1,129.9 (44.48)
Average precipitation days	11.1	11.2	12.4	12.3	12.6	12.3	11.2	10.5	10.0	10.9	10.8	10.6	135.9
Average afternoon relative humidity (%)	72	74	72	66	64	63	59	56	59	64	68	71	66
Source: Bureau of Meteorology

Climate data for Scone Airport (Upper Hunter Valley region)
Month	Jan	Feb	Mar	Apr	May	Jun	Jul	Aug	Sep	Oct	Nov	Dec	Year
Record high °C (°F)	43.5 (110.3)	43.5 (110.3)	41.0 (105.8)	36.0 (96.8)	28.7 (83.7)	24.4 (75.9)	24.5 (76.1)	29.8 (85.6)	34.1 (93.4)	39.0 (102.2)	43.4 (110.1)	42.4 (108.3)	43.5 (110.3)
Mean daily maximum °C (°F)	31.1 (88.0)	29.8 (85.6)	27.9 (82.2)	24.5 (76.1)	20.1 (68.2)	17.0 (62.6)	16.3 (61.3)	18.3 (64.9)	21.5 (70.7)	24.9 (76.8)	27.7 (81.9)	30.2 (86.4)	24.1 (75.4)
Mean daily minimum °C (°F)	16.9 (62.4)	16.9 (62.4)	14.6 (58.3)	11.3 (52.3)	8.1 (46.6)	6.0 (42.8)	4.7 (40.5)	5.5 (41.9)	7.9 (46.2)	10.8 (51.4)	13.3 (55.9)	15.7 (60.3)	11.0 (51.8)
Record low °C (°F)	8.2 (46.8)	8.6 (47.5)	4.7 (40.5)	1.3 (34.3)	−1.0 (30.2)	−2.0 (28.4)	−2.7 (27.1)	−3.0 (26.6)	−1.3 (29.7)	0.5 (32.9)	5.0 (41.0)	6.4 (43.5)	−3.0 (26.6)
Average precipitation mm (inches)	82.3 (3.24)	77.3 (3.04)	52.2 (2.06)	38.9 (1.53)	46.5 (1.83)	45.5 (1.79)	36.5 (1.44)	38.1 (1.50)	38.5 (1.52)	57.8 (2.28)	62.0 (2.44)	67.9 (2.67)	643.1 (25.32)
Average precipitation days	8.3	7.8	7.1	6.7	7.4	9.4	8.1	7.6	7.0	8.8	8.6	8.6	95.4

== Industries ==
The main industries in the Hunter Valley are coal mining, manufacturing, agriculture, viticulture and wine making, tourism, horse breeding, electricity production, dairy farming and beef cattle farming, and associated service industries. The Hunter Valley is one of Australia's most famous wine-growing regions, known for both its red and white wine varieties.

=== Coal mining ===
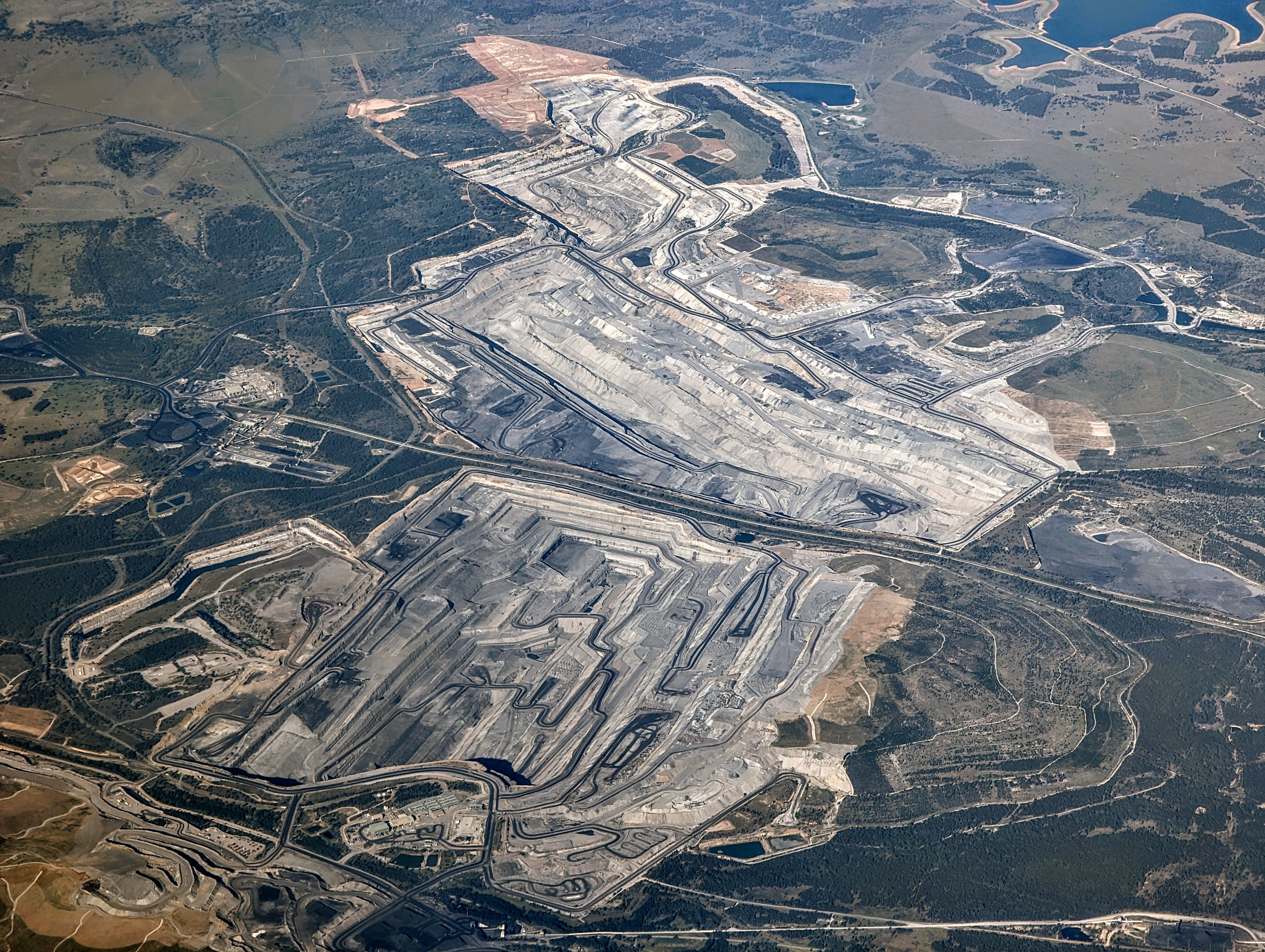
Ravensworth open-cut coal mining operations run by Glencore

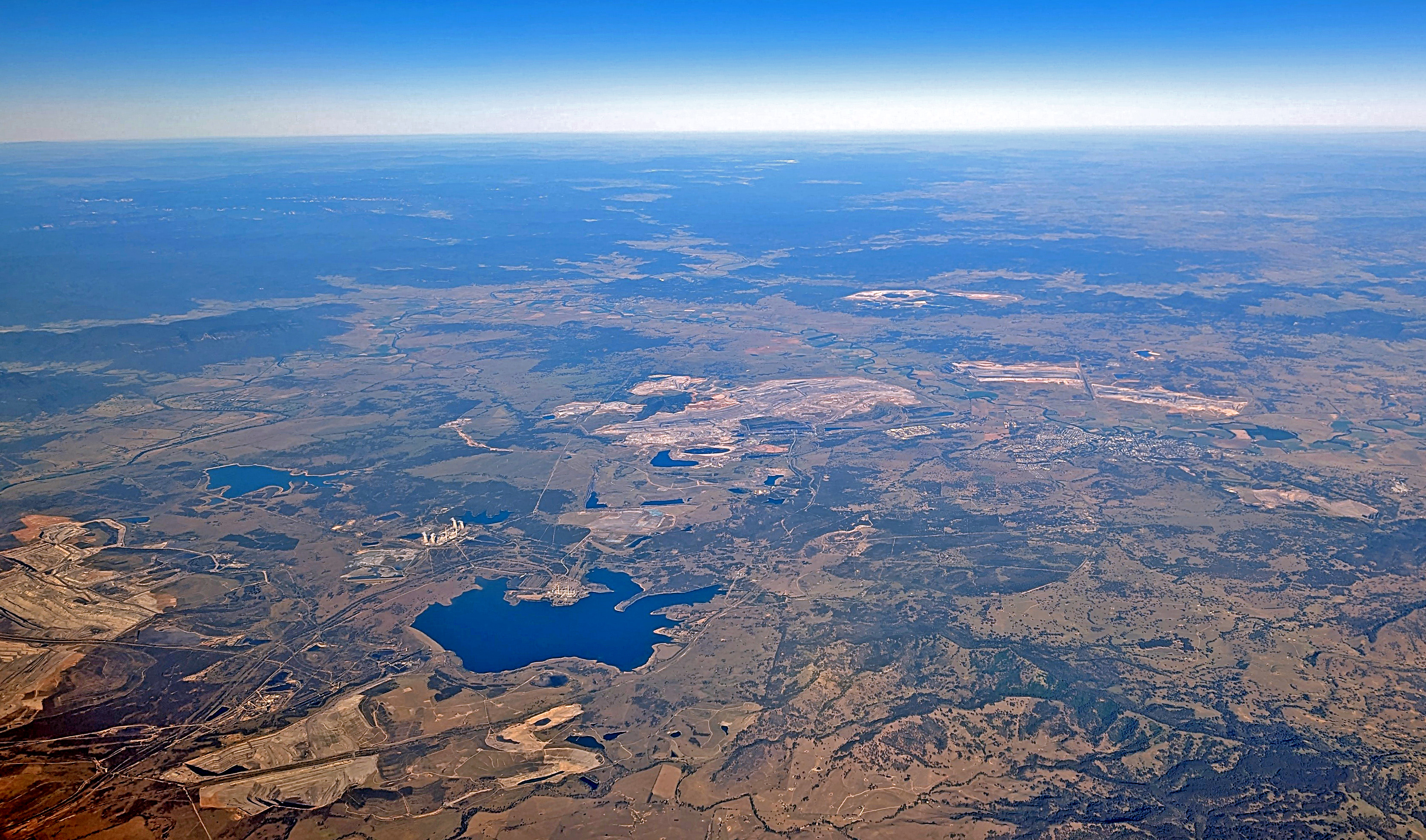
Aerial view of Hunter Valley coal operations, including several mines and power plants

The most important economic activity in the valley is coal mining (through businesses such as Glencore and BHP), mostly for export. The Port of Newcastle is the world's largest export facility for coal, most of which is brought to the port by rail. Coal ships are often seen off the coast of Newcastle.

=== Electricity generation ===
Electricity generation at the Eraring, Bayswater, Liddell, Munmorah, Redbank and Vales Point coal-fired power stations is a major industry of the region.

=== Horse breeding ===
The Hunter Valley is Australia's main region for the breeding and rearing of Thoroughbred horses and most of the country's best racehorses. The Upper Hunter area around Scone is one of the largest horse breeding areas in the world.

=== Tourism ===
Commonly known as "Wine Country", the Hunter Valley is a major tourist destination in New South Wales and is the 6th most visited place in Australia attracting more than 2.5 million people annually. There are regular events held in the Hunter for visitors, including the Hunter Valley Steam Trains running the first three Sundays of each month and regular scenic cruises on the Hunter River and Lake Macquarie.

=== Wine production ===
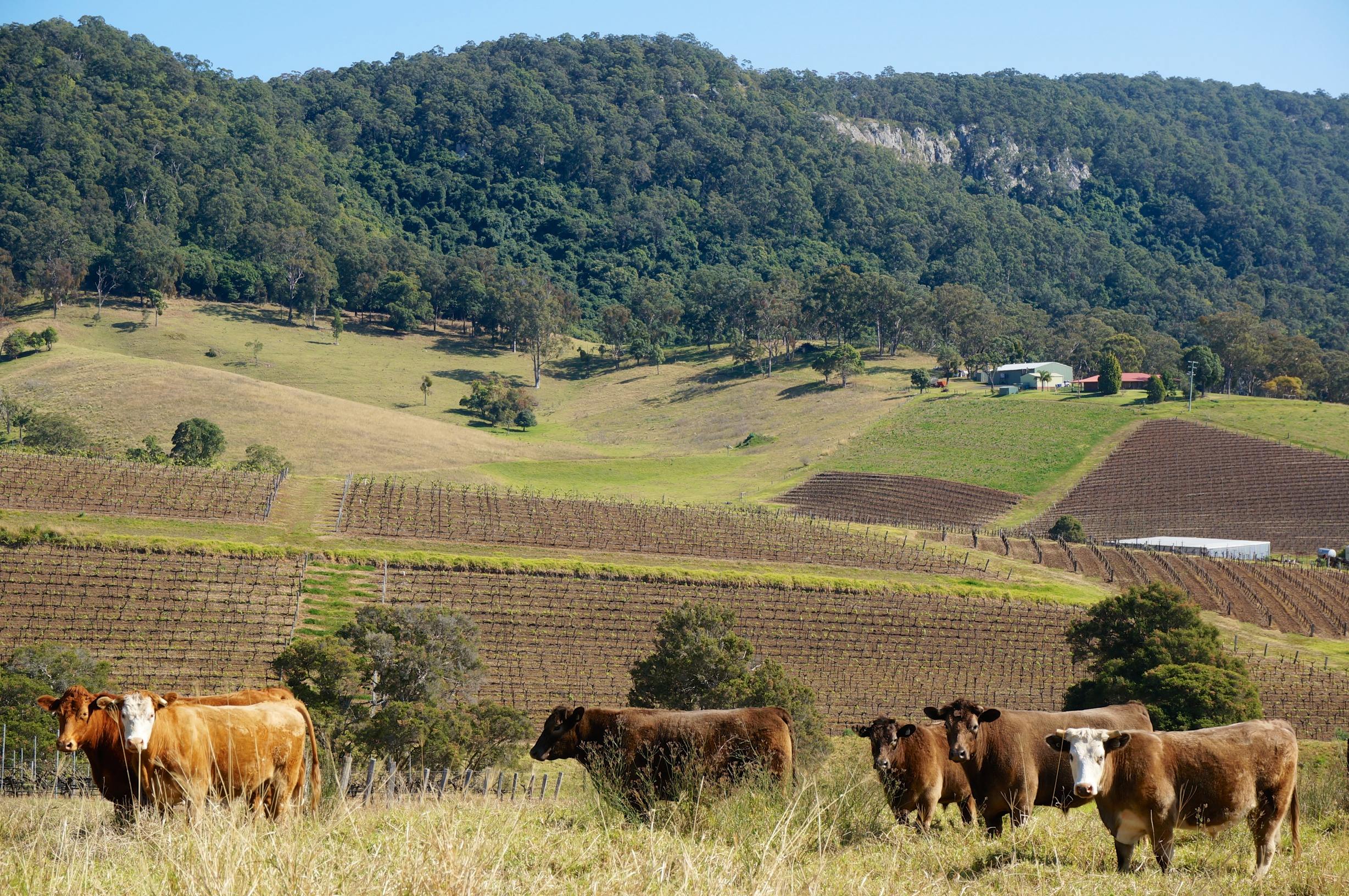
A Hunter Valley vineyard

The Hunter Valley Wine Zone Australian Geographical Indication was registered on 1 May 1996 and is approximately the entire Hunter River catchment. It contains only one named wine region, Hunter. The Hunter Wine Region Australian Geographical Indication was declared on 18 March 1997. It is not as large as the Hunter Valley zone, but includes most of the significant vineyards. It does not extend east of the Pacific Highway.

Some of the oldest vines in the Hunter Valley were planted in 1924 around the village of Fordwich. Pokolbin, located in the "Lower Hunter Valley", is the centre of the Hunter Valley wine region, which claims to be Australia's oldest wine region. It is located between the towns of Cessnock and Branxton, about 50 km (31 mi) west of Newcastle. The wine country is primarily located within the Cessnock and Singleton LGAs. Its proximity to Sydney has been an influence on the area's investments in wine production and its emergence as a tourist destination. The Broke Fordwich area is located along the Hunter River tributary of the Wollombi Brook near the suburb of Pokolbin and was founded in 1830 by Major Thomas Mitchell who named the region after his fellow Napoleonic War veteran Sir Charles Broke-Vere.

Much of the rolling countryside around Pokolbin is under vine and has a large number of vineyards, restaurants, shops, golf courses and country guesthouses. Other parts of the valley including the Wollombi Valley and Broke Fordwich subregion are also well known for wine, along with the Upper Hunter Valley. The main town in the Upper Hunter Valley subregion is Muswellbrook.

== Transport ==
The region's main airport is Newcastle Airport which is the 13th busiest airport in Australia, handling over 1.4 million passengers in the year of 2024. The airport provides direct routes to Melbourne, Brisbane, Perth, Hobart, Adelaide, Canberra, Gold Coast, Lord Howe Island and also international destinations to Bali and Singapore. There are smaller airports in the region such as Cessnock Airport, Maitland Airport and Scone Airport. However, most residents in the region would also use Sydney Airport as an international hub, the airport is located 179 km (111 mi) south of Newcastle.

== Administration ==
=== Political representation ===
For the purposes of Australian federal elections for the House of Representatives, the Hunter Valley is contained within the divisions of Hunter, Lyne, Newcastle, Paterson, and Shortland.

For the purposes of New South Wales elections for the Legislative Assembly, the Hunter Valley is contained within the electoral districts of Cessnock, Charlestown, Lake Macquarie, Maitland, Myall Lakes, Newcastle, Port Stephens, Swansea, Upper Hunter, Wallsend, and Wyong.

=== Demography and area ===
The following local government areas are contained within the region:

Population by local government area
Hunter rank	Local government area	Estimate resident population 30 June 2020	1 year growth rate	Population density (people/km^{2})
1	City of Lake Macquarie	207,775	0.9	320.3
2	City of Newcastle	167,363	1.1	896.2
3	City of Maitland	87,395	2.6	223.2
4	Port Stephens Council	74,506	1.4	86.8
5	City of Cessnock	61,256	2.1	31.2
6	Singleton Council	23,380	−0.3	4.8
7	Muswellbrook Shire	16,355	−0.1	4.8
8	Upper Hunter Shire	14,167	−0.1	1.7
9	Dungog Shire	9,664	2.6	4.3
Hunter		661,861	1.3	29.2

=== Environmental protection ===
The Hunter Region contains the Goulburn River National Park, Myall Lakes National Park, Barrington Tops National Park, Werakata National Park, Watagans National Park, Mount Royal National Park, Polkolbin State Forest, Putty State Forest, Chichester State Forest, Running Creek Nature Reserve, The Glen Nature Reserve, Black Bulga State Conservation Area, Myall River State Forest, and Karuah Nature Reserve.

Within the Hunter, many endangered ecological communities (EECs) have been declared under the TSC Act. These communities are found on both public and private land, and prior to development of land, the landowner is required to undertake an environmental assessment to ascertain whether it will impact endangered species or endangered communities. Examples of endangered ecological communities found within the Hunter Region are:

1. Grey Box–Grey Gum Wet Sclerophyll Forest
2. Hunter Floodplain Red Gum Woodland
3. Hunter Lowland Redgum Forest
4. Hunter Valley Vine Thicket
5. Hunter Valley Weeping Myall Woodland
6. Lower Hunter Valley Dry Rainforest
7. Warkworth Sands Woodland. This EEC occurs on aeolian sands, south east of Singleton (but may occur elsewhere in the Bioregion.)

== Statehood movement ==
There is an active movement campaigning for the Hunter Region to secede from New South Wales to form its own state. The sale of the Port of Newcastle and the refusal of the NSW state government to build a container terminal in Newcastle has been cited as the motivation behind the campaign. The movement's demands include a Royal commission into the feasibility of Hunter Valley Statehood as soon as possible, and a referendum on Hunter Valley statehood by 2030.

Chapter VI of the Constitution of Australia allows new states to be formed, but only with the consent of the Parliament of the state in question.

== Media ==
=== Radio ===
Radio stations that broadcast to the region are:

- ABC Newcastle serving Newcastle and surrounding areas (part of ABC Local Radio)
- ABC Upper Hunter serving Muswellbrook and surrounding areas (part of ABC Local Radio)
- hit106.9 Newcastle (commercial)
- Triple M Newcastle (commercial)
- New FM (commercial)
- 2NUR serving Newcastle (community)
- Power FM 98.1 serving Muswellbrook and rest of the region (community)
- 2NM serving Muswellbrook (community)

=== Television ===
The region is also served by five television networks, three commercial and two national services:

- Nine Northern NSW – Nine Network affiliated, owned by WIN Corporation. Pre-aggregation, NBN Television was the incumbent commercial station in the Newcastle and Hunter Valley.
- 10 Northern NSW – Network 10 owned and operated
- Seven Northern NSW – Seven Network owned and operated
- ABC Television
- SBS Television

WIN Television airs NBN News live from their Honeysuckle studios in Newcastle each night at 5:30pm. The bulletin is locally produced stories sourced from the Nine Network. Local news updates are aired by the Seven, Nine (as NBN News) and 10 throughout the day to fulfil local content quotas.

== See also ==
- Regions of New South Wales
- New South Wales wine
- List of endangered ecological communities in New South Wales
