= Woolly pomaderris =

Woolly pomaderris is a common name for several plants and may refer to:

- Pomaderris lanigera, endemic to southeastern Australia
- Pomaderris vellea, endemic to eastern Australia
