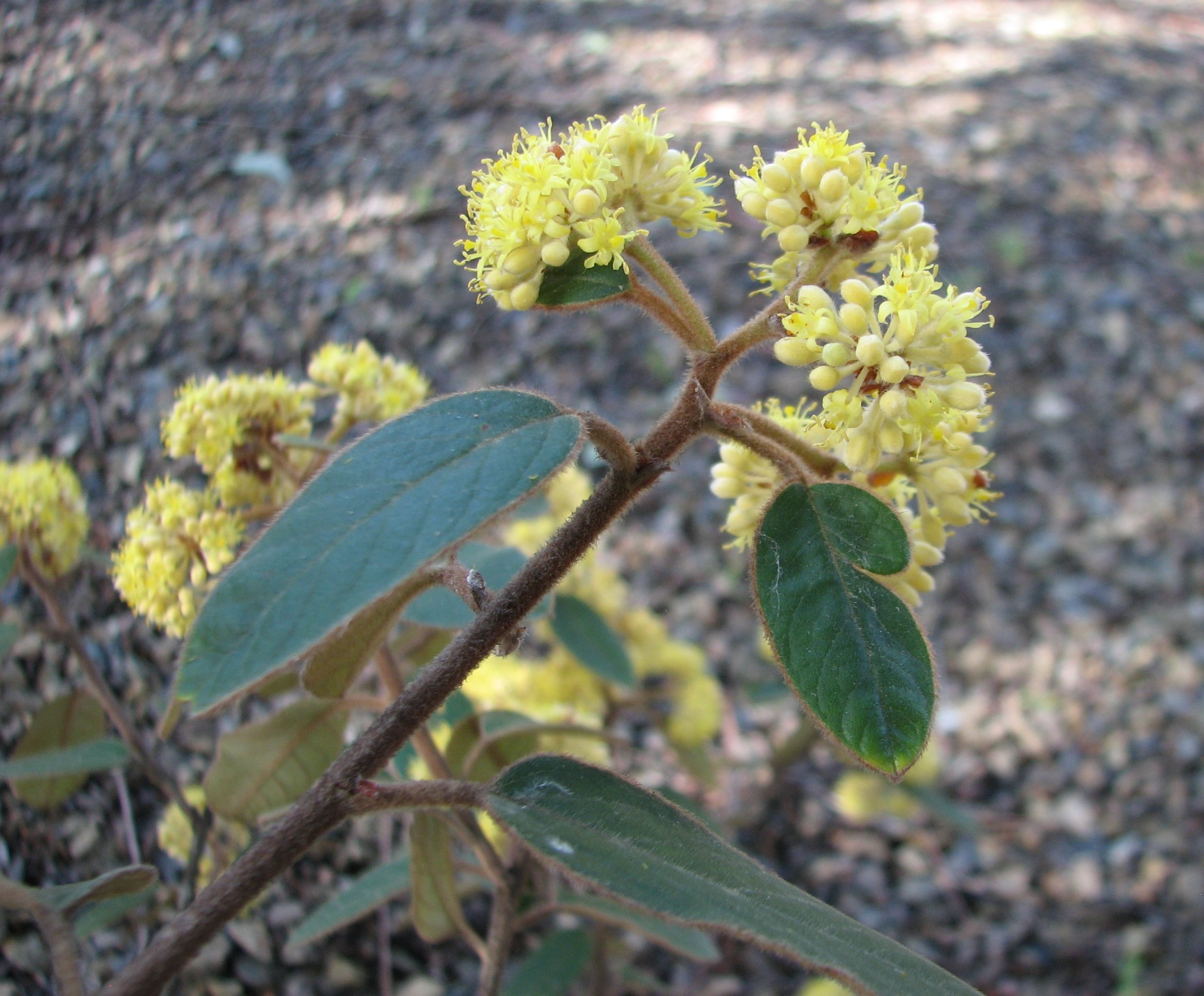
- Pomaderris vellea

Scientific classification
- Kingdom: Plantae
- Clade: Tracheophytes
- Clade: Angiosperms
- Clade: Eudicots
- Clade: Rosids
- Order: Rosales
- Family: Rhamnaceae
- Tribe: Pomaderreae
- Genus: Pomaderris; Labill.

Species
- See text

Synonyms
- List: Cryptandra sect. Pomaderris (Labill.) Kuntze; Ledelia Raf.; Pomaderris sect. Annulares N.G.Walsh; Pomaderris sect. Apetalae N.G.Walsh; Pomaderris sect. Flabellares N.G.Walsh; Pomaderris Labill. sect. Pomaderris; Pomaderris sect. Psilogyne N.G.Walsh; Pomaderris sect. Umbelliflorae N.G.Walsh; Pomaderris subg. Apomaderris Suess. nom. inval.; Pomaderris subg. Eupomaderris Suess nom. inval.; Pomatiderris Schult. orth. var.; Pomatoderris Schult. nom. illeg., nom. superfl.

= Pomaderris =

Family of shrubs and trees

Pomaderris is a genus of about 80 species of flowering plants in the family Rhamnaceae. The genus is mostly native to Australia, but is also present in New Zealand. Plants in the genus Pomaderris are usually shrubs, sometimes small trees with simple leaves arranged alternately along the branches and bisexual, woolly-hairy flowers arranged in racemes or panicles. The flowers are usually yellow and often lack petals.

== Description ==
Plants in the genus Pomaderris are shrubs, sometimes small trees, the young stems, lower surfaces of the leaves and flower parts are covered with woolly, star-shaped and simple hairs. The leaves are arranged alternately along the branches and are simple, with brown stipules at the base of the petiole but that are usually shed as the leaf matures. The flowers are arranged in small cymes, the groups arranged in racemes or panicles, and are usually yellow. The flowers have five sepals but the petals are usually absent or fall off as the flower opens, and there are five stamens in each flower. The fruit is a capsule that eventually splits into three valves.

== Taxonomy ==
The genus Pomaderris was first formally described in 1805 by Jacques Labillardière in his Novae Hollandiae Plantarum Specimen. The genus name means "a covering of leather or skin" referring to the valves of the fruit.

== Distribution ==
Species of Pomaderris occur in all Australian states and the Australian Capital Territory, but not the Northern Territory and in both the North and South Islands of New Zealand. Sixty-five of the species are native to Australia and the other five are from New Zealand. There is some overlap. A distinctive feature of the leaves, branches, and twigs of this genus, is that they are hairy.

== Ecology ==
Pomaderris species are used as food plants by the larvae of some Lepidoptera species including Aenetus ligniveren.

== Use in horticulture ==
A few of species in this genus are known to horticulture; the most commonly cultivated species is P. aspera, the hazel pomaderris.

== Species list ==
The following is a list of Pomaderris species accepted by Plants of the World Online as at December 2021, other than P. ferruginea which is accepted by the Australian Plant Census:

- Pomaderris adnata N.G.Walsh & Coates (N.S.W.)
- Pomaderris amoena Colenso (N.Z.)
- Pomaderris andromedifolia A.Cunn. (Qld., N.S.W., Vic.)
- Pomaderris angustifolia N.A.Wakef. (N.S.W., A.C.T., Vic.)
- Pomaderris apetala Labill. (Tas., Vic., N.Z.)
- Pomaderris argyrophylla N.A.Wakef. – silver pomaderris (N.S.W., Qld.)
- Pomaderris aspera Sieber ex DC. – hazel pomaderris (Qld, NSW, Vic, Tas.)
- Pomaderris aurea N.A.Wakef. (Vic.)
- Pomaderris betulina A.Cunn. ex Hook. – birch pomaderris (N.S.W., Vic.)
- Pomaderris bodalla N.G.Walsh & Coates – Bodalla pomaderris (N.S.W.)
- Pomaderris brevifolia N.G.Walsh (W.A.)
- Pomaderris briagolensis Messina (Vic.)
- Pomaderris brogoensis N.G.Walsh (N.S.W.)
- Pomaderris brunnea N.A.Wakef. – rufous pomaderris (N.S.W., Vic.)
- Pomaderris buchanensis N.G.Walsh (Vic.)
- Pomaderris canescens (Benth.) N.A.Wakef. (Qld.)
- Pomaderris cinerea Benth. (N.S.W.)
- Pomaderris clivicola (Benth.) N.A.Wakef. (Qld.)
- Pomaderris cocoparrana N.G.Walsh – Cocoparra pomaderris (N.S.W.)
- Pomaderris coomingalensis N.G.Walsh & Coates (Qld.)
- Pomaderris costata N.A.Wakef. (Vic., N.S.W.)
- Pomaderris cotoneaster N.A.Wakef. – cotoneaster pomaderris (N.S.W., Vic.)
- Pomaderris crassifolia N.G.Walsh & Coates (N.S.W., Qld.)
- Pomaderris delicata N.G.Walsh & Coates (N.S.W.)
- Pomaderris discolor (Vent.) Poir. (N.S.W., Vic.)
- Pomaderris edgerleyi Hook.f. (N.Z.)
- Pomaderris elachophylla F.Muell. – lacy pomaderris, small leaf pomaderris (N.S.W., Vic., Tas.)
- Pomaderris elliptica Labill. (N.S.W., Vic., Tas.)
- Pomaderris eriocephala N.A.Wakef. (N.S.W., A.C.T., Vic.)
- Pomaderris ferruginea Sieber ex Fenzl – rusty pomaderris (Qld, NSW, Vic.)
- Pomaderris flabellaris (F.Muell. ex Reissek) J.M.Black – fan pomaderris (S.A.)
- Pomaderris forrestiana F.Muell. (W.A., S.A.)
- Pomaderris gilmourii N.G.Walsh (N.S.W.)
- Pomaderris grandis F.Muell. – large pomaderris (W.A.)
- Pomaderris graniticola (N.G.Walsh & Coates) K.L.Mcdougall & Millott (Qld., N.S.W.)
- Pomaderris halmaturina J.M.Black (S.A., Vic.)
- Pomaderris hamiltonii L.B.Moore – pale-flowered kūmarahou (NZ)
- Pomaderris helianthemifolia (Reissek) N.A.Wakef. (N.S.W., Vic.)
- Pomaderris intermedia Sieber ex DC. – lemon dogwood (N.S.W., A.C.T., Vic., Tas.)
- Pomaderris kumeraho A.Cunn. – kūmarahou, gum-digger's soap (N.Z.)
- Pomaderris lanigera (Andrews) Sims – woolly pomaderris (Qld., N.S.W., Vic.)
- Pomaderris ledifolia A.Cunn. – Sydney pomaderris (N.S.W., Qld., Vic.)
- Pomaderris ligustrina Sieber ex DC. (N.S.W., Qld., Vic.)
- Pomaderris mediora N.G.Walsh & Coates (N.S.W.)
- Pomaderris myrtilloides Fenzl (W.A.)
- Pomaderris nitidula (Benth.) N.A.Wakef. (N.S.W., Qld.)
- Pomaderris notata S.T.Blake – McPherson Range pomaderris (N.S.W., Qld.)
- Pomaderris obcordata Fenzl – wedge-leaved pomaderris (S.A., presumed extinct in Vic.)
- Pomaderris oblongifolia N.G.Walsh (Vic.)
- Pomaderris oraria F.Muell. ex Reissek – Bassian dogwood (Tas, Vic.)
- Pomaderris pallida N.A.Wakef. (N.S.W., A.C.T.)
- Pomaderris paniculosa F.Muell. ex Reissek – scurfy pomaderris (W.A., S.A., Vic., Tas., N.Z.)
- Pomaderris parrisiae N.G.Walsh (N.S.W.)
- Pomaderris pauciflora N.A.Wakef. (N.S.W., Vic.)
- Pomaderris phylicifolia Lodd. ex Link – narrow-leaf pomaderris (N.S.W., A.C.T., Vic., Tas., N.Z.)
- Pomaderris pilifera N.A.Wakef. (N.S.W., Vic., Tas.)
- Pomaderris precaria N.G.Walsh & Coates (N.S.W.)
- Pomaderris prunifolia Fenzl – plum leaf pomaderris (Qld., N.S.W., A.C.T., Vic.)
- Pomaderris queenslandica C.T.White – scant pomaderris (Qld., N.S.W.)
- Pomaderris racemosa Hook. (S.A., Tas., Vic.)
- Pomaderris reperta N.G.Walsh & Coates – Denman pomaderris (NSW)
- Pomaderris rotundifolia (F.Muell.) Rye (W.A.)
- Pomaderris rugosa Cheeseman (N.Z.)
- Pomaderris sericea N.A.Wakef. – bent pomaderris (N.S.W., Vic.)
- Pomaderris subcapitata N.A.Wakef. (N.S.W., A.C.T., Vic.)
- Pomaderris subplicata N.G.Walsh (Vic.)
- Pomaderris tropica N.A.Wakef. (Qld.)
- Pomaderris vacciniifolia Reissek – round leaf pomaderris (Vic.)
- Pomaderris vellea N.A.Wakef. – woolly pomaderris(N.S.W., Qld.)
- Pomaderris velutina J.H.Willis – velvet pomaderris, velvety pomaderris (N.S.W., Vic.)
- Pomaderris virgata N.G.Walsh – upright pomaderris (N.S.W., Vic.)
- Pomaderris viridis N.G.Walsh (N.S.W., Vic.)
- Pomaderris walshii Millott & K.L.McDougall – Carrington Falls pomaderris (N.S.W.)
