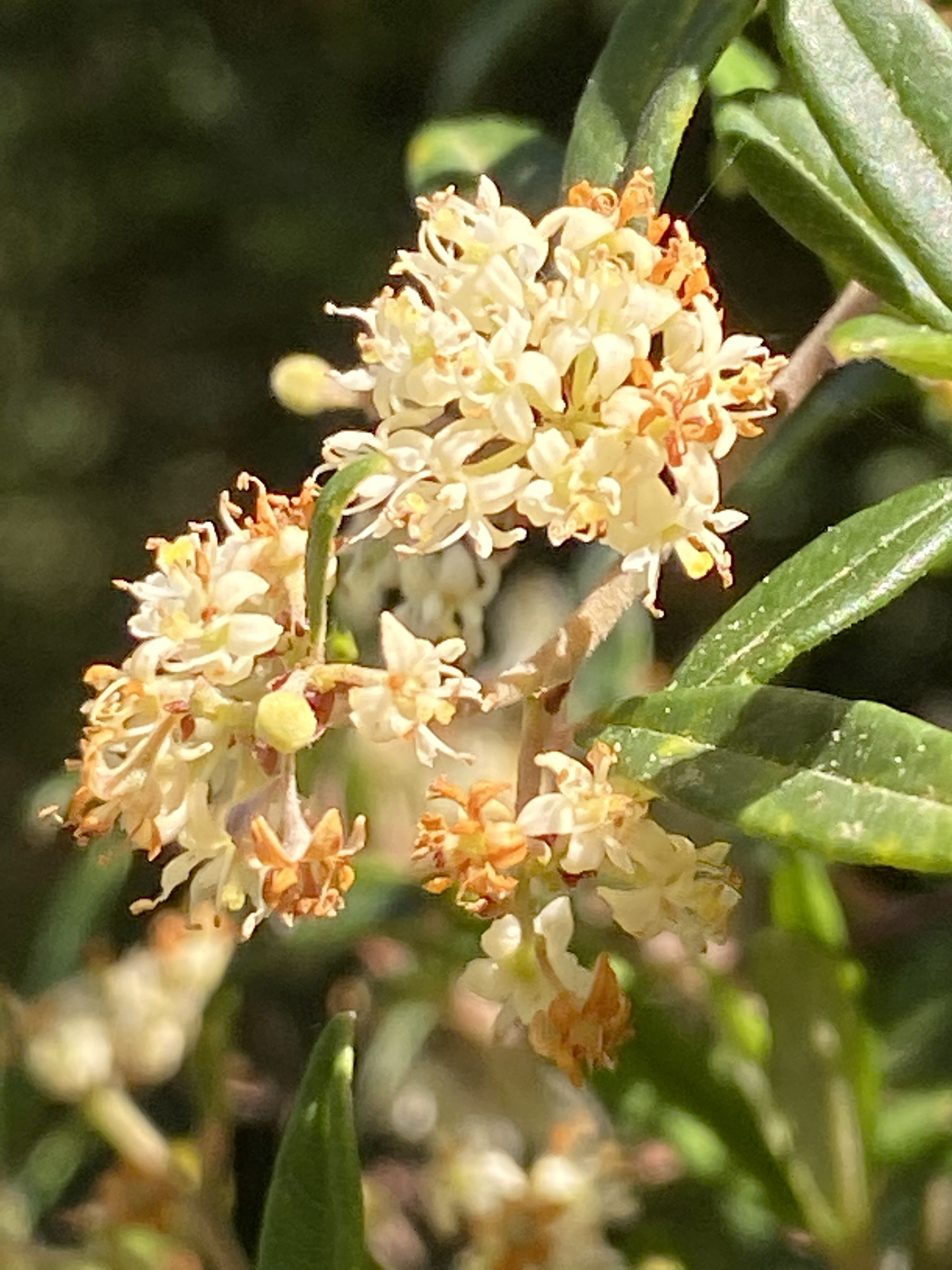
- In Wollongong Botanic Garden

Scientific classification
- Kingdom: Plantae
- Clade: Tracheophytes
- Clade: Angiosperms
- Clade: Eudicots
- Clade: Rosids
- Order: Rosales
- Family: Rhamnaceae
- Genus: Pomaderris
- Species: P. adnata

Binomial name
- Pomaderris adnata N.G.Walsh & Coates

= Pomaderris adnata =

Species of shrub

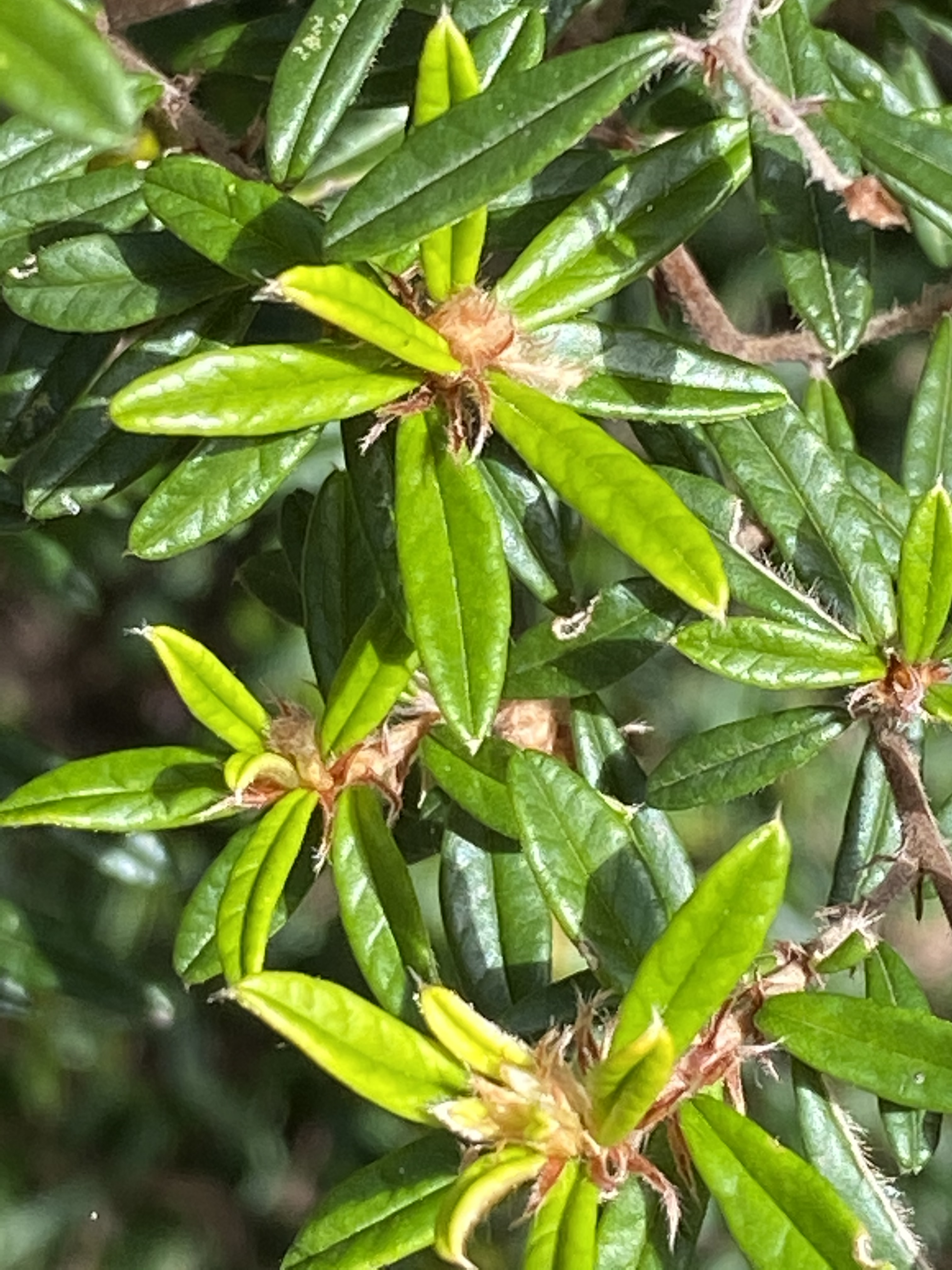
Foliage

Pomaderris adnata is a spreading shrub in the family Rhamnaceae, it is endemic to New South Wales. It has smooth, elliptic or oblanceolate green leaves and pale yellow flowers in spring.

== Description ==
Pomaderris adnata is a spreading shrub 1–2 m (3 ft 3 in – 6 ft 7 in) high with soft, greyish, star shaped hairs on the new growth. The leaves are narrowly oval shaped, 1.5–3 cm (0.59–1.18 in) long, 3–8 cm (1.2–3.1 in) wide, upper side smooth, under side covered in greyish star-shaped hairs, leaf edges curved downward, smooth to more or less with deep, wavy depressions. The flowers are pale yellow, borne in small clusters in leaf axils. The seed capsule is covered in star-shaped hairs. The smaller leaf veins are sparsely covered with flattened, yellowish to rusty or greyish hairs and greyish star-shaped hairs. Flowering occurs in spring.

== Taxonomy ==
Pomaderris adnata was first formally described in 1997 by Neville Grant Walsh and Fiona Coates and the description was published in the journal Muelleria.

== Distribution and habitat ==
This species grows in dry sclerophyll forest and woodland heath at one location, on the escarpment south of Sydney at Sublime Point.

== Conservation status ==
Pomaderris adnata is classified as an endangered species under the New South Wales Biodiversity Conservation Act 2016 (NSW). Threats to its survival include small number of species, dumping of rubbish, road maintenance and weed invasion.
