= Pomaderris notata =

Scientific classification
- Kingdom: Plantae
- Clade: Embryophytes
- Clade: Tracheophytes
- Clade: Spermatophytes
- Clade: Angiosperms
- Clade: Eudicots
- Clade: Rosids
- Order: Rosales
- Family: Rhamnaceae
- Genus: Pomaderris
- Species: P. notata

Binomial name
- Pomaderris notata S.T.Blake

Species of flowering plant

Pomaderris notata, commonly known as McPherson Range pomaderris, is a species of flowering plant in the family Rhamnaceae and is endemic to eastern Australia. It is a shrub with woolly-hairy stems, elliptic leaves, and cream-coloured flowers.

== Description ==
Pomaderris notata is a shrub that typically grows to a height of up to 2 m (6 ft 7 in) and has woolly-hairy young stems. The leaves are elliptic, 30–60 mm (1.2–2.4 in) long and 20–30 mm (0.79–1.18 in) wide, the upper surface of the leaves glabrous and the lower surface covered with short, white to greyish, woolly hairs. The flowers are cream-coloured and arranged in panicles on the ends of branches with bracts 4–5 mm (0.16–0.20 in) long at the base.

== Taxonomy ==
Pomaderris notata was first formally described in 1945 by Stanley Thatcher Blake in The Queensland Naturalist, from specimens he collected in the McPherson Range in 1945. The specific epithet (nitidula) means "marked".

== Distribution and habitat ==
McPherson Range pomaderris grows in heath, scrub or rainforest in rocky places at higher altitudes, mainly in south-eastern Queensland but also in a few isolated populations in northern New South Wales.

== Conservation status ==
This pomaderris is listed as "vulnerable" under the New South Wales Government Biodiversity Conservation Act 2016.
