= Pomaderris oblongifolia =

Scientific classification
- Kingdom: Plantae
- Clade: Tracheophytes
- Clade: Angiosperms
- Clade: Eudicots
- Clade: Rosids
- Order: Rosales
- Family: Rhamnaceae
- Genus: Pomaderris
- Species: P. oblongifolia

Binomial name
- Pomaderris oblongifolia N.G.Walsh

Species of plant

Pomaderris oblongifolia is a species of flowering plant in the family Rhamnaceae and is endemic to eastern Victoria. It is a slender shrub with densely hairy young stems, oblong to narrowly egg-shaped leaves and panicles of hairy, greenish to deep maroon flowers.

== Description ==
Pomaderris oblongifolia is a slender shrub that typically grows to a height of 1–2.5 m (3 ft 3 in – 8 ft 2 in), its young stems densely covered with soft, star-shaped hairs. The leaves are oblong to narrowly egg-shaped, 20–60 mm (0.79–2.36 in) long and 6–15 mm (0.24–0.59 in) wide with egg-shaped stipules 3–5 mm (0.12–0.20 in) long at the base, but that fall off as the leaf develops. The upper surface of the leaves is mostly glabrous and the lower surface is densely covered with soft greyish or rust-coloured, star-shaped hairs. The flowers are borne on or near the ends of branchlets in pyramid-shaped panicles 10–50 mm (0.39–1.97 in) long, each flower on a pedicel 1–3.5 mm (0.039–0.138 in) long. The flowers are greenish to deep maroon and covered with hairs similar to those on the leaves. The petal-like sepals are 1.2–1.7 mm (0.047–0.067 in) long but there are no petals. Flowering occurs from November to January.

== Taxonomy ==
Pomaderris oblongifolia was first formally described in 1990 by Neville Grant Walsh in the journal Muelleria from specimens collected near Buchan in 1988. The specific epithet (oblongifolia) refers to the characteristic oblong leaf shape.

== Distribution and habitat ==
This pomaderris grows in gorges of the Snowy River between McKillops Bridge and Buchan, and in gorges on the nearby Little River in eastern Victoria.
