= Pomaderris subplicata =

Conservation status
- Vulnerable (EPBC Act)

Scientific classification
- Kingdom: Plantae
- Clade: Tracheophytes
- Clade: Angiosperms
- Clade: Eudicots
- Clade: Rosids
- Order: Rosales
- Family: Rhamnaceae
- Genus: Pomaderris
- Species: P. subplicata

Binomial name
- Pomaderris subplicata N.G.Walsh

Species of plant

Pomaderris subplicata, commonly known as concave pomaderris, is a species of flowering plant in the family Rhamnaceae and is endemic to Victoria in Australia. It is a shrub with softly-hairy branchlets, egg-shaped leaves, sometimes with the narrower end towards the base, and small clusters of pale yellow flowers.

== Description ==
Pomaderris subplicata is a shrub that typically grows to a height of 1–2 m (3 ft 3 in – 6 ft 7 in), its branchlets covered with soft, star-shaped hairs. The leaves are egg-shaped, sometimes with the narrower end towards the base, 3–10 mm (0.12–0.39 in) long and 3–6 mm (0.12–0.24 in) wide and often V-shaped in cross-section. Both surfaces of the leaves are covered with soft, star-shaped hairs. There are stipules 1–2 mm (0.039–0.079 in) long at the base of the leaves, but that fall off as the leaf matures. The flowers are borne in small clusters in leaf axils near the ends of branchlets, each flower pale yellow on a pedicel 1.0–2.5 mm (0.039–0.098 in). The sepals are 1.5–1.8 mm (0.059–0.071 in) long, and fall off as the flower matures and the petals are 0.5–1.0 mm (0.020–0.039 in) long but fall off as the flowers open. Flowering occurs in October.

== Taxonomy ==
Pomaderris subplicata was first formally described in 1992 by Neville Grant Walsh in the journal Muelleria from specimens Walsh collected near Carboor Upper in north-east Victoria in 1990. The specific epithet (subplicata) means "somewhat folded", referring to the leaves.

== Distribution and habitat ==
Concave pomaderris grows in woodland and shrubby forest on shallow soil in three locations south-east of Wangaratta in north-eastern Victoria.

== Conservation status ==
Pomaderris subplicata is classified as "vulnerable" under the Australian Government Environment Protection and Biodiversity Conservation Act and the Victorian Government Flora and Fauna Guarantee Act 1988, and a National Recovery Plan has been prepared. The main threats to the species include its small population size, weed invasion and grazing by rabbits and native herbivores.
