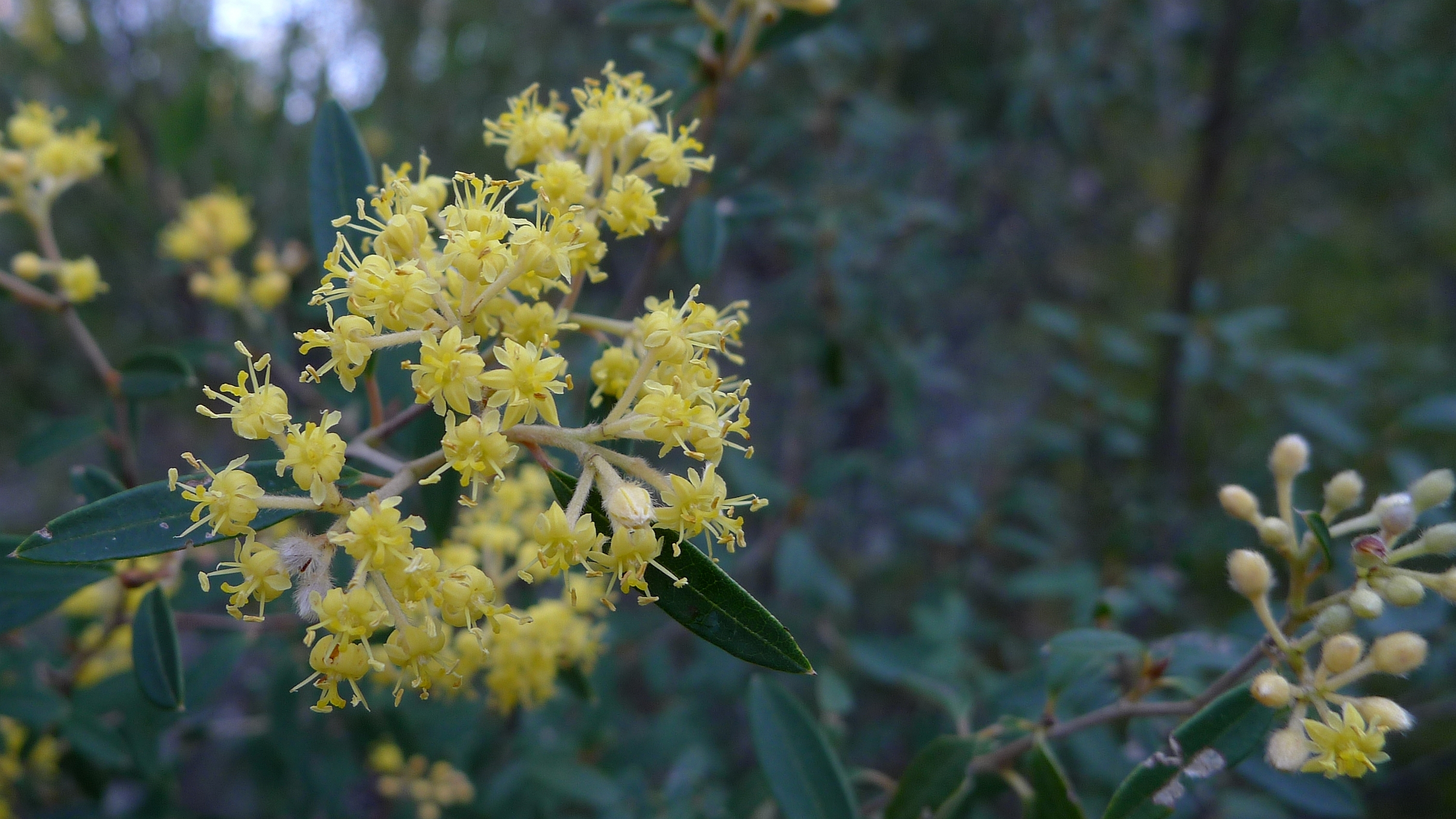
- In Heathcote National Park

Scientific classification
- Kingdom: Plantae
- Clade: Tracheophytes
- Clade: Angiosperms
- Clade: Eudicots
- Clade: Rosids
- Order: Rosales
- Family: Rhamnaceae
- Genus: Pomaderris
- Species: P. andromedifolia

Binomial name
- Pomaderris andromedifolia A.Cunn.

= Pomaderris andromedifolia =

Species of shrub

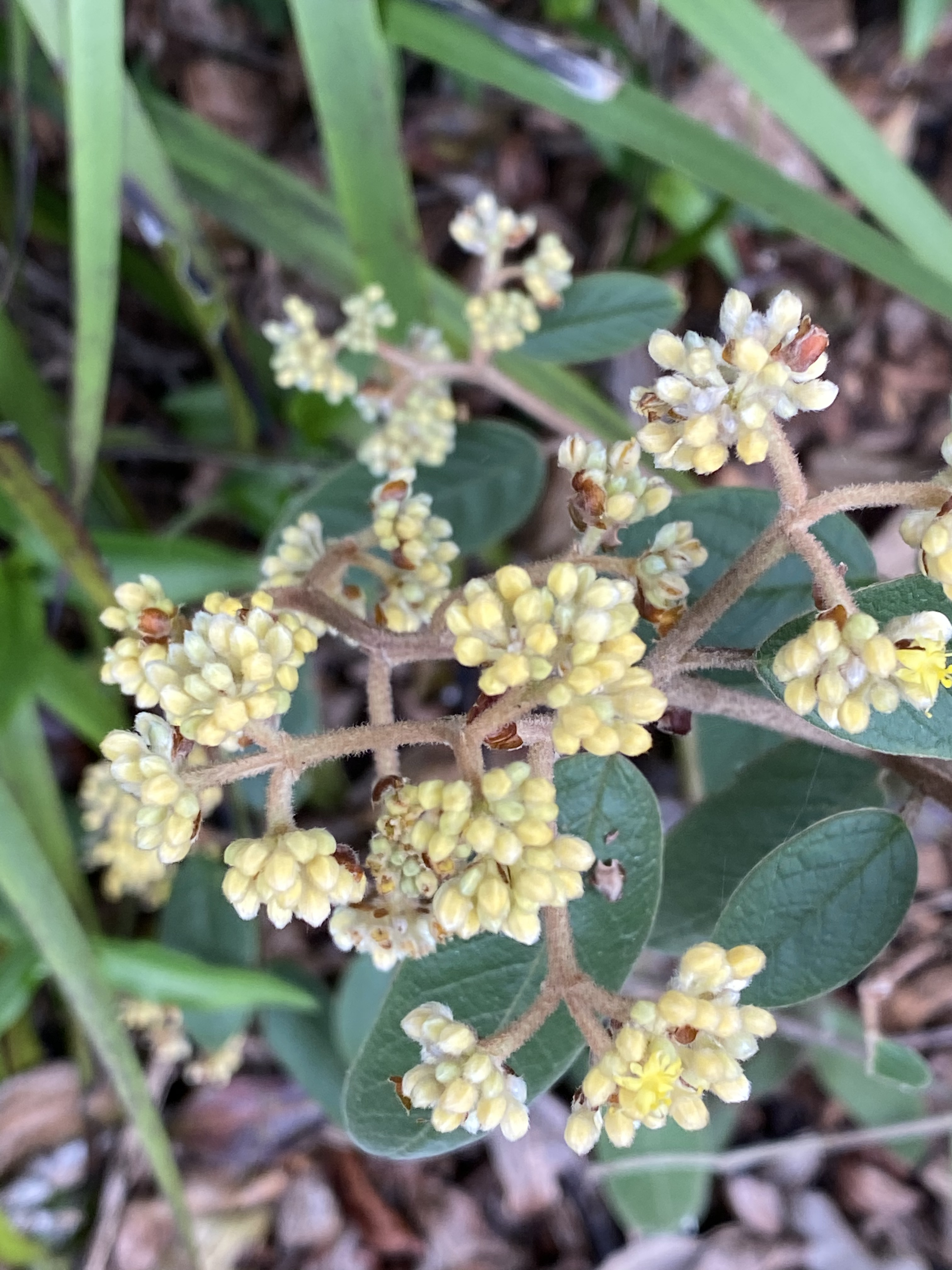
Flower buds in the Australian National Botanic Gardens

Pomaderris andromedifolia is a species of flowering plant in the family Rhamnaceae and is endemic to south-eastern continental Australia. It is a shrub with lance-shaped to elliptic leaves and cream-coloured to yellow flowers.

== Description ==
Pomaderris andromedifolia is a shrub that typically grows to a height of 1–2 m (3 ft 3 in – 6 ft 7 in) and has its young stems covered with woolly, rust-coloured hairs. The leaves are mostly lance-shaped to elliptic, 10–50 mm (0.39–1.97 in) long and 3–15 mm (0.12–0.59 in) wide, the upper surface glabrous and the lower surface with white to rust-coloured hairs. The flowers are borne in panicles on the end of branches and are cream-coloured to pale yellow, each flower on a pedicel 1.5–4 mm (0.059–0.157 in) long. The sepals are 2.0–2.5 mm (0.079–0.098 in) long but fall off as the flowers mature, the petals spatula-shaped and 1.5–2.5 mm (0.059–0.098 in) long. Flowering occurs from September to November.

== Taxonomy ==
Pomaderris andromedifolia was first formally described in 1825 by Allan Cunningham and the description was published in Barron Field's Geographical Memoirs on New South Wales. The specific epithet (andromedifolia) refers to a similarity of the leaves of this species to those of the bog rosemary, Andromeda.

In 1997, Neville Walsh described two subspecies of P. andromedifolia and the names are accepted by the Australian Plant Census:

- Pomaderris andromedifolia A.Cunn. subsp. andromedifolia has straight hairs between the veins on the lower surface of the leaves and bracts that fall before the flowers open;
- Pomaderris andromedifolia subsp. confusa N.G.Walsh & Coates has curved or wavy hairs between the veins on the lower surface of the leaves and bracts that remain until flowering occurs.

== Distribution and habitat ==
Subspecies andromedifolia mainly grows in forest along the coast and tablelands from south-east Queensland, through New South Wales to far north-eastern Victoria, but subspecies confusa is only known from south-eastern New South Wales and from collections in 2019 near Mallacoota in far north-eastern Victoria.
