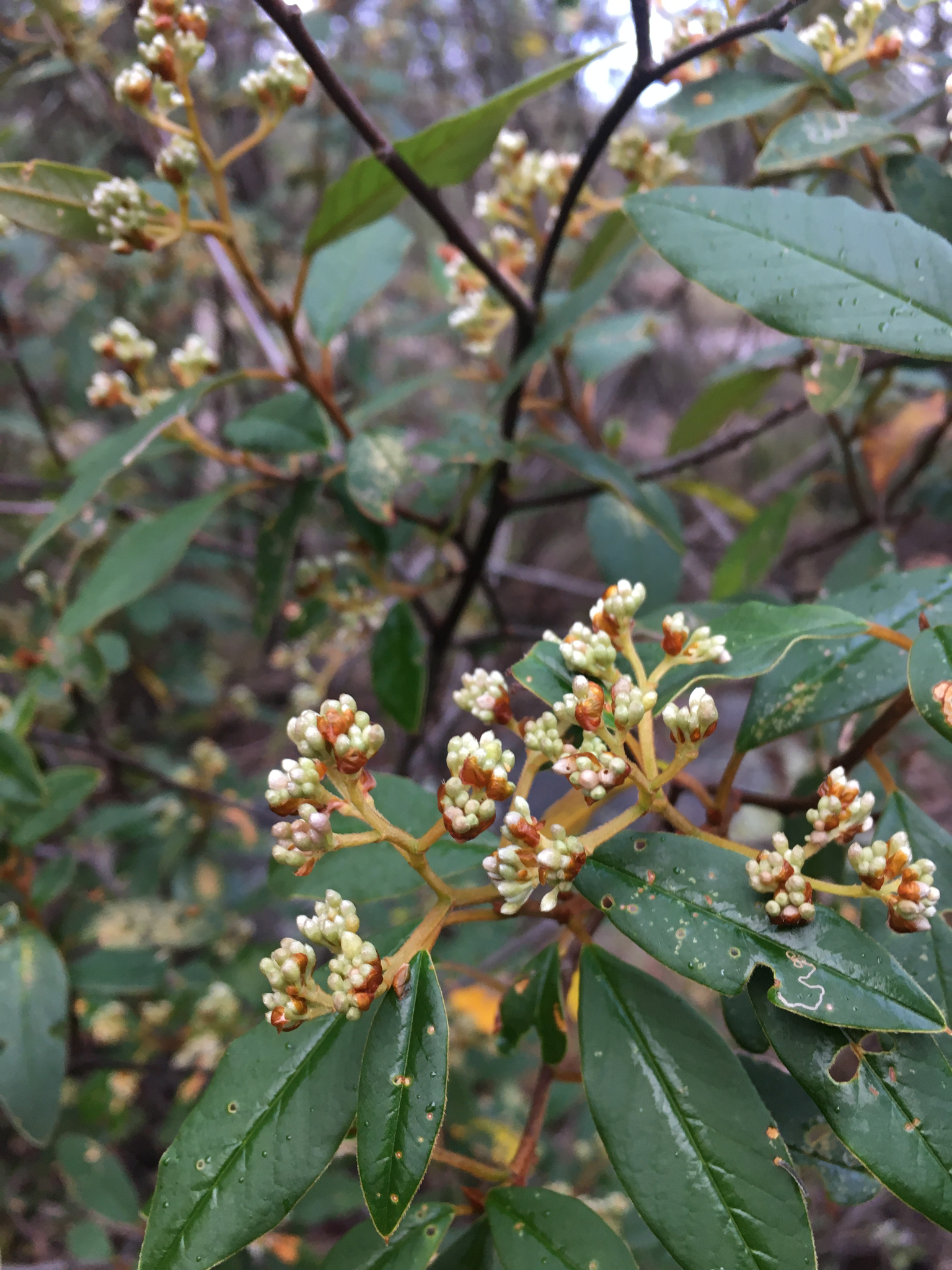
- Pomaderris nitidula near Ballandean

Scientific classification
- Kingdom: Plantae
- Clade: Tracheophytes
- Clade: Angiosperms
- Clade: Eudicots
- Clade: Rosids
- Order: Rosales
- Family: Rhamnaceae
- Genus: Pomaderris
- Species: P. nitidula

Binomial name
- Pomaderris nitidula (Benth.) N.A.Wakef.

Synonyms
- Pommaderris phillyreoides var. nitidula Benth.

= Pomaderris nitidula =

Shining pomaderris

Species of flowering plant

Pomaderris nitidula, commonly known as shining pomaderris, is a species of flowering plant in the family Rhamnaceae and is endemic to eastern Australia. It is a shrub with silky-hairy young stems, elliptic to narrowly elliptic leaves, and cream-coloured flowers.

== Description ==
Pomaderris nitidula is a shrub that typically grows to a height of up to 1.5 m (4 ft 11 in), its new growth and young stems covered with copper-coloured, silky hairs. The leaves are elliptic to narrowly elliptic, 30–70 mm (1.2–2.8 in) long and 10–25 mm (0.39–0.98 in) wide, the upper surface of the leaves glabrous and the lower surface covered with silky, silvery hairs. The flowers are cream-coloured and arranged in small groups in panicles.

== Taxonomy ==
Shining pomaderris was first formally described in 1863 by George Bentham who gave it the name Pomaderris phillyreoidesin var. nitidula in Flora Australiensis. In 1951, Norman Arthur Wakefield raised the variety to species status as Pomaderris nitidula. The specific epithet (nitidula) is the diminutive form of the Latin word nitidus, meaning "shining" or "bright", hence "somewhat shining".

== Distribution and habitat ==
Pomaderris nitidula grows in forest, woodland or scrub in rocky places, usually at higher altitudes and occurs in far south-eastern Queensland and as far south as Mount Seaview in New South Wales.
