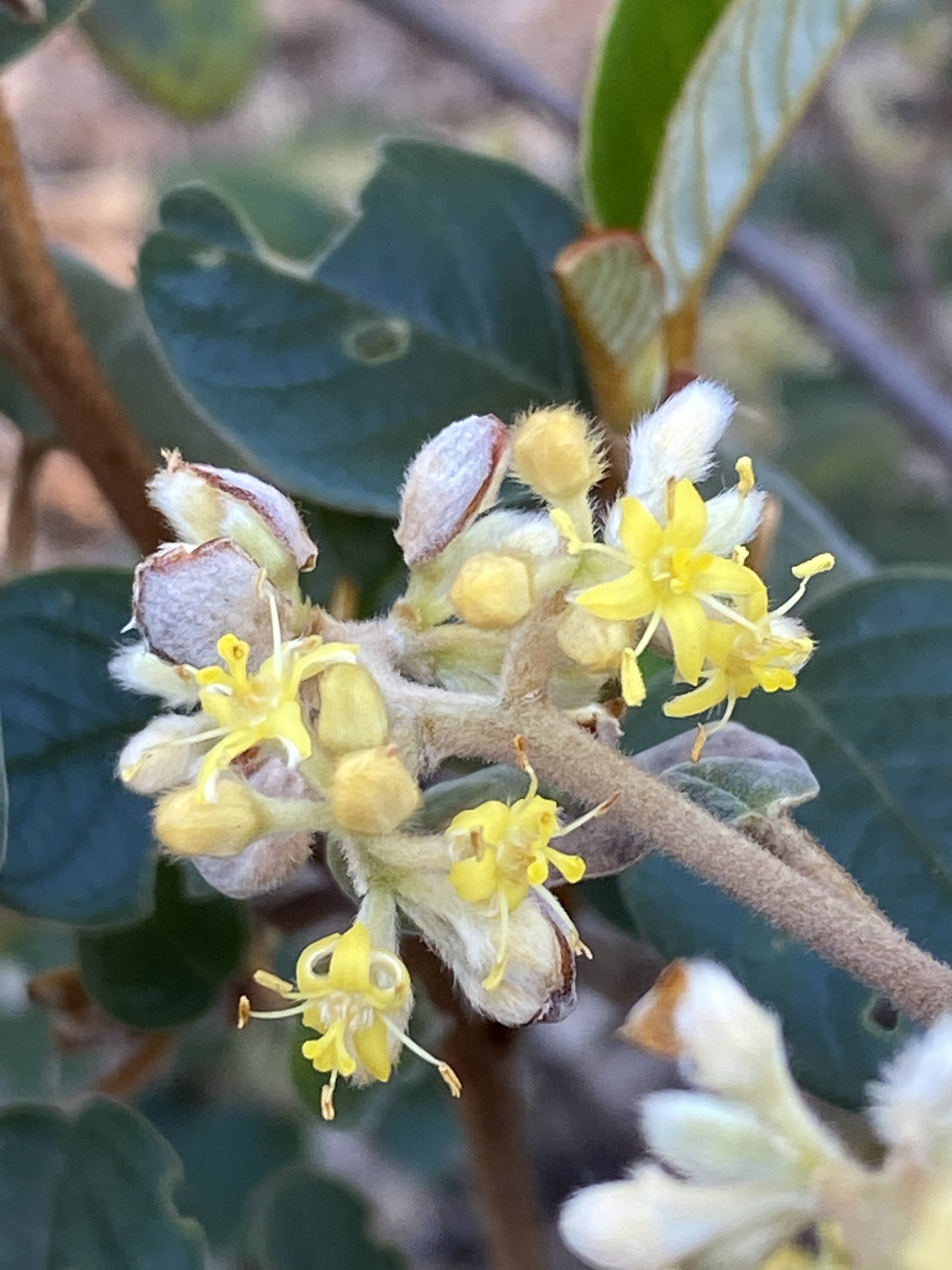
- In the Australian National Botanic Gardens

Conservation status
- Critically endangered (EPBC Act)

Scientific classification
- Kingdom: Plantae
- Clade: Tracheophytes
- Clade: Angiosperms
- Clade: Eudicots
- Clade: Rosids
- Order: Rosales
- Family: Rhamnaceae
- Genus: Pomaderris
- Species: P. reperta

Binomial name
- Pomaderris reperta N.G.Walsh & Coates

= Pomaderris reperta =

Species of plant

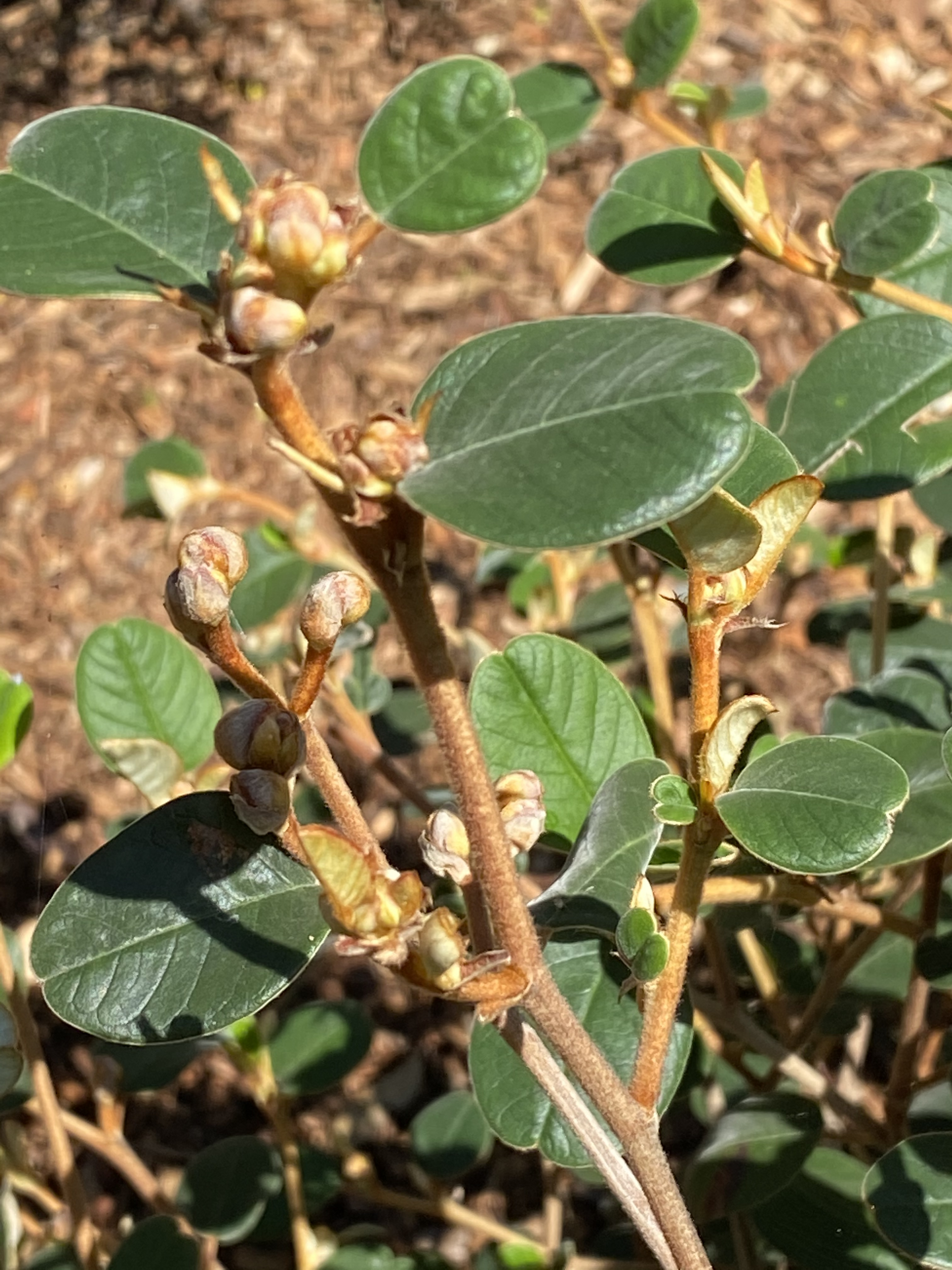
Foliage and buds

Pomaderris reperta, commonly known as Denman pomaderris, is a species of flowering plant in the family Rhamnaceae and is endemic to a restricted area of New South Wales. It is a shrub with densely rusty-hairy new growth, egg-shaped to elliptic leaves, and dense panicles of cream-coloured flowers.

== Description ==
Pomaderris reperta is a shrub that typically grows to a height of 1–3 m (3 ft 3 in – 9 ft 10 in), its new growth densely covered with shaggy, rust-coloured, simple and star-shaped hairs. The leaves are elliptic to broadly elliptic or egg-shaped to broadly egg-shaped with the narrower end towards the base, 10–35 mm (0.39–1.38 in) long and 8–20 mm (0.31–0.79 in) wide on a petiole 3–10 mm (0.12–0.39 in) long with egg-shaped stipules 3–5 mm (0.12–0.20 in) long at the base, but that fall off as the leaf develops. The upper surface of the leaves is covered with short, velvety hairs and the lower surface is densely covered with white or greyish, star-shaped hairs. The flowers are borne in short, dense panicles 30–40 mm (1.2–1.6 in) long with ten to thirty cream-coloured flowers densely covered with silvery or pale rusty simple hairs and greyish star-shaped hairs on the back. Each flower is borne on a pedicel 1.5–3 mm (0.059–0.118 in) long, the sepals 2.3–2.8 mm (0.091–0.110 in) long, and there are usually no petals. Flowering occurs in October and the fruit is dark, greyish brown and about 3.5 mm (0.14 in) long.

== Taxonomy ==
Pomaderris reperta was first formally described in 1997 by Neville Grant Walsh and Fiona Coates in the journal Muelleria from specimens collected by Peter Craig Jobson near Denman in 1995. The specific epithet (reperta) means "to rediscover", referring its not having been seen between 1961 and 1995.

== Distribution and habitat ==
Denman pomaderris grows in woodland on soil derived from sandstone near Denman in the upper Hunter Valley of New South Wales.

== Conservation status ==
Pomaderris reperta is listed as "critically endangered" under the Australian Government Environment Protection and Biodiversity Conservation Act 1999 and the New South Wales Government Biodiversity Conservation Act 2016. The main threats to the species include its small population size and limited distribution and drought.
