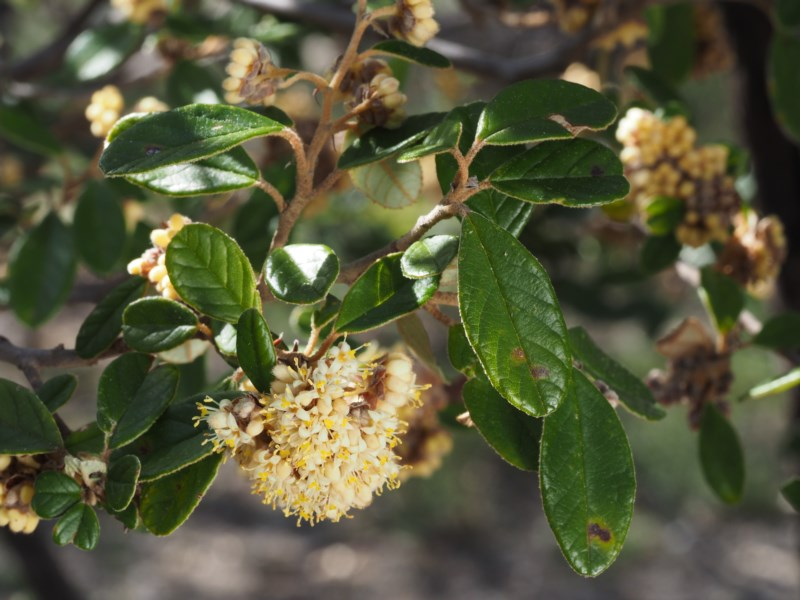
- Near Paddys River, A.C.T.

Scientific classification
- Kingdom: Plantae
- Clade: Tracheophytes
- Clade: Angiosperms
- Clade: Eudicots
- Clade: Rosids
- Order: Rosales
- Family: Rhamnaceae
- Genus: Pomaderris
- Species: P. betulina

Binomial name
- Pomaderris betulina A.Cunn. ex Hook.

= Pomaderris betulina =

Birch pomaderris

Species of shrub

Pomaderris betulina, commonly known as birch pomaderris, is a species of flowering plant in the family Rhamnaceae and is endemic to south-eastern continental Australia. It is a shrub with hairy young stems, lance-shaped to oblong or elliptic leaves, and yellowish flowers.

== Description ==
Pomaderris betulina is a shrub that typically grows to a height of 1–4 m (3 ft 3 in – 13 ft 1 in), its young stems covered with woolly, rust-coloured, star-shaped hairs. The leaves are lance-shaped to more or less oblong to elliptic, 15–30 mm (0.59–1.18 in) long and 5–15 mm (0.20–0.59 in) wide, the upper surface usually glabrous and the lower surface with woolly, white to rust-coloured hairs. The flowers are borne in panicles, including clusters of flowers about 10 mm (0.39 in) in diameter. The flowers are yellowish, each flower on a pedicel up to 1 mm (0.039 in) long. The sepals are 1.5–2.5 mm (0.059–0.098 in) long but fall off as the flowers mature and there are no petals. Flowering occurs from October to November.

== Taxonomy ==
Pomaderris betulina was first formally described in 1833 by William Jackson Hooker from an unpublished description by Allan Cunningham and the description was published in the Botanical Magazine. The specific epithet (betulina) refers to a similarity of the leaves of this species to those of birch genus, Betula.

In 1997, Neville Walsh and Fiona Coates described two subspecies of P. betulina and the names are accepted by the Australian Plant Census:

- Pomaderris betulina N.G.Walsh & Coates subsp. actensis has leaves that are more or less flat, and sepals 2.0–2.5 mm (0.079–0.098 in) long;
- Pomaderris betulina subsp. betulina A.Cunn. ex Hook. has leaves with the edges usually curved downwards, and sepals 1.5–2.0 mm (0.059–0.079 in) long.

== Distribution and habitat ==
Birch pomaderris grows in forest, woodland and shrubland, often near streams, from near Torrington in New South Wales to north-eastern Victoria. Subspecies actensis is restricted to a few locations in the Australian Capital Territory and to near Burrinjuck in New South Wales.
