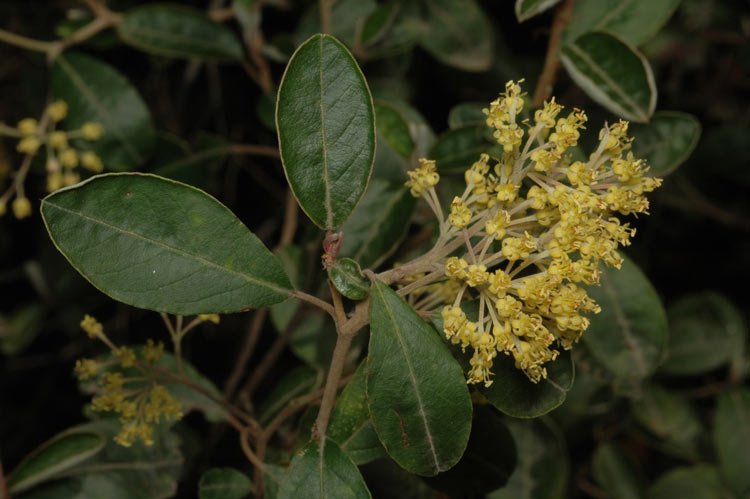
- Pomaderris aurea in the ANBG

Scientific classification
- Kingdom: Plantae
- Clade: Tracheophytes
- Clade: Angiosperms
- Clade: Eudicots
- Clade: Rosids
- Order: Rosales
- Family: Rhamnaceae
- Genus: Pomaderris
- Species: P. aurea

Binomial name
- Pomaderris aurea N.A.Wakef.

= Pomaderris aurea =

Species of shrub

Pomaderris aurea is a species of flowering plant in the family Rhamnaceae and is endemic to Victoria, Australia. It is a shrub with hairy branchlets, egg-shaped or elliptic leaves and panicles of golden yellow flowers.

== Description ==
Pomaderris aurea is a shrub that typically grows to a height of 0.5–2 m (1 ft 8 in – 6 ft 7 in), its branchlets covered with soft grey or rust-coloured hairs. The leaves are egg-shaped or elliptic, 15–50 mm (0.59–1.97 in) long and 8–20 mm (0.31–0.79 in) wide with stipules 4–9 mm (0.16–0.35 in) long at the base, the lower surface covered with star-shaped hairs. The flowers are borne in rounded to pyramid-shaped panicles 30–50 mm (1.2–2.0 in) wide, and are golden yellow, each flower on a pedicel about 2–3 mm (0.079–0.118 in) long. The sepals are 2.0–2.5 mm (0.079–0.098 in) long but fall off as the flower opens and the petals are spatula-shaped and 1.5–2.0 mm (0.059–0.079 in) long. Flowering occurs from September to October.

== Taxonomy ==
Pomaderris aurea was first formally described in 1951 by Norman Arthur Wakefield in The Victorian Naturalist from specimens he collected near the upper Genoa River in 1949. The specific epithet (aurea) means "golden".

== Distribution and habitat ==
This pomaderris grows in forest and woodland in the north and east of Victoria.

== Use in horticulture ==
Pomaderris aurea can be propagated from seed, although the seed is difficult to collect, or from cuttings, although usually very slow to strike. The species is floriferous, has attractive foliage, grows well in full sun in well-drained soil, and is at least moderately frost-tolerant.
