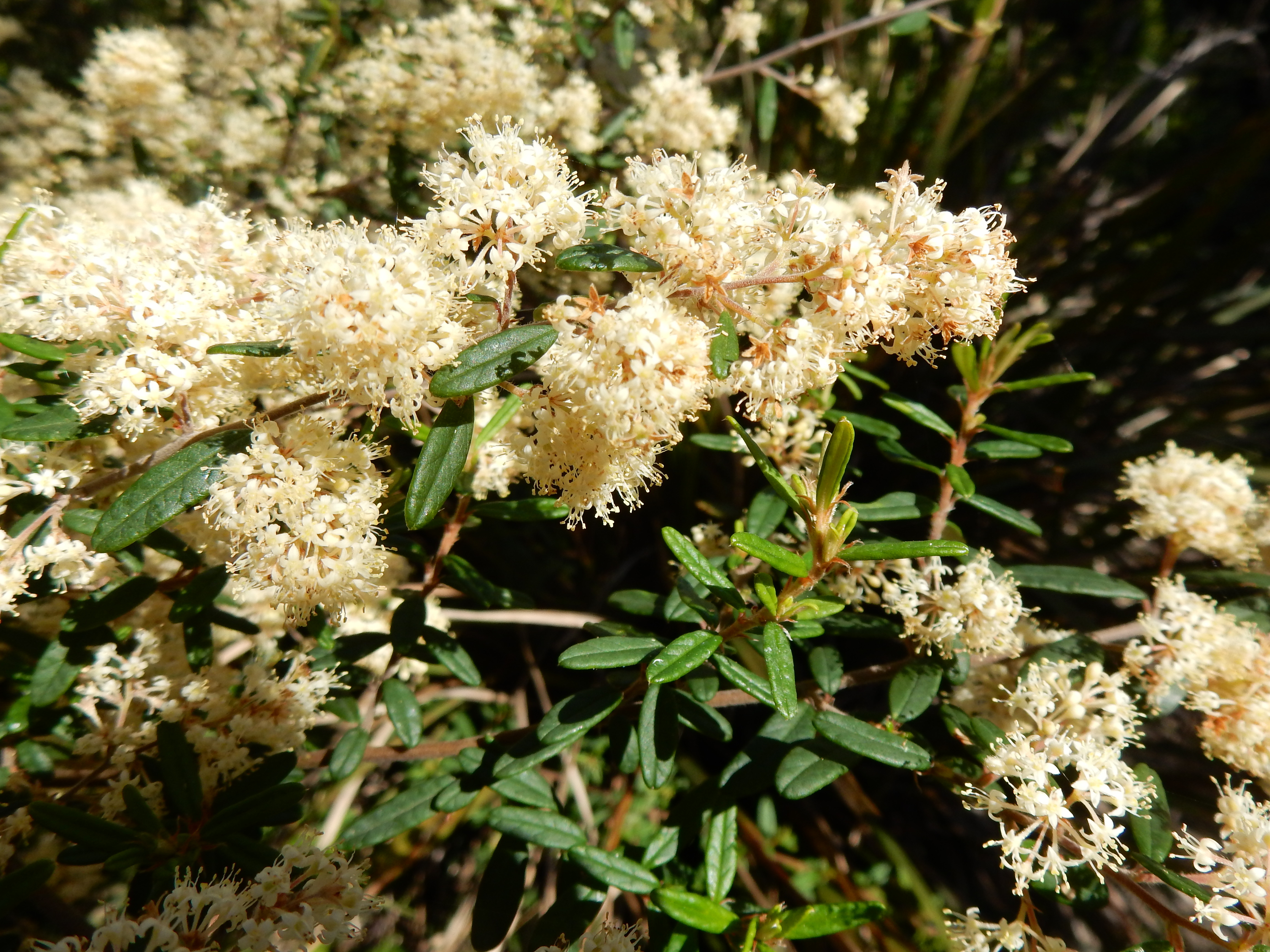
- At Turimetta Beach, Australia

Scientific classification
- Kingdom: Plantae
- Clade: Tracheophytes
- Clade: Angiosperms
- Clade: Eudicots
- Clade: Rosids
- Order: Rosales
- Family: Rhamnaceae
- Genus: Pomaderris
- Species: P. mediora

Binomial name
- Pomaderris mediora N.G.Walsh & Coates

= Pomaderris mediora =

Species of plant

Pomaderris mediora is a species of flowering plant in the family Rhamnaceae and is endemic to the central coast of New South Wales. It is a low-lying or erect shrub with hairy new growth, narrowly elliptic to lance-shaped leaves with the narrower end towards the base, and panicles of cream-coloured flowers.

== Description ==
Pomaderris mediora is a low-lying or erect shrub that typically grows to a height of 1–3 m (3 ft 3 in – 9 ft 10 in), its new growth covered with shaggy, greyish to rust-coloured simple and star-shaped hairs. The leaves are narrowly elliptic to lance-shaped with the narrower end towards the base, 10–20 mm (0.39–0.79 in) long and 1.5–5 mm (0.059–0.197 in) wide on a petiole 1.5–3 mm (0.059–0.118 in) long with egg-shaped stipules 1–4 mm (0.039–0.157 in) long at the base, but that fall off as the leaf develops. The upper surface of the leaves is glabrous and the lower surface is densely covered with greyish to rust-coloured hairs. The flowers are borne in pyramid-shaped panicles 20–80 mm (0.79–3.15 in) long with 50 to 100 cream-coloured flowers, each on a pedicel 1–3 mm (0.039–0.118 in) long and covered with hairs similar to those on the leaves. The sepals are 1.0–1.5 mm (0.039–0.059 in) long but there are no petals. Flowering occurs in September and October and the fruit is 2.5–3.0 mm (0.098–0.118 in) long.

== Taxonomy ==
Pomaderris mediora was first formally described in 1997 by Neville Grant Walsh and Fiona Coates in the journal Muelleria from specimens Walsh collected on Turimetta Head in 1994. The specific epithet (meridora) means "middle coast", referring to the species' distribution on the central coast.

== Distribution and habitat ==
This pomaderris grows in heath and scrub on ridges and headlands in Narrabeen sandstone and shale from the mouth of the Hawkesbury River to Bulli.
