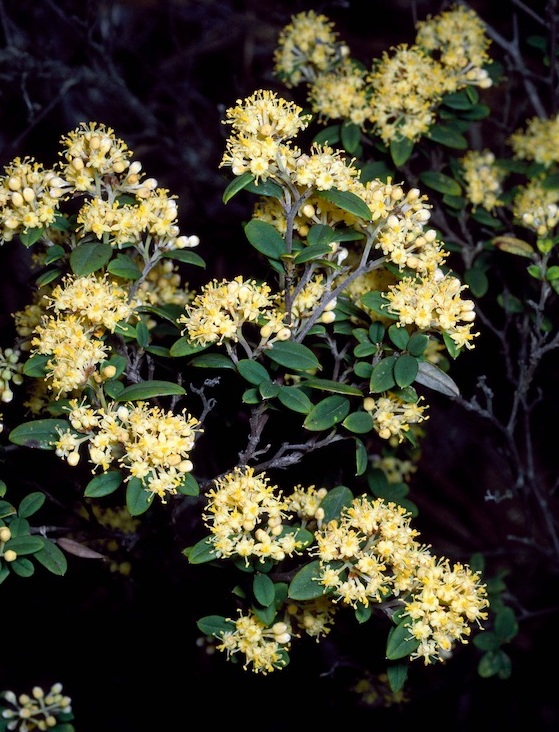
- Pomaderris ledifolia in the ANBG

Scientific classification
- Kingdom: Plantae
- Clade: Tracheophytes
- Clade: Angiosperms
- Clade: Eudicots
- Clade: Rosids
- Order: Rosales
- Family: Rhamnaceae
- Genus: Pomaderris
- Species: P. ledifolia

Binomial name
- Pomaderris ledifolia A.Cunn.

Synonyms
- Pomaderris calvertiana F.Muell.; Pomaderris ledifolia A.Cunn. var. ledifolia

= Pomaderris ledifolia =

Sydney pomaderris

Species of flowering plant

Pomaderris ledifolia, commonly known as Sydney pomaderris, is a species of flowering plant in the family Rhamnaceae and is endemic to south-eastern continental Australia. It is an erect, delicate shrub with hairy young stems, narrowly elliptic to lance-shaped leaves, and compact clusters of yellow flowers.

== Description ==
Pomaderris ledifolia is an erect, delicate shrub that typically grows to a height of 1–2 m (3 ft 3 in – 6 ft 7 in), its young branchlets covered with greyish or rust-coloured hairs. The leaves are narrowly elliptic to lance-shaped, 6–25 mm (0.24–0.98 in) long and 2–4 mm (0.079–0.157 in) wide with stipules 0.8–1.5 mm (0.031–0.059 in) long at the base but that fall off as the leaf develops. The upper surface of the leaves is glabrous and the lower surface is covered with greyish hairs. The flowers are arranged in groups of two to twenty, 10–25 mm (0.39–0.98 in) wide and are yellow, each flower on a pedicel 2–4 mm (0.079–0.157 in) long with soft hairs on the back. The sepals are 2.0–2.5 mm (0.079–0.098 in) long but fall off as the flowers open, and the petals are narrowly spatula-shaped and 1.5–2.0 mm (0.059–0.079 in) long. Flowering occurs from September to November.

== Taxonomy ==
Pomaderris ledifoliawas first formally described in 1825 by Allan Cunningham in Barron Field's Geographical Memoirs on New South Wales. The specific epithet (ledifolia) means "Ledum-leaved".

== Distribution and habitat ==
Sydney pomaderris is widespread on the coast and tablelands of New South Wales where it is usually found on rocky hillsides, but also occurs in south-east Queensland and in the far north-east of Victoria.
