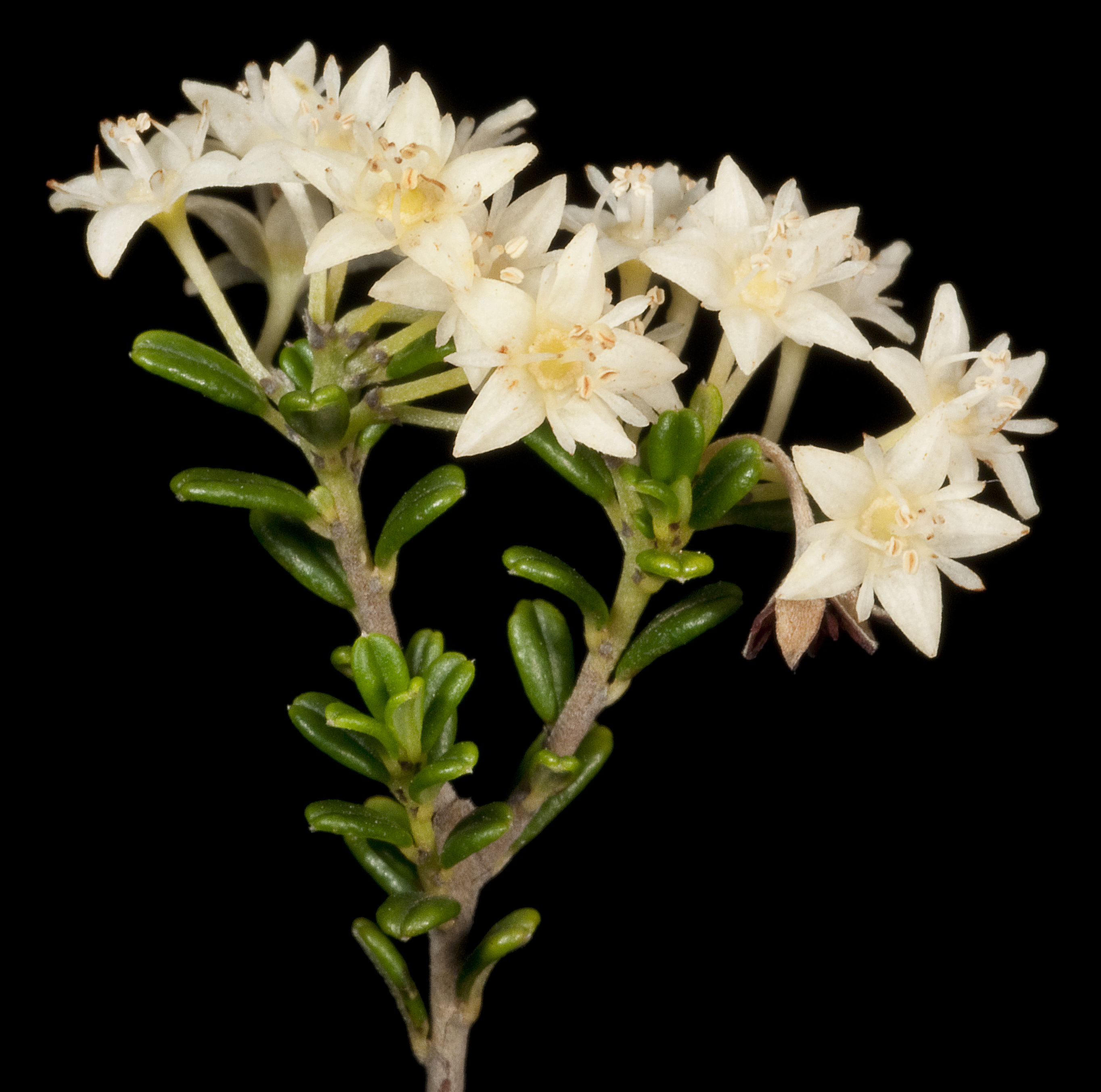

Scientific classification
- Kingdom: Plantae
- Clade: Tracheophytes
- Clade: Angiosperms
- Clade: Eudicots
- Clade: Rosids
- Order: Rosales
- Family: Rhamnaceae
- Genus: Pomaderris
- Species: P. brevifolia

Binomial name
- Pomaderris brevifolia N.G.Walsh

= Pomaderris brevifolia =

Species of shrub

Pomaderris brevifolia is a species of flowering plant in the family Rhamnaceae and is endemic to the south of Western Australia. It is a slender shrub with silky-hairy young branchlets, wedge-shaped, heart-shaped or egg-shaped leaves with the narrower end towards the base, and clusters of ten to twenty cream-coloured to pale pink flowers.

== Description ==
Pomaderris brevifolia is a slender shrub that typically grows to a height of up to 1.5 m (4 ft 11 in), its young branchlets covered with short, silky hairs. The leaves are wedge-shaped, heart-shaped or egg-shaped with the narrower end towards the base, 3–7 mm (0.12–0.28 in) long and 2–4 mm (0.079–0.157 in) wide, the upper surface more or less glabrous and the lower surface densely covered with star-shaped hairs. The flowers are cream-coloured to pale pink and borne in clusters of ten to twenty that are up to 15 mm (0.59 in) wide, each flower on a pedicel 2–5 mm (0.079–0.197 in) long with stipule-like bracts at the base. The sepals are 1.3–2.0 mm (0.051–0.079 in) long and silky-hairy on the lower surface. The petals are 0.8–1.2 mm (0.031–0.047 in) long and the stamens are slightly longer than the petals. Flowering mainly occurs from January to August.

== Taxonomy ==
Pomaderris brevifolia was first formally described in 1994 by Neville Grant Walsh in the journal Muelleria from specimens collected by Alex George in 1970. The specific epithet (brevifolia) means "small leaves", since this species has the smallest leaves of any Western Australian pomaderris.

== Distribution and habitat ==
This pomaderris grows in mallee scrub and heath, often between rocks, usually in sheltered places, mainly from near Bluff Knoll to Israelite Bay in the Esperance Plains and Mallee biogeographic regions in the south of Western Australia.

== Conservation status ==
Pomaderris brevifolia is listed as "not threatened" by the Government of Western Australia Department of Biodiversity, Conservation and Attractions.
