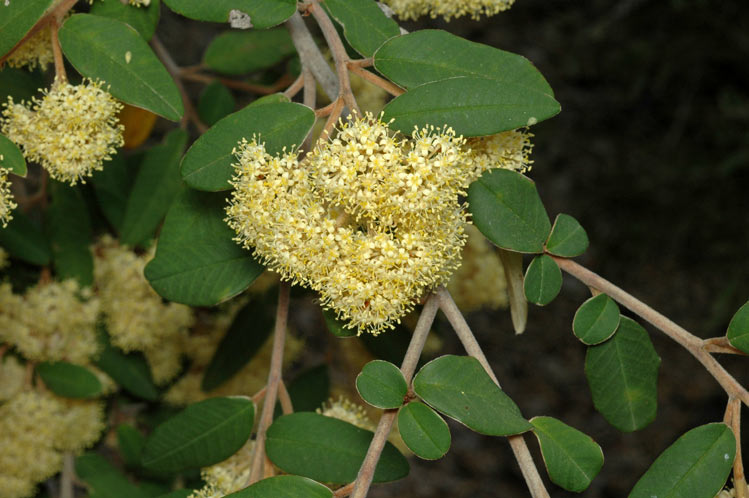
- In the Australian National Botanic Gardens

Scientific classification
- Kingdom: Plantae
- Clade: Tracheophytes
- Clade: Angiosperms
- Clade: Eudicots
- Clade: Rosids
- Order: Rosales
- Family: Rhamnaceae
- Genus: Pomaderris
- Species: P. costata

Binomial name
- Pomaderris costata N.A.Wakef.

= Pomaderris costata =

Species of flowering plant

Pomaderris costata is a species of flowering plant in the family Rhamnaceae and is endemic to south-eastern continental Australia. It is a spreading shrub with densely hairy branchlets, egg-shaped to elliptic leaves, and panicles of cream-coloured or white flowers.

== Description ==
Pomaderris costata is a spreading shrub that typically grows to a height of 1–4 m (3 ft 3 in – 13 ft 1 in), its branchlets densely covered with rust-coloured simple and star-shaped hairs. The leaves are egg-shaped to elliptic, 25–50 mm (0.98–1.97 in) long and 15–35 mm (0.59–1.38 in) wide, the upper surface glabrous and the lower surface densely covered with soft, golden-brown hairs. The flowers are cream-coloured or white and borne in dense, more or less pyramid-shaped panicles 30–50 mm (1.2–2.0 in) long, each flower on a pedicel 1.5–3 mm (0.059–0.118 in) long. The sepals are 1.2–1.8 mm (0.047–0.071 in) long but fall off as the flowers open, and there are no petals. Flowering occurs in October and November and the fruit is a hairy capsule.

== Taxonomy ==
Pomaderris costata was first formally described in 1951 by Norman Arthur Wakefield in The Victorian Naturalist from specimens he collected near the Brodribb River in 1947. The specific epithet (costata) means "ribbed".

== Distribution and habitat ==
This pomaderris grows in open forest and shrubland, often in rocky places and is found in the far north-east of Victoria and the far south-east of New South Wales. It is rare in both states.
