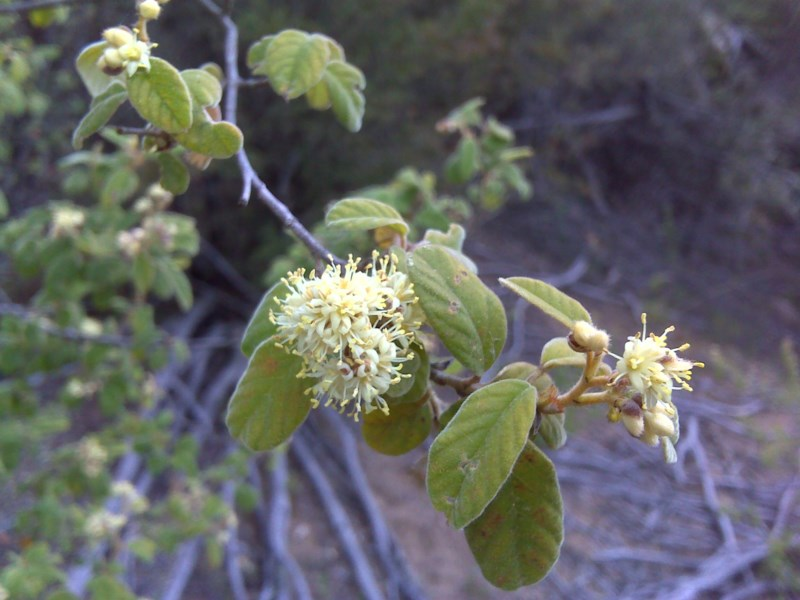
- Near the Cotter Dam

Scientific classification
- Kingdom: Plantae
- Clade: Tracheophytes
- Clade: Angiosperms
- Clade: Eudicots
- Clade: Rosids
- Order: Rosales
- Family: Rhamnaceae
- Genus: Pomaderris
- Species: P. subcapitata

Binomial name
- Pomaderris subcapitata N.A.Wakef.

= Pomaderris subcapitata =

Species of plant

Pomaderris subcapitata is a species of flowering plant in the family Rhamnaceae and is endemic to south-eastern continental Australia. It is a shrub with hairy stems, elliptic to egg-shaped leaves and dense clusters of cream-coloured or yellow flowers.

== Description ==
Pomaderris subcapitata is a shrub that typically grows to a height of 2–4 m (6 ft 7 in – 13 ft 1 in), its stems covered with woolly, whitish, star-shaped hairs and longer simple, rust-coloured hairs. The leaves are elliptic to egg-shaped with the narrower end towards the base, 7–17 mm (0.28–0.67 in) long and 5–10 mm (0.20–0.39 in) wide with stipules 3–7 mm (0.12–0.28 in) long at the base, but that fall off as the leaves age. The upper surface of the leaves is velvet-hairy with impressed veins, the lower surface with hairs like those on the stems. The flowers are cream-coloured to yellow, borne in dense clusters 20–50 mm (0.79–1.97 in) long and wide, each flower on a pedicel 1–2 mm (0.039–0.079 in) long. The floral cup and sepals are covered with whitish simple and grey star-shaped hairs. The sepals are 2.0–2.5 mm (0.079–0.098 in) long but fall off as the flowers open and the petals, when present, are spatula-shaped and 1.5–2.5 mm (0.059–0.098 in) long. Flowering occurs from September to November and the fruit is a hairy capsule.

== Taxonomy ==
Pomaderris subcapitata was first formally described in 1951 by Norman Arthur Wakefield in The Victorian Naturalist from specimens collected in 1900.

== Distribution and habitat ==
This pomaderris grows in forest woodland and heath, usually in rocky places, in scattered places in New South Wales and the Australian Capital Territory, mainly south of Yerranderie, and in eastern Victoria.
