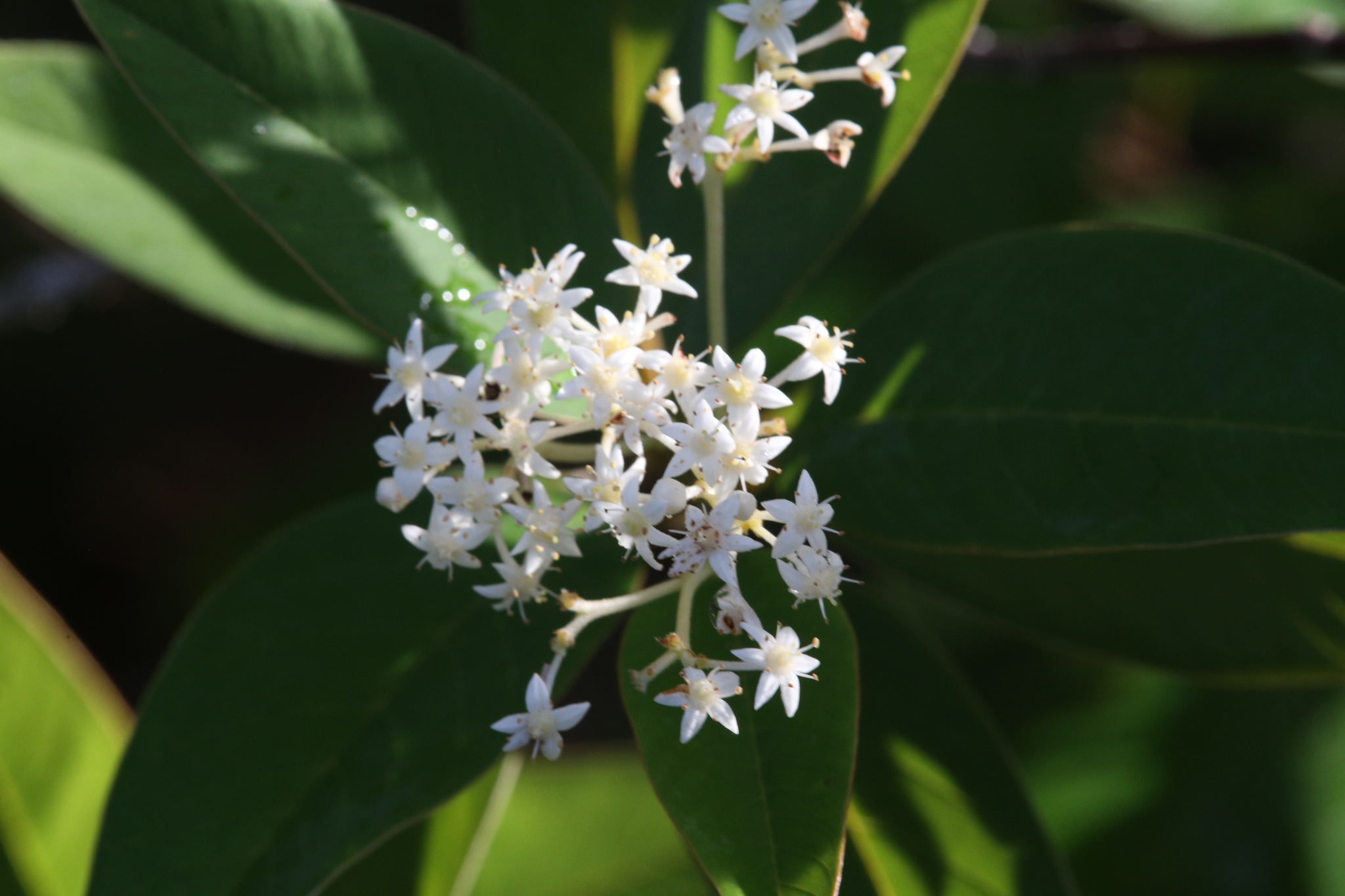

Scientific classification
- Kingdom: Plantae
- Clade: Tracheophytes
- Clade: Angiosperms
- Clade: Eudicots
- Clade: Rosids
- Order: Rosales
- Family: Rhamnaceae
- Genus: Pomaderris
- Species: P. tropica

Binomial name
- Pomaderris tropica N.G.Walsh

= Pomaderris tropica =

Species of plant

Pomaderris tropica is a species of flowering plant in the family Rhamnaceae and is endemic to Walshs Pyramid in north Queensland. It is a shrub with softly-hairy branchlets, egg-shaped to elliptic leaves and clusters of white to cream-coloured flowers.

== Description ==
Pomaderris tropica is a shrub that typically grows to a height of 2–3 m (6 ft 7 in – 9 ft 10 in), its branchlets covered with soft, star-shaped hairs. The leaves are egg-shaped to elliptic, 24–84 mm (0.94–3.31 in) long and 14–33 mm (0.55–1.30 in) wide on a petiole 6–13 mm (0.24–0.51 in) long with narrow triangular stipules 4.5–5.5 mm (0.18–0.22 in) long at the base. The upper surface of the leaves is covered with velvety hairs and the lower surface densely covered with soft, star-shaped hairs. The flowers are borne in clusters at the ends of branchlets, 25–40 mm (0.98–1.57 in) long and 40–70 mm (1.6–2.8 in) wide, each flower on a pedicel 2–4 mm (0.079–0.157 in) long. The sepals are oblong, about 2 mm (0.079 in) long but there are no petals. Flowering occurs from August to November.

== Taxonomy ==
Pomaderris tropica was first formally described in 1951 by Norman Arthur Wakefield in The Victorian Naturalist from specimens collected by Hugo Flecker on Walshs Pyramid in 1938. The specific epithet (tropica) means "tropical".

== Distribution and habitat ==
This pomaderris grows in narrow crevices between rocks on Walshs Pyramid in north Queensland.

== Conservation status ==
Pomaderris tropica is classified as of "least concern" under the Queensland Government Nature Conservation Act 1992.
