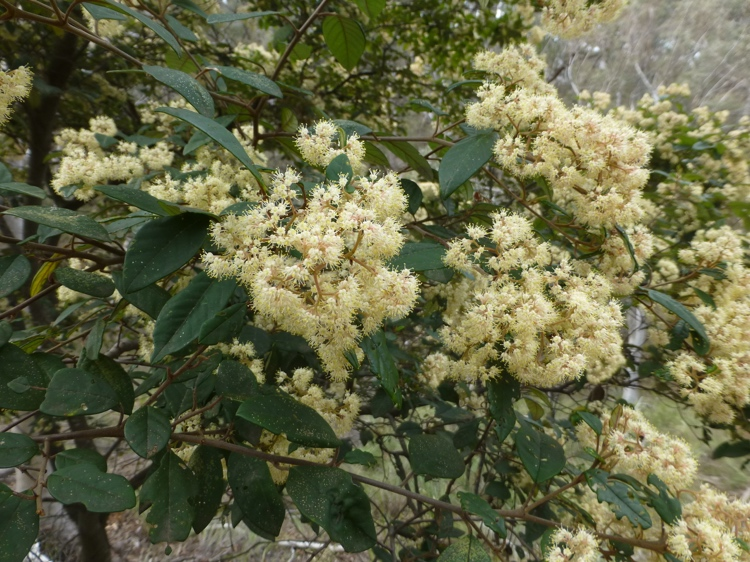
- At Black Mountain in the A.C.T.

Scientific classification
- Kingdom: Plantae
- Clade: Tracheophytes
- Clade: Angiosperms
- Clade: Eudicots
- Clade: Rosids
- Order: Rosales
- Family: Rhamnaceae
- Genus: Pomaderris
- Species: P. discolor

Binomial name
- Pomaderris discolor (Vent.) Poir.

Synonyms
- Ceanothus discolor Vent.

= Pomaderris discolor =

Species of shrub

Pomaderris discolor is a species of flowering plant in the family Rhamnaceae and is endemic to south-eastern continental Australia. It is a shrub with woolly-hairy stems, elliptic leaves, and clusters of pale yellowish flowers.

== Description ==
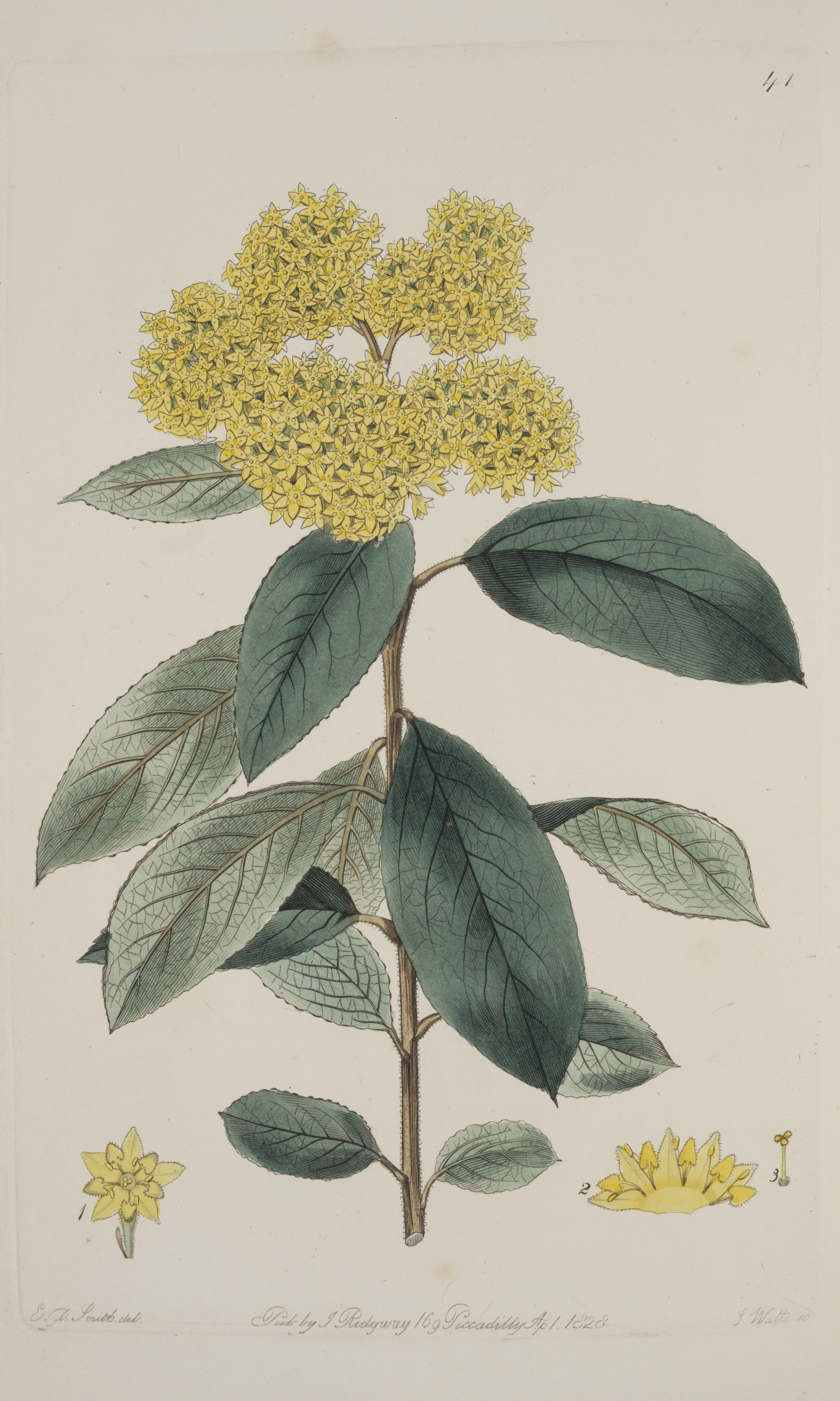
Pomaderris discolor illustration from Robert Sweet's Flora Australasica (1828)

Pomaderris discolor is a shrub that typically grows to a height of 1–3 m (3 ft 3 in – 9 ft 10 in), its stems covered with white, woolly, star-shaped hairs. The leaves are elliptic or egg-shaped, 30–95 mm (1.2–3.7 in) long and 10–40 mm (0.39–1.57 in) wide with stipules 4–6 mm (0.16–0.24 in) long at the base but that fall off as the leaf develops. The upper surface of the leaves is glabrous and the lower surface greyish and covered with star-shaped hairs. The flowers are pale yellowish and hairy, borne in pyramid-shaped panicles 30–60 mm (1.2–2.4 in) long on the ends of branchlets, each flower on a pedicel 1.2–2.5 mm (0.047–0.098 in) long. The floral cup is 0.5–11 mm (0.020–0.433 in) long, the sepals 1.2–1.7 mm (0.047–0.067 in) long and the petals 0.8–1.2 mm (0.031–0.047 in) long but fall off as the flower opens. Flowering occurs in September and October and the fruit is a hairy capsule.

== Taxonomy ==
This species was first formally described in 1804 by Étienne Pierre Ventenat who gave it the name Ceanothus discolor in his book Jardin de la Malmaison. In 1808, Jean Louis Marie Poiret changed the name to Pomaderris discolor.

== Distribution and habitat ==
Pomaderris discolor grows in open forest and rainforest margins between the Crawford River in New South Wales and Sale in eastern Victoria.
