= Pomaderris rotundifolia =

Scientific classification
- Kingdom: Plantae
- Clade: Tracheophytes
- Clade: Angiosperms
- Clade: Eudicots
- Clade: Rosids
- Order: Rosales
- Family: Rhamnaceae
- Genus: Pomaderris
- Species: P. rotundifolia

Binomial name
- Pomaderris rotundifolia (F.Muell.) ex Rye

Species of plant

Pomaderris rotundifolia is a species of flowering plant in the family Rhamnaceae and is endemic to Western Australia. It is an upright, spreading shrub that typically grows to a height of 0.1–1.5 m (3.9 in – 4 ft 11.1 in), its branchlets covered with star-shaped hairs. The leaves are more or less round leaves and the flowers are white to pink. In most respects it is similar to other species of Pomaderris occurring in Western Australia but has more prominent bracts, shorter pedicels and well-developed petals. Flowering occurs from June to October.

The species was first formally described in 1863 by Ferdinand von Mueller, who gave it the nme Spyridium rotundifolium in his Fragmenta Phytographiae Australiae, from specimens collected by George Maxwell near "Point Maxwell". In 1996, Barbara Lynette Rye changed the name to Pomaderris rotundifolia in the journal Nuytsia. The specific epithet (rotundifolia) means "round-leaved".

Pomaderris rotundifolia is found in the south of Western Australia in the Esperance Plains and Mallee biogeographic regions of the state. It is listed as "not threatened" by the Western Australian Government Department of Biodiversity, Conservation and Attractions.
