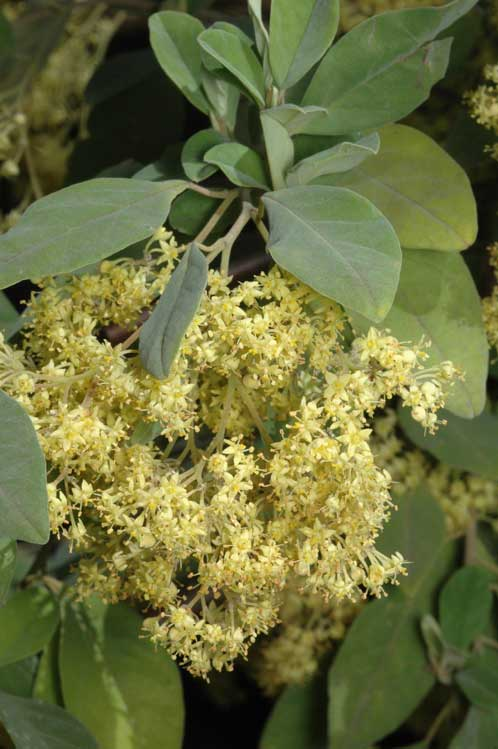
- In the Australian National Botanic Gardens

Scientific classification
- Kingdom: Plantae
- Clade: Tracheophytes
- Clade: Angiosperms
- Clade: Eudicots
- Clade: Rosids
- Order: Rosales
- Family: Rhamnaceae
- Genus: Pomaderris
- Species: P. cinerea

Binomial name
- Pomaderris cinerea Benth.

= Pomaderris cinerea =

Species of flowering plant

Pomaderris cinerea is a species of flowering plant in the family Rhamnaceae and is endemic to south-eastern New South Wales. It is a shrub or small tree with hairy branches, elliptic to egg-shaped with the narrower end towards the base, and panicles of pale yellow flowers.

== Description ==
Pomaderris cinerea is a shrub or tree that typically grows to a height of 5–10 m (16–33 ft), its branches ribbed and covered with woolly, star-shaped hairs. The leaves are more or less elliptic to egg-shaped with the narrower end towards the base, 20–50 mm (0.79–1.97 in) long and 10–20 mm (0.39–0.79 in) wide, the upper surface with velvety hairs and the lower surface densely covered with star-shaped hairs. The flowers are borne in narrow panicles and lack petals. Flowering occurs in summer and the fruit is a hairy capsule.

== Taxonomy ==
Pomaderris cinerea was first formally described in 1863 by George Bentham in Flora Australiensis from specimens collected by Ferdinand von Mueller on Mount Imlay and at Twofold Bay. The specific epithet (cinerea) means "ash-covered or grey".

== Distribution and habitat ==
This pomaderris grows in forest or near rainforest on near-coastal ranges from near Moruya to Bega in the far south-east of New South Wales.
