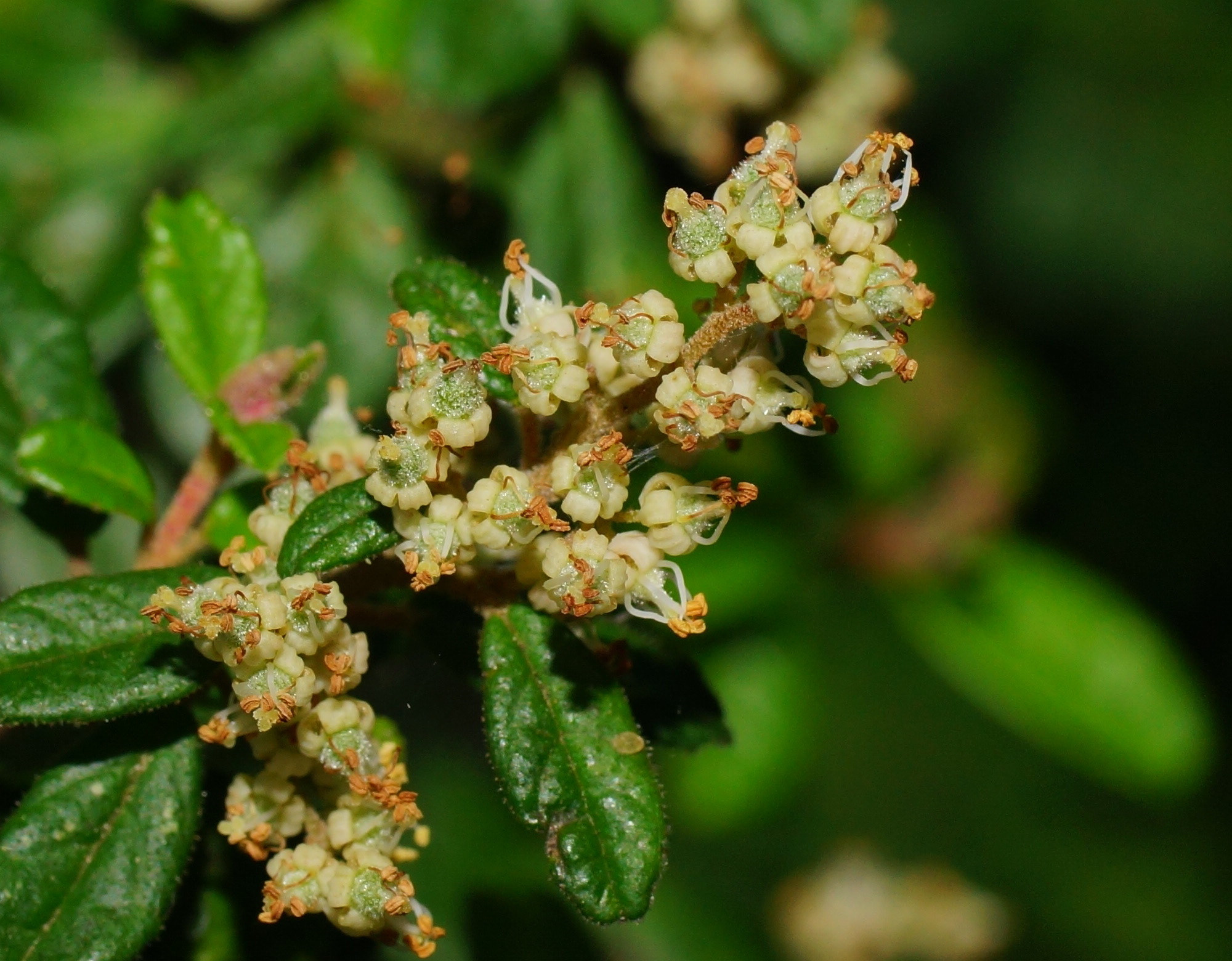
- Near Heywood, Victoria

Scientific classification
- Kingdom: Plantae
- Clade: Tracheophytes
- Clade: Angiosperms
- Clade: Eudicots
- Clade: Rosids
- Order: Rosales
- Family: Rhamnaceae
- Genus: Pomaderris
- Species: P. racemosa

Binomial name
- Pomaderris racemosa Hook.

= Pomaderris racemosa =

Species of flowering plant

Pomaderris racemosa is a species of flowering plant in the family Rhamnaceae and is endemic to south-eastern Australia. It is a shrub or small tree with densely hairy branchlets, egg-shaped to broadly elliptic leaves, and racemes or panicles of cream-coloured flowers.

== Description ==
Pomaderris racemosa is a shrub or tree that typically grows to a height of 2–8 m (6 ft 7 in – 26 ft 3 in) and has its branchlets densely covered with soft, star-shaped hairs. Its leaves are egg-shaped to broadly elliptic, mostly 15–20 mm (0.59–0.79 in) long and 8–12 mm (0.31–0.47 in) wide with stipules 2–4 mm (0.079–0.157 in) long at the base, but that fall off as the leaf develops. The upper surface of the leaves is more or less glabrous and the lower surface is covered with soft, star-shaped hairs. The flowers are cream-coloured and borne at the ends of branchlets or in leaf axils in racemes or panicles 20–40 mm (0.79–1.57 in) long. Each flower is on a pedicel 1–3.5 mm (0.039–0.138 in) long with egg-shaped bracts 5–6 mm (0.20–0.24 in) long at the base, but that fall off as the flowers open. The sepals are 1.5–1.8 mm (0.059–0.071 in) long but fall off as the flowers mature and there are no petals. Flowering occurs from October to December.

== Taxonomy ==
Pomaderris racemosa was first formally described in 1834 by William Jackson Hooker in The Journal of Botany from specimens collected by Robert William Lawrence in 1831.

== Distribution and habitat ==
This pomaderris grows in sheltered forest or in scrub from south-eastern South Australia to Rosedale in Victoria and in scattered locations along rivers and on the edges of lakes in Tasmania.
