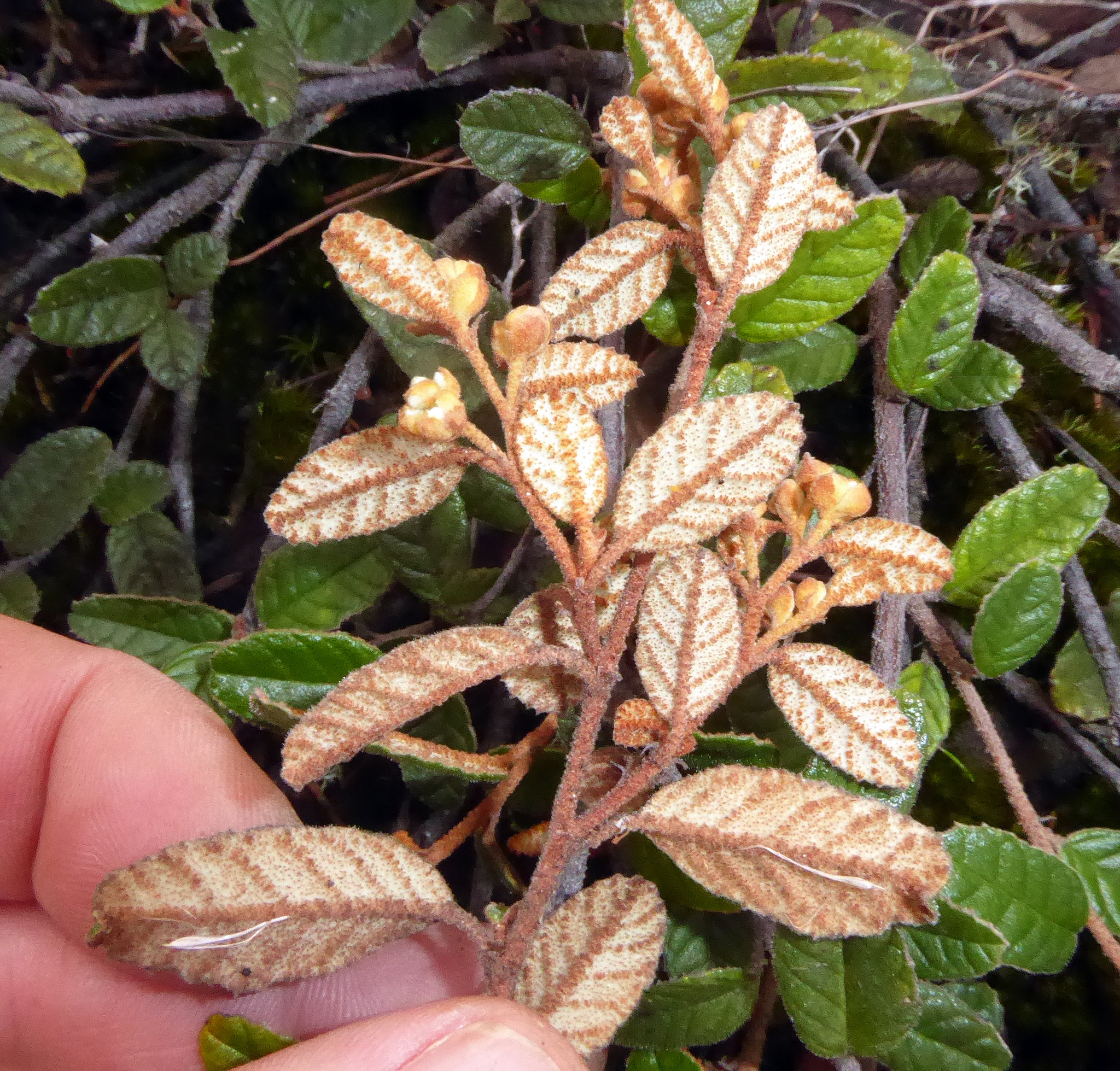

Scientific classification
- Kingdom: Plantae
- Clade: Tracheophytes
- Clade: Angiosperms
- Clade: Eudicots
- Clade: Rosids
- Order: Rosales
- Family: Rhamnaceae
- Genus: Pomaderris
- Species: P. edgerleyi

Binomial name
- Pomaderris edgerleyi Hook.f.

= Pomaderris edgerleyi =

Species of plant

Pomaderris edgerleyi is a species of plant endemic to North Island of New Zealand. The species was named after John Edgerley.
