= Pomaderris grandis =

Conservation status
- Priority Four — Rare Taxa (DEC)

Scientific classification
- Kingdom: Plantae
- Clade: Tracheophytes
- Clade: Angiosperms
- Clade: Eudicots
- Clade: Rosids
- Order: Rosales
- Family: Rhamnaceae
- Genus: Pomaderris
- Species: P. grandis

Binomial name
- Pomaderris grandis F.Muell.

Species of shrub

Pomaderris grandis, commonly known as large pomaderris, is a species of flowering plant in the family Rhamnaceae and is endemic to a restricted part of the south-west of Western Australia. It is an erect shrub that typically grows to a height of 30–75 cm (12–30 in) and produces white flowers from July to October. It grows in rocky gullies on the slopes of Mount Manypeaks in the Esperance Plains biogeographic region of south-western Western Australia. The species was first formally described in 1862 by Ferdinand von Mueller in his Fragmenta Phytographiae Australiae. It is listed as "Priority Four" by the Government of Western Australia Department of Biodiversity, Conservation and Attractions, meaning that it is rare or near threatened.
