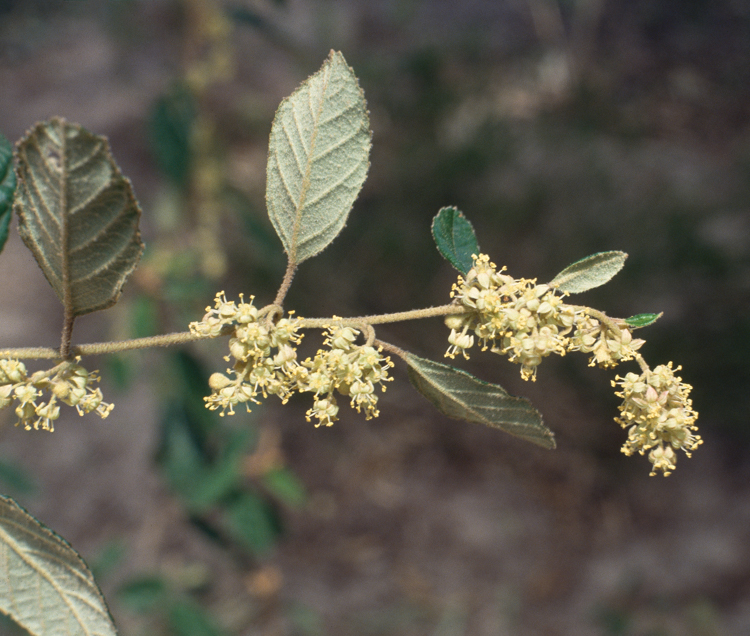

Scientific classification
- Kingdom: Plantae
- Clade: Embryophytes
- Clade: Tracheophytes
- Clade: Spermatophytes
- Clade: Angiosperms
- Clade: Eudicots
- Clade: Rosids
- Order: Rosales
- Family: Rhamnaceae
- Genus: Pomaderris
- Species: P. halmaturina

Binomial name
- Pomaderris halmaturina J.M.Black

= Pomaderris halmaturina =

Species of shrub

Pomaderris halmaturina, commonly known as Kangaroo Island pomaderris, is a species of flowering plant in the family Rhamnaceae and is endemic to southern continental Australia. It is a shrub with narrowly elliptic to egg-shaped leaves with toothed or wavy edges, and sparse panicles of hairy, yellowish-green flowers.

== Description ==
Pomaderris halmaturina is a shrub that typically grows to a height of 2–3 m (6 ft 7 in – 9 ft 10 in). The leaves are narrowly elliptic to egg-shaped, 25–55 mm (0.98–2.17 in) long and 12–25 mm (0.47–0.98 in) wide on a petiole 4–10 mm (0.16–0.39 in) long with egg-shaped stipules up to about 7 mm (0.28 in) long at the base, but that fall off as the leaf develops. The upper surface of the leaves is more or less glabrous and the lower surface is densely covered with woolly, star-shaped hairs. The flowers are borne in leaf axils or on the ends of branchlets in panicles or racemes about as long as the leaf at its base, each on a pedicel 1–4 mm (0.039–0.157 in) long. The sepals are 2.0–2.5 mm (0.079–0.098 in) long and yellowish-green with woolly, grey, star-shaped hairs on the back, and there are no petals. Flowering occurs in October and November.

== Taxonomy ==
Pomaderris halmaturina was first formally described in 1925 by John McConnell Black in Transactions and Proceedings of the Royal Society of South Australia from specimens collected on Kangaroo Island. Halmaturus is an old name for a genus of kangaroos.

In 1990, Neville Grant Walsh described two subspecies and the names are accepted by the Australian Plant Census:

- Pomaderris halmaturina subsp. continentis N.G.Walsh has leaves with wavy rather than toothed edges, and smaller flowers than the autonym;
- Pomaderris halmaturina J.M.Black subsp. halmaturina is listed as "vulnerable" under the Australian Government Environment Protection and Biodiversity Conservation Act 1999.

== Distribution and habitat ==
Subspecies continentis usually grows in forest or scrub on limestone soils and occurs along the coast of south-eastern South Australia, south-western Victoria and near Torquay and is listed as "rare". Subspecies halmaturina is restricted to Kangaroo Island.
