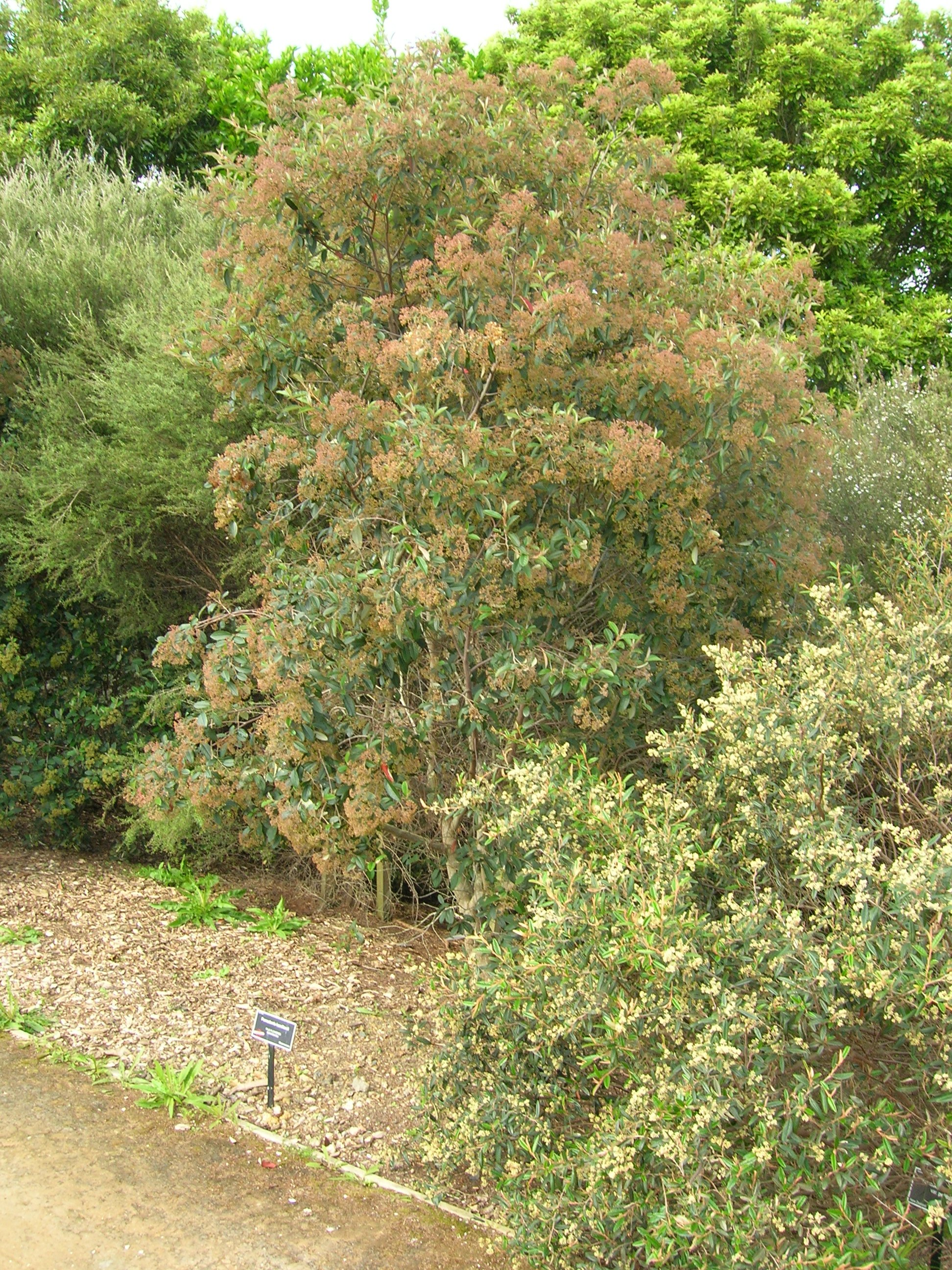

Conservation status
- Vulnerable (IUCN 3.1)

Scientific classification
- Kingdom: Plantae
- Clade: Tracheophytes
- Clade: Angiosperms
- Clade: Eudicots
- Clade: Rosids
- Order: Rosales
- Family: Rhamnaceae
- Genus: Pomaderris
- Species: P. hamiltonii

Binomial name
- Pomaderris hamiltonii L.B.Moore

= Pomaderris hamiltonii =

Species of flowering plant

Pomaderris hamiltonii is a species of plant in the family Rhamnaceae. It is a tree endemic to New Zealand. Commonly known as kūmarahou or pale flowered kūmarahou because of its pale brown flowers.
