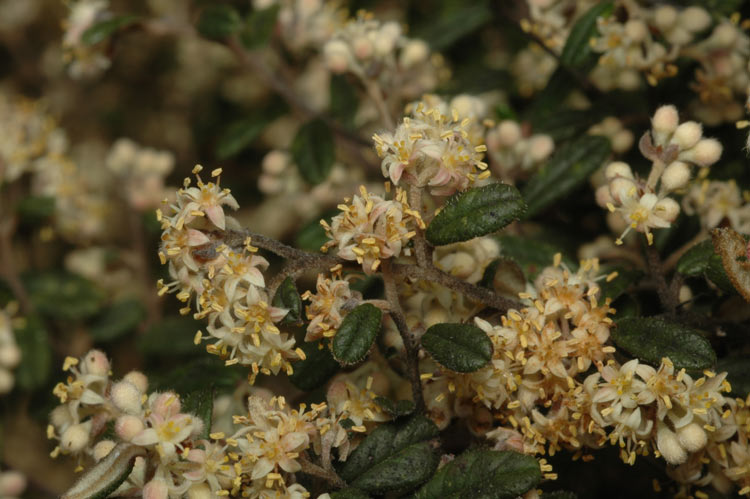

Scientific classification
- Kingdom: Plantae
- Clade: Tracheophytes
- Clade: Angiosperms
- Clade: Eudicots
- Clade: Rosids
- Order: Rosales
- Family: Rhamnaceae
- Genus: Pomaderris
- Species: P. pauciflora

Binomial name
- Pomaderris pauciflora N.A.Wakef.

= Pomaderris pauciflora =

Species of plant

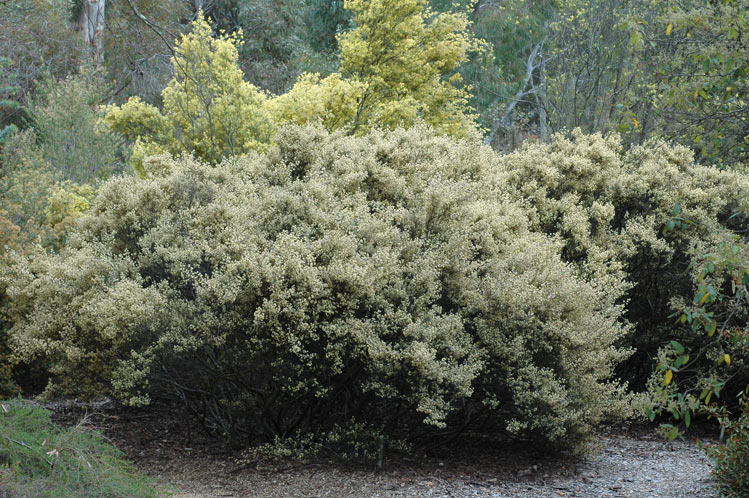
Habit in the ANBG

Pomaderris pauciflora is a species of flowering plant in the family Rhamnaceae and is endemic to the south-east of continental Australia. It is a shrub with hairy stems, mostly lance-shaped leaves with the narrower end towards the base, and panicles of cream-coloured flowers.

== Description ==
Pomaderris pauciflora is a shrub that typically grows to a height of 1–3 m (3 ft 3 in – 9 ft 10 in), its stems densely covered with woolly, star-shaped hairs. The leaves are lance-shaped with the narrower end towards the base, usually 15–20 mm (0.59–0.79 in) long and 4–5 mm (0.16–0.20 in) wide with more or less wavy edges. The upper surface of the leaves have a few bristly hairs, the lower surface densely covered with woolly, star-shaped hairs. The flowers are cream-coloured and borne in leafy panicles, each flower on a pedicel 0.5–2.5 mm (0.020–0.098 in) long. The petal-like sepals are 1.2–2.0 mm (0.047–0.079 in) long but soon fall off, and there are no petals. Flowering occurs in October and November and the fruit is a hairy capsule.

== Taxonomy ==
Pomaderris pauciflora was first formally described in 1951 by Norman Arthur Wakefield in The Victorian Naturalist from specimens collected near the Upper Genoa River in 1948. The specific epithet (pauciflora) means "few-flowered".

== Distribution and habitat ==
This pomaderris usually grows in rocky places along watercourses from south of Merriwa in New South Wales to the banks of the Genoa and Snowy Rivers in Victoria.
