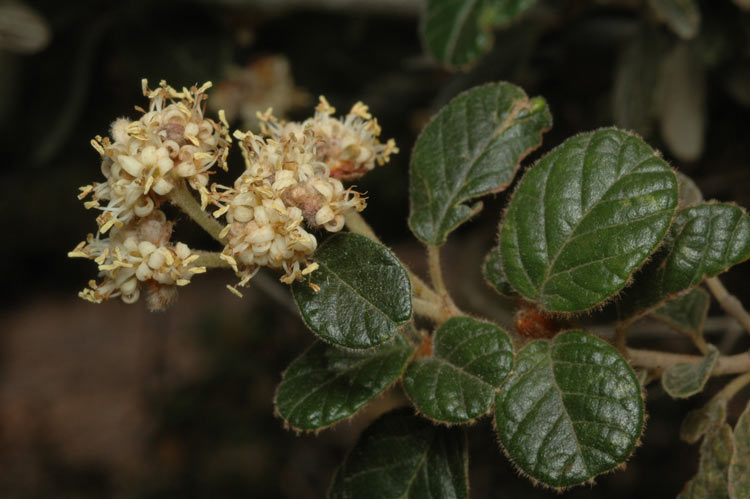
- In the Australian National Botanic Gardens

Scientific classification
- Kingdom: Plantae
- Clade: Tracheophytes
- Clade: Angiosperms
- Clade: Eudicots
- Clade: Rosids
- Order: Rosales
- Family: Rhamnaceae
- Genus: Pomaderris
- Species: P. eriocephala

Binomial name
- Pomaderris eriocephala N.A.Wakef.

= Pomaderris eriocephala =

Species of flowering plant

Pomaderris eriocephala is a species of flowering plant in the family Rhamnaceae and is endemic to south-eastern continental Australia. It is a spreading shrub with hairy stems, egg-shaped leaves, and clusters of cream-coloured flowers with white to rust-coloured hairs.

== Description ==
Pomaderris eriocephala is a spreading shrub that typically grows to a height of 1–3 m (3 ft 3 in – 9 ft 10 in), its branchlets densely covered with shaggy, rust-coloured hairs. The leaves are egg-shaped, sometimes with the narrower end towards the base, and sometimes with a notched tip, 8–45 mm (0.31–1.77 in) long and 7–30 mm (0.28–1.18 in) wide, the upper surface with bristly hairs and the lower surface covered with white and rust-coloured, star-shaped hairs. The flowers are cream-coloured and borne in clusters about 10 mm (0.39 in) wide, each flower on a pedicel up to 10 mm (0.39 in) long with bracts at the base and covered with white to rust-coloured hairs. The floral cup is 1.0–1.5 mm (0.039–0.059 in) long, the sepals 1.6–2.3 mm (0.063–0.091 in) long but fall off as the flowers open, and there are usually no petals. Flowering occurs in September and October.

== Taxonomy ==
Pomaderris eriocephala was first formally described in 1951 by Norman Arthur Wakefield in The Victorian Naturalist from specimens he collected near the Upper Genoa River in 1949. The specific epithet (eriocephala) means "wool-headed".

== Distribution and habitat ==
This pomaderris grows in forest and woodland, and is found from south of Barrington Tops along the coast, tablelands and western slopes of New South Wales, through the Australian Capital Territory to Bairnsdale in eastern Victoria.
