= Pomaderris virgata =

Scientific classification
- Kingdom: Plantae
- Clade: Tracheophytes
- Clade: Angiosperms
- Clade: Eudicots
- Clade: Rosids
- Order: Rosales
- Family: Rhamnaceae
- Genus: Pomaderris
- Species: P. virgata

Binomial name
- Pomaderris virgata N.G.Walsh

Species of plant

Pomaderris virgata, commonly known as upright pomaderris, is a species of flowering plant in the family Rhamnaceae and is endemic to south-eastern continental Australia. It is an erect, slender shrub with hairy branchlets, lance-shaped, narrowly elliptic or oblong leaves, and dense panicles of golden-yellow flowers.

== Description ==
Pomaderris virgata is an erect, slender shrub that typically grows to a height of 2–8 m (6 ft 7 in – 26 ft 3 in), its stems densely covered with soft, copper-coloured hairs. The leaves are lance-shaped, narrowly elliptic or oblong, 25–90 mm (0.98–3.54 in) long and 7–20 mm (0.28–0.79 in) wide on a petiole up to 12 mm (0.47 in) long. There are narrowly lance-shaped stipules 3–4 mm (0.12–0.16 in) long at the base of the petiole, but that fall off as the leaf matures. The upper surface of the leaves is glabrous but the lower surface is covered with silky, whitish to yellowish hairs. The flowers are borne in dense, pyramid-shaped panicles 20–70 mm (0.79–2.76 in) long at the ends of branchlets, each flower golden-yellow on a pedicel 1–2 mm (0.039–0.079 in). The sepals are 1.5–2.2 mm (0.059–0.087 in) long, and fall off as the flower matures and there are no petals. Flowering occurs in November and December.

== Taxonomy ==
Pomaderris virgata was first formally described in 1988 by Neville Grant Walsh in the journal Muelleria from specimens he collected in 1986 from Nalbaugh National Park (now part of the South East Forests National Park). The specific epithet (virgata) refers to the slender, upright habit of this species.

== Distribution and habitat ==
Upright pomaderris grows in rocky sites, often near watercourses in forest. It is found on the escarpment south from Tuross Falls in Wadbilliga National Park in New South Wales and from a single location near Orbost in north-eastern Victoria.
