= Pomaderris flabellaris =

Fan pomaderris

Scientific classification
- Kingdom: Plantae
- Clade: Tracheophytes
- Clade: Angiosperms
- Clade: Eudicots
- Clade: Rosids
- Order: Rosales
- Family: Rhamnaceae
- Genus: Pomaderris
- Species: P. flabellaris

Binomial name
- Pomaderris flabellaris (F.Muell. ex Reissek) J.M.Black

Synonyms
- Trymalium flabellare F.Muell. ex Reissek

Species of shrub

Pomaderris flabellaris, commonly known as fan pomaderris, is a species of flowering plant in the family Rhamnaceae and is endemic to South Australia. It is a low shrub with fan-shaped leaves, and small clusters of woolly-hairy flowers.

== Description ==
Pomaderris flabellaris is a shrub that typically grows to a height of about 1 m (3 ft 3 in). The leaves are fan-shaped, 4–8 mm (0.16–0.31 in) long and 5–13 mm (0.20–0.51 in) wide, usually with wavy or toothed edges, on a petiole 2–5 mm (0.079–0.197 in) long. Both surfaces are covered with star-shaped hairs, densely so on the lower surface. The flowers are arranged in small groups up to 20 mm (0.79 in) long in leaf axils and on the ends of branchlets, each flower on a hairy pedicel about 1 mm (0.039 in) long. The sepals are densely covered with rust-coloured, star-shaped hairs and are 2.0–2.5 mm (0.079–0.098 in) long but there are no petals. Flowering occurs from August to October.

== Taxonomy ==
Fan pomaderris was first formally described in 1858 by Siegfried Reissek who gave it the name Trymalium flabellare in the journal Linnaea: ein Journal für die Botanik in ihrem ganzen Umfange, oder Beiträge zur Pflanzenkundein from an unpublished description by Ferdinand von Mueller. In 1926, John McConnell Black changed the name to Pomaderris flabellaris.

== Distribution and habitat ==
Pomaderris flabellaris grows in shallow soil and sand dunes on the Eyre Peninsula in South Australia.
