= Pomaderris forrestiana =

Scientific classification
- Kingdom: Plantae
- Clade: Tracheophytes
- Clade: Angiosperms
- Clade: Eudicots
- Clade: Rosids
- Order: Rosales
- Family: Rhamnaceae
- Genus: Pomaderris
- Species: P. forrestiana

Binomial name
- Pomaderris forrestiana F.Muell.

Synonyms
- Pomaderris mayeri C.A.Gardner

Species of shrub

Pomaderris forrestiana is a species of flowering plant in the family Rhamnaceae and is endemic to south-western Australia. It is a low shrub with elliptic leaves, and small clusters of woolly-hairy flowers.

== Description ==
Pomaderris forrestiana is a shrub that typically grows to a height of about 30–75 cm (12–30 in). The leaves are elliptic, 4–8 mm (0.16–0.31 in) long and 4–7 mm (0.16–0.28 in) wide, on a petiole 1–2 mm (0.039–0.079 in) long. The upper surface is velvety-hairy and the lower surface is covered with grey, woolly, star-shaped hairs. The flowers are arranged in small groups in leaf axils and on the ends of branchlets, each flower on a hairy pedicel about 1 mm (0.039 in) long. The sepals are about 2 mm (0.079 in) long with grey, woolly, star-shaped hairs on the back and the petals are spatula-shaped and slightly shorter than the sepals. Flowering has been observed in July and September.

== Taxonomy ==
Pomaderris forrestiana was first formally described in 1875 by Ferdinand von Mueller in his Fragmenta Phytographiae Australiae from specimens collected by John Forrest. The specific epithet (forrestiana) honours the collector of the type specimens.

== Distribution and habitat ==
Pomaderris forrestiana grows in rocky and sandy soils on stony hills and coastal limestone south from Kalgoorlie in Western Australia and along the coast of south-western Australia to as far east as near the border between Western Australia and South Australia.

== Conservation status ==
This pomaderris is listed as "not threatened" by the Government of Western Australia Department of Biodiversity, Conservation and Attractions.
