= Pomaderris coomingalensis =

Scientific classification
- Kingdom: Plantae
- Clade: Tracheophytes
- Clade: Angiosperms
- Clade: Eudicots
- Clade: Rosids
- Order: Rosales
- Family: Rhamnaceae
- Genus: Pomaderris
- Species: P. coomingalensis

Binomial name
- Pomaderris coomingalensis N.G.Walsh & Coates

Species of shrub

Pomaderris coomingalensis is a species of flowering plant in the family Rhamnaceae and is endemic to Queensland. It is a shrub with hairy young stems, egg-shaped or elliptic leaves, and clusters of cream-coloured or yellow flowers.

== Description ==
Pomaderris coomingalensis is a shrub that typically grows to a height of 3–5 m (9.8–16.4 ft), its young stems densely covered with greyish, star-shaped hairs. The leaves are egg-shaped to elliptic, mostly 20–60 mm (0.79–2.36 in) long and 7–18 mm (0.28–0.71 in) wide on a petiole 2–5 mm (0.079–0.197 in) long, the upper surface glabrous and the lower surface with greyish, star-shaped hairs. The flowers are borne in clusters or twenty to fifty 10–15 mm (0.39–0.59 in) long on the ends of branchlets and are cream-coloured or yellow, each flower on a pedicel 1–2 mm (0.039–0.079 in) long. The floral cup is about 1 mm (0.039 in) in diameter and the sepals are 1.2–1.5 mm (0.047–0.059 in) long but there are no petals. Flowering occurs in November and December.

== Taxonomy ==
Pomaderris coomingalensis was first formally described in 1997 by Neville Grant Walsh and Fiona Coates and the description was published in the journal Muelleria from specimens collected by Paul Irwin Forster in the Coominglah Range in 1994.

== Distribution and habitat ==
This pomaderris grows in open forest and is only known from the type location.

== Conservation status ==
This pomaderris is listed as "endangered" under the Queensland Government Nature Conservation Act 1992.
