= Pomaderris briagolensis =

Scientific classification
- Kingdom: Plantae
- Clade: Tracheophytes
- Clade: Angiosperms
- Clade: Eudicots
- Clade: Rosids
- Order: Rosales
- Family: Rhamnaceae
- Genus: Pomaderris
- Species: P. briagolensis

Binomial name
- Pomaderris briagolensis Messina

Species of shrub

Pomaderris briagolensis is a species of flowering plant in the family Rhamnaceae and is endemic to Victoria, Australia. It is a shrub with hairy branchlets, egg-shaped or oblong leaves and panicles of white to rust-coloured flowers.

== Description ==
Pomaderris briagolensis is a shrub that typically grows to a height of up to 2 m (6 ft 7 in), its branchlets covered with soft, rust-coloured hairs. The leaves are egg-shaped with the narrower end towards the base, to oblong, 12–24 mm (0.47–0.94 in) long and 6–10 mm (0.24–0.39 in) wide on a petiole 4–9 mm (0.16–0.35 in) long with stipules 1–5 mm (0.039–0.197 in) long at the base. The upper surface of the leaves is glossy and the lower surface is densely covered with white, star-shaped hairs. The flowers are borne in pyramid-shaped panicles up to 40 mm (1.6 in) wide containing about twenty to forty individual flowers, each flower on a pedicel 1–2 mm (0.039–0.079 in) long. The floral cup is 1.0–1.5 mm (0.039–0.059 in) long and densely hairy, the sepals are 1.5–2.0 mm (0.059–0.079 in) long with white, star-shaped and rust-coloured hairs and there are no petals. Flowering occurs from September to October.

== Taxonomy ==
Pomaderris briagolensis was first formally described in 2010 by Andre Messina in the journal Muelleria from specimens collected he collected near Briagolong in 2006. The specific epithet (briagolensis) refers to the type location.

== Distribution and habitat ==
This pomaderris grows in rocky places in the catchment of Freestone Creek near Briagolong in eastern Victoria.

== Conservation status ==
This pomaderris is listed as "endangered" under the Victorian Government Flora and Fauna Guarantee Act 1988 and the Department of Environment and Primary Industries's Advisory List of Rare Or Threatened Plants In Victoria.
