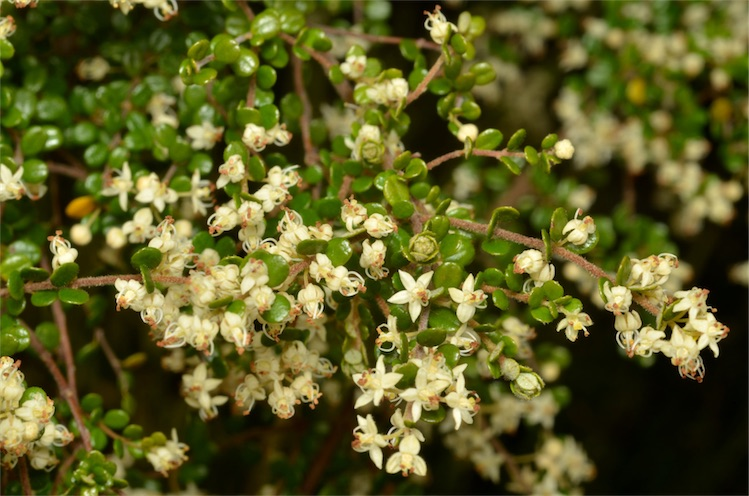
- Pomaderris elachophylla

Scientific classification
- Kingdom: Plantae
- Clade: Tracheophytes
- Clade: Angiosperms
- Clade: Eudicots
- Clade: Rosids
- Order: Rosales
- Family: Rhamnaceae
- Genus: Pomaderris
- Species: P. elachophylla

Binomial name
- Pomaderris elachophylla F.Muell.

= Pomaderris elachophylla =

Lacy pomaderris

Species of shrub

Pomaderris elachophylla, commonly known as lacy pomaderris, small leaf pomaderris or small-leaf dogwood, is a species of flowering plant in the family Rhamnaceae and is endemic to south-eastern Australia. It is a slender shrub with densely hairy branchlets, egg-shaped leaves, and cream-coloured flowers arranged singly or in clusters in leaf axils.

== Description ==
Pomaderris elachophylla is a shrub that typically grows to a height of 1–3.5 m (3 ft 3 in – 11 ft 6 in), its branchlets densely covered with fine, rust-coloured, star-shaped hairs. The leaves are egg-shaped, sometimes with the narrower end towards the base, mostly 2–10 mm (0.079–0.394 in) long and 1.5–5 mm (0.059–0.197 in) wide with stipules about 0.5 mm (0.020 in) long at the base but that fall off as the leaf develops. The upper surface of the leaves is glabrous and the lower surface densely covered with whitish and sometimes rust-coloured, star-shaped hairs. The flowers are cream-coloured and hairy, borne singly or in small cluster in leaf axils, each flower on a pedicel 1–3 mm (0.039–0.118 in) long. The floral cup is 0.1–0.2 mm (0.0039–0.0079 in) long, the sepals 1.4–1.6 mm (0.055–0.063 in) long and there are no petals. Flowering occurs from November to December and the fruit is a hairy capsule.

== Taxonomy ==
Pomaderris elachophylla was first formally described in 1861 by Ferdinand von Mueller in Fragmenta Phytographiae Australiae. The specific epithet (elachophylla) means "small, short-leaved".

== Distribution and habitat ==
Lacy pomaderris grows in tall, damp forest in gullies and near creeks from south-east of Bombala in New South Wales, from near Portland to the Cobberas Range in Victoria and in scattered places in Tasmania.

== Conservation status ==
This pomaderris is listed as "endangered" in New South Wales, under the Biodiversity Conservation Act 2016 (NSW). The main threats to the species include forestry operations, inappropriate fire regimes, grazing by domestic stock and maintenance of roadside reserves.
