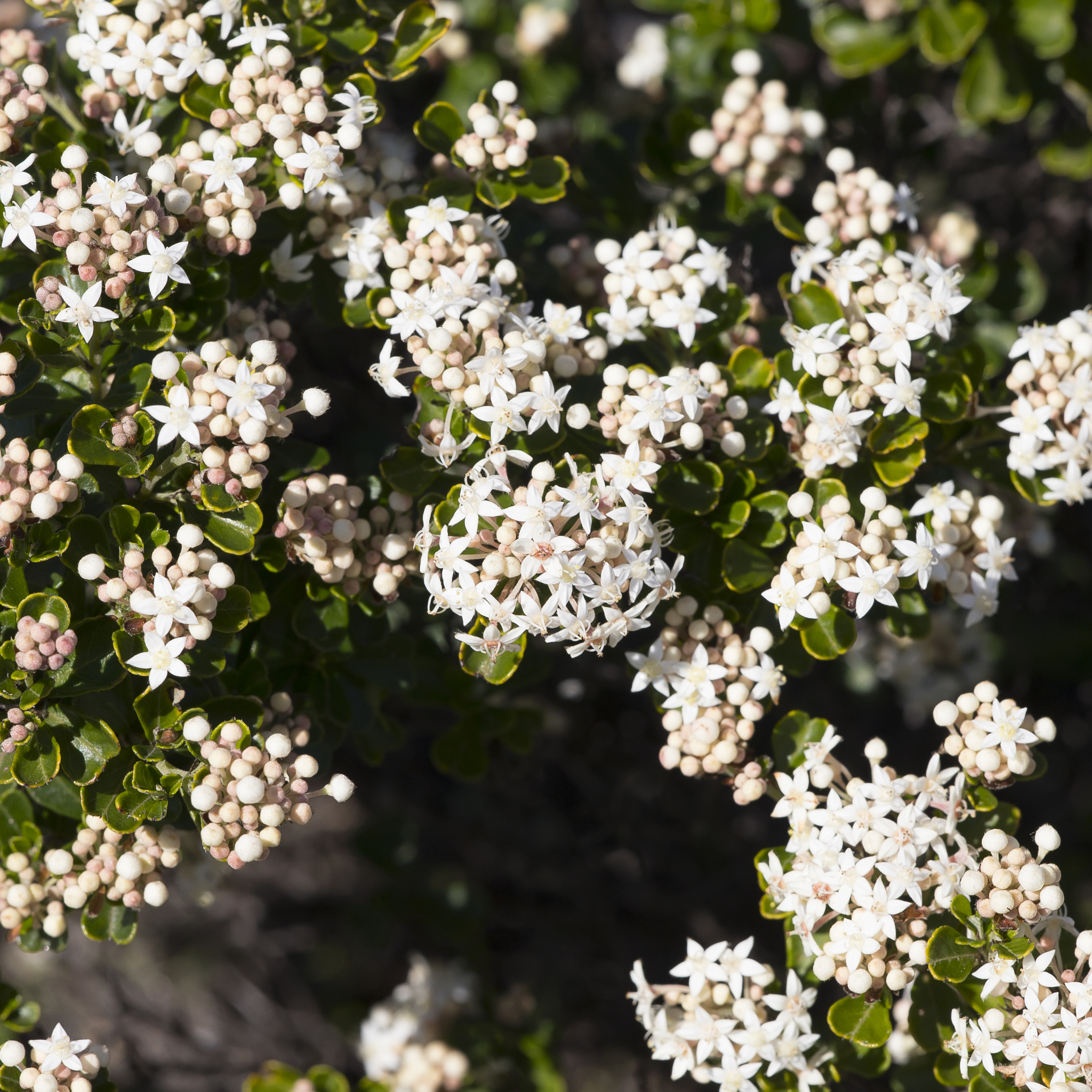
- In Coffin Bay National Park

Scientific classification
- Kingdom: Plantae
- Clade: Tracheophytes
- Clade: Angiosperms
- Clade: Eudicots
- Clade: Rosids
- Order: Rosales
- Family: Rhamnaceae
- Genus: Pomaderris
- Species: P. obcordata

Binomial name
- Pomaderris obcordata Fenzl

Synonyms
- Pomaderris biaurita (Reissek & F.Muell.) F.Muell.; Pomaderris biauritum F.Muell. orth. var.; Trymalium biauritum Reissek & F.Muell.; Trymalium bilobatum F.Muell.; Trymalium bilobatum F.Muell.

= Pomaderris obcordata =

Species of plant

Pomaderris obcordata, commonly known as wedge-leaved pomaderris, is a species of flowering plant in the family Rhamnaceae and is endemic to South Australia. It is a shrub with densely hairy branchlets, wedge-shaped, narrowly egg-shaped or heart-shaped leaves with the narrower end towards the base, and white to pink flowers.

== Description ==
Pomaderris obcordata is a shrub that typically grows to a height of 0.3–1 m (1 ft 0 in – 3 ft 3 in) and has its branchlets densely covered with simple and star-shaped hairs. The leaves are wedge-shaped, narrowly egg-shaped or heart-shaped with the narrower end towards the base, 6–18 mm (0.24–0.71 in) long and 2–12 mm (0.079–0.472 in) wide with stipules 2–3 mm (0.079–0.118 in) long at the base. The upper surface of the leaves is glabrous and the lower surface is covered with woolly, star-shaped hairs. The flowers are white to pink and are borne in groups on the ends of branches, each flower on a hairy pedicel 2–3 mm (0.079–0.118 in) long. The sepals are 1.8–2.5 mm (0.071–0.098 in) long, there are no petals and the style is branched at the tip. Flowering mainly occurs from July to September.

== Taxonomy ==
Pomaderris obcordata was first formally described in 1837 by Eduard Fenzl in Enumeratio plantarum quas in Novae Hollandiae ora austro-occidentali ad fluvium Cygnorum et in sinu Regis Georgii collegit Carolus Liber Baro de Hügel from specimens collected by Ferdinand Bauer. The specific epithet (obcordata) means "inverted heart-shaped".

== Distribution and habitat ==
Wedge-leaved pomaderris grows in mallee scrub, or heath and occurs in south-eastern South Australia, including on the Eyre and Yorke Peninsulas and Kangaroo Island. There are two records from far western Victoria, the most recent from 1969, but may be examples of inaccurate locality recording.
