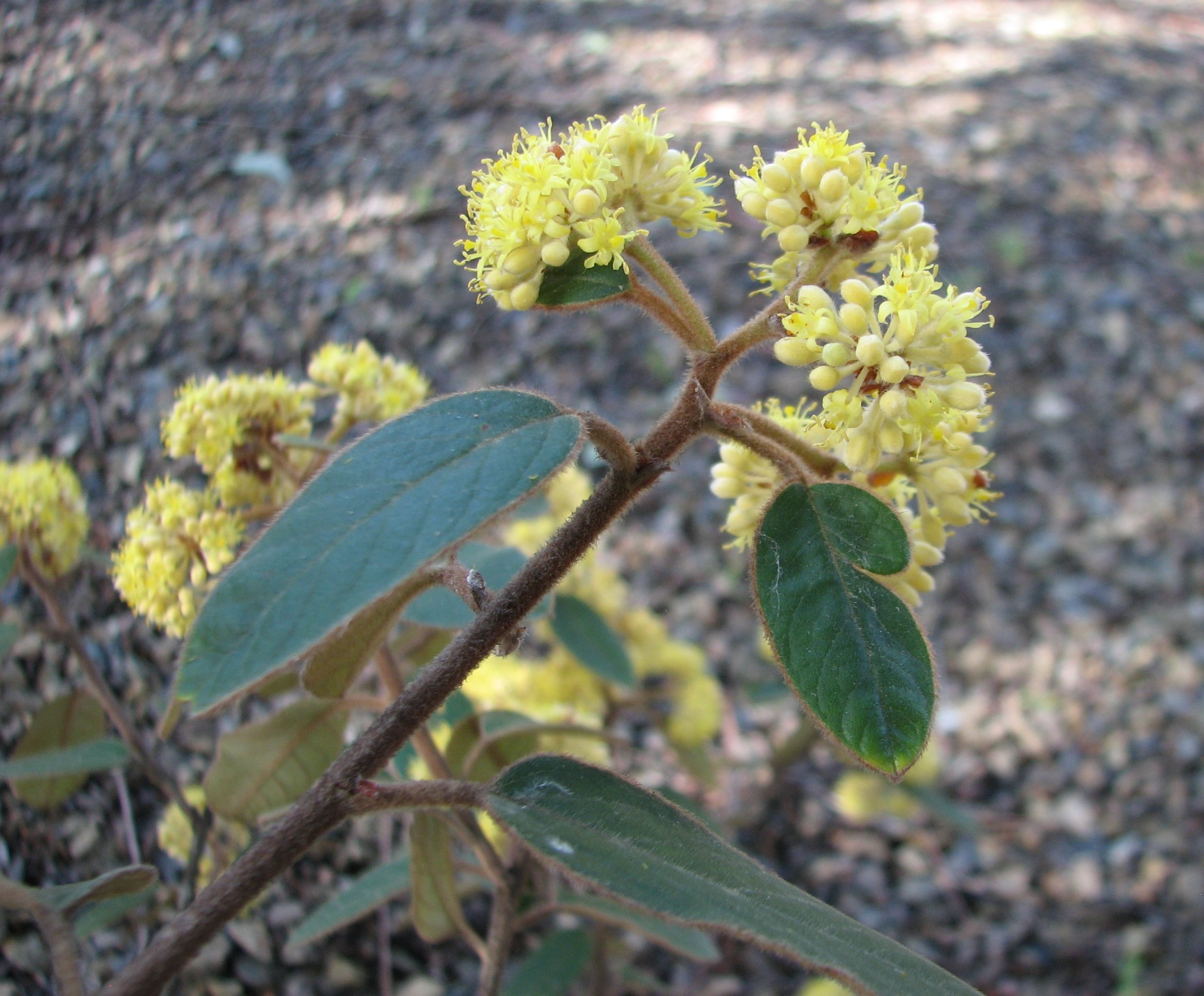
- In Maranoa Gardens

Scientific classification
- Kingdom: Plantae
- Clade: Tracheophytes
- Clade: Angiosperms
- Clade: Eudicots
- Clade: Rosids
- Order: Rosales
- Family: Rhamnaceae
- Genus: Pomaderris
- Species: P. vellea

Binomial name
- Pomaderris vellea N.A.Wakef.

= Pomaderris vellea =

Species of shrub

Pomaderris vellea, commonly known as woolly pomaderris, is a species of flowering plant in the family Rhamnaceae and is endemic to eastern Australia. It is an erect shrub with curly-hairy stems, oblong to circular leaves, and dense panicles of yellow flowers.

== Description ==
Pomaderris vellea is an erect shrub that typically grows to a height of up to 2 m (6 ft 7 in), its stems covered with curly hairs. The leaves are oblong to circular, mostly 30–40 mm (1.2–1.6 in) long and about 20 mm (0.79 in) wide, sometimes with a notched tip. The upper surface of the leaves is densely hairy and velvety, the lower surface covered with woolly, rust-coloured hairs. The flowers are borne in dense panicles at the ends of branches, each flower yellow, the sepals and petals together 3–5 mm (0.12–0.20 in).

== Taxonomy ==
Pomaderris vellea was first formally described in 1951 by Norman Wakefield in The Victorian Naturalist based on plant material collected from Torrington in New South Wales by J.L. Boorman in 1911. The specific epithet (vellea) means "fleece" or "wool", referring to the fine, soft texture of the leaves.

== Distribution and habitat ==
Woolly pomaderris grows in open forest on the coast and escarpments from far south-eastern Queensland to the Sydney region and inland as far as Denman in New South Wales.
