= Brogo Dam =

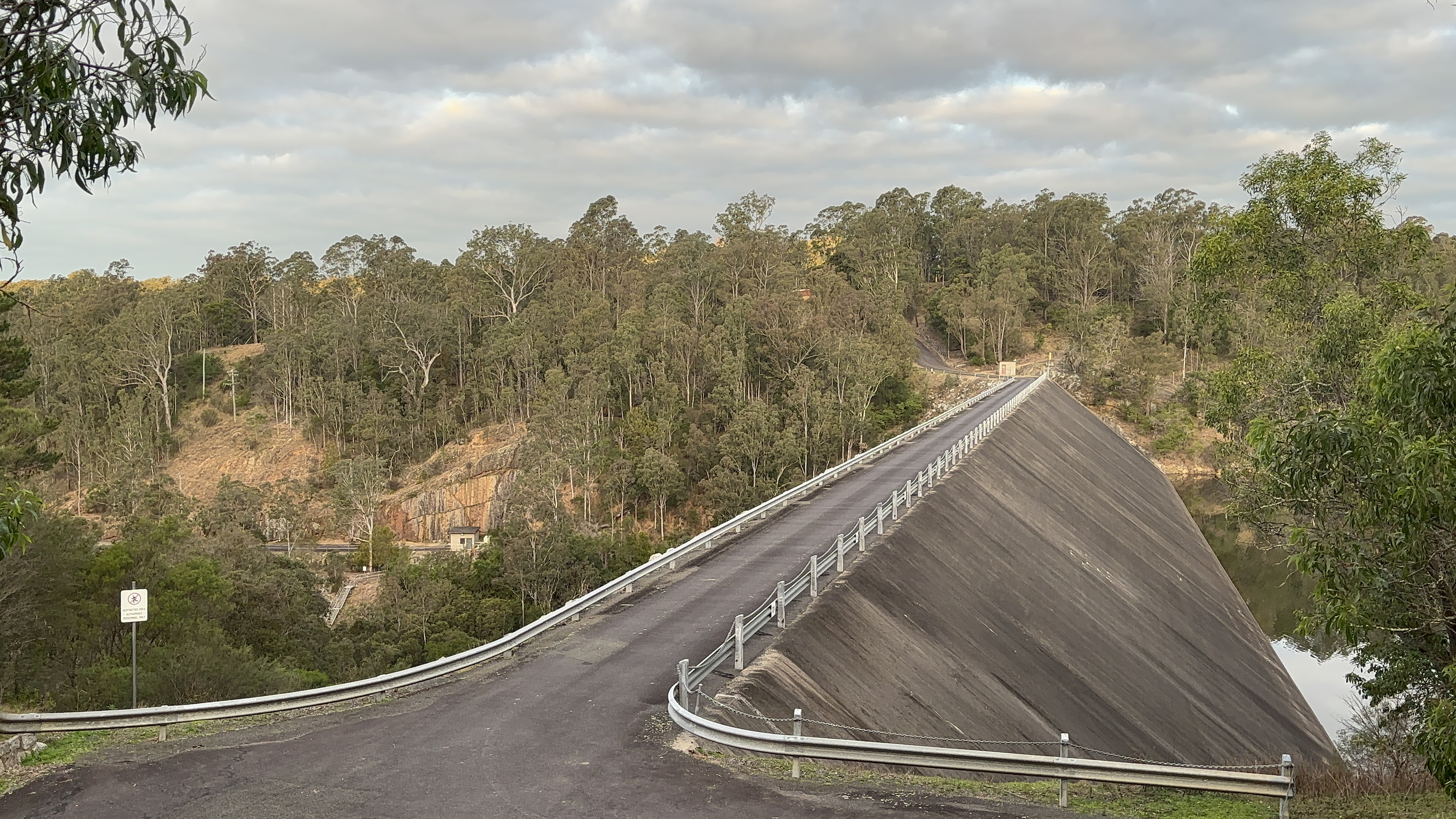
- Brogo Dam

- Location of the Brogo Dam in New South Wales
- Country: Australia
- Location: South Coast, New South Wales
- Coordinates: 36°28′58.5″S 149°44′2.85″E
- Purpose: Environmental flows, hydro-electric power generation, irrigation, and water supply
- Status: Operational
- Construction began: 1964
- Opening date: 1976
- Owner: State Water Corporation

Dam and spillways
- Type of dam: Embankment dam
- Impounds: Brogo River
- Height: 43 metres (141 ft)
- Length: 265 metres (869 ft)
- Width (crest): 6 metres (20 ft)
- Dam volume: 309 cubic metres (10,900 cu ft)
- Spillway type: Uncontrolled unlined rock cut
- Spillway capacity: 3,700 cubic metres per second (130,000 cu ft/s)

Reservoir
- Total capacity: 8,980 megalitres (317×10^{6} cu ft)
- Catchment area: 400 square kilometres (150 sq mi)
- Surface area: 100 hectares (250 acres)
- Maximum water depth: 25 metres (82 ft)
- Normal elevation: 102 metres (335 ft) AHD

Power Station
- Operator: Delta Electricity
- Type: Mini hydro
- Turbines: 1
- Installed capacity: 2 megawatts (2,700 hp)
- Website; Brogo Dam

Brogo Dam is a minor ungated rockfill embankment dam with an uncontrolled unlined rock cut spillway across the Brogo River upstream of Brogo in the South Coast region of New South Wales, Australia. The dam's purpose includes environmental flows, hydro-electric power generation, irrigation, and water supply. The impounded reservoir is also called Brogo Dam.

== Location and features ==
Commenced in 1964 and completed in 1976, the Brogo Dam is a major dam on the Brogo River, a tributary of the Bega River, and is located approximately 30 kilometres (19 mi) northwest of Bega. The dam was built by Citra Constructions Pty Limited on behalf of the New South Wales Department of Land and Water Conservation to supply water for irrigation and potable water for the towns of Quaama, Cobargo, and Bermagui. The dam supplies water to farmers along the Brogo and Bega rivers for stock and domestic use and irrigation on improved pastures for stock feed. Dairy farming is the main industry in the Bega Valley and the dam ensures a continuous and reliable supply for this activity.

The dam wall comprises 8,547 cubic metres (301,800 cu ft) of concrete-faced rock fill and is 43 metres (141 ft) high and is 260 metres (850 ft) long. The maximum water depth is 25 metres (82 ft) and at 100% capacity the dam wall holds back 8,980 megalitres (317×10^{6} cu ft) of water at 102 metres (335 ft) AHD. The surface area of Brogo Dam is 100 hectares (250 acres) and the catchment area is 400 square kilometres (150 sq mi). The uncontrolled unlined rock cut spillway is capable of discharging 3,700 cubic metres per second (130,000 cu ft/s).

=== Power generation ===
In 2002, Delta Electricity won the right to construct a mini hydro power station and generate up to 2 megawatts (2,700 hp) of electricity from the flow of the water leaving Brogo Dam.

== Recreation ==
Brogo Dam is stocked with Australian Bass and eels can also be found in the dam's waters. Boating and canoeing on the dam's surface are permitted. The area surrounding the dam has abundant ferns and rock orchids that provide a photographer's paradise.

== See also ==
- Delta Electricity
- Irrigation in Australia
- List of dams and reservoirs in Australia
