= Bemboka River =

Location
- Country: Australia
- State: New South Wales
- Region: South East Corner (IBRA), South Eastern Highlands (IBRA), Monaro, South Coast
- District: Bega Valley
- City: Bemboka

Physical characteristics
- Source: Kybeyan Range, Great Dividing Range
  - location: near Nimmitabel
  - coordinates: 36°31′16″S 149°28′18″E
  - elevation: 897 m (2,943 ft)
- Mouth: confluence with Tantawangalo Creek
  - location: Morans Crossing, Snowy Mountains Highway
  - coordinates: 36°40′S 149°39′E
  - elevation: 93 m (305 ft)
- Length: 27.9 km (17.3 mi)

Basin features
- River system: Bega River
- Tributaries
  - left: Brown Mountain Creek, Polacks Flat Creek
  - right: Nunnock River
- National park: Wadbilliga

The Bemboka River, a perennial stream of the Bega River catchment, is located in the Monaro and South Coast regions of New South Wales, Australia.

== Course and features ==
The Bemboka River rises in the Kybeyan Range, that is part of the Great Dividing Range, about 18 kilometres (11 mi) east of the village of Nimmitabel; and flows generally south southwest, south southeast, and east southeast, joined by three tributaries including the Nunnock River, before reaching its confluence with the Tantawangalo Creek to form the Bega River at Morans Crossing, adjacent to the Snowy Mountains Highway. The river descends 804 metres (2,638 ft) over its 27.9 kilometres (17.3 mi) course.

In its upper reaches, the Bemboka River is impounded by the Cochrane Dam to form the Cochrane Lake. The main purpose of the dam is to supply water for a run-of-the-river hydroelectric power station at the downstream Brown Mountain Power Station, and for irrigation purposes.

The Bemboka River was previously the name given to the Bega River. The name Bemboka River now only applies down to its confluence with Tantawangalo Creek, from where the water course is then known as the Bega River.

== See also ==
- List of rivers of Australia
- List of rivers of New South Wales (A–K)
- Rivers of New South Wales
