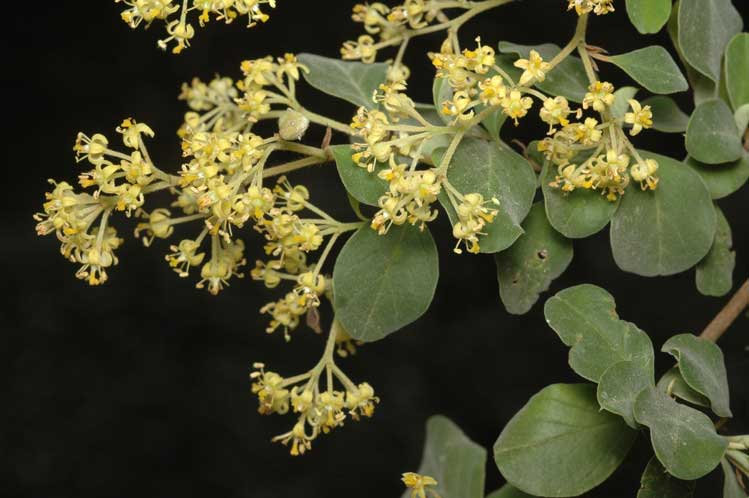
- In the Australian National Botanic Gardens

Scientific classification
- Kingdom: Plantae
- Clade: Tracheophytes
- Clade: Angiosperms
- Clade: Eudicots
- Clade: Rosids
- Order: Rosales
- Family: Rhamnaceae
- Genus: Pomaderris
- Species: P. brogoensis

Binomial name
- Pomaderris brogoensis N.G.Walsh

= Pomaderris brogoensis =

Species of shrub

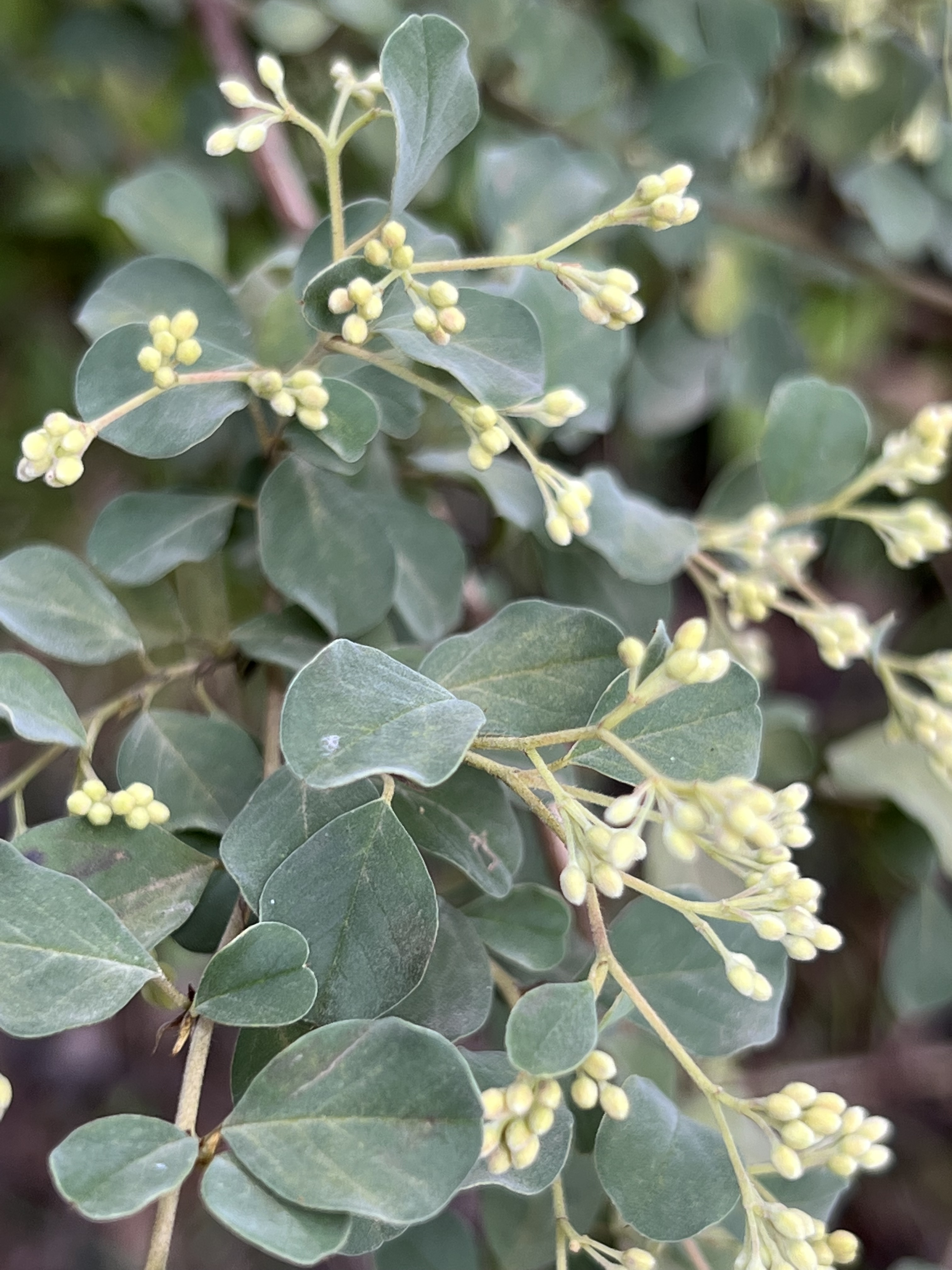
Foliage and buds

Pomaderris brogoensis is a species of flowering plant in the family Rhamnaceae and is endemic to south-eastern New South Wales. It is a slender shrub or spreading tree with hairy branchlets, egg-shaped to more or less round leaves, and clusters of yellowish flowers.

== Description ==
Pomaderris brogoensis is a slender shrub or spreading tree that typically grows to a height of up to 9 m (30 ft), its stems covered with white and rust-coloured hairs. The leaves are egg-shaped with the narrower end towards the base to more or less round, 6–20 mm (0.24–0.79 in) long, 5–14 mm (0.20–0.55 in) wide with lance-shaped stipules mostly 3–5 mm (0.12–0.20 in) long at the base, and covered with star-shaped hairs. The flowers are borne in pyramid-shaped panicles, each flower on a densely hairy pedicel about 2 mm (0.079 in) long. The sepals are golden yellow, oblong and 1.6–2.0 mm (0.063–0.079 in) long but there are no petals. The stamens alternate with the sepals and are 1.0–1.3 mm (0.039–0.051 in) long.

== Taxonomy ==
Pomaderris brogoensis was first formally described in 1988 by Neville Grant Walsh in the journal Muelleria from specimens collected by David Albrecht in the Bemboka State Forest in 1986. The specific epithet (brogoensis) refers to the type location.

== Distribution and habitat ==
This pomaderris usually grows on steep, north-facing slopes and occurs in scattered locations, mostly in the upper catchments of the Brogo River on the South Coast and Southern Tablelands of New South Wales.
