= Murrah River =

River in New South Wales, Australia

Coordinates: 36°32′S 150°01′E

Murrah River Dry River

Location
- Country: Australia
- State: New South Wales
- Region: South East Corner (IBRA), South Coast
- Local government area: Bega Valley

Physical characteristics
- Source: Mumbulla Creek and Dry River
  - location: near Quaama
  - elevation: 272 m (892 ft)
- Mouth: Tasman Sea, South Pacific Ocean
  - location: Murrah Lagoon
  - elevation: 5 m (16 ft)
- Basin size: 196 km^{2} (76 sq mi)
- Depth
  - average: 0.7 m (2 ft 4 in)

Murrah River is an open mature wave dominated barrier estuary or perennial river located in the South Coast region of New South Wales, Australia.

== Course and features ==
Formed by the confluence of the Mumbulla Creek and Dry River, approximately 10 kilometres (6.2 mi) southeast by south of Quaama, the Murrah River flows generally east, before flowing into Murrah Lagoon and reaching its mouth into the Tasman Sea of the South Pacific Ocean north of Murrah Beach. The length of the course of the river varies between 15 kilometres (9.3 mi) and 44 kilometres (27 mi).

The catchment area of the river is 196 square kilometres (76 sq mi) with a volume of 500 megalitres (18×10^{6} cu ft) over a surface area of 0.8 square kilometres (0.31 sq mi), at an average depth of 0.7 metres (2 ft 4 in).

The Princes Highway crosses Murrah River at Quaama, south of Cobargo.

== See also ==
- Rivers of New South Wales
- List of rivers of New South Wales (L–Z)
- List of rivers of Australia
