= Pomaderris viridis =

Scientific classification
- Kingdom: Plantae
- Clade: Tracheophytes
- Clade: Angiosperms
- Clade: Eudicots
- Clade: Rosids
- Order: Rosales
- Family: Rhamnaceae
- Genus: Pomaderris
- Species: P. viridis

Binomial name
- Pomaderris viridis N.G.Walsh

Species of plant

Pomaderris viridis is a species of flowering plant in the family Rhamnaceae and is endemic to south-eastern continental Australia. It is a shrub or small tree with hairy young stems, egg-shaped to elliptic leaves, and panicles of cream-coloured to pale yellowish-green flowers.

== Description ==
Pomaderris viridis is a shrub or tree that typically grows to a height of 2–5 m (6 ft 7 in – 16 ft 5 in), its young stems densely covered with star-shaped hairs. The leaves are egg-shaped to elliptic, mostly 25–45 mm (0.98–1.77 in) long and 18–25 mm (0.71–0.98 in) wide on a petiole 4–9 mm (0.16–0.35 in) long and sometimes with serrated or wavy edges. Both surfaces of the leaves are covered with pale-coloured, star-shaped hairs and there are narrowly lance-shaped to linear stipules 3–4 mm (0.12–0.16 in) long at the base of the petiole, but that fall off as the leaf matures. The flowers are borne in panicles 50–80 mm (2.0–3.1 in) long near the ends of branchlets, and are cream-coloured to pale yellowish-green, each flower on a pedicel 1.5–3 mm (0.059–0.118 in) long. The sepals are 1.2–1.5 mm (0.047–0.059 in) long, and fall off as the flower matures and there are no petals. Flowering occurs in November.

== Taxonomy ==
Pomaderris viridis was first formally described in 2008 by Neville Grant Walsh in the journal Muelleria from specimens he collected in 1994 from Coolangubrah State Forest (now part of the South East Forests National Park). The specific epithet (viridis) means "green", referring to the general aspect of the plant and the relatively green upper and lower surfaces of the leaves.

== Distribution and habitat ==
This pomaderris grows in rocky sites, usually near watercourses in forest. It is found in isolated populations between Bemboka, Brogo and Towamba in south-eastern New South Wales. There is also a single record from Bellbird Creek in East Gippsland in Victoria.
