= Nunnock River =

Location
- Country: Australia
- State: New South Wales
- Region: South Eastern Highlands (IBRA), Monaro
- Municipality: Bega Valley

Physical characteristics
- Source: South Coast Range, Great Dividing Range
  - location: near Brown Mountain
  - coordinates: 36°39′S 149°25′E
  - elevation: 954 m (3,130 ft)
- Mouth: confluence with the Bemboka River
  - location: near Kallarney, Snowy Mountains Highway
  - elevation: 224 m (735 ft)
- Length: 8.2 km (5.1 mi)

Basin features
- River system: Bega River

The Nunnock River, a perennial stream of the Bega River catchment, is located in the Monaro region of New South Wales, Australia.

== Course and features ==
The Nunnock River rises below Bull Mountain in the South Coast Range, that is part of the Great Dividing Range, about 3 kilometres (1.9 mi) east of Brown Mountain; and flows generally southeast and northeast before reaching its confluence with the Bemboka River near the locale of Kallarney, adjacent to the Snowy Mountains Highway, approximately 6 kilometres (3.7 mi) west by north of Bemboka. The river descends 729 metres (2,392 ft) over its 8.2 kilometres (5.1 mi) course.

== See also ==
- List of rivers of Australia
- List of rivers of New South Wales (L–Z)
- Rivers of New South Wales
