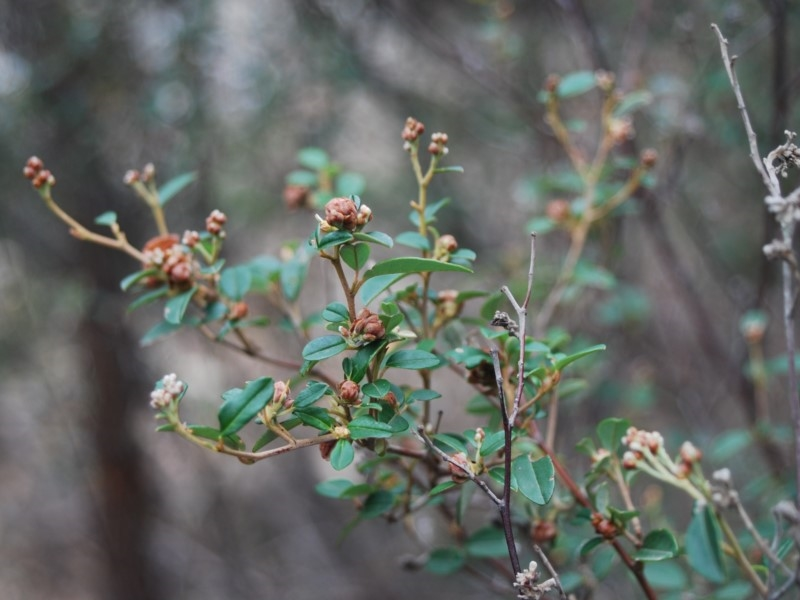
- Pomaderris delicata near Tarago

Conservation status
- Critically endangered (EPBC Act)

Scientific classification
- Kingdom: Plantae
- Clade: Tracheophytes
- Clade: Angiosperms
- Clade: Eudicots
- Clade: Rosids
- Order: Rosales
- Family: Rhamnaceae
- Genus: Pomaderris
- Species: P. delicata

Binomial name
- Pomaderris delicata N.G.Walsh & Coates

= Pomaderris delicata =

Delicate pomaderris

Species of shrub

Pomaderris delicata, commonly known as delicate pomaderris, is a species of flowering plant in the family Rhamnaceae and is endemic to a restricted area of New South Wales. It is a shrub with hairy young stems, elliptic leaves, and clusters of golden-yellow flowers.

== Description ==
Pomaderris delicata is a shrub that typically grows to a height of 1–2 m (3 ft 3 in – 6 ft 7 in), its young stems densely covered with greyish-yellow, star-shaped hairs. The leaves are elliptic, 13–30 mm (0.51–1.18 in) long and 5–15 mm (0.20–0.59 in) wide on a petiole 3–5 mm (0.12–0.20 in) long with triangular stipules 1–2 mm (0.039–0.079 in) long at the base but that fall off as the leaf develops. The upper surface of the leaves is glabrous and the lower surface densely covered with star-shaped hairs. The flowers are golden-yellow and hairy, borne in pyramid-shaped clusters or twenty to more than fifty, the clusters 15–40 mm (0.59–1.57 in) long on the ends of branchlets. The floral cup is 1 mm (0.039 in) in diameter, the sepals 1.7–2.0 mm (0.067–0.079 in) long and the petals 1.7–2 mm (0.067–0.079 in) long. Flowering occurs in October and the fruit is 2.5–3.5 mm (0.098–0.138 in) long.

== Taxonomy ==
Pomaderris delicata was first formally described in 1997 by Neville Grant Walsh and Fiona Coates and the description was published in the journal Muelleria from specimens collected by Walsh near Goulburn in 1995. The specific epithet (delicata) refers to the "dainty appearance of the plant".

== Distribution and habitat ==
Delicate pomaderris grows in moist forest in sheltered places near streams between Nerrigundah and Brogo in south-eastern New South Wales.

== Conservation status ==
Pomaderris delicata is listed as "critically endangered" under the Australian Government Environment Protection and Biodiversity Conservation Act 1999 and the New South Wales Government Biodiversity Conservation Act 2016. The main threats to the species include road and infrastructure works, and its small population size.
