= Brogo =

Australian locality

- Town
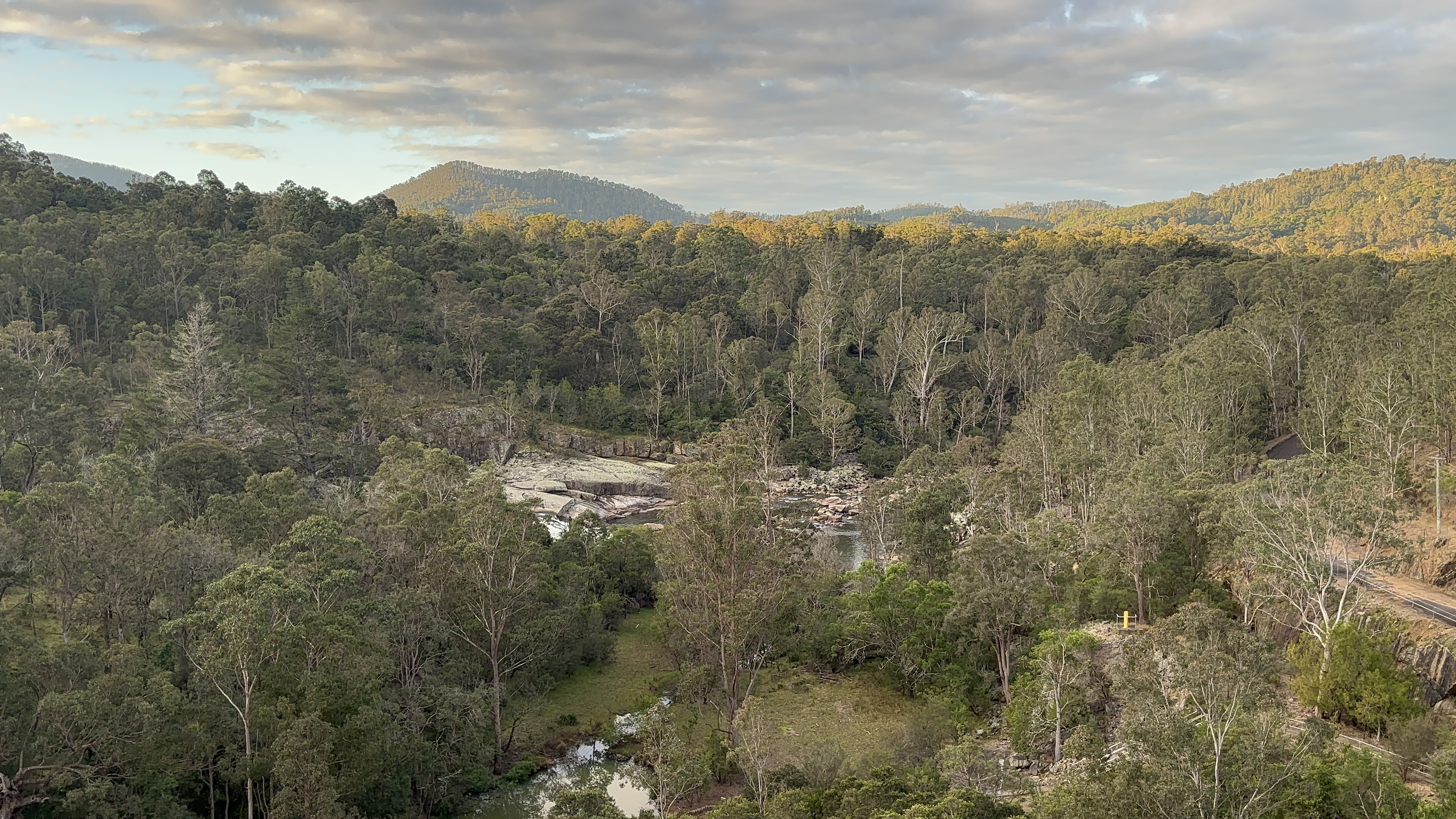
- Brogo from atop Brogo Dam

- Coordinates: 36°32′43.51″S 149°48′26″E
- Country: Australia
- State: New South Wales
- Region: Sapphire Coast
- LGA: Bega Valley Shire
- Location: 15 km (9.3 mi) N of Bega, New South Wales; 153 km (95 mi) SE of Canberra; 322 km (200 mi) SW of Sydney

Government
  - State electorate: Electoral district of Monaro
  - Federal division: Division of Eden-Monaro

Population
  - Total: 581 (2021 census)
- Postcode: 2550
- County: Auckland County
- Parish: Brogo
Localities around Brogo
| Verona, New South Wales | Cobargo | Quaama |
| Bemboka | Brogo | Biamanga National Park |
| Numbugga | Bega | Tathra, New South Wales |

Brogo (36°32′43.51″S 149°48′26″E), New South Wales, Australia, is a locality 15 km North of the town of Bega, in Bega Valley Shire. It consisting of mainly farmland, rural residential dwellings and National Parks. At the 2021 census, Brogo had a population of 581 people.

The locality is bounded by Wadbilliga National Park on the West and Mumbulla Mountain on the east. The Princes Highway passes through, following the Brogo River through the Brogo locality.

== Demographics ==
In the 2021 Census, there were 581 people in Brogo. 77.6 of people were born in Australia. The next most common countries of birth were England 4.8%, Switzerland 1.5%, New Zealand 1.0%, Wales 0.7% and Argentina 0.7%. Brogo's Aboriginal and/or Torres Strait Islander population is 6%. 89.3% of people only spoke English at home. The most common responses for religion were No Religion 53.4%, Anglican 14.5% and Catholic 12.2%.
