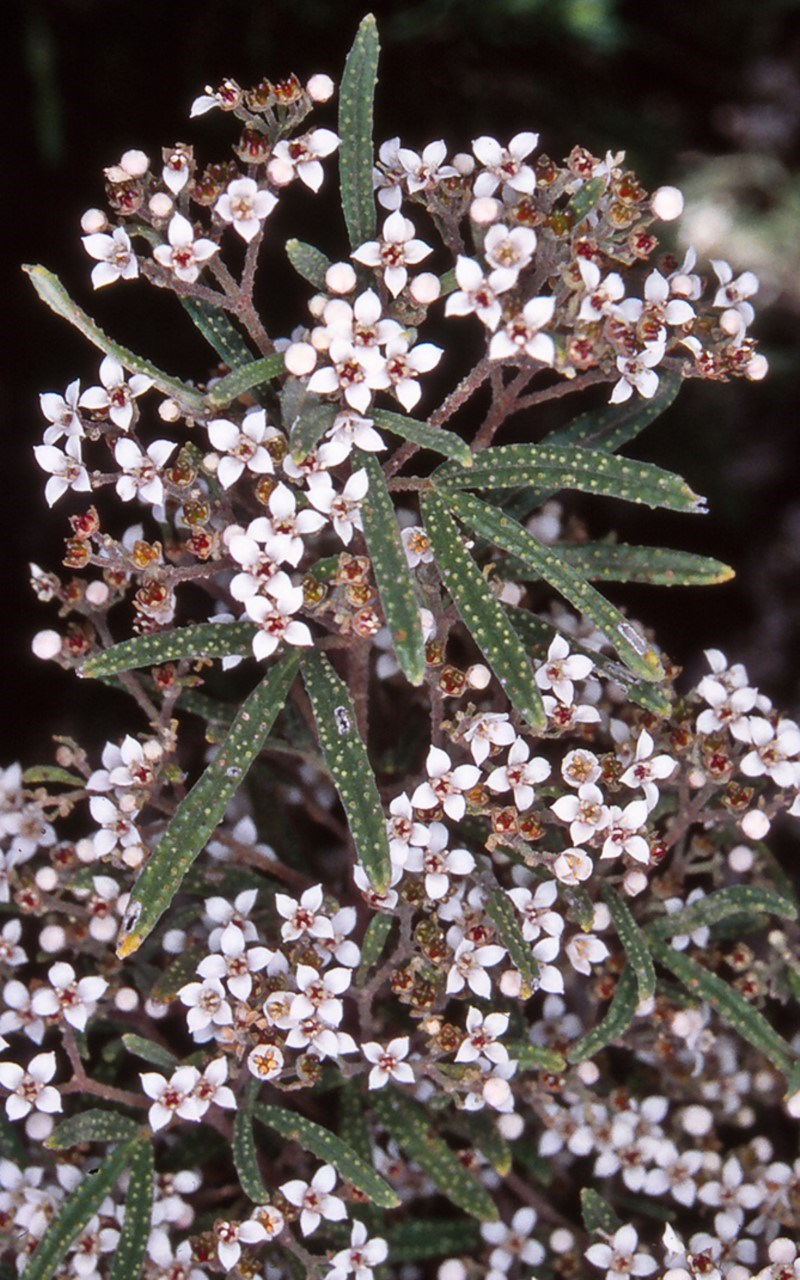
- Zieria parrisiae in the ANBG

Conservation status
- Vulnerable (EPBC Act)

Scientific classification
- Kingdom: Plantae
- Clade: Tracheophytes
- Clade: Angiosperms
- Clade: Eudicots
- Clade: Rosids
- Order: Sapindales
- Family: Rutaceae
- Genus: Zieria
- Species: Z. parrisiae

Binomial name
- Zieria parrisiae J.D.Briggs & J.A.Armstr.

= Zieria parrisiae =

Parris' zieria

Species of plant

Zieria parrisiae, commonly known as Parris' zieria, is a plant in the citrus family Rutaceae and is endemic to a small area near Pambula on the south coast of New South Wales. It is a bushy shrub with warty, clover-like leaves composed of three leaflets and in spring there are clusters of up to 24 white to pale yellow flowers with four petals, near the ends of the branches.

== Description ==
Zieria parrisiae is a bushy shrub or small tree which sometimes grows to a height of 9 m (30 ft). Its younger branches are warty and covered with star-like hairs. The leaves are composed of three lance-shaped leaflets on a petiole 2–40 mm (0.08–2 in) long and the central leaflet is 25–35 mm (0.98–1.4 in) long and 3–4 mm (0.1–0.2 in) wide. The upper surface of the leaflets is dark green, warty and more or less glabrous while the lower surface is a lighter green and covered with velvety, star-like hairs. Clusters of between 9 and 25 white to pale yellow flowers are arranged in leaf axils, the clusters about the same length as the leaves. The clusters are surrounded by bracts which remain during flowering. Each flower has four triangular sepal lobes 1–2 mm (0.04–0.08 in) long and four spoon-shaped petals about 2.5 mm (0.1 in) long and covered with soft hairs. There are four stamens. Flowering occurs in October and November and is followed in December and January by fruit which is a warty, glabrous, four-chambered capsule.

== Taxonomy and naming ==
Zieria parrisiae was first formally described in 2002 by John D. Briggs and James Andrew Armstrong from a specimen collected west of Pambula and the description was published in Australian Systematic Botany.

== Distribution and habitat ==
Parris' zieria grows in tall open forest in Wadbilliga National Park, the South East Forests National Park and near Cochrane Dam.

== Conservation ==
This zieria is listed as "vulnerable" under the New South Wales Threatened Species Conservation Act and as "vulnerable" under the Commonwealth Government Environment Protection and Biodiversity Conservation Act 1999 (EPBC) Act. The main threat to the species is the small size of each of its populations.
