= The Cobargo Chronicle =

Former Australian newspaper

The Cobargo Chronicle was and English language newspaper published in Cobargo, New South Wales, Australia.

Front page of The Cobargo Chronicle, 16 December 1898

== Newspaper history ==
The Cobargo Chronicle was a weekly newspaper first published on 18 November 1898 by William Boot in Cobargo, New South Wales. The newspaper was originally titled The Cobargo Chronicle and South Coast Journal and was devoted to "the interests of the Dairying, Mining and Agricultural industries established in the large and populous district in which it circulates". Subscriptions were priced at one pound per annum and the paper was printed Friday mornings from the offices situated on Moruya Road, Cobargo.

The proprietor of the newspaper, William Boot, had earlier established The Cobargo Watch on 18 January 1890 also using the subtitle of South Coast Journal. Boot sold the paper on 4 June 1892 to local chemist John Joseph O'Reilly and stood for election in June 1891 but failed to win a seat in the state parliament of New South Wales. Boot later relocated to Sydney to further "benefit humanity by patenting Boot's Indigestion Cure". O'Reilly ran The Cobargo Watch until he sold the newspaper to Albert Edward walker on 20 October 1894. Walker continued publishing The Cobargo Watch until it closed on 21 October 1898.

Boot again returned to the district of Cobargo and established The Cobargo Chronicle on 18 November 1898.

== Digitisation ==
The Cobargo Chronicle has been digitised as part of the Australian Newspapers Digitisation Program of the National Library of Australia.

== See also ==
- List of newspapers in New South Wales
- List of newspapers in Australia
