= Dry River (New South Wales) =

River in New South Wales, Australia

Coordinates: 36°30′S 149°55′E

Dry River Murrah River

Location
- Country: Australia
- State: New South Wales
- Region: South East Corner (IBRA), South Coast
- Local government area: Bega Valley

Physical characteristics
- Source: Kyebeyan Range, Great Dividing Range
  - location: west of Cobargo
- Mouth: confluence with the Mumbulla Creek to form Murrah River
  - location: near Quaama

Basin features
- River system: Murrah River

Dry River is a perennial river of the Murrah River catchment, located in the South Coast region of New South Wales, Australia.

== Course and features ==
Dry River rises below Murrabrine Mountain on the eastern slopes of the Kybeyan Range, that is part of the Great Dividing Range, located approximately 10 kilometres (6.2 mi) west of Cobargo and flows generally southeast before reaching its confluence with the Mumbulla Creek to form the Murrah River, approximately 10 kilometres (6.2 mi) southeast by south of Quaama.

== See also ==
- Rivers of New South Wales
- List of rivers of New South Wales (A–K)
- List of rivers of Australia
