= Mount Adrah =

Rural locality in the Riverina region of New South Wales

- Town
- Coordinates: 35.2366°S 147.9615°E
- Country: Australia
- State: New South Wales
- LGA: Cootamundra-Gundagai Regional Council
- Location: 418 km (260 mi) SW of Sydney; 112 km (70 mi) W of Canberra; 66 km (41 mi) E of Wagga Wagga; 30 km (19 mi) E of Gundagai
- Established: 1843

Government
  - State electorate: Wagga Wagga
  - Federal division: Riverina
- Elevation: 400 m (1,300 ft)

Population
  - Total: 59
- Postcode: 2729

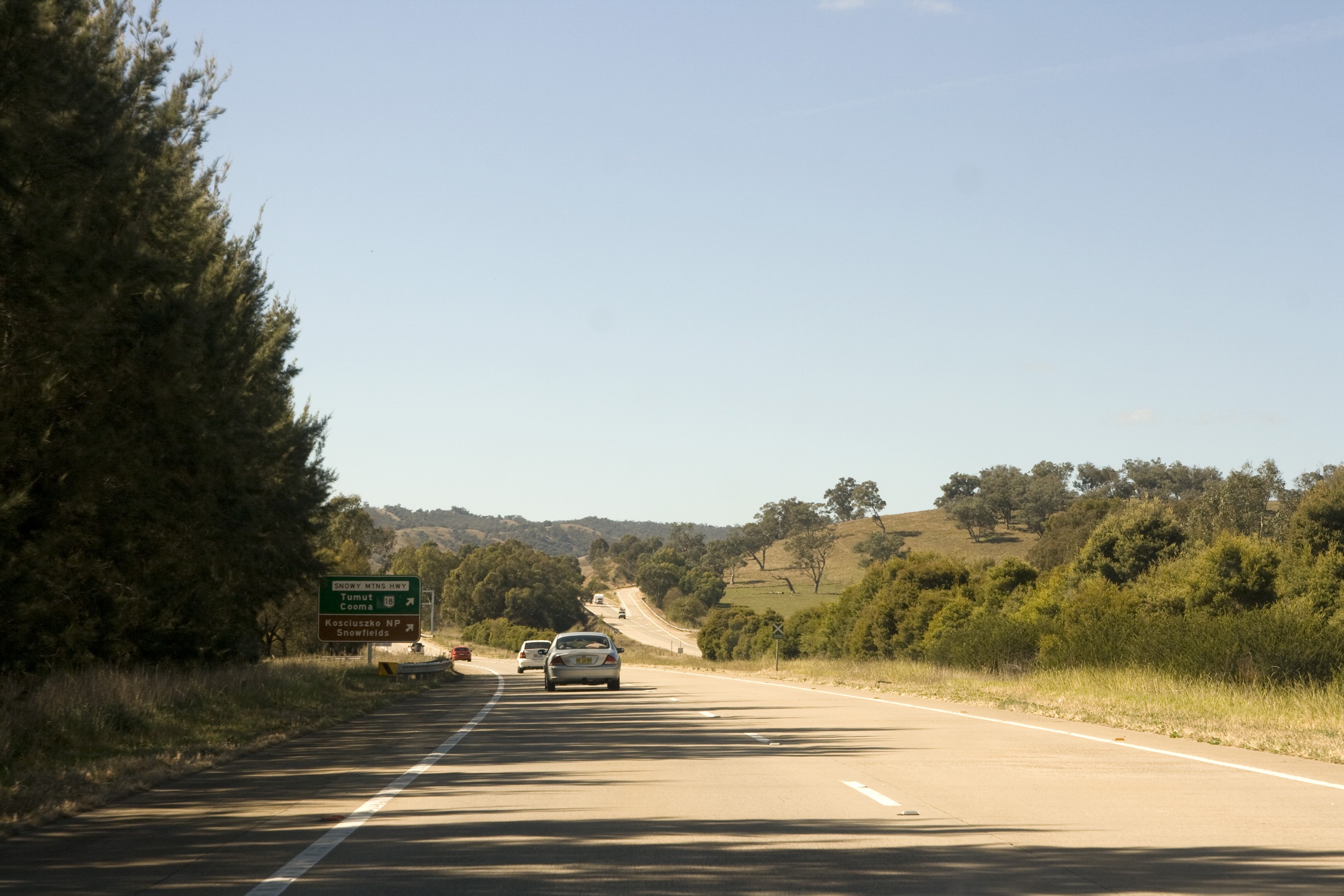
View of the Hume Highway near Mount Adrah, New South Wales.

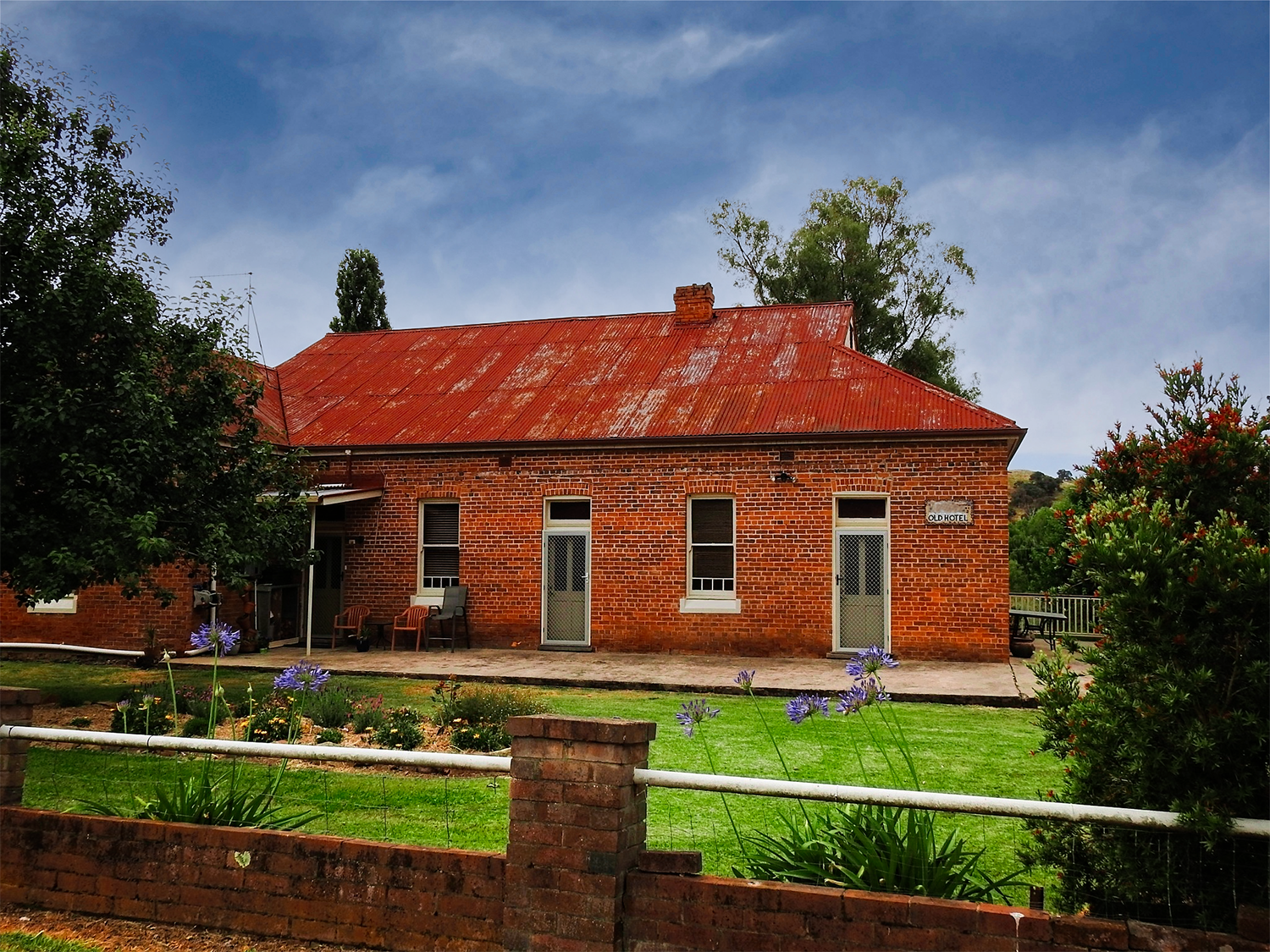
The Mount Adrah Hotel, built in 1916–1917 to replace the original structure licensed by Irvine Crain (now a private residence).

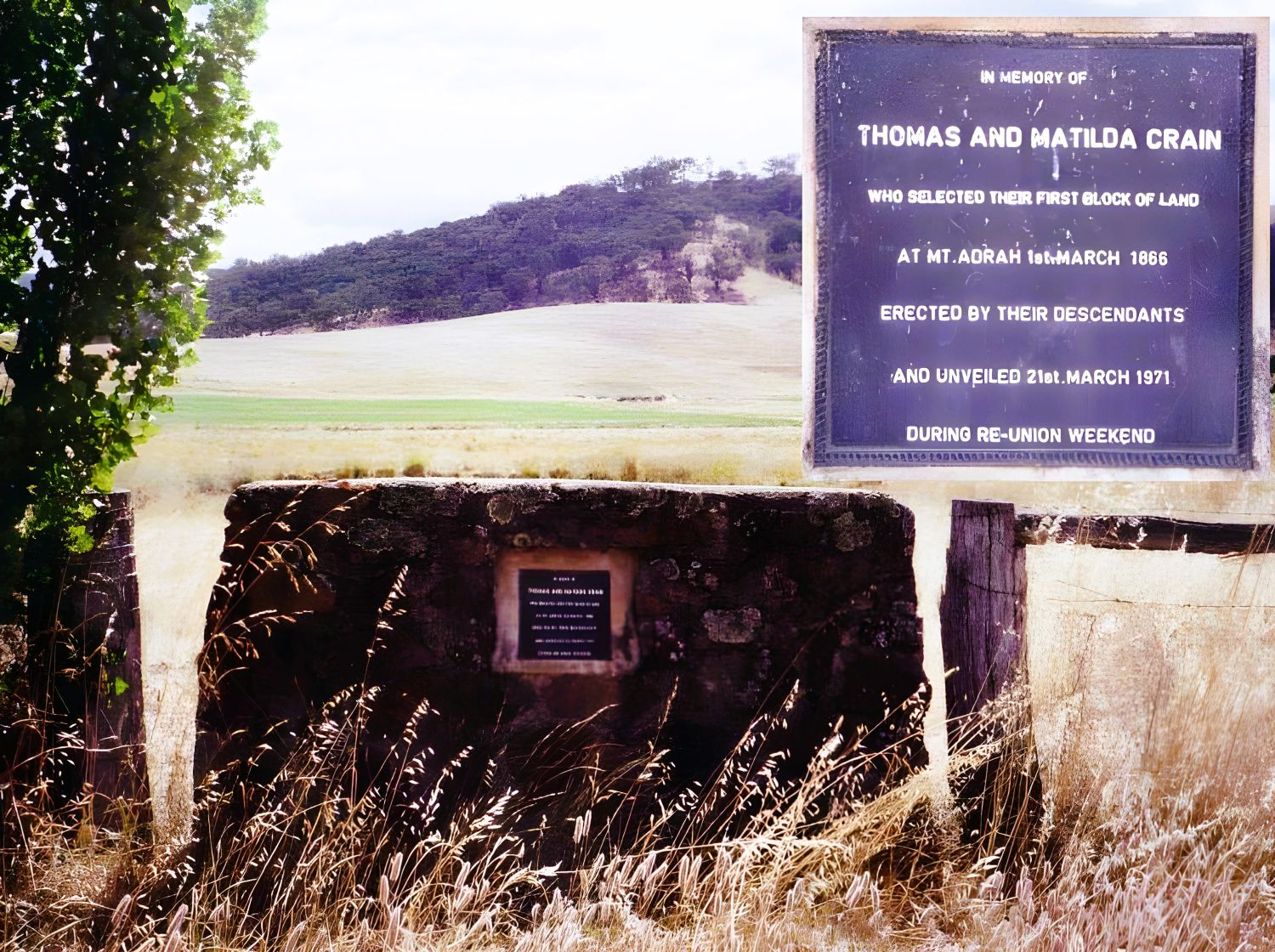
Memorial wall commemorating Thomas and Matilda Crain, early settlers of Mount Adrah, NSW. Unveiled 21 March 1971 by descendants on the original selection site from 1866.

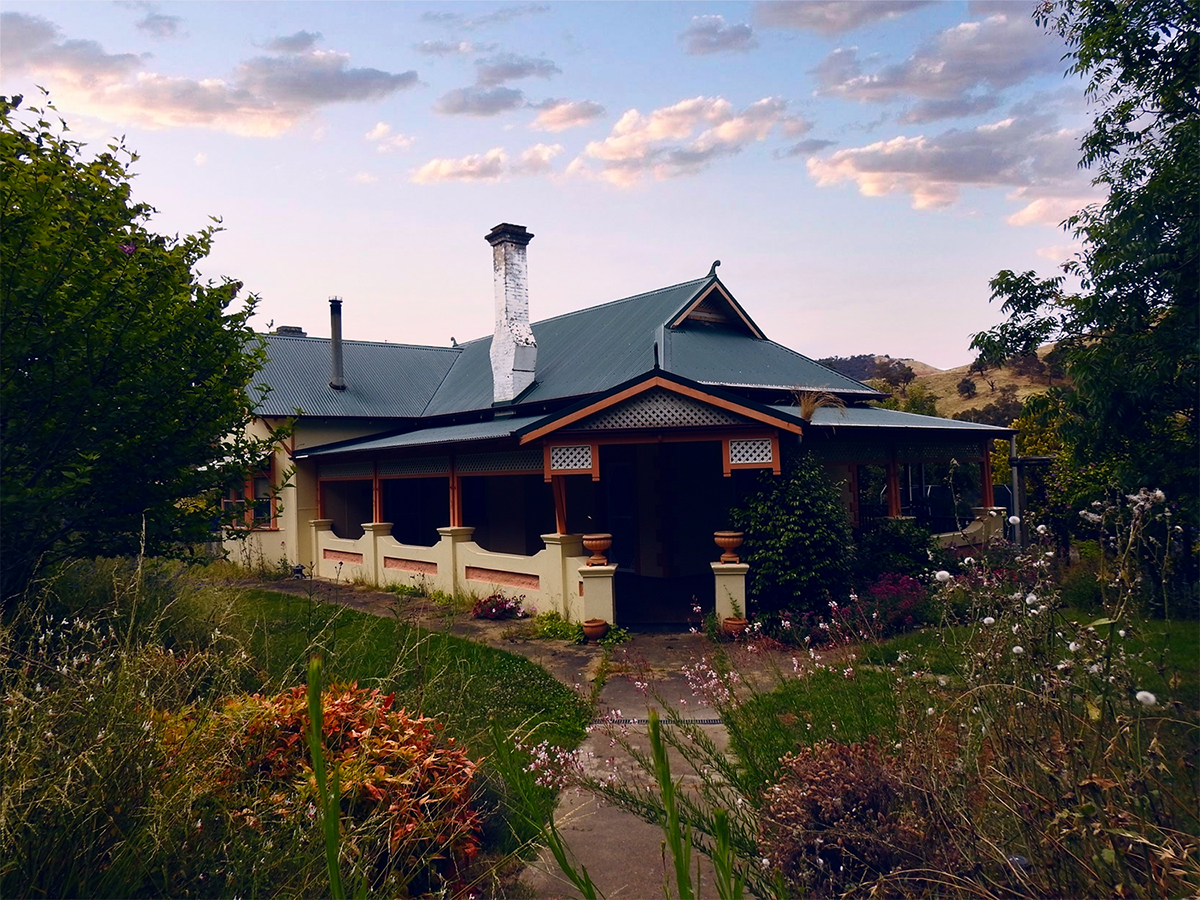
Former Mount Adrah Public School building (now a private residence).

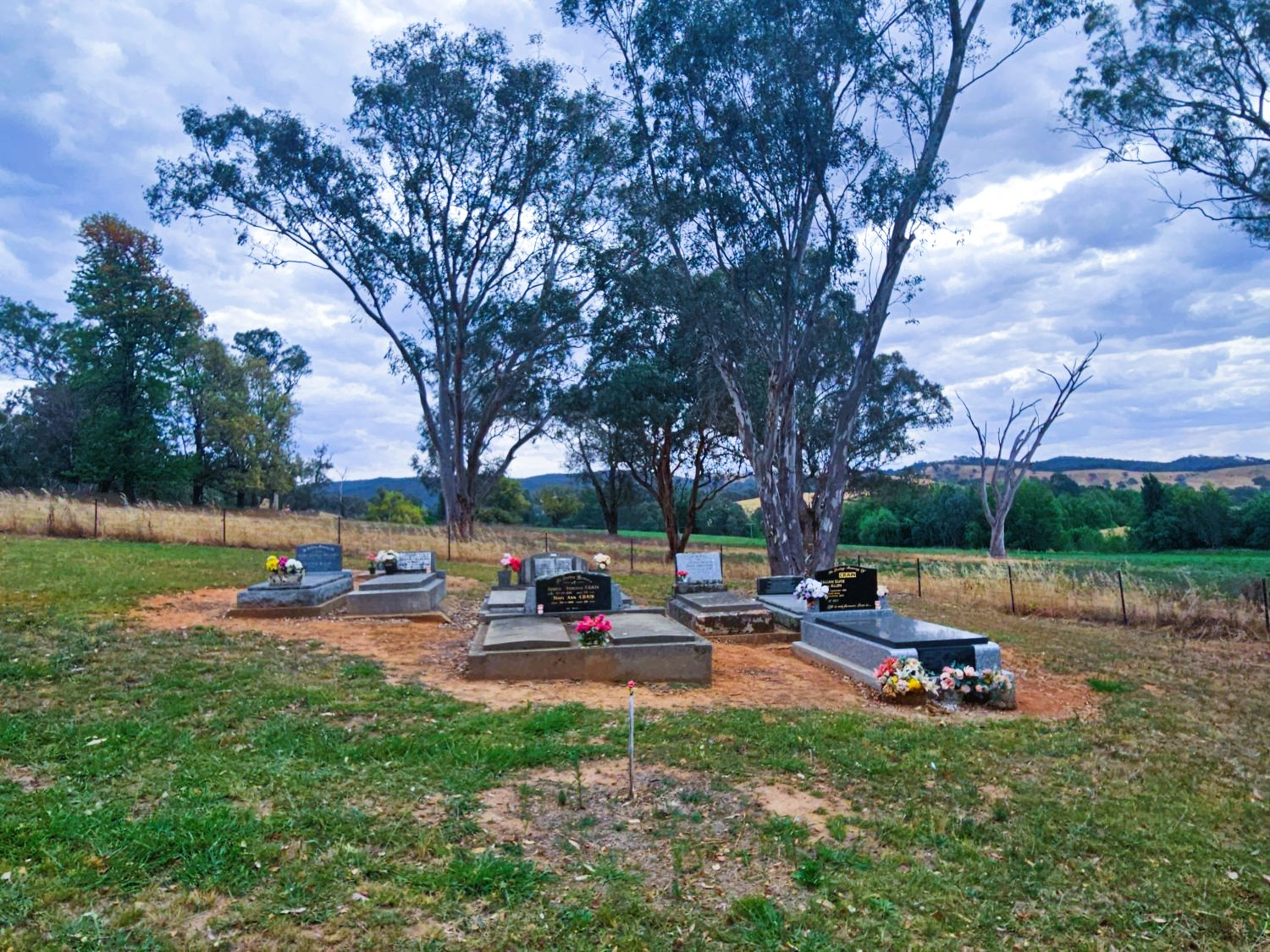
View of Mount Adrah Cemetery, New South Wales.

Mount Adrah is a rural locality in the Riverina region of New South Wales, Australia. It is situated along the Snowy Mountains Highway, near its junction with the Hume Highway, approximately 112 kilometres west of Canberra, within the Cootamundra-Gundagai Regional Council area. The locality has historical associations with agricultural and gold exploration.

== Geography ==
Mount Adrah lies on the traditional lands of the Wiradjuri people, one of the largest Aboriginal groups in New South Wales. For tens of thousands of years, Wiradjuri people managed these lands through cultural practices, including firestick farming and seasonal land use.

The locality is situated in the foothills of the Great Dividing Range and is surrounded by farmland and remnant native vegetation. Nearby towns are Adelong, Cootamundra, Gundagai, Nangus, and Tumblong with regional access to Tumut and Wagga Wagga.

== History ==
European settlement in the Mount Adrah district began in the mid-19th century as part of the broader expansion of pastoral runs across southern New South Wales. The area attracted settlers for its grazing potential along the Murrumbidgee River and its tributaries, timber harvesting and small scale gold exploration. Early landholdings were established under Crown leases, primarily for sheep and cattle grazing, and later subdivided following land reform policies in the late 1800s.

In 1841, William Sawyer held a pasturage license in the Murrumbidgee district, and by 1845, the run was jointly held with John Dean under the name "Mount Adra". Their holdings included cultivated land and livestock, reflecting the area's early use for sheep and cattle grazing. After Sawyer relocated to Bethungra in 1869, management passed to his sons, and later to Job Dunn following Sawyer's death in 1873.

Irish immigrants Thomas and Matilda Crain selected property near Spring Creek at Mount Adrah in 1866. The family constructed a slab hut and established farming operations, later expanding their holdings over subsequent decades to include Mount Adrah Station, Mount Adrah Hotel, Bangadang Station, turkey farm and diary.

By the 1860s, Mount Adrah had become a main stopover point for travellers, including bullock teams and horse drawn transport, before the final stage of the journey to Tumut. A license was issued to Job Dunn for a public house named The Mount Adra Inn. The license then passed to James Nichols under the name The Vineyard Hotel. In 1881, Thomas and Matilda's son, Irvine Crain, often recorded as Irwin Crain, obtained the publican's license for the premises, which he renamed the Mount Adrah Hotel.

The hotel provided accommodation and meals, and hosted public meetings, sporting events, and community gatherings into the early 20th century. Operations ceased temporarily in 1914 when Irvine Crain retired and the family moved to Sydney, marking the end of the original hotel building's use as a licensed premises. The current red brick Mount Adrah Hotel, now a private residence, was constructed by the Crain family between 1916–1917, replacing the earlier building. The rebuilt hotel continued to operate as an inn providing accommodation into the early 1930s.

Irvine Crain married Jane Whiticker, daughter of Richard and Mary Ann Whiticker of Jellingroo, Mundarlo, in the Gundagai district. The couple built their first home near the "Big S" bend of Nacki Nacki Creek before taking over the Mount Adrah Hotel. Previously, Irvine and his brother Andrew had constructed a homestead on Mount Adrah Station. It was destroyed during the widespread bushfires that swept through the region on New Year's Day in 1905, known as Black Sunday. The homestead was later rebuilt, continuing as the Crain family residence and the centre of operations for Mount Adrah Station.

Irvine's younger brother, William Crain, took up land in the northern part of Mount Adrah and expanded his holding over time, naming the property Bangadang. During the 1905 bushfires, reports noted that his holdings were swept by fire, but the house was prevented from catching alight.

The Mount Adrah district has experienced several significant bushfires since European settlement, including Black Sunday in 1905, which was described as causing enormous devastation with serious loss of life and property. More than a century later, during the 2019–2020 bushfire season, the area was again affected by fire activity, including the Dunns Road Fire, which led to the temporary closure of the Hume Highway near Tumblong. Warnings were issued for residents between Tarcutta and Adelong, with fire crews responding to rapidly changing conditions. Highfield Farm & Woodland, a regenerative farming property at Mount Adrah, was among those impacted, later recognised with a produce award for its recovery and land stewardship efforts.

Another of the Crain brothers, Samuel Lindsay Crain, served on local government bodies in the district, including appointment to the Provisional Council of the Shire of Tumut in 1928. He also served as a councillor of Tumut Shire and, for a time, Shire president.

In March 1971, a memorial wall with a bronze plaque was erected by descendants at the site where Thomas and Matilda Crain first selected land at Mount Adrah on 1 March 1866. The marker, located on the Snowy Mountains Highway, continues to commemorate the Crain family’s connection to the district.

== Economy ==
Mount Adrah's economy is primarily agricultural, with sheep and cattle grazing continuing as the dominant land uses. Farmgate sales, small-scale cropping, and the production of rural goods contribute to the area's economic activity. Tourism plays a modest role, supported by farm-based accommodation and the locality's proximity to heritage towns and natural reserves.

=== Agriculture ===
Farming has been central to Mount Adrah's development since the mid-19th century. The locality's rolling hills, reliable watercourses, and proximity to regional transport routes support a mix of livestock grazing and cropping reflective of the wider Riverina region. Sheep and cattle production have long been the mainstays of local agriculture, complemented historically by dairy and turkey farming, as well as hay, grain, and potato cultivation. Early settler families established broadacre farms and small-scale operations that contributed to the district's overall productivity.

During the 1880s, sections of land at Mount Adrah were leased to Chinese tenants for tobacco cultivation. Reports from the period described the crops as high quality, and the enterprise was noted as an example of successful agricultural collaboration, with named tenants including Ah Foo, Ah Gaw, Ah Hee, and Ah Moi.

Merino wool production remains an important part of Mount Adrah's agricultural identity. Paul Graham of Blyth Merino Stud at Mount Adrah achieved top fleece returns, with 15.8 micron wool selling at $19.50 per kilogram (2022).

Bangadang continues as a grazing property, listed in regional cattle sale catalogues under the Crain name, including Poll Hereford steers in an AuctionsPlus feature sale at Tumut/Adelong (9 August 2024) and Angus and Black Baldy steers in the Tumut/Adelong store cattle sale catalogue (9 April 2025).

Highfield Farm and Woodland have also been recognised through regional and state-level produce awards for Grass-fed Dorpher Lamb.

=== Gold mining ===
Mount Adrah lies along the Gilmore Suture within the Lachlan Fold Belt, a geologically significant zone known for its gold-bearing deposits. The Mount Adrah Gold Project, operated by Wildcat Resources Limited, explores several mineralised zones in the area, including the Hobbs Pipe deposit, which has been reported to contain an estimated 770,000 ounces of gold. Other identified prospects include Hillas Creek–Yaven, Upper Spring Creek, Diggers Creek, Hill 303, and the Bangadang–Nacki Nacki corridor.

Gold mining activity in the Mount Adrah district dates back to the 1850s. In 1859, gold was discovered at Sawyer's Station on the Mount Adrah side of the Murrumbidgee River, where quartz specimens were described as being rich in gold. Reports at the time suggested the discovery had the potential to attract hundreds of miners to the area. By 1862, a site known as Stephen's Diggings, located between Mount Adrah and the Tarcutta Inn, was under active development. Shafts were sunk and a water race constructed to aid sluicing, despite ongoing difficulties with flooding.

In 1884, a report cautioned against a premature rush to Nacki Nacki Creek near Crain's Mount Adrah Hotel. While local resident James Nichols reportedly found an ounce of gold in slate crevices, the area was described as difficult to work, with low yields and unreliable water supplies. Two years later in 1886, The Empire reported that Mr Crain held rights to a gold claim at Mount Adrah, where miners paid £1 per month for access. The site reportedly produced an average yield of three pennyweights per load. A crushing in 1889 from Colt's Reef yielded 3 oz 16 dwt per ton, described as "above expectations."

Another phase of activity began in May 1890 with the reopening of a reef known as the "New Eldorado" on Crain land near Grahamstown. Operated under a 40-acre conditional lease by J.D. Brown, this site was reported to contain gold-bearing quartz and to help generate employment in the district.

=== Tourism and natural attractions ===
Tourism and conservation initiatives in Mount Adrah reflect the locality’s balance between agricultural heritage and the preservation of its natural environment. Mount Adrah and its surrounding region offer a combination of natural features, heritage sites, and outdoor recreation.

The locality lies within the Tumblong State Conservation Area, a 746-hectare reserve that protects remnant bushland, native species, and sections of the Yaven and Nacki Nacki Creeks. The conservation area forms part of the broader ecological corridor focused on revegetation and biodiversity conservation effort along the Yaven Creek–Nacki Nacki region.

The nearby Ellerslie Nature Reserve supports biodiversity conservation through its protected bushland, walking trails, and habitat for endangered ecosystems. Located along the Murrumbidgee River corridor, the reserve helps preserve the region's remnant woodlands and supports species unique to the Riverina bioregion

A Riverina Highlands Landcare field day was held in November 2022 at Mount Adrah, showcasing productive farming practices alongside conservation efforts within Box‑Gum Grassy Woodland habitats.

Mount Adrah operators were recognised at the 2024 NSW Tourism Awards as part of the Destination Riverina Murray region, highlighting the area's significance in sustainable and experiential tourism. Rural and nature-based accommodation at Mount Adrah provides farm-based experiences with stargazing, workshops and outdoor activities.

- Highfield Farm & Woodland is a working property that integrates regenerative agriculture with biodiversity conservation. It operates a mixed flock of sheep and alpacas and offers eco-accommodation, guided woodland walks, cultural tours, and sustainability workshops. In 2025, The Kestrel Nest EcoHut on Highfield Farm & Woodlands was certified as Australia's first International DarkSky Approved Lodge, reflecting the farm's established ecolodge credentials and stargazing experience.
- Hillview Farmstay provides farm accommodation and glamping, with interactive animal feeding, bushwalking, and panoramic views of the surrounding countryside. The property also contributes to regional tourism by promoting local produce, supporting nearby attractions, and showcasing the area's agricultural heritage.
- Nacki Nacki Hipcamp, a hosted camping property in a rural setting near the Nacki Nacki Creek, complements the district’s small-scale agritourism offerings.

Several nearby towns contribute to the region's heritage and visitor appeal. Gundagai, located on the Hume Highway, is known for its historic precinct and the Dog on the Tuckerbox monument. Adelong features the Adelong Falls Gold Workings and Adelong Alive Museum, both of which interpret the district's gold mining heritage. The Canola Trail, linking the towns of Temora, Junee, and Coolamon, showcases agricultural history and seasonal canola blooms across the Riverina region. Tumut provides access to outdoor recreation and the alpine landscapes in Kosciuszko National Park via the Snowy Mountains Highway.

== Demographics ==
According to the 2021 Census, Mount Adrah had a population of 59 people, with a median age of 44. The most commonly reported ancestries were Australian, English and Irish. English was the only language spoken at home. This represented an increase from the 2016 Census when Mount Adrah had a population of 37 people, and a median age of 46.

== Education and public services ==
A provisional school was proposed for Mount Adrah in 1870 and formally established as a public school in 1875. By 1873, the school had 36 enrolled students with an average daily attendance of 26, which was considered satisfactory for a rural school at the time.

The Council of Education formally announced the establishment of the Mount Adrah Public School in August 1875, and tenders were called the following year for the construction of a permanent school building. A public school board was formed in 1877 with members including Thomas Crain, George Henry Dennis, and John Elliott.

Local residents raised concerns about the safety of creek crossings at Nacki Nacki and Yaven Yaven Creeks which affected school attendance during floods. In response, footbridges were constructed in 1875 to improve access.

In May 1901, a new bridge was constructed across Yaven Creek to improve road access to the locality. The opening was marked by a community fete attended by local residents and the Mount Adrah Progress Committee. Members of the committee included D. Jordan (chairman), Irwin (Irvine) Crain, E. Hassett, Robert Prowse, John Craig Jr., James Craig, and John Williams.

== Religion and civic administration ==
The St Paul's Anglican church was opened in May 1902 by Reverend E. J. Spencer. The small building, located between the Mount Adrah Public School and the Mount Adrah Hotel, was constructed to seat up to 100 worshippers. Contemporary reports noted a large turnout at the opening service, with a formal dedication by the bishop expected to follow.

The Mount Adrah Cemetery is maintained by the Cootamundra-Gundagai Regional Council and contains 17 recorded burials, most of whom are members of the Crain family. The cemetery was officially gazetted in 1901, with trustees appointed from among the local community including Irvine Crain, David Jordan, Robert Prowse, James Craig, John Craig Jr., and John Williams.

== Sport and recreation ==
Mount Adrah supported a range of community sporting activities between the 1860s and early 20th century, including horse racing, cricket, and rugby league.

Annual race meetings were held at the Mount Adrah Inn on Anniversary Day during the mid-19th century, attracting visitors from surrounding districts. A meeting held in February 1869 reportedly drew around 200 attendees from Tarcutta and Adelong Creek (Tumblong), followed by a supper and ball. By 1872, the inn had become known as the Vineyard Hotel and hosted Queen's Birthday and Easter Monday races, which included pigeon match competitions. By 1881, operating as the Mount Adrah Hotel, the establishment continued to play a vital role in community life.

Cricket was also prominent in the district. In January 1885, the Mount Adrah team played against Adelong for the Wilson Cup, followed by a match against Tarcutta for the Brown Cup, with William and George Crain among the players. In 1887, Mount Adrah won the Bardwell Cup in a match against Sharpe Creek. A local meeting was held at the Crain's Mount Adrah Hotel in January 1890 to re-establish the cricket club. Mr G. K. Cole was appointed secretary, and a committee was formed to manage club operations and resolve outstanding debts. The following year, Mr Cole resigned and was replaced by Irvine Crain as the secretary and J. Crain as treasurer, with Andrew Crain contributing financially to help settle the club's obligations.

Rugby League reached the district by 1900, with local teams forming in the surrounding areas. Mount Adrah established a football club in August 1909. The team's first recorded match was against Sandy Gully and was noted in The Gundagai Independent for its unconventional officiating and lively play. In September 1911, Mount Adrah played a friendly match against Adelong, winning 22–0 on Adelong's home ground. The first half was closely contested, with Mount Adrah leading 9–0, before extending their lead in the second half. The match was part of an ongoing friendly rivalry between the towns and concluded with a community dinner.
