= GlobalDoodle =

Website

globalDoodle Pty. Ltd.
- Industry: Internet
- Founded: 3 May 2011; 15 years ago
- Headquarters: Bemboka, New South Wales, Australia
- Key people: Helmut Eder, Neil Domselaar, Founders.
- Revenue: Unknown
- Website: www.globalDoodle.com

GlobalDoodle was a website which allowed users to draw, either individually or collaboratively in real time, on a giant, digital piece of paper measuring 16 km^{2}.

== History ==
Development on globalDoodle started in October 2010, launching a 6-week beta testing period in March 2011. The launch team consisted of Helmut Eder and Neil Domselaar.

The site came out of beta testing and officially launched on 3 May 2011. The site was closed down in 2015.

== Site Overview ==
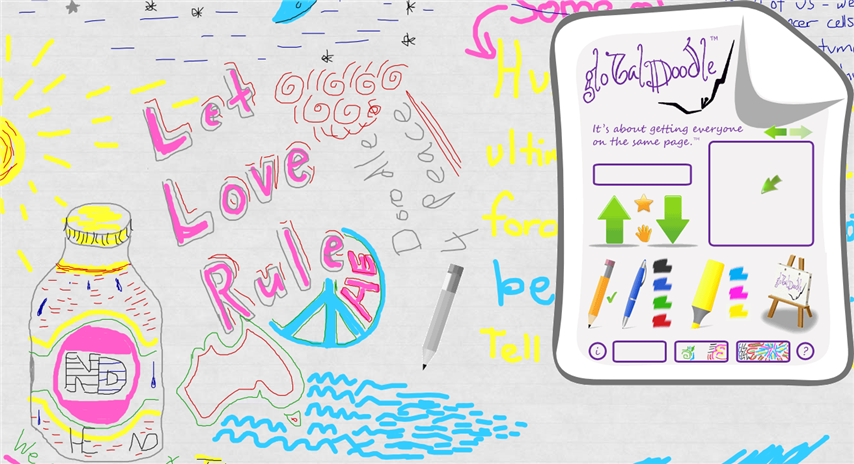
globalDoodle's original homepage.

Designed by Helmut Eder and Neil Domselaar, globalDoodle went live in May 2011. It does not require a registration or log-in and allows people to express what they feel. The designs can be locked or left open to allow others to contribute. Each design has a unique code so it can easily be found and shared. Inspiration for globalDoodle came from the thought of "getting everyone on the same page" and allowing artistic expression (and scribbles as well) to be shared with the world.

One of the characteristics that sets globalDoodle apart is the use of the HTML5 standard to allow drawing natively in the browser without the need for browser plug-ins.

== Reception ==
In its first year of activity after launch, globalDoodle was visited approximately 27,000 times; 58 km of doodles were created, filling 558 square meters of the page.

== Sources ==
- Kaplanseren, Erdal (4 May 2013). "HTML5 tabanlı en güzel 10 site Dünyanın en büyük çizimine katkıda bulunun". Hürriyet.com.
- Campbell, Ian (24 June 2011). "Global Doodle springs from the hills at Bemboka". ABC South East Radio. Archived from the original on 4 March 2016.
- Parrack, Dave (28 June 2012). "Help Create Communal Art With globalDoodle". MakeUseOf. Archived from the original on 6 July 2012.
- AnandK@TWC (7 June 2012). "globalDoodle: A fun site for you and your kids". The Windows Club. Archived from the original on 10 June 2012.
- Belmont, Veronica (19 July 2012). "Collaboratively Doodle with the Entire World!". Tekzilla. Archived from the original on 10 April 2016.
- Yang, Brian (24 July 2012). "Doodle with the World Using globalDoodle". tech airlines. Archived from the original on 31 July 2012.
- TechPax.com (20 July 2012). "Global Doodle: Draw on Huge Canvas with the Rest of the World". TechPax.com. Archived from the original on 1 May 2013.
