= Cochrane Dam (New South Wales) =

- Location of the Cochrane Dam in New South Wales
- Country: Australia
- Location: South Coast, New South Wales
- Coordinates: 36°33′54″S 149°27′04″E
- Purpose: Hydro-power, irrigation
- Status: Operational
- Opening date: 1958

Dam and spillways
- Type of dam: Embankment dam
- Impounds: Georges Creek
- Height: 29 m (95 ft)
- Length: 199 m (653 ft)
- Dam volume: 116 m (381 ft)
- Spillways: 1
- Spillway type: Labyrinth weir
- Spillway capacity: 630 m^{3}/s (22,000 cu ft/s)

Reservoir
- Creates: Cochrane Lake
- Total capacity: 4,320 ML (153×10^{6} cu ft)
- Active capacity: 2,770 ML (98×10^{6} cu ft)
- Catchment area: 34.7 km^{2} (13.4 sq mi)

Power Station
- Operator: Cochrane dam Pty ltd
- Commission date: 1943
- Type: Conventional
- Turbines: 2
- Installed capacity: 4.95 MW (6,640 hp)

Cochrane Dam is a minor earthfill embankment dam with concrete spillway across Georges Creek, located in the South Coast region of New South Wales, Australia. The main purpose of the dam is to supply water for hydro-power at the downstream Brown Mountain Power Station and for irrigation purposes. The impounded reservoir is called Cochrane Lake.

== Location and features ==
Completed in 1958, the Cochrane Dam is a minor ungated dam, located approximately 13 kilometres (8.1 mi) north-west of the village of Bemboka. The dam was built by Thiess Bros Pty Limited on behalf of Pacific Power as water storage to assist the control of water flows to the Brown Mountain Power Station, and to supply water for irrigation in the Bega Valley.

The dam wall constructed with 116 cubic metres (4,100 cu ft) of earth fill is 29 metres (95 ft) high and 199 metres (653 ft) long. At 100% capacity, with a full supply level of RL910.13, the dam has a storage capacity of 4,320 megalitres (153×10^{6} cu ft) of which 2,770 megalitres (98×10^{6} cu ft) is active storage. The catchment area of Cochrane Lake is 37.7 square kilometres (14.6 sq mi). The uncontrolled concrete spillway is capable of discharging 630 cubic metres per second (22,000 cu ft/s) at maximum flood level.

== Brown Mountain Power Station ==
A run-of-the-river and now, conventional hydro-electric power station, called Brown Mountain Power Station, is located on the eastern escarpment of the Great Dividing Range inland from Bega and downstream from the dam wall, on the Bemboka River. The power station commenced generating electricity in 1943 and was originally owned and operated by the Bega Valley County Council (since merged). Brown Mountain Power Station was initially commissioned with five high pressure turbo generators, with a generating capacity of 4.5 megawatts (6,000 hp) of electricity, generated from the run-of-the-river of Bemboka River. Later, the creation of the Cochrane Dam, regulated flows of water on the Rutherford Creek to the Brown Mountain Power Station and to meet the irrigation requirements of the Bega Valley catchment.

In 2006 an A$6 million upgrade of facilities at the power station was completed with the installation of a new 4.2 megawatts (5,600 hp) generating unit, supplied with water from Cochrane Dam. Unit 3 was upgraded with automatic controls; and water supplied from Rutherford Creek for power generation. Units 1, 2, 4 & 5 were decommissioned. Following completion of the project, the station has a total generating capacity of 4.95 megawatts (6,640 hp).

Brown Mountain Power Station is connected to the 66 kV transmission line running between Cooma and Bega substations.

== See also ==
- List of dams and reservoirs in New South Wales
