= Bega Valley County Council =

Former county council in NSW, Australia

Agency overview
- Dissolved: 1980
- Superseding agency: Illawarra County Council

Bega Valley County Council was a county council in the Australian state of New South Wales, responsible for electricity distribution. It was abolished by the County Districts Reconstitution Act 1979, which merged it into Illawarra County Council. As of 1954, its electricity network had still not yet been connected to the statewide electricity grid. Its achievements included the construction of a hydroelectric power station on the Cochrane Dam.
