= Snowy Mountains Highway =

State highway in New South Wales, Australia

Snowy Mountains Highway New South Wales
- Snowy Mountains Highway highlighted in green

General information
- Type: Highway
- Length: 287 km (178 mi); 333 km (207 mi) including intervening roadway.
- Gazetted: August 1928 (as Main Road 4)
- Route number(s): B72 (2013–present)
- Former route number: National Route 18 (1955–2013)

Major junctions
Eastern section
- East end: Princes Highway; Stony Creek, New South Wales
- Mogilla Road
- West end: Monaro Highway; Steeple Flat, New South Wales
Western section
- East end: Monaro Highway; Cooma, New South Wales
- Kosciuszko Road; Wee Jasper Road; Gocup Road
- West end: Hume Highway; Mount Adrah, New South Wales

Location(s)
- Major settlements: Adelong, Tumut Adaminaby, Cooma

Restrictions
- General: Within Kosciuszko National Park, it is recommended that two-wheel drive vehicles carry snow chains during winter.

Highway system
- Highways in Australia; National Highway • Freeways in Australia; Highways in New South Wales

Snowy Mountains Highway is a 333-kilometre-long (207 mi) state highway located in New South Wales, Australia. Its two sections connect the New South Wales South Coast to the Monaro region, and the Monaro to the South Western Slopes via the Snowy Mountains. The higher altitude regions of this road are subject to snow over the winter months, and the road also provides access to many parts of the Snowy Mountains Scheme. The highway bears the B72 shield along its entire length.

The highway originally bore the name Monaro Highway until 1955, when it received its current name. It originally ran from Tathra to Wagga Wagga but has been shortened to run from Princes Highway to Hume Highway instead. Reservoirs created as a result of dams built in the 1950s and 1960s as part of the Snowy Mountains Scheme required the creation of major realignments to avoid submerged areas. Previous to New South Wales' conversion to alphanumeric route markers, it was signed as National Route 18.

== Route description ==
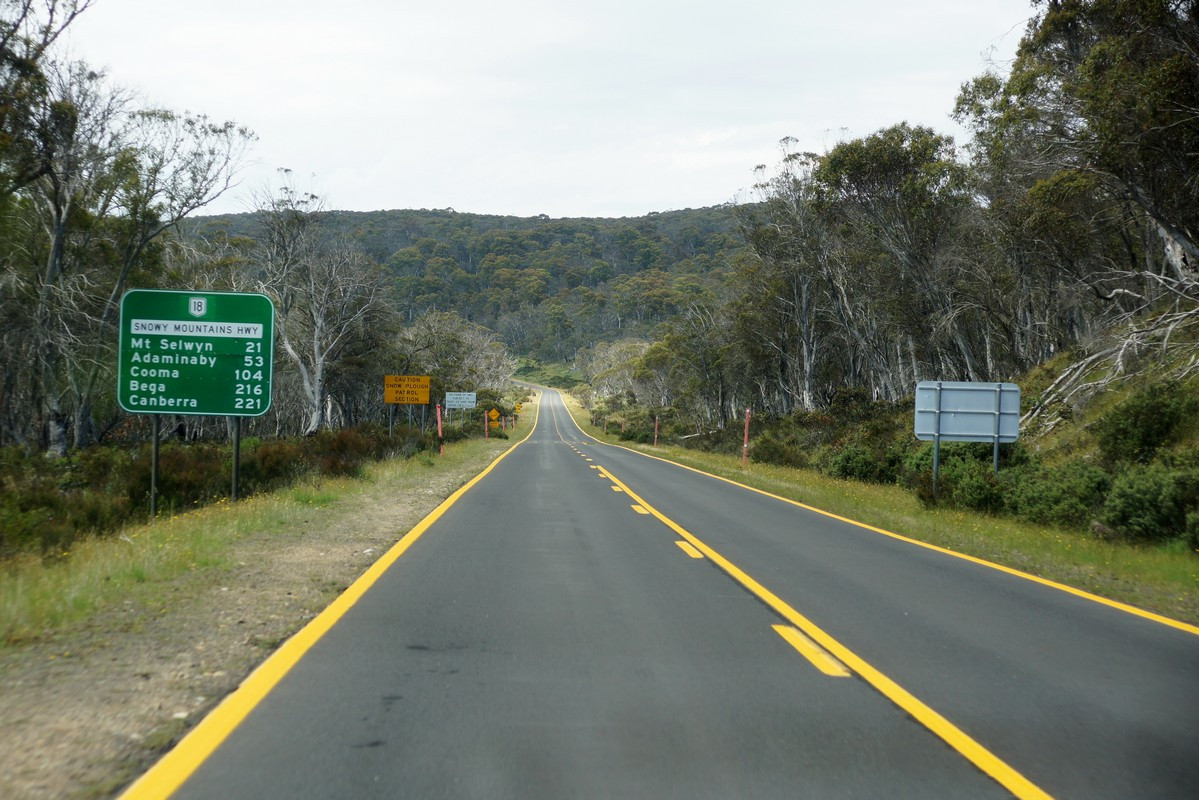
Distinctive yellow lane marking and tall red reflector posts used in high altitude sections of the highway. This image was taken within a forested section near Yarrangobilly Caves.

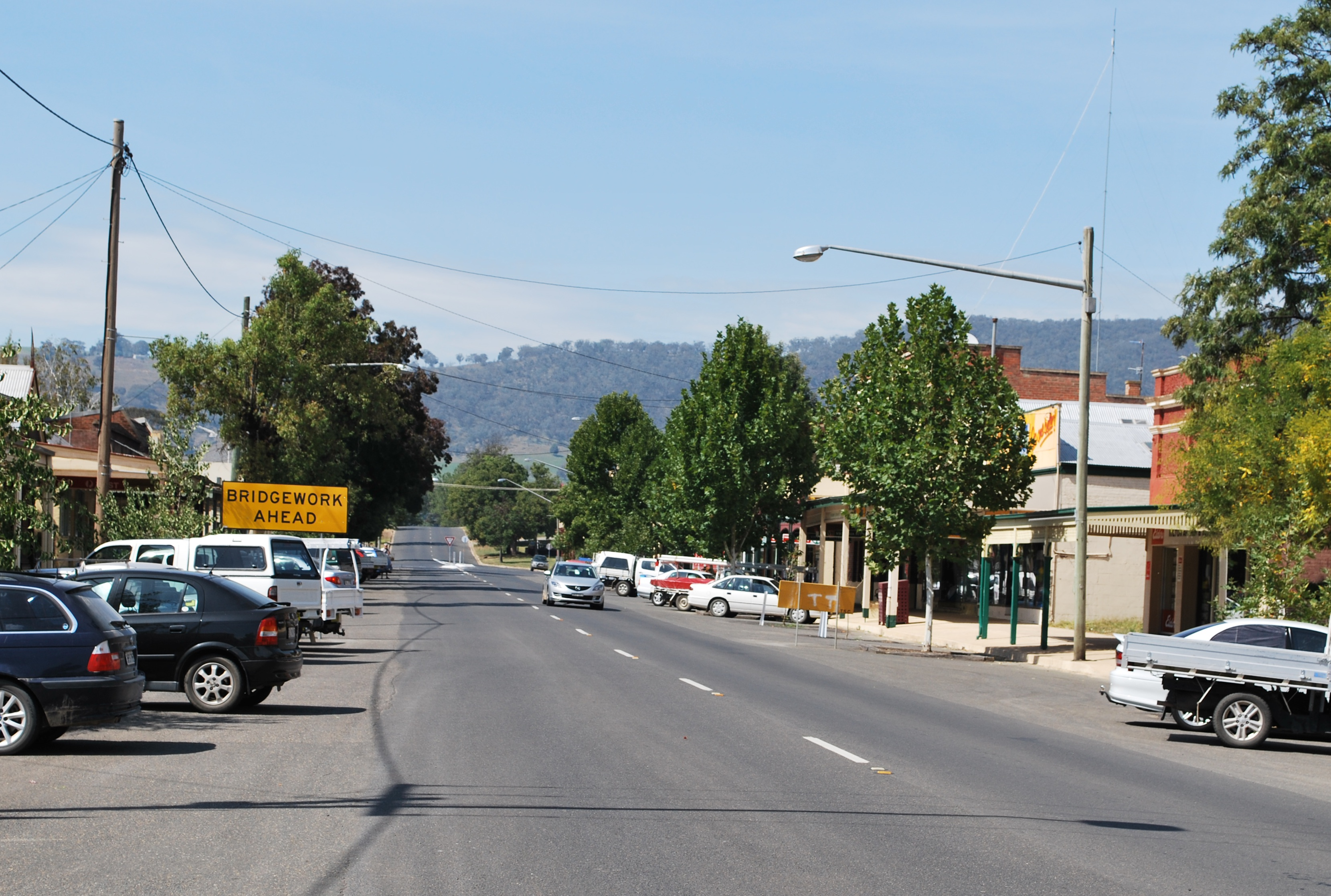
Looking east along the Snowy Mountains Highway (as Tumut Street), in Adelong.

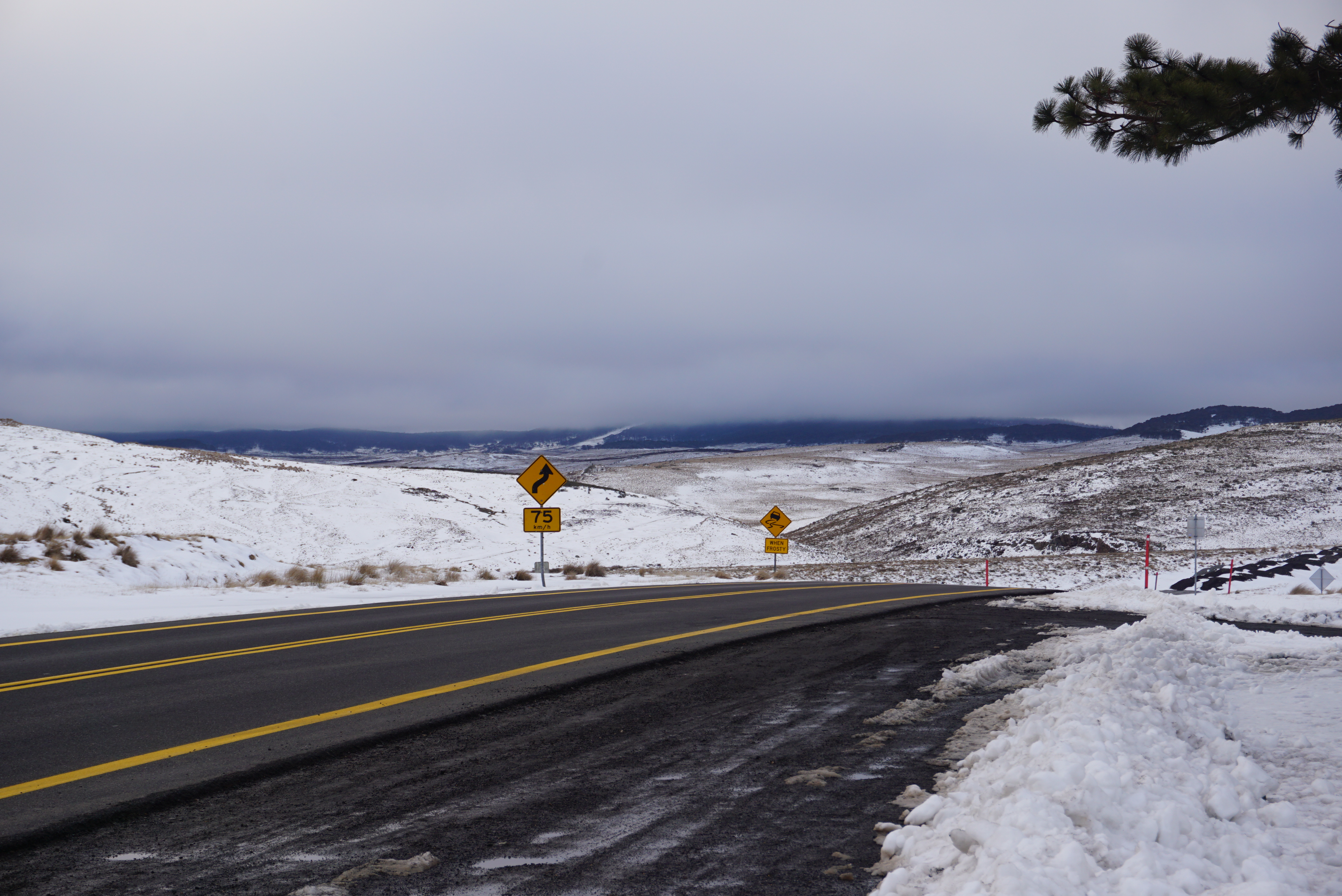
Snowy Mountains Highway passing through Kiandra

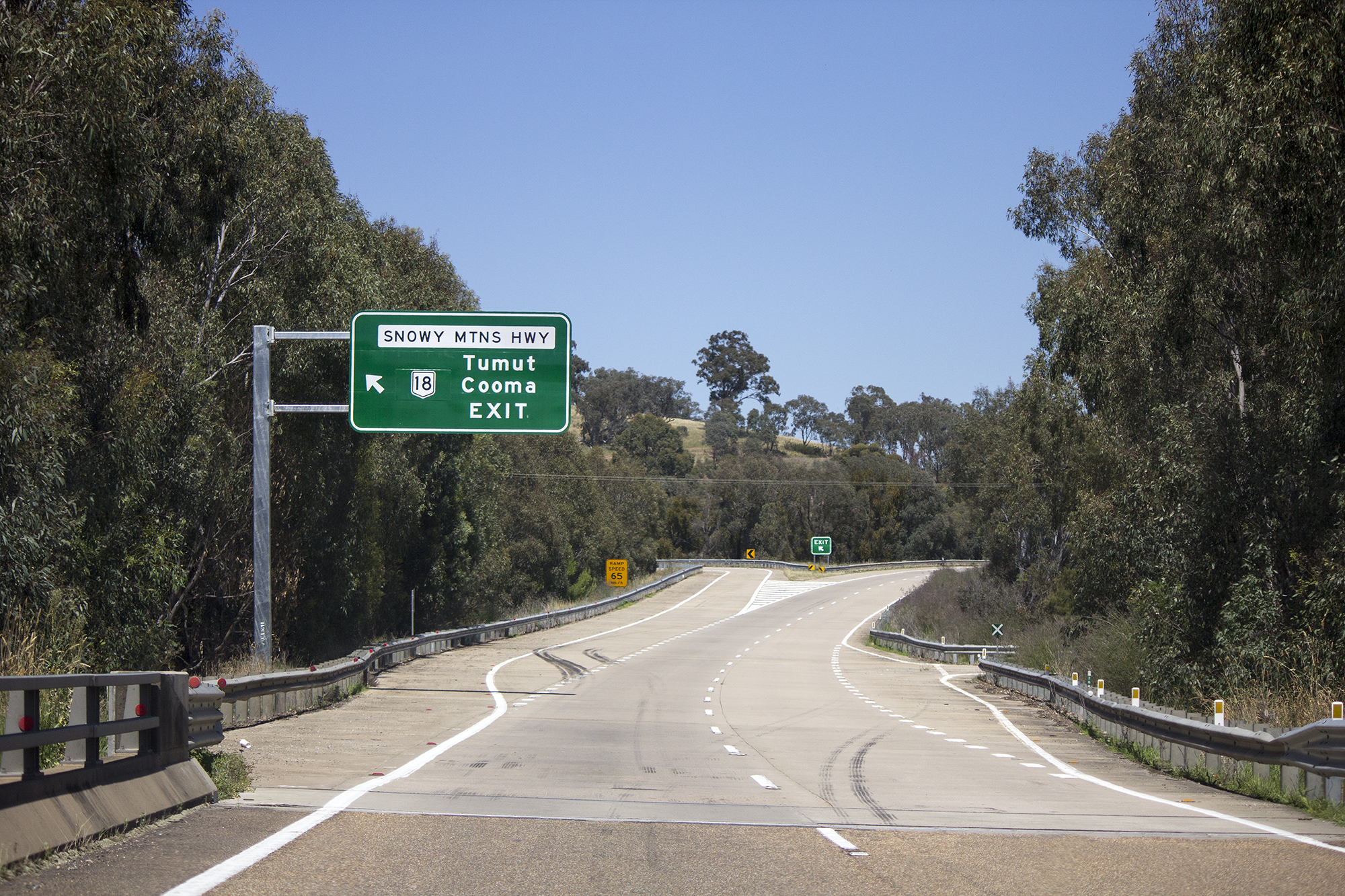
Westbound on the Hume Highway, at the western terminus of the Snowy Mountains Highway.

The eastern start point of the Snowy Mountains Highway is at its intersection with the Princes Highway at Stony Creek, about 4.5 km (2.8 mi) north of Bega. It heads roughly west through hilly terrain, the terrain smooths eventually and the road crosses the Bemboka River at Morans Crossing. A short distance further the road passes through Bemboka, taking on the name Loftus Street within the urban area. West of Bemboka the road follows the southern bank of the Bemboka River, before crossing the Nunnock River near its confluence with the Bemboka River at the base of the Great Dividing Range escarpment. Up until this point the immediate landscape surrounding the road has so far consisted of farmland. From the base of the range the road enters South East Forest National Park and follows a steep and winding alignment up the range from about 250 m (820 ft) above sea level, to over 1,100 m (3,600 ft). At the top of the range the road then enters Glenbog State Forest before once again traversing farmland for a short distance until it meets the Monaro Highway at Steeple Flat, south of Nimmitabel. This intersection is a T-intersection, through traffic continues north along Monaro Highway, while traffic heading to the south from either direction must turn. To reach the western section of Snowy Mountains Highway, Monaro Highway must be taken north towards Cooma at this point.

The western section begins at the Bombala and Sharp Street roundabout in Cooma. The highway takes on the name Sharp Street from this intersection as it heads west within Cooma urban area. Upon leaving Cooma, the road heads west via farmland to the village of Pine Valley. Here the road meets a T-intersection, with through traffic taking Kosciuszko Road southwest towards Jindabyne. The highway turns to continue on its westerly heading. The roadway then makes its way through undulating terrain for some distance before it passes through Adaminaby, and on into Kosciuszko National Park. The park boundary is marked by a sign, there are no park entry gates on the highway, and park entry fees are not payable. The road winds through mountainous terrain as it climbs towards the abandoned mining settlement of Kiandra, situated at an altitude of around 1,400 m (4,600 ft). The landscape becomes open grassland at this point and remains relatively flat as the road continues relatively gently up an alpine valley created by the Eucumbene River and its numerous tributaries. At the top of the valley the road reaches its highest point a little below 1,500 m (4,900 ft). The road then descends into part of a similar valley created by the Murrumbidgee River as it passes by the access roads for Yarrangobilly Caves. The highway then veers northwest back into forested terrain and continues along the same rough heading through hilly terrain for some distance before a mountainous descent from 900 to 400 m (3,000 to 1,300 ft), near the town of Talbingo which is located a few kilometres west of the highway. Continuing on, the roadway passes by Jounama Dam and then roughly parallels the eastern side of Blowering Reservoir (created by Blowering Dam further downstream). It then leaves the National Park descending into farmland on the Tumut Plains, roughly 300 m (980 ft) above sea level.

From here the highway then crosses the Tumut River and heads into the town of Tumut itself, taking on the names Blowering Street, Fitzroy Street, and Adelong Street within the urban area. West of Tumut the road crosses a large valley created by Gilmore Creek and Deep Creek, before a small climb through Adelong Gap into the town of Adelong, taking on the names Tumut Street, Inglis Street, and Lynch Street within the urban area. Beyond Adelong, the road continues northeast through undulating terrain before crossing Hillas Creek and then following it for the last few kilometres until the highway's western terminus at Hume Highway, located roughly halfway between Gundagai and Tarcutta.

High altitude sections subject to snow and ice have yellow lane markings and red reflector posts (which are sometimes double or triple height); in contrast to the white lines and posts generally seen elsewhere around Australia. It is recommended that snow chains are carried for all two-wheel drive vehicles travelling on this highway within Kosciuszko National Park during the winter months.

== History ==
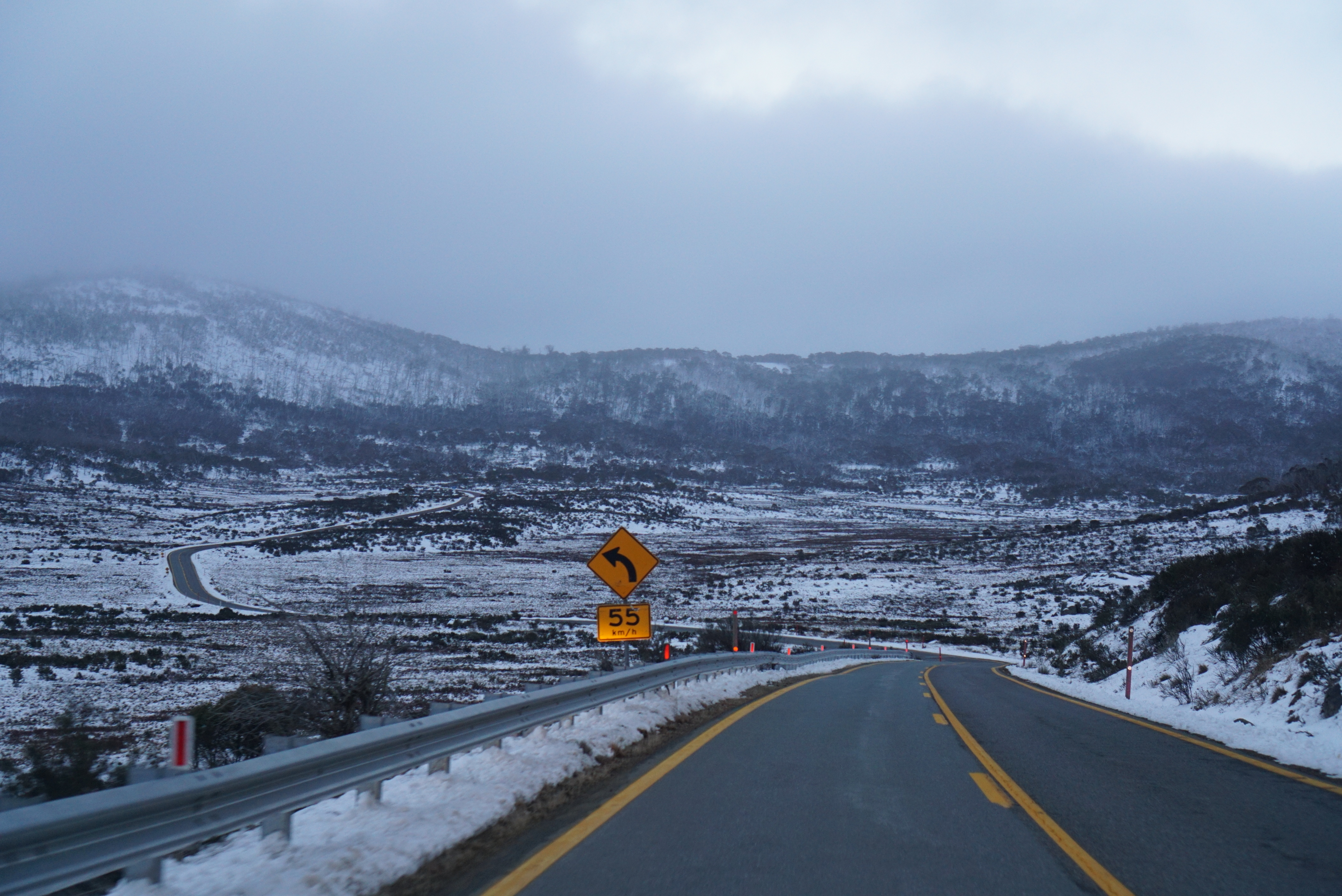
Snowy Mountains highway near Kiandra

The passing of the Main Roads Act of 1924 through the Parliament of New South Wales provided for the declaration of Main Roads, roads partially funded by the State government through the Main Roads Board (later Transport for NSW). Monaro Highway was declared (as Main Road No. 4) on 8 August 1928, heading northwest from Tathra, via Bega, Nimmitabel, Cooma, Adaminaby, Tumut, Adelong, and Lower Tarcutta to Wagga Wagga. With the passing of the Main Roads (Amendment) Act of 1929 to provide for additional declarations of State Highways and Trunk Roads, this was amended to State Highway 4 on 8 April 1929.

The Department of Main Roads, which had succeeded the MRB in the previous year, proclaimed the portion of the highway between Wagga Wagga and Hume Highway at Lower Tarcutta to be part of Sturt Highway on 8 August 1933; the highway's western end was truncated at its own junction with Hume Highway near Hillas Creek instead.

When the Snowy Mountains Scheme commenced in 1949, the road began to increase in importance. Roadworks to increase the standard of the road were undertaken, and were often paid for by the Snowy Mountains Hydro-Electric Authority. In 1955, it was decided that what was still then known as Monaro Highway would be renamed as Snowy Mountains Highway. This was done as only a relatively small portion of the road was actually within the Monaro region. The section of road between Cooma and Nimmitabel was also reclassified as part of State Highway 19, which at that time ran from Canberra, to the Victorian border west of Delegate. The various roads classified as State Highway 19, were then named as Monaro Highway in 1958. In contrast with Snowy Mountains Highway, the entire length of that highway is within the Monaro region.

Over the years further changes to the alignment have occurred. The eastern section of the highway no longer runs west to Nimmitabel, instead meeting Monaro Highway to the south; the old section has been renamed as Old Bega Road. The western section has also seen some major changes with the highway being realigned to avoid Lake Eucumbene near Adaminaby due to the construction of Eucumbene Dam in the 1950s. Similarly realignment was required to avoid the Jounama Pondage and Blowering Reservoir near Talbingo due to the construction of Jounama and Blowering Dams in the 1960s.

The passing of the Roads Act of 1993 through the Parliament of New South Wales updated road classifications and the way they could be declared within New South Wales. Under this act, the eastern end of the highway was truncated to the intersection with Princes Highway at Stony Creek north of Bega on 24 May 1996; the former section from Bega to Tathra was renamed as Tathra Road. Snowy Mountains Highway today retains its declaration as Highway 4, from the intersection with Princes Highway at Stony Creek to the intersection with Monaro Highway south of Nimmitabel, and from Cooma to the intersection with Hume Highway near Hillas Creek in Mount Adrah.

=== Route markers ===
Former National Route 18 shield (left) and current B72 route marker (right)

Route markers were first introduced in Australia in late 1954. Over the following decades they were progressively rolled out to the various highways around the nation, under a nationwide route numbering scheme, with the highway allocated National Route 18 across its entire length in 1955. In addition to this, the section of Monaro Highway between Cooma and Steeple Flat was also signed as National Route 18 in addition to the National Route 23 route marker used along the remainder of its length within NSW; this kind of arrangement is known as a duplex or concurrency. This allowed one route to cover the highway from end to end. With the conversion to the newer alphanumeric system in 2013, this was replaced with route B72. The concurrency along Monaro Highway remains intact with B72 used in addition to B23 between Cooma and Steeple Flat.

== Junction list ==
LGA	Location	km	mi	Destinations	Notes
Bega Valley	Stony Creek	0	0.0	Princes Highway (A1) – Batemans Bay, Bega	Eastern terminus of southeastern section of highway and route B72
Bemboka River		20	12	Bridge over the river (Bridge name unknown)	
Bega Valley	Bemboka	26	16	Mogilla Road – Candelo	Road also listed in schedule as "Wolumla – Bemboka Road"
Bega Valley	Bemboka	47	29	Old Bega Road – Nimmitabel	Former highway alignment
Snowy Monaro	Steeple Flat	59	37	Monaro Highway (B23/B72 north, B23 south) – Cooma, Bombala	Western terminus of southeastern section of highway, route B72 continues north along Monaro Highway; T-intersection
Gap in highway
Snowy Monaro	Cooma	105	65	Bombala Street (B23/B72 south) – Bega, Bombala; Sharp Street (B23 east) – Michelago, Canberra; Bombala Street (north) – Cooma	Eastern terminus of northwestern section of highway, route B72 continues south along Monaro Highway; Roundabout
Snowy Monaro	Pine Valley	112	70	Kosciuszko Road – Jindabyne	Westbound traffic turns northwest, eastbound traffic turns northeast
Snowy Monaro	Dargans Flat	132	82	Middlingbank Road – Berridale	
Eucumbene River		191	119	Bridge over the river (Bridge name unknown)	
Eucumbene River		202	126	Bridge over the river (Bridge name unknown)	
Snowy Valleys	Yarrangobilly	209	130	Yarrangobilly Caves Exit Road	One way road – Exit only
Snowy Valleys	Yarrangobilly	215	134	Yarrangobilly Caves Entry Road – Yarrangobilly Caves	One way road – Entry only
Tumut River		277	172	Bridge over the river (Bridge name unknown)	
Snowy Valleys	Tumut	286	178	Wee Jasper Road – Wee Jasper, Lacmalac, Tumut Airport	
Snowy Valleys	Tumut	287	178	Gocup Road (north) – Gundagai; Capper Street (south) – Tumut	
Snowy Valleys	Gilmore	294	183	Batlow Road – Batlow, Tumbarumba	
Snowy Valleys	Adelong	305	190	Tumut Street, to Wondalga Road – Wondalga	Westbound traffic turns west, eastbound traffic turns north
Snowy Valleys	Adelong	306	190	Quartz Street, to Grahamstown Road – Grahamstown, Tumblong	Westbound traffic turns south, eastbound traffic turns east
Gundagai	Mundarlo–Mount Adrah boundary	333	207	Hume Highway (M31) – Gundagai, Albury, Wagga Wagga	Partial Y-interchange, no northwestern exit northbound Western terminus of northwestern section of highway and route B72
1.000 mi = 1.609 km; 1.000 km = 0.621 mi: Incomplete access; Route transition; Total length without including gap in the highway roadway is approximately 287 km (178 mi). Listing includes: Termini, declared roads, former alignments, and intersections where a turn is required to remain on the highway, and minor roads at these intersections.

== See also ==
- Highways in Australia
- Highways in New South Wales
