= Bega River (New South Wales) =

Bega River Buckajo River, Bemboka River
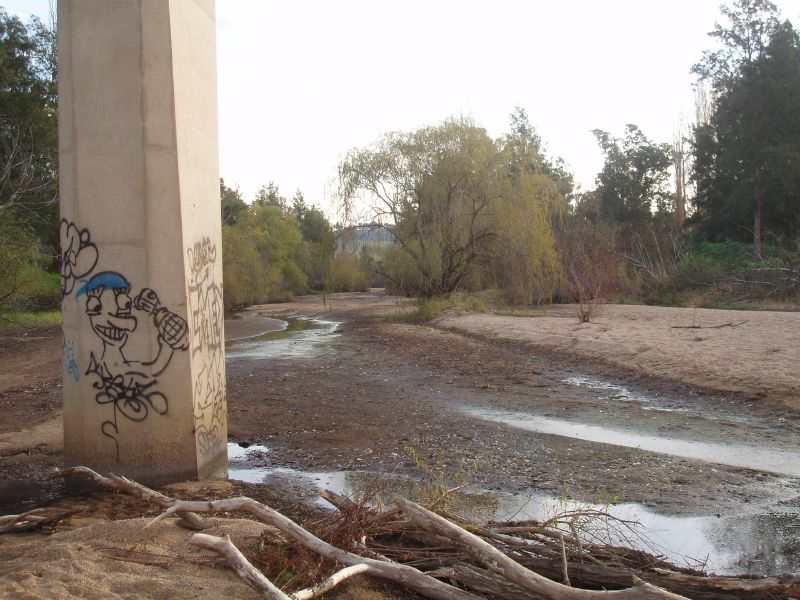
- The Bega River, facing upstream from below the Bega Bridge, 2004

Location
- Country: Australia
- State: New South Wales
- Region: South East Corner (IBRA), South Coast
- District: Bega Valley
- City: Bega

Physical characteristics
- Source confluence: Bemboka River and Tantawanglo Creek
  - location: Morans Crossing, Snowy Mountains Highway
  - coordinates: 36°40′S 149°39′E
  - elevation: 113 m (371 ft)
- Mouth: Tasman Sea, South Pacific Ocean
  - location: Mogareeka Inlet, Tathra
  - coordinates: 36°42′05″S 149°58′45″E
- Length: 48.6 km (30.2 mi)
- Basin size: 2,850 km^{2} (1,100 sq mi)

Basin features
- Tributaries
  - left: Brogo River
  - right: Sandy Creek, Wolumla Creek

The Bega River is an intermittently open intermediate wave dominated barrier estuary that is located in the South Coast region of New South Wales, Australia.

== Course ==
The Bega River rises at the confluence of the Bemboka River and Tantawanglo Creek at Morans Crossing, adjacent to the Snowy Mountains Highway. The headwaters of the river rise in the Kybeyan Range that is part of the Great Dividing Range. From Morans Crossing, the river flows generally east, then north northeast, before flowing to the northside of Bega where it meets its major tributary, the Brogo River. The Bega River then flows southeast and finally east to reach its mouth at the Tasman Sea of the South Pacific Ocean via Mogareeka Inlet, 4 kilometres (2.5 mi) north of the town of Tathra. The river descends 116 metres (381 ft) over its 48.6 kilometres (30.2 mi) course.

The Bega River is known as the Bemboka River in its upper reaches.

== See also ==
- List of rivers of Australia
- List of rivers of New South Wales (A–K)
- Rivers of New South Wales
