= Brogo River =

Coordinates: 36°40′S 149°49′E

Brogo River Broga River

Location
- Country: Australia
- State: New South Wales
- Region: South East Corner (IBRA), South Coast
- Local government area: Bega Valley
- Town: Bega

Physical characteristics
- Source: Wadbilliga Range, Great Dividing Range
  - location: Wadbilliga National Park
  - elevation: 604 m (1,982 ft)
- Mouth: confluence with the Bega River
  - location: near Bega
  - elevation: 6 m (20 ft)
- Length: 80 km (50 mi)

Basin features
- River system: Bega River
- Tributaries
  - left: Galoon Creek, Stony Creek (New South Wales)
  - right: Green Creek (New South Wales), Robinsons Creek, Yankees Creek, Nelson Creek, House Creek (New South Wales), Double Creek
- National park: Wadbilliga NP

Brogo River, a perennial river that is part of the Bega River catchment, is located in the South Coast region of New South Wales, Australia.

== Course and features ==
Brogo River rises below the Wadbilliga Range, that is part of the Great Dividing Range, within the Wadbilliga National Park, 15 kilometres (9.3 mi) west of Cobargo and flows generally southeast, joined by eight minor tributaries, before reaching its confluence with the Bega River near Bega. The river descends 600 metres (2,000 ft) over its 80 kilometres (50 mi) course.

At an elevation of 112 metres (367 ft) AHD, Brogo River is impounded by Brogo Dam to form Brogo Reservoir, a reservoir with a capacity of 8,980 megalitres (317×10^{6} cu ft), that is used for environmental flows, hydro-power generation, irrigation, and water supply.

== See also ==
- Delta Electricity
- Rivers of New South Wales
- List of rivers of New South Wales (A–K)
- List of rivers of Australia
