= Nimmitabel =

- Town
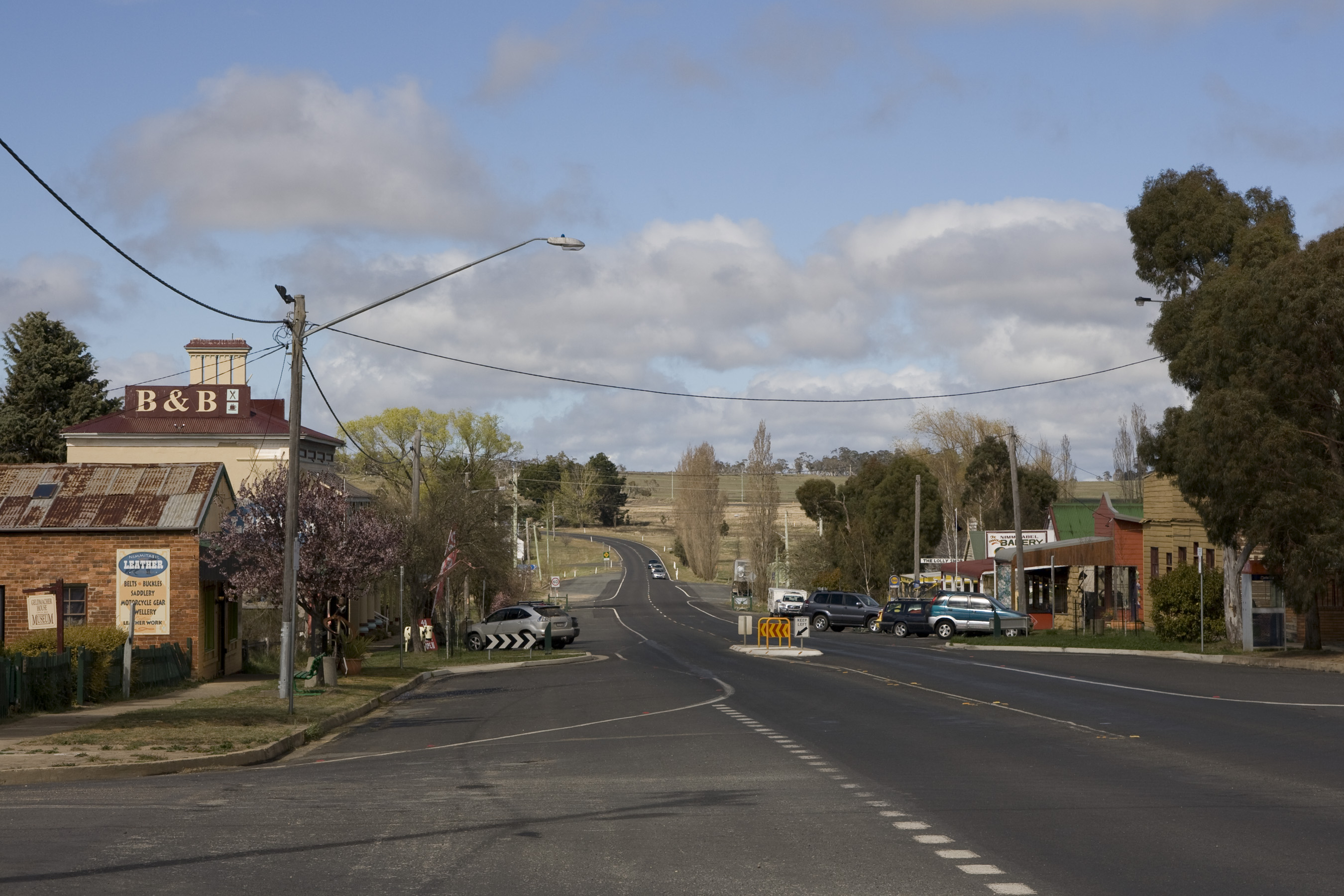
- The main street of Nimmitabel, 2010

- Coordinates: 36°30′0″S 149°17′0″E
- Country: Australia
- State: New South Wales
- LGA: Snowy Monaro Regional Council
- Location: 435 km (270 mi) SSW of Sydney; 152 km (94 mi) S of Canberra; 37 km (23 mi) SSE of Cooma; 75 km (47 mi) WNW of Bega

Government
  - State electorate: Monaro
  - Federal division: Eden-Monaro
- Elevation: 1,075 m (3,527 ft)

Population
  - Total: 324 (2021 census)
- Postcode: 2631
- Mean max temp: 15.6 °C (60.1 °F)
- Mean min temp: 3.4 °C (38.1 °F)
- Annual rainfall: 687.6 mm (27.07 in)

Nimmitabel (/ˈnɪmitəˌbɛl/ NIM-ee-tə-bel) is a small town in the Monaro region in southeast New South Wales, Australia, in the Snowy Monaro Regional Council local government area. At the 2021 census, Nimmitabel had a population of 324.

== Etymology ==
Nimmitabel means "the place where many waters start or divide" in the local Aboriginal language. Many various spellings were adopted for the town, including: Nimmytabell (1837), Nimitabelle (1838), Nimmitabool (1841), Nimmittybel (1844), Nimmitabel (1845), Nimmitybelle, Nimithybale, Nymytable (all in 1848), Nimmitabil (1851), Nimitabille and Nimithy Bell (1856), Nimaty-Bell (1857), Nimmitabel (1858)

== History ==
- 1840 Locals started calling the village Nimoitebool
- 1845 Appears on Townsend's map as Nimmitabel
- 1858 Church was built
- 1857 Renewal of licence for hotel
- 1858 Post office arrives
- 1861 Bell's Store
- 1863 Separate Courthouse built
- 1865 Geldmacher builds windmill
- 1866 Cameron's Store opens
- 1869 Nimmitabel Public School opens
- 1912 Railway arrives
- 1921 Area's first saw-mill opens
- 1959 Used as location for multi-Oscar nominated film The Sundowners
- 1986 Railway closes

== Geography ==
The town is 37 kilometres (23 mi) south of Cooma and 75 kilometres (47 mi) west of Bega. Nimmitabel is on a stretch of highway shared between the Snowy Mountains Highway (HWY B72) and the Monaro Highway (HWY B23). It is on the southern end of the Great Dividing Range, at the west of the Monaro Range, and lies 20 kilometres (12 mi) west of the Wadbilliga National Park. The area around Nimmitabel has the only true chernozem soil in Australia, a very rich, fertile and dark coloured soil.

== Climate ==
Nimmitabel has a cool oceanic climate (Köppen Cfb) with cool to mild summers and cold winters, with evenly-spread, modest rainfall throughout the year. Frosts occur regularly throughout the year, even at the height of summer. It is decently sunny, with 102.2 clear days annually, being largely on account of its leeward location.

Because of its elevation and southern latitude, several snowfalls can be expected each year from May through to October; on rare occasions, snow flurries may even occur in summer. Snow can occur heavily at times. The town has recorded sub-freezing daily maxima on multiple occasions: −0.6 °C (30.9 °F) on 13 June 1965, and shortly thereafter −1.1 °C (30.0 °F) on 17 July 1965.

Climate data for Nimmitabel Wastewater Treatment Facility (1911–1975); 1,075 m AMSL; 36.51° S, 149.28° E
Month	Jan	Feb	Mar	Apr	May	Jun	Jul	Aug	Sep	Oct	Nov	Dec	Year
Record high °C (°F)	37.2 (99.0)	38.3 (100.9)	31.7 (89.1)	25.6 (78.1)	23.9 (75.0)	17.2 (63.0)	14.5 (58.1)	18.7 (65.7)	25.6 (78.1)	26.1 (79.0)	31.1 (88.0)	34.4 (93.9)	38.3 (100.9)
Mean daily maximum °C (°F)	22.8 (73.0)	22.6 (72.7)	20.2 (68.4)	15.7 (60.3)	11.6 (52.9)	8.3 (46.9)	7.7 (45.9)	9.4 (48.9)	12.8 (55.0)	16.0 (60.8)	18.6 (65.5)	21.6 (70.9)	15.6 (60.1)
Mean daily minimum °C (°F)	8.5 (47.3)	8.9 (48.0)	6.7 (44.1)	3.6 (38.5)	0.9 (33.6)	−1.2 (29.8)	−1.9 (28.6)	−1.3 (29.7)	0.7 (33.3)	3.1 (37.6)	5.2 (41.4)	7.4 (45.3)	3.4 (38.1)
Record low °C (°F)	−1.1 (30.0)	−1.1 (30.0)	−2.1 (28.2)	−3.3 (26.1)	−7.2 (19.0)	−8.7 (16.3)	−9.9 (14.2)	−10.5 (13.1)	−8.7 (16.3)	−6.6 (20.1)	−3.9 (25.0)	−2.2 (28.0)	−10.5 (13.1)
Average precipitation mm (inches)	69.1 (2.72)	59.4 (2.34)	60.9 (2.40)	47.9 (1.89)	51.9 (2.04)	65.4 (2.57)	49.4 (1.94)	45.4 (1.79)	48.4 (1.91)	59.4 (2.34)	62.4 (2.46)	68.0 (2.68)	687.6 (27.08)
Average precipitation days (≥ 0.2 mm)	7.6	7.5	7.9	7.6	8.6	9.8	9.0	9.0	9.4	9.5	9.0	8.6	103.5
Source: Australian Bureau of Meteorology; Nimmitabel Wastewater Treatment Facility

== Popular culture ==
The village was featured on episode 23 of the tenth series of the ABC TV program Back Roads aired on 22 October 2024.

== Gallery ==
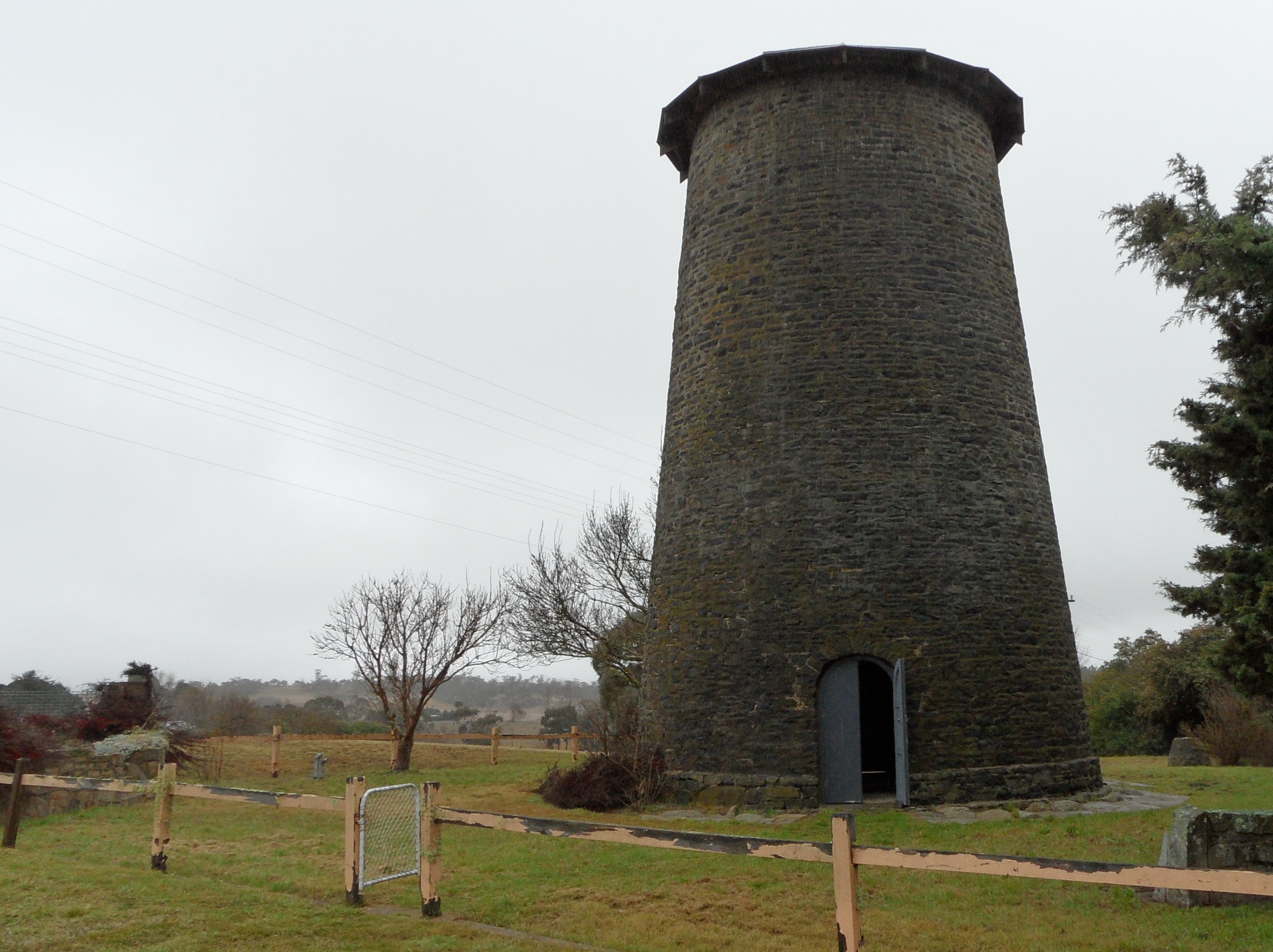
Geldmacher's windmill tower at Nimmitabel

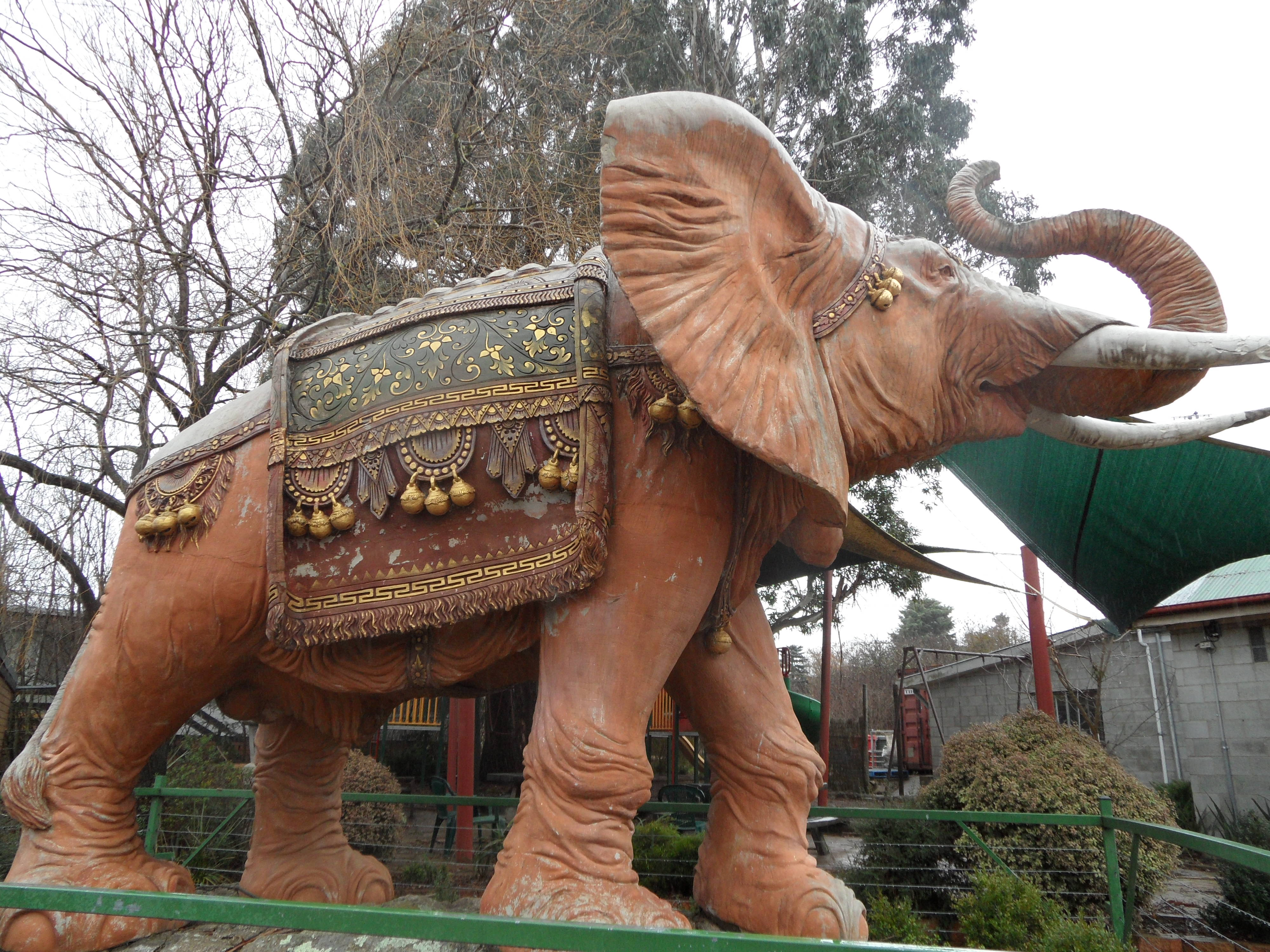
The concrete elephant “George” at the Nimmitabel Bakery

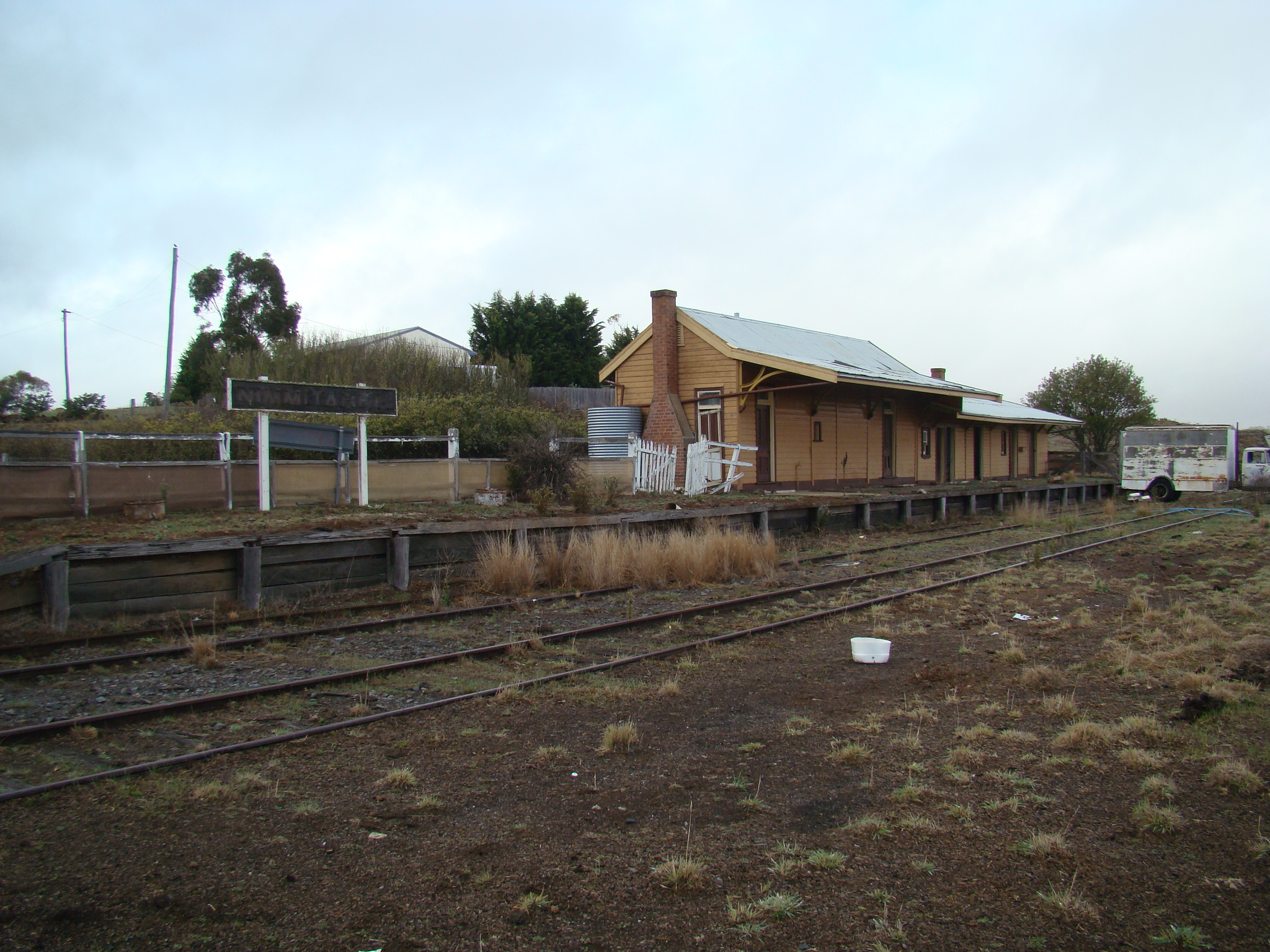
Nimmitabel railway station 21 years after the last train
