= Quaama, New South Wales =

Quaama
- Town
- Coordinates: 36°27′53″S 149°52′08″E
- Country: Australia
- State: New South Wales
- LGA: Bega Valley Shire

Government
  - State electorate: Bega
  - Federal division: Eden-Monaro
- Elevation: 163 m (535 ft)

Population
  - Total: 281 (2016 census)
- Postcode: 2550

Quaama is a village in the Bega Valley Shire, in the South Coast region of New South Wales, Australia. The village is located along the Princes Highway between Cobargo and Brogo, 30 km north of the town of Bega. It had a resident population of 281 at the 2016 Census.

The village was formerly known as Dry River (a name linked to the nearby Dry River) until the early 1900s, and was later known as "Quaamaa"; the present spelling was assigned in 1999. Many of Quaama's important community buildings have a long history: the Quaama Public School was founded in 1877, the School of Arts was established in 1902, and the local Anglican church celebrated its centenary in 2007. Quaama also has a general store with a post office, and a bushfire brigade.

It is also the hometown of Australian international netball player Susan Pratley.

== Bushfires ==
On the 30th of December, 2019, the infamous 2019-2020 bushfires ripped through Quaama. The efforts of the Quaama Volunteer Bushfire Brigade helped saved many buildings, including the Public School, General Store, & School of Arts, but dozens of houses were lost, as well as the playground and Anglican Church.
