= Cobargo, New South Wales =

Cobargo
- Town
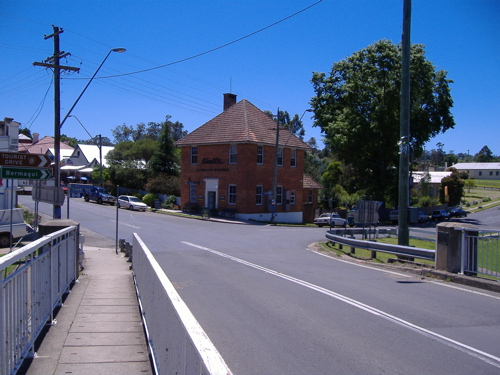
- View of Cobargo from the Princes Highway bridge

- Coordinates: 36°22′S 149°54′E
- Country: Australia
- State: New South Wales
- LGA: Bega Valley Shire
- Location: 383 km (238 mi) S of Sydney; 42 km (26 mi) SW of Narooma; 41 km (25 mi) N of Bega; 21 km (13 mi) W of Bermagui; 252 km (157 mi) SE of Canberra

Government
  - State electorate: Bega
  - Federal division: Eden-Monaro
- Elevation: 81 m (266 ft)

Population
  - Total: 776 (2016 census)
- Postcode: 2550
Localities around Cobargo
Wandella	Dignams Creek	Tilba
Yowrie	Cobargo	Coolagolite
Verona	Brogo	Quaama

Cobargo is a village in the south-east area of the state of New South Wales in Australia in Bega Valley Shire. At the 2016 census, Cobargo had a population of 776 people. It is 386 km south of Sydney on the Princes Highway between Narooma and Bega. The town suffered heavy losses during the 2019-20 bushfires.

Cobargo's streetscape features turn of the century buildings. It has developed in the early 21st century from a sleepy and small village into a popular tourist destination. Its attractions include olden-style stores, leather craftworks, potteries, an iron forge, art galleries, tea rooms and antique shops. Wadbilliga National Park is 20 km west of Cobargo.

The name Cobargo may have originated from the local Indigenous Australian word 'cubago' which some sources claim was used to describe nearby Mount Gulaga.

== History ==
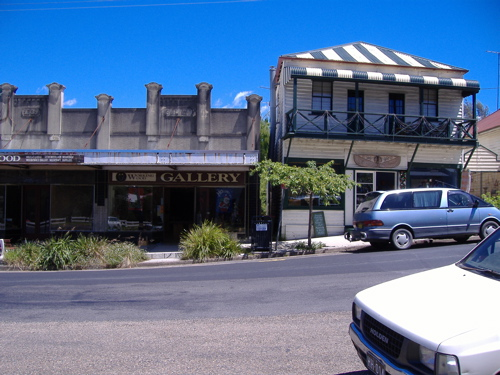
Art and craft galleries line the main street displaying locally produced works of pottery, leather and wood

The area now known as Cobargo lies on the traditional lands of Yuin people.

The area was settled in the late 1820s when graziers moved stock into the district. William Duggan Tarlinton was the first white man to set foot in the district in 1829, seeking pasture for his cattle. He returned in the 1830s, erecting slab and bark huts in the district and became one of its prominent citizens. By the late 1830s the three Imlay brothers had substantial holdings and around 1840 Alexander Imlay, one of the Imlay brothers, named his property Cobargo.

Cobargo was known as 'The Junction' in the late 1860s as it was located at the junction of the Narira and Bredbatoura Creeks. A school opened in 1871 and by that year the village had a post office, store, hotel, church and blacksmith shops. Development gained pace following the construction of a bridge over the Narira Creek in 1882 and improvement of the coast road in the 1880s. By the 1890s the town was large enough to sustain a local newspaper, the Cobargo Watch. A butter factory was established in 1901 and continued butter production until 1980. In 1903 a branch of the Bank of New South Wales was opened. The office built in 1917 on the corner of Bermagui Road operated until 1997.

The town was in decline for much of the twentieth century as transportation has made the larger centres more accessible, however like other nearby villages it has recently been revitalised as a tourist destination.

The main street of the town was devastated by bushfire on 31 December 2019, with significant loss of buildings and life. Four people, including a father and son, were killed. Prime Minister Scott Morrison toured the town several days later, but was heckled by inflamed residents after forcing a handshake upon a local Cobargo woman.

== Location ==
Cobargo is on the Princes Highway 42 km north of Bega, the closest regional centre, and is 19.4 km from the coast at Bermagui. It serves as the local village for the nearby localities of Coolagolite, Wandella, Yowrie and Dignam's Creek. It is 386 km south of Sydney.

== Literary references ==
Writer Olga Masters based her collection of short stories A Long Time Dying on people and events in pre-war Cobargo. Olga Masters started her journalistic career on the Cobargo Chronicle at the age of 15 in 1934.

== Population ==
In the 2016 Census, there were 776 people in Cobargo. 77.2% of people were born in Australia and 89.1% of people spoke only English at home. The most common responses for religion in Cobargo were no religion (36.5%) and Anglican (21.2%).

== Events ==
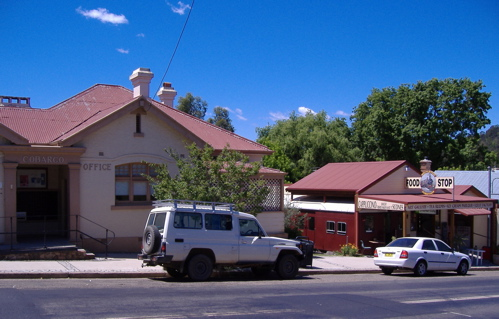
The post office and "The Train" restaurant

- Cobargo hosts a country market each Saturday in the main street.
- An annual show boasting local stock, produce and crafts in early February since the late 1800s
- An annual folk music festival is held there in the first weekend of March.
