= Bemboka =

- Town
- Coordinates: 36°38′0″S 149°35′0″E
- Country: Australia
- State: New South Wales
- LGA: Bega Valley Shire
- Location: 474 km (295 mi) SSW of Sydney; 193 km (120 mi) S of Canberra; 36 km (22 mi) W of Bega; 77 km (48 mi) SE of Cooma

Government
  - State electorate: Bega
  - Federal division: Eden-Monaro

Population
  - Total: 589 (2021 census)
- Postcode: 2550

Bemboka is a town in the South Coast region of New South Wales, Australia. The town is located on the Snowy Mountains Highway, in the Bega Valley Shire local government area, 474 kilometres (295 miles) south of the state capital, Sydney. At the 2021 census, the Bemboka gazetted locality had a population of 589.

== Geography ==
The Aboriginal meaning of the name Bemboka (originally Benbooka) is thought to be "High Peak". Positioned at the eastern (western?) head of the Bega Valley, 25 kilometres (15 miles) from the base of Brown Mountain (1241m), a spur of the Great Dividing Range, the locality is bordered by the mountains and ridges of the South East Forests National Park. Prominent features in the Bemboka section to the north include Indian Head, Pigeon Box, Bemboka Peak and Numbugga Walls.

== History ==
The first inhabitants of the region were a sub-group of the Thaua people of the Yuin nation. The first European settlers were squatters grazing sheep and cattle on crown land beyond the limits of location set by the NSW Government in 1829. The first purchases of land by selectors occurred in 1862 and the first school was established on Brown Mountain in 1871. Settlement occurred in two adjacent villages – Colombo and the private subdivision of Lyttleton. The two towns remained relatively isolated until the bridle trail on Brown Mountain used to carry post was upgraded in 1889 to take vehicles, providing an effective means of descent from the Monaro to the coastal plain. Colombo was regazetted as Bemboka in 1894, and Lyttleton was incorporated into the village in 1923. From 1904 to 1911, the town had its own weekly newspaper, the Bemboka Advocate. It was also the location of the former Mumbulla Shire administration offices from 1906 until the Bega Valley Shire was formed in 1981.

== Population ==
In the 2016 Census, there were 577 people in Bemboka. 81.5% of people were born in Australia and 89.9% of people only spoke English at home, The most common responses for religion were No Religion 36.2%, Catholic 18.1% and Anglican 17.4%.

== Economy ==
The town economy is based on dairying. In the late 1890s there were six known butter and cheese factories in the area. These were superseded by cooperatives, with the Bemboka Co-operative Factory at the east end of town remaining in business until 1980. During the 1980s and 1990s, the old cheese factory building was used by Bemboka Handmade Paper Pty Ltd to make quality handmade paper that was marketed worldwide.

Bemboka is notable for retaining most of its older timber buildings. These include the stores which once lined the main street, some of which are now used as private homes. The original Bemboka Pie Shop built in 1930 still operates as a bakery and pie shop with a reputation built from a long history of providing refreshment to motorists coming down to the coast from the Monaro and ACT.

In the surrounding state forests, woodchopping and logging was a major industry until the late 1980s, when activism by conservationists resulted in the reservation of 15,300 hectares as Bemboka National Park. In 1997, this area was merged into the South East Forests National Park.

== Community ==
For a small community, the people of Bemboka have a history of working together to achieve big things. From 1956–1967, the village ran its own weekly picture show in the School of Arts Hall using the school's 16 millimetre projector, to raise money to build the current Bemboka Memorial Hall. During the 1970s, the village raised funds through housie nights, catering and grants to build a swimming pool in the town. Most recently, Bemboka has become known for its banquet, a community initiative of the Bemboka Show Society, which in 2012 served 150 guests a four course dinner of five entrees, five main courses, five desserts and five cheeses, with 90 per cent of ingredients sourced from within 10 kilometres of the Bemboka Memorial Hall. The GlobalDoodle project was headquartered in Bemboka.
