= List of fires and impacts of the 2019–20 Australian bushfire season =

The following tables show the extent of impact of the 2019–20 Australian bushfire season.

== List of fires of the 2019–20 Australian bushfire season ==
Fire	State	Local Government Area(s)	Start date	Contained / Cease Date	Area impacted	Comments
Adaminaby Complex	New South Wales	Snowy Monaro Regional Council	31/12/2019	Out on 16/02/2020	98,485 hectares (as of 15 February 2020)	Ignited by several lightning strikes
Anderson's Creek	New South Wales	Bellingen Shire Council Nambucca Valley Council	November 26 2019		1506 hectares (as of 05/12/19)	Ignited by lightning strike in New England National Park
Badja Forest Rd	New South Wales	Snowy Monaro Regional Council Eurobodalla Shire Bega Valley Shire			315,512 hectares (as of 15 February 2020)	Joined with the Good Good fire and the Werri Berri fire
Bees Nest	New South Wales	Armidale Regional Council Clarence Valley Council	August 31, 2019		100 000+ hectares	Earliest mega-fire of the Black Summer (beginning in the winter of 2019)
Big Jack Mountain	New South Wales	Bega Valley Shire			19,633 hectares (as of 15 February 2020)	
Bondi	New South Wales	Snowy Monaro Regional Council			3,539 hectares (as of 15 February 2020)	
Border Fire	New South Wales	Bega Valley Shire			192,489 hectares (as of 15 February 2020)	
Border Trail Fire	New South Wales	Kyogle Council Tenterfield Shire Council	early November 2019		At least 6,400 hectares	
Buldah	Victoria					
Busby's Flat Road	New South Wales	Richmond Valley Council				
Calabash	New South Wales	Snowy Monaro Regional Council			4,634 hectares (as of 15 February 2020)	
Campbells River Rd	New South Wales	Oberon Council			481 hectares (as of 15 February 2020)	
Carrai East	New South Wales	Kempsey Shire				
Clear Range	New South Wales	Snowy Monaro Regional Council			12,458 hectares (as of 15 February 2020)	
Clyde Mountain	New South Wales	Eurobodalla Shire	29 December 2019	Out 16 February 2020	98,816 hectares (as of 15 February 2020)	Grew from Currowan fire Over 400 homes destroyed
Coombes Gap Complex	New South Wales	Port Macquarie-Hastings Council			37,772 hectares (as of 19 January 2020)	
Creewah Rd	New South Wales	Snowy Monaro Regional Council			9,314 hectares (as of 15 February 2020)	
Currowan	New South Wales	City of Shoalhaven	26 November 2019	Out 8 February 2020	499,621 hectares (as of 8 February 2020)	Ignited by lightning strike 312 homes destroyed, 173 damaged and 1,889 saved.
Crestwood Drive	New South Wales	Port Macquarie-Hastings Council			3,572 hectares (as of 19 January 2020)	
Cuddlee Creek	South Australia	Adelaide Hills Council	20 December 2019	Declared safe 3 January 2020	23,295 hectares	Ignited by power infrastructure 85 homes destroyed, 1 death 51 firefighters injured
Dunns Road	New South Wales	Snowy Valleys Council City of Wagga Wagga	28 December 2019	Contained 2 February 2020 Out 15 February 2020	333,940 hectares (as of 15 February 2020)	Ignited by lightning strike 182 homes destroyed
East Rd	New South Wales	Murray River Council			5 hectares (as of 15 February 2020)	
Forest Road, Comberton	New South Wales	City of Shoalhaven			2,686 hectares	
French Island	Victoria		15 January 2020	Contained 20 January 2020	87 hectares	Believed to be ignited by lightning strike
Gospers Mountain	New South Wales	City of Hawkesbury	26 October 2019	Contained 13 January 2020 Out 7 February 2020	512,626 hectares	Ignited by lightning strike
Good Good	New South Wales	Snowy Monaro Regional Council			42,563 hectares (as of 15 February 2020)	
Green Valley	New South Wales	Greater Hume Shire	29 December 2019	Out 18 February 2020	208,275 hectares (as of 15 February 2020)	Ignited by lightning strike 7 related deaths including John Smith, Ross Rixon, Robert and Patrick Salway, Collin Burns, Michael Clarke and Richard Steele.
Green Wattle Creek	New South Wales	Wollondilly Shire		Out 7 February 2020	278,405 hectares (as of 19 January 2020)	Ignited by lightning strike
Jinden	New South Wales	Queanbeyan–Palerang Regional Council			17,684 hectares (as of 15 February 2020)	
Kangaroo Island Complex	South Australia	Kangaroo Island Council	20 December 2019		210,000 hectares (as of 14 January 2020)	Believed to be ignited by lightning strike 2 deaths
Kerry Ridge	New South Wales	Muswellbrook Shire Singleton Council Mid-Western Regional Council		Out 7 February 2020	156,000 hectares (as of 19 January 2020)	
Kian Road	New South Wales	Nambucca Valley Council	Late October 2019		31,000 hectares	Started by lightning strike At least 60 homes lost, 1 dead
Kydra Complex	New South Wales	Snowy Monaro Regional Council			8,766 hectares (as of 15 February 2020)	
Liberation Trail	New South Wales	Clarence Valley Council City of Coffs Harbour	early November 2019		148, 000 hectares	169 homes destroyed including 85 homes in the town of Nymboida on 8th November 2019
Lindfield Park Road	New South Wales	Port Macquarie-Hastings Council	18 July 2019	Out 12 February 2020	858 hectares (as of 12 February 2020)	
Little L Complex	New South Wales	Singleton Council			171,396 hectares (as of 19 January 2020)	
Long Gully Road	New South Wales	Tenterfield Shire Clarence Valley Council	5 September 2019	Out 27 October 2019	74,000 hectares	Ignited by lightning strike 2 deaths 40 homes destroyed, 22 damaged, 300 saved
Macalister 43	Victoria					37.0696°S 147.08774°E
Meads Creek West	New South Wales					
Mount Nardi	New South Wales	City of Lismore	8 November 2019			Source of ignition unknown Rainforest fires Site of a significant grass-roots community effort to support agencies undertaking containment, known as "the community defenders"
Mt Royal	New South Wales	Dungog, New South Wales			9,250 hectares (as of 19 January 2020)	
Myall Creek Road	New South Wales	Richmond Valley Council		Out 7 February 2020	121,324 hectares (as of 19 January 2020)	
Myrtle Mountain Road	New South Wales	Bega Valley Shire	30 December 2019			
Orroral Valley	Australian Capital Territory		27 January 2020	Contained 10 February 2020	86,562 hectares (as of 15 February 2020)	Ignited by landing light on army helicopter in Namadgi National Park
Ovens 41	Victoria					
Pearson Trail Complex	New South Wales				23,053 hectares (as of 19 January 2020)	
Pilot Lookout	New South Wales	Snowy Valleys Council			14,400 hectares (as of 19 January 2020)	
Postmans Trail	New South Wales	Bega Valley Shire			12,285 hectares (as of 15 February 2020)	
Rockton	New South Wales	Snowy Monaro Regional Council			26,295 hectares (as of 15 February 2020)	
Rolling Ground	New South Wales	Snowy Valleys Council			5,688 hectares (as of 15 February 2020)	
Rumba Complex	New South Wales	Mid-Coast Council			153,167 hectares (as of 19 January 2020)	
Scabby Range	New South Wales	Snowy Monaro Regional Council			3,874 hectares (as of 15 February 2020)	
Snowy Complex	Victoria					
Tambo 35	Victoria					
Tambo 64	Victoria					
Tambo 48	Victoria					
Upper Turon Rd	New South Wales	Mid-Western Regional Council			17,414 hectares (as of 19 January 2020)	
Upper Murray	Victoria		29 December 2019		308,242 hectares (as of 17 January 2020)	Also known as the Green Valley (NSW) or Walwa fire
Utakarra	Western Australia	City of Greater Geraldton				
Waterhole Rd	New South Wales	Murray River Council			2 hectares (as of 15 February 2020)	
Werri Berri	New South Wales				26,700 hectares (as of 19 January 2020)	Merged with Badja Forest Road Fire

== Impact to towns of the 2019–20 Australian bushfire season ==
Town/locality	Local government area	State	Impacted Dates	Impact	Coords
Araluen	Queanbeyan-Palerang Regional Council	New South Wales			
Ashby Heights	Clarence Valley Council	New South Wales			
Balmoral	Wingecarribee Shire Council	New South Wales			
Bargo	Wollondilly Shire	New South Wales			
Barringella	City of Shoalhaven	New South Wales			
Batehaven	Eurobodalla Shire	New South Wales			35°44′S 150°12′E
Batlow	Snowy Valleys Council	New South Wales	4 January 2020	17 houses destroyed	35°31′0″S 148°09′0″E
Bell	City of Blue Mountains	New South Wales			
Bellangry	Port Macquarie-Hastings Council	New South Wales			
Bellbrook	Kempsey Shire	New South Wales			30°49′00″S 152°30′00″E
Belowra	Eurobodalla Shire	New South Wales			
Bemboka	Bega Valley Shire Council	New South Wales			36°38′0″S 149°35′0″E
Benandarah	Eurobodalla Shire	New South Wales			
Bendalong	City of Shoalhaven	New South Wales			
Berambing	City of Hawkesbury	New South Wales			33°32′00″S 150°26′38″E
Bilpin	City of Hawkesbury	New South Wales	19 December 2019		33°29′53″S 150°31′19″E
Bimbimbie	Eurobodalla Shire	New South Wales			
Birdwood	Port Macquarie-Hastings Council	New South Wales			
Blaxlands Creek	Clarence Valley Council	New South Wales			
Bobin	Mid-Coast Council	New South Wales			31°43′34″S 152°17′02″E
Bombay	Queanbeyan-Palerang Regional Council	New South Wales			
Boolijah	City of Shoalhaven	New South Wales			
Boorganna	Port Macquarie-Hastings Council	New South Wales			
Bora Ridge	Richmond Valley Council	New South Wales			
Bowenfels	City of Lithgow	New South Wales			33°31′S 150°07′E
Boydtown	Bega Valley Shire Council	New South Wales			37°06′S 149°53′E
Brogo	Bega Valley Shire Council	New South Wales			
Broulee	Eurobodalla Shire	New South Wales	31 December 2019		35°51′26″S 150°10′44″E
Buangla	City of Shoalhaven	New South Wales			
Buckenbowra	Eurobodalla Shire	New South Wales			
Buccarumbi	Clarence Valley Council	New South Wales			
Budgong	City of Shoalhaven	New South Wales			
Bulga Forest	Mid-Coast Council	New South Wales			
Bullio	Wingecarribee Shire	New South Wales			
Bumbalong	Snowy Monaro Regional Council	New South Wales	1 February 2020		
Bundamba	Ipswich City Council	Queensland	6 December 2019 7 December 2019		27°36′S 152°49′E
Bundanoon	Wingecarribee Shire	New South Wales			
Bundoora		Victoria	30 December 2019		37.695°S 145.064°E
Bungawalbin	Richmond Valley Council	New South Wales			
Buxton	Blue Mountain National Park	New South Wales			
Buxton	Wingecarribee Shire	New South Wales			
Cabramurra	Snowy Valleys Council	New South Wales	4 January 2020	39 homes destroyed	35°55′59″S 148°22′59″E
Cadgee	Eurobodalla Shire	New South Wales			
Caffreys Flat	Mid-Coast Council	New South Wales			
Camira	Richmond Valley Council	New South Wales			
Caparra	Mid-Coast Council	New South Wales			
Carrai	Armidale Regional Council	New South Wales			
Catalina	Eurobodalla Shire	New South Wales			
Chambigne	Clarence Valley Council	New South Wales			
Clarence	City of Lithgow	New South Wales			
Clouds Creek	Clarence Valley Council	New South Wales			
Cobar Park	City of Lithgow	New South Wales			
Cobargo	Bega Valley Shire Council	New South Wales	31 December 2019	22 structures destroyed, 2 deaths	36°22′S 149°54′E
Colinton	Snowy Monaro Regional Council	New South Wales	1 February 2020		
Colo Heights	City of Hawkesbury	New South Wales			33°22′08″S 150°43′19″E
Congarinni North	Nambucca Shire Council	New South Wales			
Conjola	City of Shoalhaven	New South Wales			
Conjola Park	City of Shoalhaven	New South Wales			
Coolagolite	Bega Valley Shire Council	New South Wales			
Coolumburra	City of Shoalhaven	New South Wales			
Corang	Queanbeyan-Palerang Regional Council	New South Wales			
Courabyra	Snowy Valleys Council	New South Wales		2 homes destroyed	
Currowan	City of Shoalhaven	New South Wales			
Currowan	Eurobodalla Shire	New South Wales			
Dargan	City of Lithgow	New South Wales			
Darlow	Snowy Valleys Council	New South Wales			
Debenham	Port Macquarie-Hastings Council	New South Wales			
Deep Creek	Kempsey Shire	New South Wales			
Deua River Valley	Eurobodalla Shire	New South Wales			35°46′25″S 149°56′32″E
Diehard	Glen Innes Southern Shire Council	New South Wales			
Doyalson	Central Coast Council	New South Wales			33°11′56″S 151°31′5″E
Dumaresq Valley	Tenterfield Shire	New South Wales			
Dyers Crossing	Mid-Coast Council	New South Wales			
Ebor	Armidale Regional Council	New South Wales			30°24′S 152°21′E
East Lynne	City of Shoalhaven	New South Wales			
Ellenborough	Port Macquarie-Hastings Council	New South Wales			
Emmaville	Glen Innes Southern Shire Council	New South Wales			29°27′S 151°36′E
Eurobodalla	Eurobodalla Shire	New South Wales			
Exeter	Wingecarribee Shire	New South Wales			
Fishermans Paradise	City of Shoalhaven	New South Wales			
Forbes River	Port Macquarie-Hastings Council	New South Wales			
Gibberagee	Richmond Valley Council	New South Wales			
Gilmore	Snowy Valleys Council	New South Wales			
Glenreagh	Clarence Valley Council	New South Wales			30°03′S 152°59′E
Glenthorne	Mid-Coast Council	New South Wales			
Goodmans Ford	Wingecarribee Shire	New South Wales			
Hill Top	Wingecarribee Shire	New South Wales			
Hillville	Mid-Coast Council	New South Wales			
Illaroo	City of Shoalhaven	New South Wales			
Jacky Bulbin Flat	Clarence Valley Council	New South Wales			
Jeogla	Armidale Regional Council	New South Wales			30°34′00″S 152°07′00″E
Jerrawangala	City of Shoalhaven	New South Wales			
Jeremadra	Eurobodalla Shire	New South Wales			
Johns River	Mid-Coast Council	New South Wales			31.7303°S 152.6984°E
Kangaroo Creek	Clarence Valley Council	New South Wales			
Kangaroo Valley	City of Shoalhaven	New South Wales			
Kiah	Bega Valley Shire Council	New South Wales			
Killabakh	Mid-Coast Council	New South Wales			
Kippaxs	Mid-Coast Council	New South Wales			
Koorainghat	Mid-Coast Council	New South Wales			31°59′21″S 152°28′29″E
Kulnura	Central Coast Council	New South Wales			33°13′55″S 151°13′5″E
Kunama	Snowy Valleys Council	New South Wales			
Kurrajong Heights	City of Hawkesbury	New South Wales			33°33′S 150°40′E
Lake Conjola	City of Shoalhaven	New South Wales			35°16′S 150°29′E
Laurel Hill	Snowy Valleys Council	New South Wales		4 homes destroyed	
Lilli Pilli	Eurobodalla Shire	New South Wales			
Little Forest	City of Shoalhaven	New South Wales			
Lower Bago	Snowy Valleys Council	New South Wales			
Lower Creek	Armidale Regional Council	New South Wales			
Mallacoota	Shire of East Gippsland	Victoria	26 December 2019 -	at least 300 homes lost	37°33′0″S 149°45′0″E
Malua Bay	Eurobodalla Shire	New South Wales	31 December 2019		35°48′S 150°14′E
Mangrove Creek	Central Coast Council	New South Wales			33°20′24″S 151°08′35″E
Manyana	City of Shoalhaven	New South Wales			
Maragle	Snowy Valleys Council	New South Wales			
Marlee	Mid-Coast Council	New South Wales			
Merricumbene	Eurobodalla Shire	New South Wales			35°44′03″S 149°53′43″E
Mogo	Eurobodalla Shire	New South Wales	31 December 2019		
Mogood	City of Shoalhaven	New South Wales			
Moollattoo	City of Shoalhaven	New South Wales			
Mooral Creek	Mid-Coast Council	New South Wales			
Mororo	Clarence Valley Council	New South Wales			29°20′S 153°15′E
Morton	City of Shoalhaven	New South Wales			
Morts Estate	City of Lithgow	New South Wales			
Mount George	Mid-Coast Council	New South Wales			31°53′00″S 152°11′00″E
Mount Marsh	Richmond Valley Council	New South Wales			
Mount Seaview	Port Macquarie-Hastings Council	New South Wales			
Mount Tomah	City of Blue Mountains	New South Wales			33°33′S 150°25′E
Mount Victoria	City of Blue Mountains	New South Wales			33°35′S 150°15′E
Mount Wilson	City of Blue Mountains	New South Wales			33°30′S 150°23′E
Mulloon	Queanbeyan-Palerang Regional Council	New South Wales			
Nabiac	Mid-Coast Council	New South Wales			32°06′S 152°23′E
Nana Glen	City of Coffs Harbour	New South Wales			30°08′S 153°00′E
Narrabauba	Bega Valley Shire Council	New South Wales			
Nelligen	Eurobodalla Shire	New South Wales			35°38′51″S 150°08′29″E
Neriga	Queanbeyan-Palerang Regional Council	New South Wales			
Nerrigundah	Eurobodalla Shire	New South Wales			35°38′51″S 150°08′29″E
Neringla	Queanbeyan-Palerang Regional Council	New South Wales			
New Italy	Richmond Valley Council	New South Wales			
Newnes	City of Lithgow	New South Wales			33°10′45″S 150°14′09″E
Newton Boyd	Clarence Valley Council	New South Wales			
Nimbin	Lismore City Council	New South Wales			28°35′45″S 153°13′23″E
Nowra	City of Shoalhaven	New South Wales			34°53′S 150°36′E
Nowra Hill	City of Shoalhaven	New South Wales			
Nullica	Bega Valley Shire Council	New South Wales			
Nerenmerenmong	Snowy Valleys Council	New South Wales			
Nymboida	Clarence Valley Council	New South Wales			29°56′S 152°53′E
Oakdale	Blue Mountains National Park	New South Wales			
Orangeville	Blue Mountains National Park	New South Wales			
Oallen	Queanbeyan-Palerang Regional Council	New South Wales			
Paddys Flat	Kyogle Council	New South Wales			
Paddys River	Snowy Valleys Council	New South Wales			
Pappinbarra	Port Macquarie-Hastings Council	New South Wales			
Parma	City of Shoalhaven	New South Wales			
Payness Crossing	Singleton Council	New South Wales			
Penrose	Wingecarribee Shire	New South Wales			
Possum Brush	Mid-Coast Council	New South Wales			
Quaama	Bega Valley Shire Council	New South Wales			36°27′53″S 149°52′08″E
Rainbow Flat	Mid-Coast Council	New South Wales			
Rappville	Richmond Valley Council	New South Wales	8 October 2019	40 homes destroyed, 2 deaths	
Rosedale	Eurobodalla Shire	New South Wales	31 December 2019		35°49′S 150°13′E
Running Stream	City of Lithgow	New South Wales			
Running Stream	Mid-Western Regional Council	New South Wales			
Runnyford	Eurobodalla Shire	New South Wales			
Sassafras	City of Shoalhaven	New South Wales			
Shannon Vale	Glen Innes Southern Shire Council	New South Wales			
Sharps Creek	Snowy Valleys Council	New South Wales			
Silent Grove	Tenterfield Shire	New South Wales			
South Arm	Nambucca Shire Council	New South Wales			
Spencer	Central Coast Council	New South Wales			
Sundy Gully	Snowy Valleys Council	New South Wales			
Surf Beach	Eurobodalla Shire	New South Wales			
Sussex Inlet	City of Shoalhaven	New South Wales			
Tabulam	Tenterfield Shire	New South Wales			
Talarm	Nambucca Shire Council	New South Wales			
Talbingo	Snowy Valleys Council	New South Wales		6 homes destroyed	
Tallong	Goulburn Mulwaree Council	New South Wales			34°43′0″S 150°05′0″E
Tantawangalo	Bega Valley Shire	New South Wales	1 February 2020		
Taradale	Snowy Valleys Council	New South Wales			
Ten Mile Hollow	City of Hawkesbury	New South Wales			33°19′17″S 151°5′17″E
Termeil	City of Shoalhaven	New South Wales			
Thrumster	Port Macquarie-Hastings Council	New South Wales			
Thumb Creek	Nambucca Shire Council	New South Wales			
Tianjara	City of Shoalhaven	New South Wales			
Timbillica	Bega Valley Shire Council	New South Wales			
Tinonee	Mid-Coast Council	New South Wales			31°56′S 152°25′E
Tinpot	Eurobodalla Shire	New South Wales			
Tomboye	Queanbeyan-Palerang Regional Council	New South Wales			
Tomerong	City of Shoalhaven	New South Wales			
Torrington	Tenterfield Shire	New South Wales			
Towamba	Bega Valley Shire Council	New South Wales			37°05′S 149°41′E
Towong	Shire of Towong	Victoria			36°07′34″S 147°59′13″E
Tumbarumba	Snowy Valleys Council	New South Wales	1 January 2020	7 homes destroyed	35°47′0″S 148°01′0″E
Upper Lansdowne	Mid-Coast Council	New South Wales			
Upper Pappinbarra	Port Macquarie-Hastings Council	New South Wales			
Upper Town Flower	Clarence Valley Council	New South Wales			
Utungun	Nambucca Shire Council	New South Wales			
Verona	Bega Valley Shire Council	New South Wales			
Wandandian	City of Shoalhaven	New South Wales			
Wandella	Bega Valley Shire Council	New South Wales			
Warri	Queanbeyan-Palerang Regional Council	New South Wales			
Webbs Creek	City of Hawkesbury	New South Wales			33°21′S 150°56′E
Werombi	Blue Mountains National Park	New South Wales			
Willawarrin	Kempsey Shire	New South Wales			
Willi Willi	Kempsey Shire	New South Wales			
Willigobung	Snowy Valleys Council	New South Wales			
Wingello	Wingecarribee Shire	New South Wales			
Whiporie	Richmond Valley Council	New South Wales			
Wittitrin	Kempsey Shire	New South Wales			
Wog Wog	Queanbeyan-Palerang Regional Council	New South Wales			
Wolgan Valley	City of Lithgow	New South Wales			
Wombeyan Caves	Upper Lachlan Shire	New South Wales			
Wombeyan Caves	Wingecarribee Shire	New South Wales			
Wonboyn	Bega Valley Shire Council	New South Wales			37°15′S 149°55′E
Wondalga	Snowy Valleys Council	New South Wales		4 homes destroyed	
Woodburn	City of Shoalhaven	New South Wales			
Woodlands	Eurobodalla Shire	New South Wales			
Wyndham	Bega Valley Shire	New South Wales	1 February 2020		
Yarranbella	Nambucca Shire Council	New South Wales			
Yarras	Port Macquarie-Hastings Council	New South Wales			
Yarrowitch	Walcha Shire	New South Wales			
Yatteyattah	City of Shoalhaven	New South Wales			
Yaven Creek	Snowy Valleys Council	New South Wales			
Yowrie	Bega Valley Shire Council	New South Wales			
Peregian Beach	Sunshine Coast Region	Queensland			26.4663°S 153.0636°E
Ravensbourne	Toowoomba Region	Queensland			27°21′S 152°9′E
Stanthorpe	Southern Downs Region	Queensland			

== Impact to National Parks of the 2019–20 Australian bushfire season ==
National Park	State	Impact Dates	Impact
Blue Mountains National Park	New South Wales		
Flinders Chase National Park	South Australia		
French Island National Park	Victoria	15 January 2020 -	
Kanangra-Boyd National Park	New South Wales		
Kosciuszko National Park	New South Wales		Destroyed buildings include: Delaneys Hut, Sawyers Hill Rest House, Happys Hut, Wolgal Lodge, Kiandra Court House, Pattersons Hut, Matthews Cottage, Round Mountain Hut, Bradley and O’Briens Hut, Four Mile Hut
Lane Cove National Park	New South Wales		
Morton National Park	New South Wales		
Namadgi National Park	Australian Capital Territory	27 January 2020 -	50% of the national park burnt as of 2 February 2020 80% of the national park burnt as of 8 February 2020
Stirling Range National Park	Western Australia		
Wollemi National Park	New South Wales		
Woomargama National Park	New South Wales		
Yengo National Park	New South Wales		
