= Bega Valley Regional Gallery =

Public art gallery and cultural centre in Bega, NSW, Australia

- Location: Zingel Place, Bega
- Coordinates: 36°40′33″S 149°50′33″E
- Website: gallery.begavalley.nsw.gov.au

The South East Centre for Contemporary Art (SECCA) formerly known as Bega Valley Regional Gallery is a publicly funded art gallery and cultural facility located in the town centre of Bega in south eastern New South Wales, Australia. The gallery showcases contemporary Australian visual culture with up to ten exhibitions annually. In 2016 the gallery expanded its footprint as the cultural outpost on Australia’s Coastal Wilderness and launched two project spaces, one at the Merimbula Airport and one at the Port of Eden Welcome Centre.

SECCA is the only publicly funded art gallery in South Eastern New South Wales with its closest neighbours being Goulburn Regional Art Gallery to the north west, Murray Art Museum Albury to the south west and the Shoalhaven Regional Gallery to the north.

The gallery currently employs a full-time curator and casual access and learning facilitator. As of 2016 the gallery staff and council developed a five-year strategic plan for the gallery. Despite physical limitations, the gallery delivers up to 40 public programs and outreach activities within the local government and regional area per year, including film nights, traditional drawing, printmaking and painting workshops as well as new media and film-based workshops, curatorial lectures, visiting artist and academic lectures and professional development seminars for artists. The gallery aligns with council's Community Strategic Plan and develops activities along its guiding principles of Equity, Access and Participation.

== The Future ==
For many Australians, arts and culture have become more accessible as a result of the pandemic. Since March 2020, arts organisations have expanded their digital business operations and delivery of arts experiences online. The digital shift accelerated by COVID-19 has the potential to enable more people with disability to participate in the arts and cultural labour force as well as access arts experiences. This is also true for Australians living in regional areas. Prior to the pandemic, regional Australians were already highly engaged, attending arts events at almost the same level of frequency as metropolitan-based Australians (64% compared to 70%).24 As a result of the arts’ agile shift to digital delivery, 67% of attendees of regional and remote arts organisations are currently accessing arts and cultural content online.25 In addition to digital access, face to face engagement is important for communities to connect. We have an opportunity to make sure the industry becomes representative of, and accessible to, the wider Australian population at all levels, across all regions and areas of practice.

== History ==
The gallery in its current location, within the headquarters of the Bega Valley Shire Council, has existed since 1988 when it was built with a promise of $500,000 Australian Bicentenary funding from the federal government. Due to delays in the building of the facility the funding was removed, despite the gallery eventually being finished within the projected timeframe. This led to the gallery being not so much purpose built as a modern art gallery, but as a rudimentary exhibition space. Nonetheless, the local community has embraced the gallery and the space attracts around 12,000 visitors annually. The gallery was created to address the need of a local organisation, the Bega Valley Arts and Crafts Society, to have a permanent space for it to exhibit and display its art collection. The group had been housed in a succession of locations within Bega since its formation in 1946. With the creation of the Regional Gallery, the society entrusted its collection to the council to hold on behalf of the community. The collection is an historical one featuring paintings by Hilda Rix Nicholas, Julian Ashton and prints by Sydney Long. The three pieces of Hilda Rix Nicholas' in the collection have been on regular loan since the artist was 'rediscovered' in the 2010s. The works have been included in exhibitions at the National Portrait Gallery and the Mosman Art Gallery In early 2021 the BVRG will begin a redevelopment project which includes doubling the footprint of the exhibition space, new workshop/project space facilities and a gallery to accommodate its growing permanent collection. The project has been part funded by The Australian Government through its Building Better Regional Fund (BBRF). Despite being ranked the number one candidate in the NSW State Governments $100 million Regional Cultural Fund round in 2018, the BVRG was not awarded the $3.4 million needed to complete the redevelopment program at an earlier date.

== Funding ==
The gallery is funded by the Bega Valley Shire Council through a special rate variation in recognition of the importance of the visual arts within the region and as such, visual arts practitioners make up a large proportion of the community. Arts NSW, now Create NSW, provides annual funding for the gallery's artistic program. The gallery actively applies for grants to further extend its artistic and public programs from external funding bodies, locally and at state and federal levels.

== The Collection ==
The BVRG manages the collection of the Bega Valley Arts & Craft Society and the Shirley Hannan Trust. It also is a leader of artistic and cultural vision for the community and as such is heavily involved in the commissioning and maintenance of public art throughout the region.

The focus of the BVRG permanent collection is contemporary portraiture, landscape and contemporary Indigenous artworks. BVRG is registered to receive donations to the collection via The Australian Governments Cultural Gift Program. BVRG has Deductible Gift Recipient (DGR) Status.

== Awards and prizes ==
The gallery also administers the biannual Shirley Hannan National Portrait Award, a unique prize which focuses on realistic portraiture and has a non-acquisitive prize of $50,000, a $1,000 'mailroom' prize and a $3,000 'people's choice award'.

In 2014 the BVRG announced a new annual prize, 'The Shirl' National Youth Portraiture Prize, aimed at engaging young artists, 16–25 and with an acquisitive prize of $10,000. Each winning work will be added to the gallery's permanent collection

== Volunteers ==
The gallery depends on volunteers to set up and supervise exhibitions, to assist with maintenance and upkeep of the gallery and to staff exhibition openings and also assist with public programs. A core group of 40 people, mostly retirees with tertiary education or from a professional background and with a strong community focus, make up the Regional Gallery Volunteers.

== Memberships ==
The Bega Valley Regional Gallery is a member of the National Association for the Visual Arts, Museums & Galleries NSW, Regional & Public Galleries NSW and the Aboriginal Culture, Heritage & Arts Association.
