= Yowaka River =

Coordinates: 36°59′30″S 149°49′30″E

Yowaka River Back Creek

Location
- Country: Australia
- State: New South Wales
- Region: South East Corner (IBRA), South Coast
- Local government area: Bega Valley

Physical characteristics
- Source: Bold Granite Range
  - location: southeast of Wyndham
  - elevation: 285 m (935 ft)
- Mouth: confluence with the Pambula River to form Pambula Lake
  - location: south of Pambula
  - elevation: 0 m (0 ft)
- Length: 22 km (14 mi)

Basin features
- River system: Tuross River catchment
- Tributaries
  - right: Old Hut Creek
- Bridges: Greigs Flat bridge
- Reservoir: Pambula Lake

Yowaka River, a perennial river of the Pambula River catchment, is located in the South Coast region of New South Wales, Australia.

== Course and features ==
Yowaka River rises on the eastern slopes of the Bold Granite Range, southeast of Wyndham and flows generally south, east, and then northeast, joined by one minor tributary before reaching its confluence with the Pambula River within Pambula Lake. The river descends 290 metres (950 ft) over its 22 kilometres (14 mi) course.

The Princes Highway crosses the river between Pambula and Eden via the heritage-listed Greigs Flat bridge.

== See also ==
- Yowaka River bridge, Greigs Flat
- Rivers of New South Wales
- List of rivers of New South Wales (L–Z)
- List of rivers of Australia
