= Davidson Whaling Station =

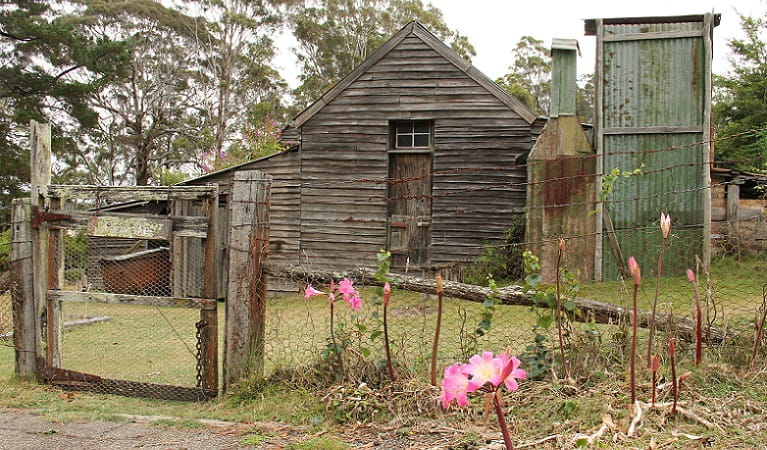
- The detached kitchen and dining room on the site

- Location within New South Wales Location within Australia
- 37.1117°S 149.9157°E
- Location: Edrom, Bega Valley Shire, New South Wales, Australia

History
- Built: 1896–1896

Site notes
- Owner: Office of Environment and Heritage

New South Wales Heritage Register
- Official name: Davidson Whaling Station
- Type: state heritage (complex / group)
- Designated: 2 April 1999
- Reference no.: 984
- Type: Whaling Station
- Category: Maritime Industry

Davidson Whaling Station is a heritage-listed former whaling station at Edrom on the far South Coast of New South Wales, Australia. It was built in 1896. The property is owned by the New South Wales Office of Environment and Heritage. It was added to the New South Wales State Heritage Register on 2 April 1999.

== History ==
Shore-based whaling at Twofold Bay began in 1828 and was undertaken by numerous whaling groups, the main ones being the Imlay brothers, Benjamin Boyd and the Davidson family. Old open boat techniques were in continuous use at Twofold Bay for over 100 years.

The Davidson family began whaling around 1860. A tryworks for boiling down the blubber was built inside Kiah Inlet, possibly on the site of an earlier tryworks, where whales could be drawn up on a sandy beach. In 1896 George Davidson built the cottage, Loch Garra, above the tryworks on 17 acres of leasehold land. This land now comprises the majority of the historic site. In 1920 when Davidson applied to convert his leasehold to free title his holding consisted of a cleared, partly fenced area with a 6-room weather-board house, detached kitchen, workshop, established orchard, garden, and dam. Further outbuildings and additions to the cottage were added later. Dr and Mrs Boyd, who purchased the property for a private residence in 1954, replanted much of the garden area and made further additions to the cottage.

Until the first decade of this century, whaling was carried out almost full-time from the station by Alexander Davidson, his son John and grandson George. A catch of 10–15 whales each season was reported. After that time whaling became an opportunistic activity with George Davidson undertaking farming and grazing on the site to buffer the whaling station against fluctuations in the market and uneven seasonal catches. By 1925 the entire catch for the season was reported at 2 whales.

In 1927 Davidson Whaling Station was described by Professor Dakin, an early authority on the marine biology of the Australian coastline, as dating from Melville's time, using the technologies of "the old bay whalers of the 1840s". In 1929 the last Whale was caught at Twofold Bay. The Davidsons moved from the station in the 1940s.

== Description ==
Davidson Whaling Station is located on the southern shore of Twofold Bay, 35 km by road south of Eden on Kiah Inlet at the mouth of the Towamba River. The buildings still existing on the site comprise the cottage "Loch Garra", the detached kitchen/dining room which may have pre-dated the cottage, a garden shed and a shower shed built by the Boyds.

The buildings are of timber construction with traditional weatherboards or timber slab external cladding and corrugated iron roofing.

Remnants of the Davidson's gardens include the collapsed and overgrown fences of the orchard to the east of the cottage garden and the lawn outside the garden fence. This section also includes an old dam. The existing garden was a creation of the Boyds.

Only fragments of the brick footings and fireplace, some roofing timbers and three ship's tanks used as pots for the storage and transport of whale blubber remain on the site.

The remainder of the site consists of an open woodland of woollybutt and silver-top ash on the exposed ridge, with a moist forest of black wattle and pittosporum in the gullies and monkey gum with bracken undergrowth on the slopes above Kiah Inlet.

Historic artefacts occur throughout the site.

A number of Aboriginal middens have been recorded. One is located under the brick footings of the tryworks and extends towards the inlet. Another, located above the cottages, is known to have been the site of a women's camp during the whaling period. A large midden is located on the headland and isolated shells and artefacts are scattered throughout the site.

A shield tree, now dead, is enclosed in situ within the storage compound.

The archaeological potential of the site was reported to be high as at 28 July 1997.

The entire site is relatively undisturbed although some structures are no longer extant.

== Heritage listing ==
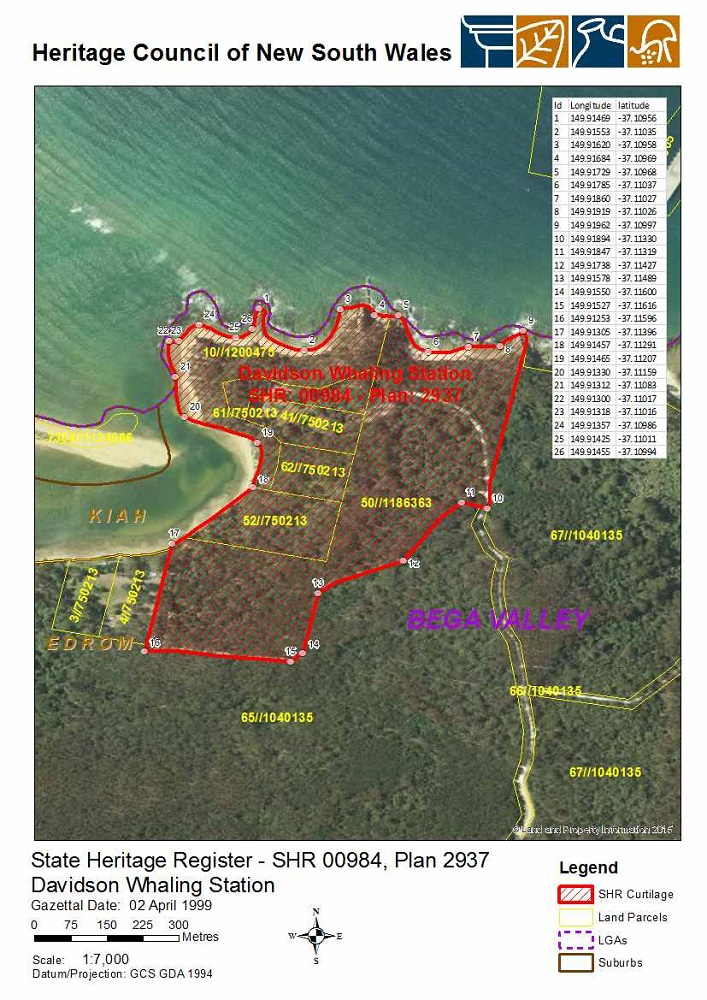
Boundaries of the heritage listing

Davidson Whaling Station is of State significance. It was the longest operating whaling station in Australia and the last of its type to close down. It has associations with the 19th-century shore-based whaling industry of south east Australia and with the Imlay brothers, Benjamin Boyd, Oswald Brierly, the Davidson and Boyd families and the Aboriginal whalers and their families.

Although some of the structures are no longer extant, the remaining features reflect the original use of the site as a whaling station. Later additions associated with the Boyd occupation are of a lesser significance, representing the rural retreat of professional people.

The entire site is relatively undisturbed and has high archaeological potential to contribute information on shore-based whaling, Aboriginal and European contact and 20th-century alternative lifestyles. The site with its small cottage buildings, fruit trees and garden flowers, and overlooking the tryworks and Kiah Inlet, has an undisturbed sense of history.

Davidson Whaling Station was listed on the New South Wales State Heritage Register on 2 April 1999 having satisfied the following criteria.

The place is important in demonstrating the course, or pattern, of cultural or natural history in New South Wales.

Davidson whaling station is the longest operating whaling station in Australia and the last of its type to close down. It has associations with the 19th-century whaling industry in Australia and the shore-based whaling industry of the south east coast of Australia. The station is associated with the Davidson family, and through that family and its activities, it had associations with Benjamin Boyd, Oswald Brierly and the Imlay brothers during the 1830s and 1840s.

Whaling at Twofold Bay utilised Aboriginal labour to a remarkable extent throughout its 100 years of operation. From the mid 19th century there is historical evidence of a combination of traditional Aboriginal and European whaler lifestyles among the Aborigines engaged in whaling.

Davidson Whaling Station is one of few shore-based whaling stations in Australia with in situ remains. These include the remains of the tryworks, the cottage and living quarters, some components of the garden and many artefacts from the whaling period.

The cottage and kitchen building provide evidence of a lengthy European occupation of the site, and in particular, direct reference to the occupation of the site by the Davidson (1860s–1940s) and Boyd (1952–1984) families.

Davidson Whaling Station was associated with several other whaling sites around Twofold Bay such as Boydtown, Boyds Tower and East Boyd.

In addition to its whaling history, the site contains evidence of early to mid-twentieth-century bush architecture and cottage gardening practices.

The place is important in demonstrating aesthetic characteristics and/or a high degree of creative or technical achievement in New South Wales.

Davidson Whaling Station is located in a spectacular natural setting and possesses a tranquility and sense of remoteness and respite from the developed world.

There is a demonstratable relation between the built environment, the garden landscape and the natural setting. The location of the whaling station on the edge of Kiah Inlet with a backdrop of native forest is particularly attractive.

The rather dilapidated appearance of the buildings makes the visitor aware of the processes of time while at the same time creating a strong sense of the past.

The gardens and the wide variety of birds seen and heard at the site also contribute to Davidson Whaling Station's high aesthetic value.

The place has a strong or special association with a particular community or cultural group in New South Wales for social, cultural or spiritual reasons.

The historic structures and records illustrate clearly the living and working conditions of a whaling station. The site is important as a social focus for many Davidson descendants, descendants of the Aboriginal whalers and other figures associated with the whaling industry who are residents of the Eden District.

The place has potential to yield information that will contribute to an understanding of the cultural or natural history of New South Wales.

As the longest operating shore-based whaling station on the east coast of Australia, Davidson Whaling Station is a most significant archaeological resource. It possesses a relatively undisturbed sequence of prehistoric and historic archaeological remains which have the potential to provide information on pre-European Aboriginal lifestyles and practices, the Aboriginal European contact period and 20th century isolated lifestyles.

The tryworks site is tangible evidence of the "trying down" processes at the whaling station and is the only such site remaining in Australia. The tryworks site comprises remnants of the brick footings and hearth once used to boil down whale blubber, a number of timber artefacts and three ships tanks. The tryworks were built on top of an Aboriginal midden from which an archaeological investigation revealed the remains of a dingo.

The place possesses uncommon, rare or endangered aspects of the cultural or natural history of New South Wales.

Davidson Whaling Station is the longest operating whaling station in Australia, the last of its type to close down and one of few shore-based whaling station with in situ remains.
