= Wog Wog (disambiguation) =

Wog Wog is a locality in the Queanbeyan–Palerang Regional Council, New South Wales, Australia.

Wog Wog or wogwog or variation, may also refer to:

- Wog Wog River, New South Wales, Australia
- Wog Wog Mountain, Budawang Range, New South Wales, Australia

== Other uses ==
- Paralampona wogwog (P. wogwog), a species of spider

== See also ==
- WOG (disambiguation)
