= Courunga =

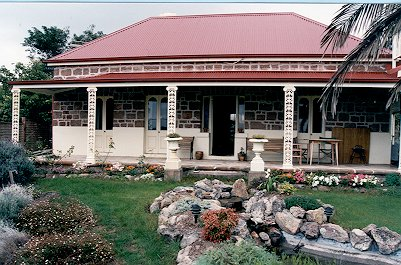

- Location within New South Wales Location within Australia
- 36.8913°S 149.9076°E
- Location: Monaro Street, Merimbula, Bega Valley Shire, New South Wales, Australia

History
- Built: 1870–1880

Site notes
- Owner: Merimbula Veterinary Clinic

New South Wales Heritage Register
- Official name: Courunga; Munn's Tower House
- Type: state heritage (built)
- Designated: 2 April 1999
- Reference no.: 235
- Type: House
- Category: Residential buildings (private)
- Builders: Matthew Munn

Courunga is a heritage-listed residence at Monaro Street, Merimbula, on the South Coast of New South Wales, Australia. It was built from 1870 to 1880 by Matthew Munn. It is also known as Munn's Tower House. The property is owned by Merimbula Veterinary Clinic. It was added to the New South Wales State Heritage Register on 2 April 1999.

== History ==
The property known as Courunga, formerly Munns Tower House, was constructed about 1870 by Matthew Munn and extensions added by his son Armstrong Lockhart about 1880.

Matthew Munn was founder of the important Maizena Cornflour Company and had a large installation and holdings at Merimbula. The cottage was built at the time Merimbula was a pastoral village, owned firstly by the Twofold Bay Pastoral Company and later by the Munn family.

The Munn name is synonymous with the emergence of modern Merimbula as the family had large holdings and milling operations in the district which were central to the economy of the town in its infancy.

In 1979 an Interim Conservation Order was placed over the property. In March 1981 the Minister for Planning and Environment gave notice of his intention to make a Permanent Conservation Order in respect of Munn's Tower House. In response the owner put forward a scheme to restore the house as a residence and use the surrounding land for the construction of 25 home units. After variations were made to the scheme to meet comments from the Heritage Council the application was approved in August 1981. On 11 June 1982 a Permanent Conservation Order was placed over the property.

On 18 June 1982 a further application for the construction of an additional six units was made. This application was refused by the Heritage Council as it was considered to be detrimental to the heritage significance of Courunga. The applicant objected and a Commission of Inquiry was held in 1984. The Inquiry recommended that the proposal for six additional home units be approved.

== Description ==
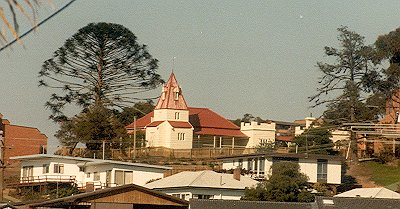
The physical prominence and landmark status of the tower house mirror the social and economic prominence of the Munn family

Courunga is a substantial stone cottage sited on a commanding hill-top. It contains elaborate joinery and originally had a shingle roof and later elaborated with cast iron stanchions.

The house achieved its present remarkable character through the addition of a two-storey Victorian Gothic corner tower of timber construction, together with two further Gothic pavilions of timber construction, one being the kitchen, both complete with crenellated parapets.

== Heritage listing ==
Courunga, formerly Munns Tower House, was constructed about 1870 by Matthew Munn. It is a large distinctive stone cottage with an extraordinary addition (1880) consisting of a two-storey timber tower with attic, and two single storey timber pavilions with castellated parapets. The Munn name is synonymous with the emergence of modern Merimbula as the family had large holdings and milling operations in the district which were central to the economy of the town in its infancy. The physical prominence and landmark status of the tower house mirror the social and economic prominence of the Munn family in Merimbula in the period of its early development.

Courunga was listed on the New South Wales State Heritage Register on 2 April 1999 having satisfied the following criteria.

The place is important in demonstrating the course, or pattern, of cultural or natural history in New South Wales.

The Munn name is synonymous with the emergence of modern Merimbula as the family had large holdings and milling operations in the district which were central to the economy of the town in its infancy. The physical prominence and landmark status of the tower house mirror the social and economic prominence of the Munn family in Merimbula in the period of its early development.

The place is important in demonstrating aesthetic characteristics and/or a high degree of creative or technical achievement in New South Wales.

The building's architectural significance is confirmed by its massing of forms which have been expressed in an unusual architectural idiom – that of the castellated Gothic style. This form of architectural folly is rare for its period and for the State generally.

The building was prominently sited in a picturesque setting intended to reinforce the illusion. It can be seen from miles around and has landmark qualities.
