= Towamba River bridge, New Buildings =

Historic bridge in New South Wales, Australia

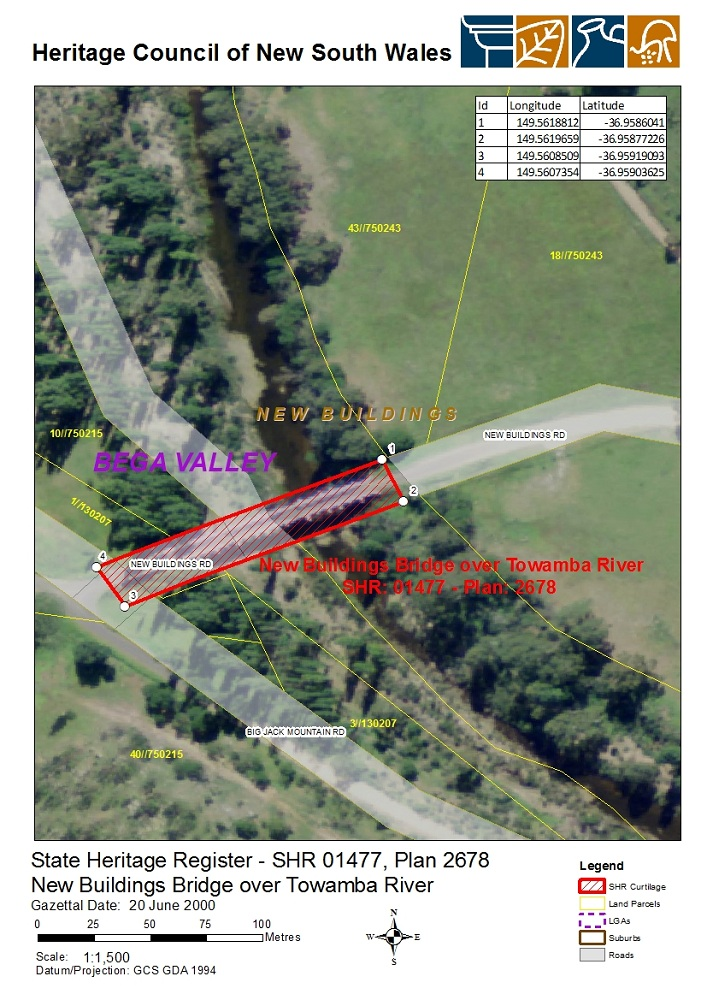
- Heritage boundaries
- Coordinates: 36°57′32″S 149°33′42″E
- Carries: Towamba Road: Motor vehicles; Pedestrians; Bicycles
- Crosses: Towamba River
- Locale: New Buildings, New South Wales, Australia
- Owner: Transport for NSW
- Maintained by: Bega Valley Shire

Characteristics
- Design: Low-level
- Material: Timber

History
- Construction end: c. 1919-20
- Replaces: Previous bridge (????-1919)

New South Wales Heritage Register
- Official name: New Buildings Bridge over Towamba River; Towamba River bridge, New Buildings
- Type: State heritage (built)
- Designated: 20 June 2000
- Reference no.: 1477
- Type: Road Bridge
- Category: Transport - Land

The Towamba River bridge is a heritage-listed road bridge that carries Towamba Road across the Towamba River at New Buildings, New South Wales, Australia. The bridge is owned by Transport for NSW. The bridge is also called the New Buildings Bridge over Towamba River. It was added to the New South Wales State Heritage Register on 20 June 2000.

== History ==
The current timber low-level bridge was built in c. 1919-20 following the destruction of the previous bridge in a major flood in 1919. The bridge carries motor vehicles and, via a grade-separated path, carries both pedestrians and bicycles.

The bridge had been closed for repairs for several weeks in 2017 following issues discovered in routine inspections.

== Heritage listing ==
The New Buildings Bridge over Towamba River was listed on the New South Wales State Heritage Register on 20 June 2000.

== See also ==
- List of bridges in Australia
