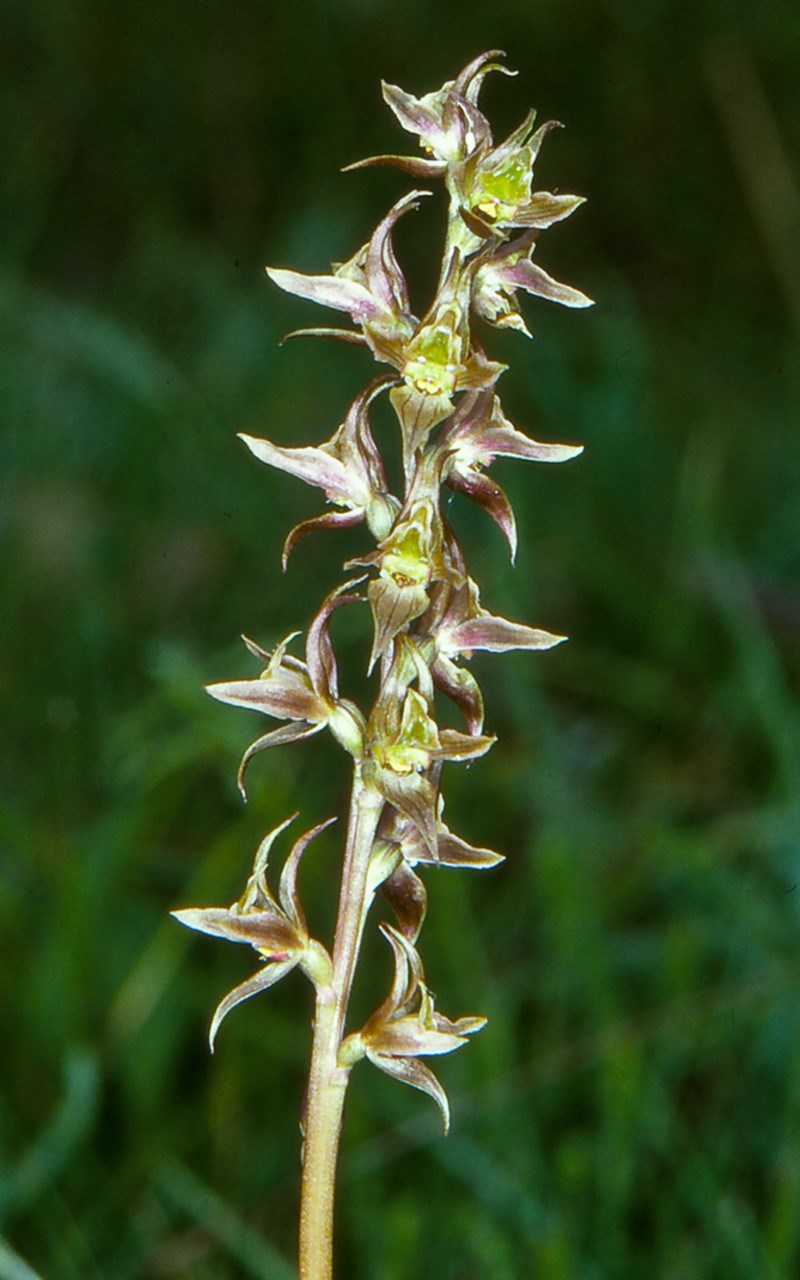
- Near Bombala

Scientific classification
- Kingdom: Plantae
- Clade: Embryophytes
- Clade: Tracheophytes
- Clade: Spermatophytes
- Clade: Angiosperms
- Clade: Monocots
- Order: Asparagales
- Family: Orchidaceae
- Subfamily: Orchidoideae
- Tribe: Diurideae
- Subtribe: Prasophyllinae
- Genus: Prasophyllum
- Species: P. wilkinsoniorum

Binomial name
- Prasophyllum wilkinsoniorum D.L.Jones

= Prasophyllum wilkinsoniorum =

Species of orchid

Prasophyllum wilkinsoniorum is a species of orchid endemic to New South Wales. It has a single tubular, bright green leaf and up to forty five scented, dark greenish-brown to brownish-red flowers with a green to pinkish labellum. It grows in grassy places in a restricted area on the Southern Tablelands.

== Description ==
Prasophyllum wilkinsoniorum is a terrestrial, perennial, deciduous, herb with an underground tuber and a single bright green, tube-shaped leaf, 300–400 mm (10–20 in) long with a white to reddish base. Between fifteen and forty five flowers are arranged along a flowering spike up to 450 mm (20 in) high. The flowers are dark greenish-brown to brownish-red and scented. As with others in the genus, the flowers are inverted so that the labellum is above the column rather than below it. The dorsal sepal is egg-shaped to lance-shaped, 8–11 mm (0.3–0.4 in) long, about 4 mm (0.2 in) wide and turned downwards. The lateral sepals are linear to lance-shaped, 8–11 mm (0.3–0.4 in) long, about 2 mm (0.08 in) wide and the petals are linear to narrow lance-shaped, 8–12 mm (0.3–0.5 in) long and about 2 mm (0.08 in) wide. The labellum is green to pinkish, broadly egg-shaped to lance-shaped, 7–9 mm (0.3–0.4 in) long, about 5 mm (0.2 in) wide and turns sharply upwards with wavy edges. There is a fleshy green to brown callus in the centre of the labellum. Flowering occurs from December to January.

== Taxonomy and naming ==
Prasophyllum wilkinsoniorum was first formally described in 2000 by David Jones from a specimen collected near Tantawangalo and the description was published in The Orchadian.

== Distribution and habitat ==
This leek orchid grows between Cathcart and Tantawangalo, usually in grassy flat areas.
