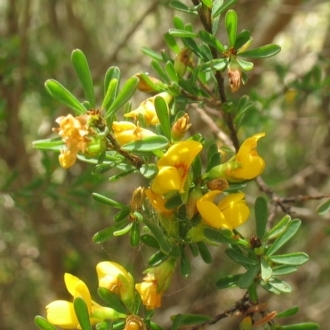
- Pultenaea altissima near Tantawangalo

Scientific classification
- Kingdom: Plantae
- Clade: Tracheophytes
- Clade: Angiosperms
- Clade: Eudicots
- Clade: Rosids
- Order: Fabales
- Family: Fabaceae
- Subfamily: Faboideae
- Genus: Pultenaea
- Species: P. altissima

Binomial name
- Pultenaea altissima F.Muell. ex Benth.

Synonyms
- Bartlingia obovata (Sieber ex DC.) Brongn. ex Meisn.; Cryptandra obovata Sieber ex DC.; Pultenaea flexilis var. altissima (F.Muell. ex Benth.) Maiden & Betche; Pultenaea obovata Benth.

= Pultenaea altissima =

Tall bush-pea

Species of flowering plant

Pultenaea altissima, commonly known as tall bush-pea, is a species of flowering plant in the family Fabaceae and is endemic to south-eastern continental Australia. It is an erect shrub with spatula-shaped to egg-shaped leaves and yellow flowers in clusters at the ends of branches.

== Description ==
Pultenaea altissima is an erect shrub that typically grows to a height of 2–3 m (6 ft 7 in – 9 ft 10 in) with often drooping, glabrous branches. The leaves are spatula-shaped to egg-shaped with the narrower end towards the base, 5–15 mm (0.20–0.59 in) long and 1.5–3 mm (0.059–0.118 in) wide with stipules 1–2 mm (0.039–0.079 in) long at the base. The flowers are borne in clusters in leaf axils at the ends of the branchlets on pedicels 2–3 mm (0.079–0.118 in) long with bracteoles 1–1.5 mm (0.039–0.059 in) long at the base of the sepals. The sepals are 3–5 mm (0.12–0.20 in) long and mostly glabrous and the standard petal is yellow and 9–10 mm (0.35–0.39 in) long. Flowering occurs from September to October and the fruit is an oval pod 5–7 mm (0.20–0.28 in) long.

== Taxonomy and naming ==
Pultenaea altissima was first formally described in 1864 by George Bentham in Flora Australiensis from an unpublished description by Ferdinand von Mueller. The specific epithet (altissima) means "very tall".

== Distribution and habitat ==
This pultenaea grows in heath and woodland, often near swamps or watercourse, on the tablelands of New South Wales, south-eastern Queensland and the far north-east of Victoria.
