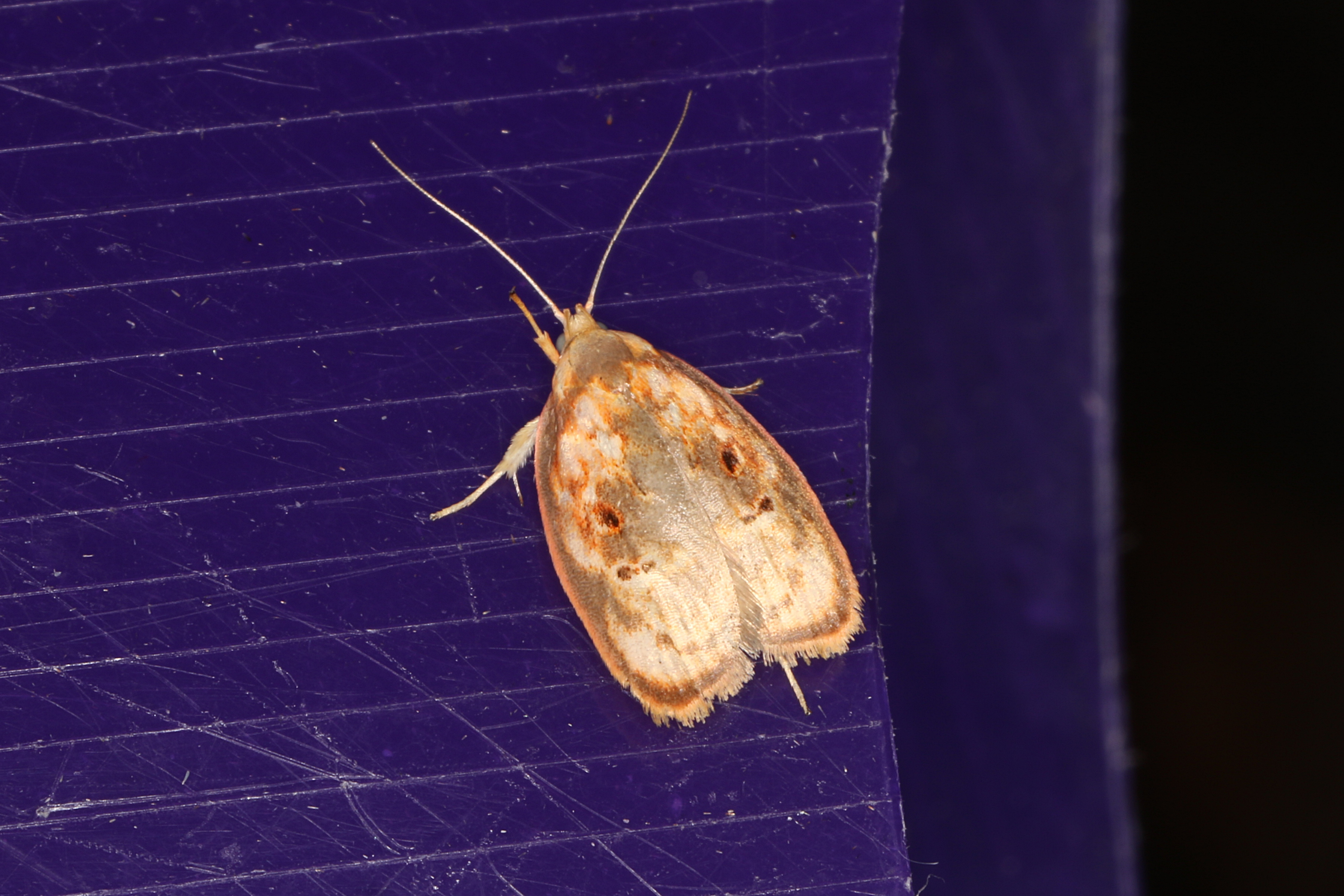
- In Merimbula, New South Wales, Australia

Scientific classification
- Kingdom: Animalia
- Phylum: Arthropoda
- Class: Insecta
- Order: Lepidoptera
- Family: Oecophoridae
- Genus: Eochrois
- Species: E. sarcoxantha

Binomial name
- Eochrois sarcoxantha (Lower, 1893)

Synonyms
- Euchaetis sarcoxantha Lower, 1893; Machimia zelota Turner, 1916

= Eochrois sarcoxantha =

Species of moth

Eochrois sarcoxantha is a moth in the family Oecophoridae described by Oswald Bertram Lower in 1893. It is found in Australia, where it has been recorded from New South Wales and Victoria.

The wingspan is about 21 mm. The forewings are leaden grey with a pink costal streak and the extreme costal edge whitish. There is a whitish-ochreous basal spot and an irregular, whitish-ochreous blotch reticulated with reddish ochreous, extending from near the base of the dorsum as a broad streak roughly parallel to the costa as far as the middle. There is also a dark fuscous circular spot beneath this before the middle of the disc and two dark fuscous spots edged with whitish ochreous placed transversely in the disc beyond the middle, as well as a whitish-ochreous, subapical blotch traversed by an interrupted, reddish-ochreous, obliquely transverse line. The hindwings are ochreous.
