= New Buildings, New South Wales =

New Buildings New South Wales
- Coordinates: 36°58′00″S 149°33′00″E
- Population: 37 (2016 census)
- Postcode(s): 2550
- Location: 39 km (24 mi) SW of Bega
- LGA(s): Bega Valley Shire
- State electorate(s): Bega
- Federal division(s): Eden-Monaro

New Buildings is a locality of the Bega Valley Shire in New South Wales, Australia. It sits at the junction of the Towamba River and the Mataganah Creek. At the 2016 census, New Buildings had a population of 37.

== Heritage listings ==
New Buildings has a number of heritage-listed sites, including:

- New Buildings Bridge over Towamba River
