= Yowaka River bridge, Greigs Flat =

Yowaka River Bridge
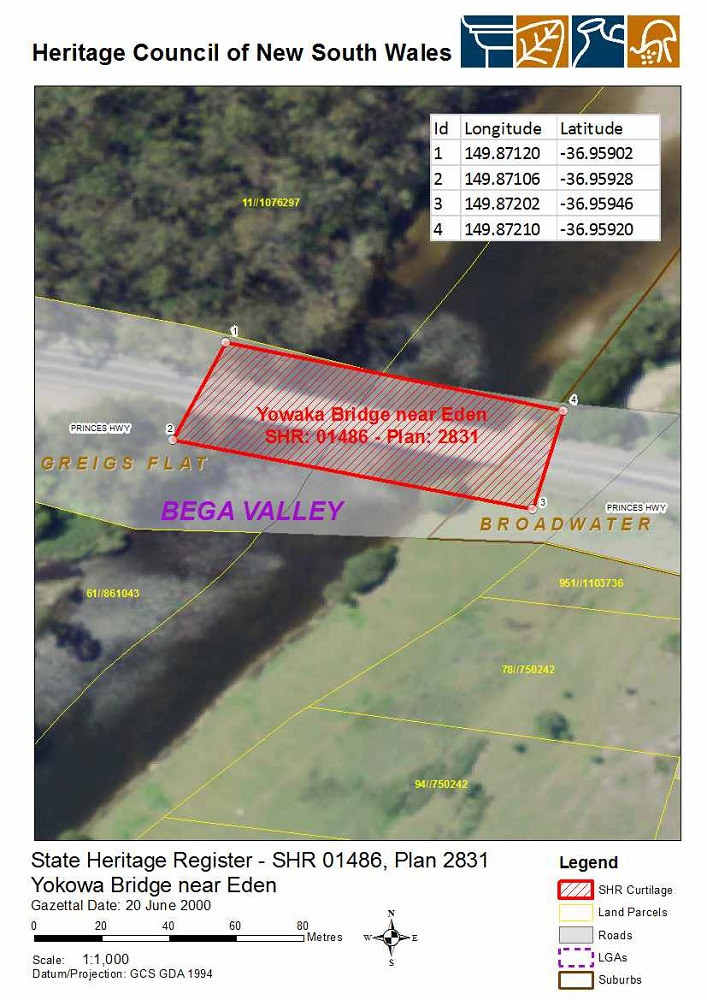
- Heritage boundaries
- Coordinates: 36°57′33″S 149°52′18″E
- Carries: Princes Highway
- Crosses: Yowaka River
- Locale: Greigs Flat, New South Wales, Australia
- Owner: Transport for NSW

Characteristics
- Design: Continuous girder bridge
- Material: Reinforced concrete
- Total length: 65.22 metres (214.0 ft)
- Longest span: 18.28 metres (60.0 ft)
- No. of spans: 4

History
- Opened: 1936
- Rebuilt: 1994
- Replaces: Saltwater Bridge

New South Wales Heritage Register
- Official name: Yowaka Bridge near Eden; Yowaka River bridge, Greigs Flat; Greigs Flat Bridge over Yowaka River
- Type: State heritage (built)
- Designated: 20 June 2000
- Reference no.: 1486
- Type: Road Bridge
- Category: Transport - Land

The Yowaka River bridge is a heritage-listed road bridge that carries the Princes Highway across the Yowaka River at Greigs Flat, New South Wales, Australia. It was built in 1936. The bridge is also known as the Yowaka Bridge near Eden. The bridge is owned by Transport for NSW. It was added to the New South Wales State Heritage Register on 20 June 2000.

== History ==
The current bridge replaced an earlier timber bridge named Saltwater Bridge. (The Yowaka River was previously known as Saltwater River). Early road construction south of Nowra was not as continuous or well planned as in the Illawarra. The majority of roads were rough bridle tracks and were privately funded. An official line was surveyed in 1859 from Merimbula to Bega. In 1864, the government extended the road from Moruya to Bega. River crossings were problematic and it was not until the 1870s that improvements on river crossings were undertaken in the form of punts or bridges. It is likely that the first Saltwater River bridge was constructed in the 1870s or 1880s. Construction of the current bridge was undertaken as part of improvements to the Princes Highway in the 1930s. It was widened in 1994 to cater for modern traffic demands by overlaying the original deck with reinforced concrete and cantilevering it to the increased width. The longitudinal beams were post-tensioned at the end spans to augment the load carrying capacity.

== Description ==
The four-span, concrete girder bridge, simply supported continuous-over-pier bridge on a 26 degree skew, is supported on three internal piers and abutments on both ends. The north end is anchored on to the abutment and the remaining supports have rocker bearings to allow movement to the bridge deck. The deck was widened in 1994. Each of the three piers consists of two octagonal columns about 2.3 metres (7 ft 7 in) from the top of the pile cap. A concrete diaphragm connects the two columns at mid-height and is approximately 1.8 metres (5 ft 11 in) high. The thickness of the diaphragms is approximately 0.32 metres (1 ft 1 in). Two of the piers are supported on caissons while the third is supported on driven piles. The overall length of the bridge is 65.22 metres (214.0 ft) with spans of 14.42 metres (47.3 ft), 18.28 metres (60.0 ft), and 14.32 metres (47.0 ft) respectively. The deck is integral with two downstand beams running the full length of the bridge. The beams are curved, with haunches at each support point. Traverse cross beams, integral with the deck span are located between the longitudinal beams at regular intervals. The reinforcement in the original concrete consists of round bars. The concrete finish to the original structure is shutter or board finished and is aesthetically laid in the soffit area and horizontal on the abutments and piers.

The bridge was reported to be in good condition as at 15 June 2005, but had been damaged by fire as a result of a fuel tanker accident in June 1999.

== Heritage listing ==
The bridge is of high state significance. It demonstrates how bridge designs evolved to address the structural capabilities or reinforced concrete compared to the traditional materials of masonry, timber and steel. It is a fine example of a continuous girder reinforced concrete bridge, a type constructed in a limited period between 1934 and World War II. It is part of the upgrade of the Princes Highway which commenced in 1924. It includes aesthetic qualities such as shuttering / formwork patterning, curved lines and a light graceful form, which addresses the construction process and structural characteristics unique to reinforced concrete. It is one of four continuous two girder reinforced concrete bridges in NSW and the only example with concrete bearings.

Yowaka Bridge near Eden was listed on the New South Wales State Heritage Register on 20 June 2000 having satisfied the following criteria.

The place is important in demonstrating the course, or pattern, of cultural or natural history in New South Wales.

Yowaka Bridge demonstrates the adoption or reinforced concrete as a relatively new material and the development of reinforced concrete bridge designs, which emerged during the late nineteenth and early twentieth centuries. Continuous girder bridges were one of the five reinforced concrete bridge types developed following the formation of the Main Roads Board in 1924. The bridge forms part of the Princes Highway and was part of the overall improvement works on the highway after the formation of the Main Roads Board.

The place is important in demonstrating aesthetic characteristics and/or a high degree of creative or technical achievement in New South Wales.

The surface form and texture created by the formwork and shutter design on the soffit, abutments and piers demonstrates that the architectural attributes of the bridge were part of the overall design and were not purely utilitarian. The level of detailing present on the soffit indicates that the architectural detailing was as important as the structural design. The subtle arches, level springings and haunches along the main beam / girder complement the structural characteristics and potential of reinforced concrete, which allowed a lighter and more graceful bridge design.

The place possesses uncommon, rare or endangered aspects of the cultural or natural history of New South Wales.

In 1999, one of four continuous two girder reinforced concrete bridges in NSW and the only example with concrete bearings. (Others are Kellys Gully Creek near Warialda Rail; Warialda Creek; Croobyar Creek)

The place is important in demonstrating the principal characteristics of a class of cultural or natural places/environments in New South Wales.

Yowaka Bridge is a fine example of a continuous reinforced concrete girder bridge. It contains all the attributes of a continuous reinforced concrete girder bridge as well as the fine architectural detailing. It is one of only ten such bridges in NSW.

== See also ==
- List of bridges in Australia
