= WOG =

WOG may refer to:

- Wog, a slang word with several meanings
- Kelsey Wog (born 1998), Canadian swimmer
- The Wog, a Native American mythical beast
- Lord Bloody Wog Rolo (1945–2007) Australian activist
- World of Giants a 1959 US TV series
- WOG (gas stations), Ukraine
- WOG (valving), "water, oil, and gas" PSI rating for valves at 100F
- Wog movement, anti-Scientologists
- wog, ISO 639-3 code for the Wogamusin language of Papua New Guinea

== See also ==
- Wog Wog, NSW, Australia
- Wog Wog River, New South Wales, Australia
- Wog Wog Mountain, in the Budawang Range, New South Wales, Australia
