= Frogs Hollow, New South Wales =

Locality in New South Wales, Australia

Coordinates: 36.765°S 149.814°E

Frogs Hollow is a locality in New South Wales, Australia. It is located on the Princes Highway, 13 km south of Bega and 19 km north of Merimbula. It is home to Majestic Motorhomes, Frogs Hollow Airfield, and a Go-kart track.

Its population is not reported separately in the Census; it is included in the statistical area of "Kanoona".
