= Eochrois cuphosema =

Scientific classification
- Kingdom: Animalia
- Phylum: Arthropoda
- Class: Insecta
- Order: Lepidoptera
- Family: Oecophoridae
- Genus: Eochrois
- Species: E. cuphosema

Binomial name
- Eochrois cuphosema (Turner, 1946)

Synonyms
- Machimia cuphosema Turner, 1946

Species of moth

Eochrois cuphosema is a moth in the family Oecophoridae. It was described by Alfred Jefferis Turner in 1946. It is found in Australia, where it has been recorded from Queensland.

The wingspan is about 20 mm. The forewings are ochreous-whitish with slender fuscous markings and an oblique line from two-fifths of the costa half across the wing and an oblique line from two-thirds of the costa, angled inwards beneath the middle to two-thirds of the dorsum. There is also an irregularly dentate subterminal line and an interrupted terminal line. The hindwings are whitish.
