= Eochrois hebes =

Scientific classification
- Kingdom: Animalia
- Phylum: Arthropoda
- Class: Insecta
- Order: Lepidoptera
- Family: Oecophoridae
- Genus: Eochrois
- Species: E. hebes

Binomial name
- Eochrois hebes (Turner, 1946)

Synonyms
- Machimia hebes Turner, 1946

Species of moth

Eochrois hebes is a moth in the family Oecophoridae. It was described by Alfred Jefferis Turner in 1946. It is found in Australia, where it has been recorded from South Australia.

The wingspan is about 22 mm. The forewings are whitish with patchy grey and fuscous suffusion, as well as a suffused triangle on the dorsum, its apex reaching above the fold. There is some undefined suffusion about the base and apex and the stigmata is fuscous, the first discal dot at one-third, the second at three-fifths and the plical lost in the apex of the dorsal triangle. The hindwings are pale ochreous with slight grey suffusion at the apex.
