= Anna Glynn =

Australian artist

Anna Glynn is an Australian visual artist whose diverse work spans the mediums of painting, drawing, installation, moving image, sound and sculpture. Her works have been shown in multiple exhibitions and are represented in the collections of numerous public galleries.

== Early life and biography ==
Anna Glynn grew up on a one-hundred-acre Yarra riverfront farm at Warrandyte on a property with important wildlife habitat now owned by Parks Victoria. This bushland location formed the basis for a creative childhood interacting with nature and has influenced the subject matter of her work including her 2006 Strange Memories, featured on ABC Radio in 2011.

In 1980, Glynn graduated from Melbourne State College, University of Melbourne with a Bachelor of Education majoring in sculpture and painting.

== Art practice and career ==
Glynn's artworks feature explorations of nature and the environment, and the human connection to landscape.

Her exhibition Promiscuous Provenance, commissioned by Shoalhaven Regional Gallery, explored Australia's colonial identity through a contemporary reinterpretation of early representations of Australian flora and fauna. It toured multiple museums and galleries across Queensland, New South Wales, ACT, Victoria and South Australia from 2018 to 2021, supported by the Australian Government's Visions of Australia touring program.

Throughout her career of more than thirty years, Glynn has been a finalist in a number of art prizes and has won awards and commissions both in Australia and internationally, including the Noosa Art Award (2016), Kedumba Drawing Award (2015), the Shoalhaven City Arts Award (2001), and the Shoalhaven Arts Board Millennium Sculpture commission (2000).

== Recognition and awards ==
- 2021 - Finalist, FLOW, National Contemporary Watercolour Prize, Wollongong Art Gallery, NSW
- 2021 - Finalist, Gosford Art Prize, Gosford Regional Gallery, NSW
- 2021 - Finalist, Stanthorpe Photography Awards, Stanthorpe Regional Art Gallery, QLD
- 2020 - Finalist, Heysen Prize for Landscape, Hahndorf Academy, SA
- 2020 - Finalist, Elaine Bermingham National Watercolour Prize in Landscape Painting, Webb Gallery, Griffith University, QLD
- 2019 - Finalist, Ravenswood Australian Women's Art Prize, NSW

== Exhibitions ==
=== Selected solo exhibitions ===
2018–2021 - Promiscuous Provenance, touring exhibition: Shoalhaven Regional Gallery, NSW; Margaret Whitlam Gallery, NSW; Noosa Regional Gallery, QLD; The World Theatre, QLD; Basil Sellers Exhibition Centre, NSW; Australian National Botanic Gardens, ACT; Hahndorf Academy, SA; Swan Hill Regional Gallery, VIC; Jervis Bay Maritime Museum, NSW; Hawkesbury Regional Gallery, NSW.

2013 - Wonderment, Leung Fong Oi Wan Art Gallery, Lingnan University, Hong Kong.

== Collections ==
In 2021 her moving image works were acquired by the National Museum of Australia, Canberra and the Australian Parliament House Art Collection, both in Canberra.

Other galleries holding her works include:

- Shoalhaven City Council Art Collection, NSW
- Broken Hill Regional Art Gallery, NSW
- Bundanon Trust Collection, NSW
