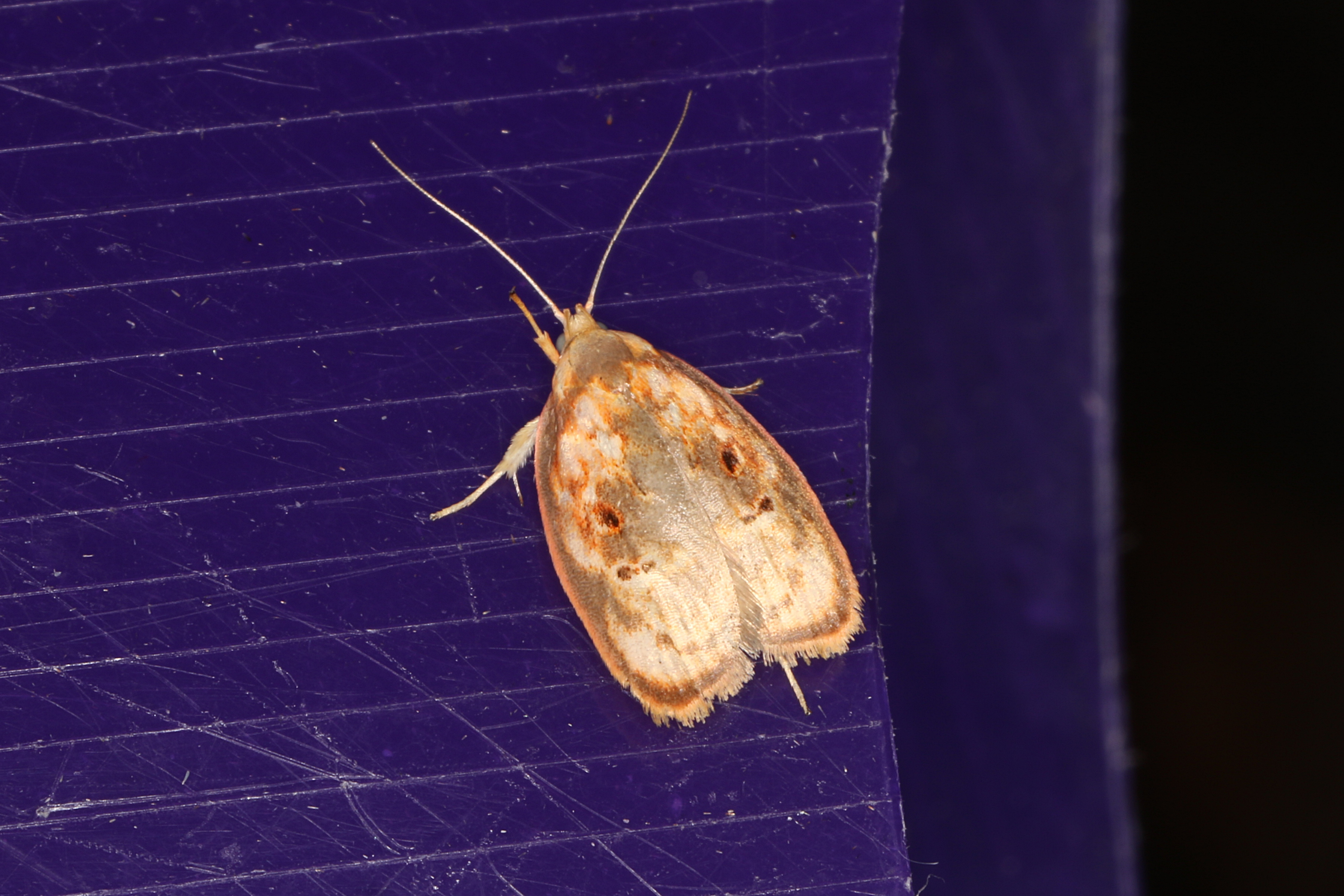
- Eochrois sarcoxantha

Scientific classification
- Kingdom: Animalia
- Phylum: Arthropoda
- Class: Insecta
- Order: Lepidoptera
- Family: Oecophoridae
- Subfamily: Oecophorinae
- Genus: Eochrois; Meyrick, 1886

Species
- See text.

Synonyms
- Eochroa Meyrick, 1883 (preocc. Felder & Rogenhofer, 1874); Crypsynarthra Lower, 1901

= Eochrois =

Genus of moths

Eochrois is a genus of moths of the family Oecophoridae.

== Species ==
- Eochrois acutella (Walker, 1864)
- Eochrois aetopis (Meyrick, 1889)
- Eochrois anaemica (Turner, 1916)
- Eochrois anthophora (Turner, 1944)
- Eochrois argyraspis (Lower, 1897)
- Eochrois atypa (Turner, 1946)
- Eochrois callianassa (Meyrick, 1883)
- Eochrois caminias (Meyrick, 1889)
- Eochrois chrysias (Lower, 1901)
- Eochrois cuphosema (Turner, 1946)
- Eochrois cycnodes (Meyrick, 1889)
- Eochrois dejunctella (Walker, 1864)
- Eochrois ebenosticha (Turner, 1917)
- Eochrois epidesma (Meyrick, 1886)
- Eochrois epitoxa (Meyrick, 1889)
- Eochrois hebes (Turner, 1946)
- Eochrois holarga (Turner, 1936)
- Eochrois holochra (Turner, 1946)
- Eochrois leiochroa Lower, 1907
- Eochrois leucocrossa (Meyrick, 1889)
- Eochrois malacopis (Meyrick, 1889)
- Eochrois mesodesma Lower, 1898
- Eochrois monophaes (Meyrick, 1884)
- Eochrois pandora (Turner, 1917)
- Eochrois phoenopis (Turner, 1940)
- Eochrois platyphaea (Turner, 1939)
- Eochrois pulverulenta (Meyrick, 1883)
- Eochrois rubrilinea (Turner, 1947)
- Eochrois sarcoxantha (Lower, 1893)
- Eochrois trisema Lower, 1907
