= Rocky Hall, New South Wales =

Rocky Hall
- Suburb
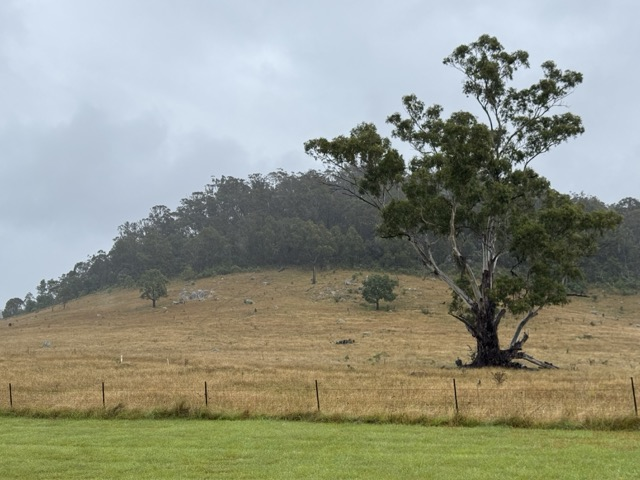

- Coordinates: 36.93°S 149.50°E
- Country: Australia
- State: New South Wales
- LGA: Bega Valley Shire

Government
  - State electorate: Bega
  - Federal division: Eden-Monaro
- Postcode: 2550

Rocky Hall is a locality in the Bega Valley Shire of New South Wales, Australia. At the 2021 census, it had a population of 53 people with a median age of 59 years.

== History ==
A school was constructed in 1887, with the schoolhouse containing five rooms, a kitchen, and a pantry, and a large schoolroom on two acres of land. The building is currently occupied by a preschool.

A butter factory was closed in 1923, presumably operated by the Rocky Hall Dairy Co following an attempt to amalgamate a number of nearby butter factories.

== Facilities ==
A small cemetery is located in Rocky Hall on Cemetery Road, with an estimated capacity of 56 years remaining as of 2020.

A heritage-listed community hall built in 1935 on Big Jack Mountain Road is operated by Bega Valley Shire Council, with a total capacity of 60 people. It doubles as a Neighbourhood Safer Place.

A Telstra payphone is located opposite the community hall.

Satellite internet through Sky Muster was enabled in 2011 as part of the National Broadband Network rollout.

There is a community association called the Rocky Hall Community Association Incorporated which was registered in 2022.

== Media ==
A photo book called Rocky Hall NSW up against the elements: summer 2019/2020 which documents the 2019–20 Australian bushfire season and its impacts on Rocky Hall was published by the association and launched on 25 February 2023. It was supported with grants from the Society of Saint Vincent de Paul and Bega Valley Shire Council.
