= Eochrois anaemica =

Scientific classification
- Kingdom: Animalia
- Phylum: Arthropoda
- Class: Insecta
- Order: Lepidoptera
- Family: Oecophoridae
- Genus: Eochrois
- Species: E. anaemica

Binomial name
- Eochrois anaemica (Turner, 1916)

Synonyms
- Machimia anaemica Turner, 1916

Species of moth

Eochrois anaemica is a moth in the family Oecophoridae. It was described by Alfred Jefferis Turner in 1916. It is found in Australia, where it has been recorded from Queensland.

The wingspan is 12–14 mm. The forewings are ochreous-whitish, with very fine, sparse, fuscous irroration and a fuscous, discal dot at one-third, a second beneath and beyond it on the fold, and a third at two-third. The hindwings are whitish.
