= Edrom, New South Wales =

Edrom New South Wales
- Coordinates: 37°08′19″S 149°57′10″E
- Population: 0 (2016 census)
- Postcode(s): 2551
- Location: 9 km (6 mi) SE of Eden
- LGA(s): Bega Valley Shire
- State electorate(s): Bega
- Federal division(s): Eden-Monaro

Edrom is a locality in the Bega Valley Shire of New South Wales, Australia. Much of the area is within Beowa National Park.

At the 2016 census, Edrom had a population of zero.

== Heritage listings ==
Edrom has a number of heritage-listed sites, including:

- Davidson Whaling Station
