= Greigs Flat, New South Wales =

Greigs Flat New South Wales
- Coordinates: 36°58′00″S 149°52′00″E
- Population: 151 (2016 census)
- Postcode(s): 2549
- Location: 11 km (7 mi) NW of Eden
- LGA(s): Bega Valley Shire
- State electorate(s): Bega
- Federal division(s): Eden-Monaro

Greigs Flat is a locality in the Bega Valley Shire of New South Wales, Australia. At the 2016 census, Greigs Flat had a population of 151.

Greigs Flat Public School opened in November 1869 and closed in December 1951. It was half-time with the school at Lochiel until January 1873, a provisional school from February to December 1888, and a public school from January 1889 to February 1944 and from November 1946 to December 1951. It was known as Yowaka Public School after 1942. Politician Francis Bland attended the school as a child.

== Heritage listings ==
Greigs Flat has a number of heritage-listed sites, including:

- Princes Highway: Greigs Flat Bridge over Yowaka River
