= Conjola National Park =

Australian national park

- IUCN category II (national park)
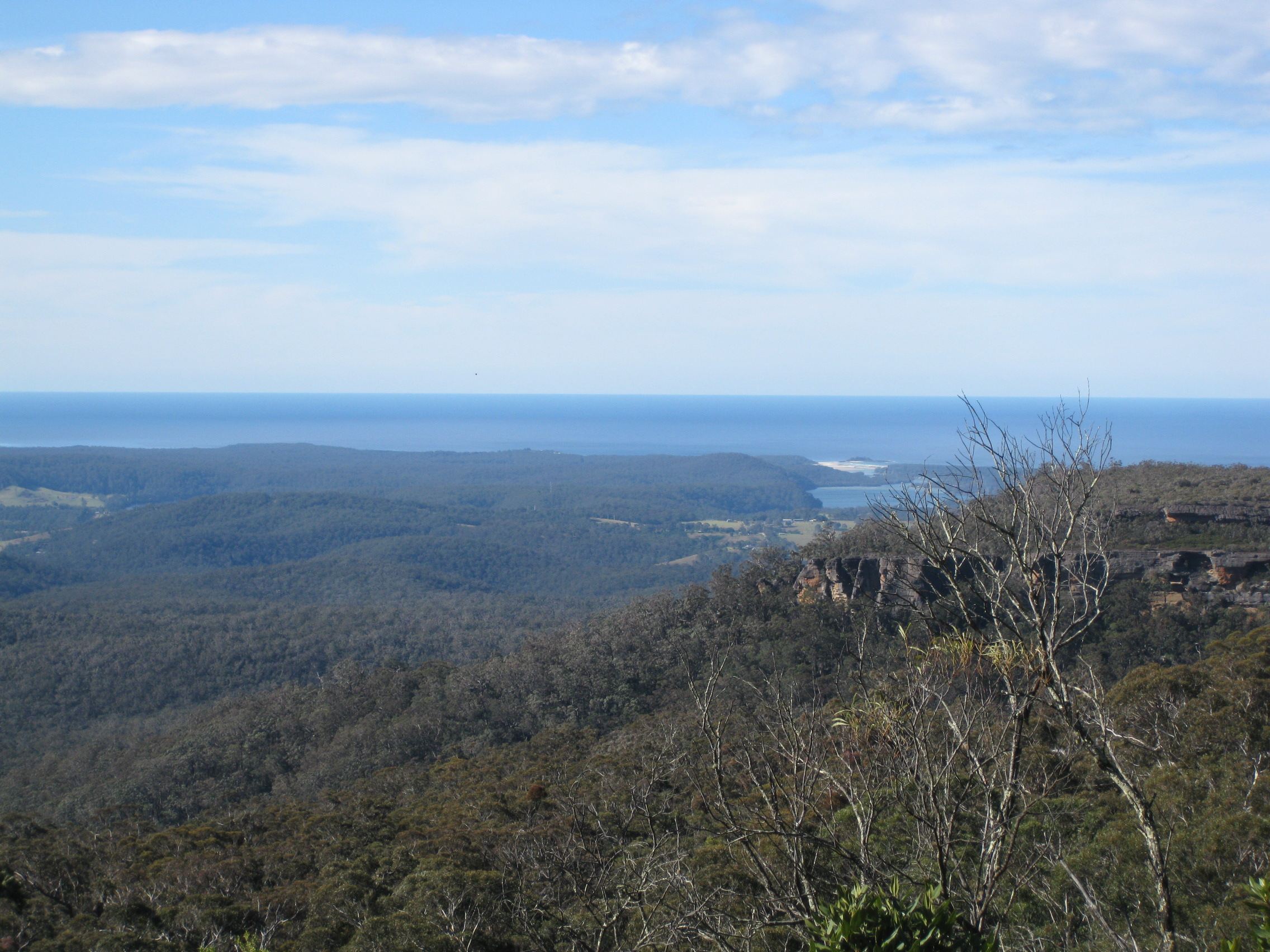
- View from the lookout

- Location within New South Wales
- Location: New South Wales
- Coordinates: 35°14′57″S 150°28′33″E
- Area: 10 km^{2} (3.9 sq mi)
- Established: 1994
- Governing body: NSW National Parks and Wildlife Service
- Website: http://www.nationalparks.nsw.gov.au

Conjola National Park covers 11,060 hectares and lies on the mid south coast of New South Wales, Australia, between Sussex Inlet and Lake Conjola, 165 km southwest of Sydney.

== Flora ==
Conjola National Park is home to 18 distinct plant communities including 4 that are endangered due to urban development on the east coast of Australia. The national park is listed as being a biodiversity hotspot containing 429 species although this number is likely to rise due to further surveying of the area. Of these species 5 are threatened they include the endangered Wilsonia rotundifolia, vulnerable Wilsonia backhousia, Syzygium paniculatum, Cryptostylis hunteriana and Galium australe which was believed to be extinct in New South Wales. A further 8 significant species occur in the park, along with Grevillea macleayana and Pultenaea villifera which are on the national register of rare or threatened Australian plants. At least thirty-five terrestrial and epiphytic orchid species occur in the park.

== Fauna ==
Due to the great diversity of the plant world, many species of birds and wild animals can be found here. Eastern grey kangaroos and echidnas are common, but the favourite resident of park visitors is the noisy yellow-tailed black cockatoo (Zanda funerea).

== Geology ==
The underlying geology of the park is mainly composed of the Permian Conjola formation, a series of sandstone and shale units. This is overlain by large areas of Wandrawandian Siltstone around Swan Lake. There is areas of sandstone that outcrop around Berringer Lake and West of the park. There is a sandstone shelf located approximately 30 cm under the surface of the water in Berringer lake that extenders approximately 1 metre under the surface before dropping to a depth of 8–15 metres.

== Aboriginal heritage ==
Conjola National Park has been home to both the Budawang and Yunin people for approximately 6000 years. Aboriginal artefacts in the area include rock shelters, midden and campsite. In the middens mussels and oysters can be found. Axe grinding grooves can be found in sandstone outcrops.

== See also ==
- Protected areas of New South Wales
