= Tura Beach, New South Wales =

Tura Beach
- Town
- Coordinates: 36°51′00″S 149°55′30″E
- Country: Australia
- State: New South Wales
- LGA: Bega Valley Shire
- Location: 6 km (3.7 mi) N of Merimbula; 350 km (220 mi) S of Sydney; 450 km (280 mi) E of Melbourne

Government
  - State electorate: Bega
  - Federal division: Eden-Monaro

Population
  - Total: 3,405 (2021 census)
- Postcode: 2548

Tura Beach is a suburb of Merimbula, on the South Coast of New South Wales, Australia, in the Bega Valley Shire local government area. It lies approximately 6 km north of Merimbula. At the 2016 census, Tura Beach had a population of 3,158 people with a median age of 57 years, 19 years greater than that of the overall Australian population.

Tura Beach was originally developed by AVJennings in the early 1980s and was the first purpose-built integrated golf course and housing development in Australia.

The Tura Beach Country Club is set high on a coastal hill overlooking the golf course, headland and ocean. It is home to both men's and ladies' golf clubs, men's and women's bowling clubs and the Tura Beach Tennis Club. Much of the course is surrounded by natural bushland.

The original Tura Beach Shopping Centre is located at the corner of Tura Beach Drive and Golf Circuit. It currently accommodates a Chinese restaurant, bakery, bridge club, garden centre, gymnasium, hairdresser salon, op shop, pool and spa shop, Tura Marrang Library and Community Centre and the U3A centre for the Merimbula area. A medical centre is located near the shopping centre along Golf Circuit. Sanananda Park Retirement Village accommodates up to 66 people and is located opposite the shopping centre on Tura Beach Drive.

In addition to the original shopping centre, a new Tura Beach Shopping Centre was opened in 2010 at the intersection of Sapphire Coast Drive and Tura Beach Drive.

The Tura Beach Flora Reserve is located at the corner of Nolan Drive and High Crescent. The Flora Reserve was established in 1992 to ensure that a small remnant of the coastal environment would be preserved as the area north of Merimbula began to transform due to residential development. The Reserve is representative of typical open Eucalypt forest on sandy coastal soil. The sub-canopy comprises a mixed stand of casuarinas, banksias, acacias and hakeas with mixed stands of ti-tree and paperbark in moist areas. There is a diverse understory of heathland shrubs, herbs and grasses including several species of regional interest, most notably the Merimbula Starhair (Astrotricha Wallagaraugh) which is listed as an endangered species in NSW. Management of the Reserve is carried out by a Council-appointed committee of local residents.
