= Eochrois holochra =

Scientific classification
- Kingdom: Animalia
- Phylum: Arthropoda
- Class: Insecta
- Order: Lepidoptera
- Family: Oecophoridae
- Genus: Eochrois
- Species: E. holochra

Binomial name
- Eochrois holochra (Turner, 1946)

Synonyms
- Machimia holochra Turner, 1946

Species of moth

Eochrois holochra is a moth in the family Oecophoridae. It was described by Alfred Jefferis Turner in 1946. It is found in Australia, where it has been recorded from Western Australia.

The wingspan is 18–22 mm. The forewings are ochreous-whitish, the dots and slight irroration fuscous. The stigmata is minute or partly obsolete, the first discal dot is found at one-third, the plical beyond it and the second discal at three-fifths. There is a very fine outwardly oblique line from two-thirds of the costa, angled in the disc, and then subterminal to the tornus. The hindwings are whitish.
