= Towamba, New South Wales =

Towamba
- Town
- The Towamba River, which flows through the town

- Coordinates: 37°05′S 149°41′E
- Country: Australia
- State: New South Wales
- LGA: Bega Valley Shire

Government
  - State electorate: Bega
  - Federal division: Eden-Monaro

Population
  - Total: 249 (2021 census)
- Postcode: 2550

Towamba is a locality and village in New South Wales, Australia, situated in Bega Valley Shire. It is located next to the Towamba River, forty minutes west of Eden. At the 2021 census, Towamba had a population of 249 people.

Along with settlements such as Burragate, Pericoe, Rocky Hall and Kiah, Towamba was one of the settlements established after Benjamin Boyd began to open up the area to European settlement in the 1840s and 1850s.

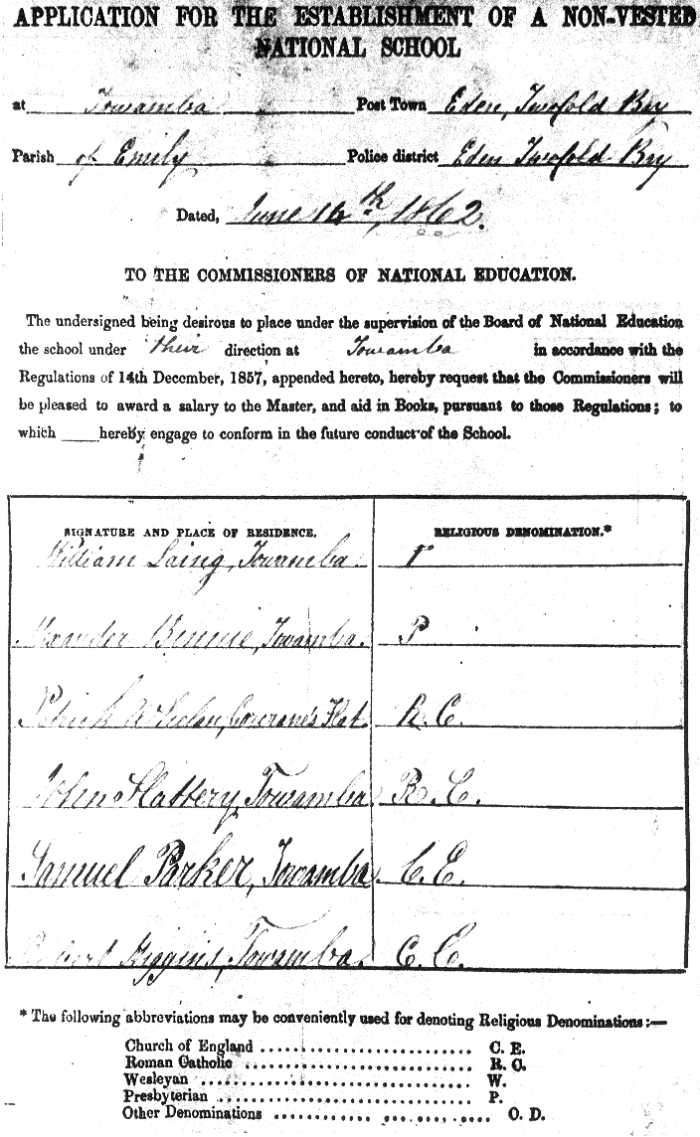
School Application

This small community has had a public school since 1862, located in Towamba Street. The original ford crossing the Towamba River was opposite the old police station, now a private dwelling. The first bridge built across the river was swept away in the 1919 floods, when every bridge on the river was swept away.

Like many river systems throughout the Australian outback, the Towamba River is prone to extremes. When it floods it completely cuts off the village of Towamba from the outside world.

Towamba remains a small service centre for the neighbouring agricultural community.

Towamba Hall is a mud brick building located in the isolated rural community of Towamba. This venue can cater for a whole range of events with the Towamba oval right next door. Towamba's former general store building is remnant of the old gold-mining village of Yambulla. It was relocated to Towamba, in 1914, and served as a general store into the 1940s; it is now used as a residence. The village has a cemetery.

Towamba also has its own radio station run by local volunteers.
