= Wyndham, New South Wales =

Wyndham
- Town
- Coordinates: 36°55′45″S 149°38′46″E
- Country: Australia
- State: New South Wales
- LGA: Bega Valley Shire

Government
  - Federal division: Eden-Monaro

Population
  - Total: 418 (SAL 2021)
- Postcode: 2550

Wyndham is a locality and village located 519 km (322 mi) south of Sydney, in the South Coast region of New South Wales, Australia in the Bega Valley Shire. At the 2021 census, the locality of Wyndham had a population of 418, an increase from 386 at the 2016 census.

Nearby towns and villages include Pambula, Candelo, Towamba, and Cathcart.

== History ==
Like much of Bega Valley Shire, the village of Wyndham is located on the traditional lands of the Yuin nation.

European presence in the Wyndham area dates back the early 1850s after gold was reportedly discovered nearby. Land for a village at Wyndham was first set aside in 1856.

== Facilities ==
Wyndham General Store (also Post Office, service station, cafe), Wyndham primary school, Wyndham School of Arts Hall, Uniting Church Hall, Sports Ground, Stringy bark centre, Ultraviolet treated water.

== Surrounds ==
Wyndham has a stunning backdrop of Jingera rock, a sheer granite rock face.

== Events ==
School of Arts Hall Wyndham Village Markets, annual art show, annual ballet performance, ballet lessons

Stringy Bark Centre yoga classes, massage and natural therapies

== Wyndham Village Markets ==
Wyndham Village Markets are held on the fourth Sunday of each month in the School Of Arts Hall, with a range of crafts, foods, and often tools.

== See also ==
- Bega, New South Wales
