= Bega Valley Arts and Crafts Society =

The Bega Valley Arts and Crafts Society is a body created for and run by visual arts practitioners based in the Bega Valley Shire. The body was originally called the Bega Valley Fine Arts and Crafts Society when it was founded in 1946 by three local artists, Jack Roy Kirkland, Silby McNeil, Charles Deacon and a friend of the society, founder of the Bega District News, WB 'Curly' Annabel.

== Formation of the society ==
The BVACS was the first arts society to be established in NSW outside of Sydney. The first meeting of the society was called by Silby McNeil for November 13, 1946 to discuss holding an exhibition of local paintings the following month. The meeting went on to resolve the motion of Jack Kirkland, 'to form a society for the encouragement and cultivation of artistic works of a cultural nature'. A further motion resolved that 'the society be known as the Bega Valley Fine Arts and Crafts Society'.

Original elected office bearers for the society were:

- Patron Mr W H Balmain
- President Mr S McNeil
- Vice Presidents Mr JR Kirkland, Mr W Birnall and Mr F Newtown
- Secretary Mr CH Deacon
- Treasurer Miss R Scott
- Publicity Officer Mr WB Annabel

The first of the traditional annual exhibition of the society was planned for December 1946 to be held at the Balmain Motors showrooms. The director of the National Gallery of NSW, Hal Missingham offered support to the new society through advice on drawing up a formal constitution and by laws, which were adopted after the first annual general meeting of the society in 1947. The society's objectives in 1947 were twofold - first, 'to create and develop public interest in fine arts and secondly, to promote exhibitions of a cultural nature and to encourage the practice of fine arts.'

The BVACS had, from its earliest days, strong links with the Royal Art Society of NSW which assisted the BVACS with defining its artistic direction, and as a source of respected tutors and critics. In 1950, three members of the BVACS were made associate members of the RASNSW, after being nominated by painter James R Jackson who had accompanied the artists on painting excursions in the Bega district.

Despite its artistic success, the society still had to assert itself locally for official recognition. 1960 it repeatedly requested council to supply signs directing visitors to its gallery, to no avail. The society also had to approach council requesting representation at civic functions when the local bodies and clubs were automatically included.

== The Caltex Art Award ==
In 1961 the Caltex Oil Company became the sponsor of a local art award.
