= Wonboyn, New South Wales =

Wonboyn
- Town
- Coordinates: 37°15′S 149°55′E
- Country: Australia
- State: New South Wales
- LGA: Bega Valley Shire

Government
  - Federal division: Eden-Monaro

Population
  - Total: 130 (2021 census)
- Postcode: 2551

Wonboyn is a locality in New South Wales, Australia in Bega Valley Shire. The village of Wonboyn Lake is situated within the locality, near the lake of the same name. At the 2021 census, Wonboyn had a population of 130. It is the southernmost village in New South Wales.

Wonboyn is known for its oyster industry, which first developed in the early 20th century. Commercial fishing also took place in the area. Surrounded by bush, Wonboyn is also a tourist destination, catering to fishermen and campers. Wonboyn Cabins and Caravan Park provides year-round accommodation in a rural setting with access to the lake, its boat ramps, National Forest Preserves and beaches within just a few kilometres.

Wonboyn Lake was severely affected by the January 2020 bushfires, with many homes in the village destroyed. The local economy, reliant on oyster farming and tourism, suffered negative impacts from the fires and the COVID-19 pandemic later that year.
