= Pultenaea villifera =

Scientific classification
- Kingdom: Plantae
- Clade: Tracheophytes
- Clade: Angiosperms
- Clade: Eudicots
- Clade: Rosids
- Order: Fabales
- Family: Fabaceae
- Subfamily: Faboideae
- Genus: Pultenaea
- Species: P. villifera

Binomial name
- Pultenaea villifera Sieber ex DC.

Species of plant

Pultenaea villifera is a species of flowering plant in the family Fabaceae and is endemic to two disjunct areas of Australia. It is an erect to prostrate shrub with triangular to linear, egg-shaped to elliptic leaves and yellow and red, pea-like flowers.

== Description ==
There are two varieties of Pultenaea villifera - var. villifera that is endemic to New South Wales and var. glabrescens that is endemic to Kangaroo Island in South Australia.

=== Pultenaea villifera var. villifera ===
Pultenaea villifera var. villifera is an erect to prostrate shrub that typically grows to a height of 1–2 m (3 ft 3 in – 6 ft 7 in) and has hairy branchlets. The leaves are arranged alternately, triangular to linear, egg-shaped to elliptic, 11–19 mm (0.43–0.75 in) long and 2.6–5 mm (0.10–0.20 in) wide with stipules 2–7 mm (0.079–0.276 in) long pressed against the stem at the base. The flowers are 10–12 mm (0.39–0.47 in) long and usually arranged singly at the ends of branches on a pedicel about 1 mm (0.039 in) long with linear or egg-shaped bracteoles 2.7–6 mm (0.11–0.24 in) long attached to the base of the sepal tube. The sepals are 3–7 mm (0.12–0.28 in) long, the standard petal is yellow to orange with red lines and 8.0–13.5 mm (0.31–0.53 in) long, the wings yellow to orange and 9–10 mm (0.35–0.39 in) long, and the keel yellow to red and 7–10 mm (0.28–0.39 in) long. Flowering mainly occurs from July to December and the fruit is an inflated pod 5–6 mm (0.20–0.24 in) long.

=== Pultenaea villifera var. glabrescens ===
Pultenaea villifera var. glabrescens, commonly known as yellow bush-pea, is an erect to prostrate shrub that typically grows to a height of 1–2 m (3 ft 3 in – 6 ft 7 in) and has glabrous or only sparsely hairy branchlets. The leaves are arranged alternately, triangular to linear, egg-shaped to elliptic, 14–26 mm (0.55–1.02 in) long and 5–9 mm (0.20–0.35 in) wide with stipules 2–5 mm (0.079–0.197 in) long pressed against the stem at the base. The flowers are 10–12 mm (0.39–0.47 in) long and usually arranged singly at the ends of branches with lance-shaped bracteoles about 3 mm (0.12 in) long attached to the base of the sepal tube. The sepals are 4–6 mm (0.16–0.24 in) long, the standard petal more or less round, yellow to orange with red lines and 6.5–10 mm (0.26–0.39 in) long, the wings yellow to orange and 7–9 mm (0.28–0.35 in) long, and the keel red and 7–9 mm (0.28–0.35 in) long. Flowering occurs from October and December and the fruit is an inflated pod 6.0–7.5 mm (0.24–0.30 in) long.

== Taxonomy ==
Pultenaea villifera was first formally described in 1825 by Augustin Pyramus de Candolle in Prodromus Systematis Naturalis Regni Vegetabilis from an unpublished description by Franz Sieber.

In 1923, John McConnell Black described two varieties in Transactions and proceedings of the Royal Society of South Australia and the names are accepted by the Australian Plant Census:

- Pultenaea villifera var. glabrescens J.M.Black
- Pultenaea villifera Sieber ex DC. var. villifera

== Distribution and habitat ==
Pultenaea villifera var. glabrescens in endemic to the north coast of Kangaroo Island where it grows in woodland, heath and grassland and var. villifera grows in forest in New South Wales between the lower Blue Mountains and Eden.
