= Wog Wog River =

Coordinates: 37°03′S 149°38′E

Location
- Country: Australia
- State: New South Wales
- Region: South East Corner (IBRA), South Coast
- Local government area: Bega Valley

Physical characteristics
- Source: White Rock Mountain
  - location: southeast of Bombala
  - elevation: 1,030 m (3,380 ft)
- Mouth: confluence with the Towamba River
  - location: South East Forest National Park
  - elevation: 77 m (253 ft)
- Length: 34 km (21 mi)

Basin features
- River system: Towamba River catchment
- Tributaries
  - right: Wog Wog Creek, Letts Creek
- National park: South East Forest NP

The Wog Wog River is a perennial river of the Towamba River catchment, located in the South Coast region of New South Wales, Australia.

== Course and features ==
The Wog Wog River rises below White Rock Mountain, south southeast of Bombala and flows generally south southeast, northeast, and then east, joined by two minor tributaries before reaching its confluence with the Towamba River in remote country within South East Forest National Park. The river descends 949 metres (3,114 ft) over its 34 kilometres (21 mi) course.

== See also ==
- Rivers of New South Wales
- List of rivers of New South Wales (L–Z)
- List of rivers of Australia
