= Shoalhaven Regional Gallery =

Art gallery in Nowra, NSW

Coordinates: 34.8735°S 150.6010°E

Shoalhaven Regional Gallery is an art gallery in Nowra, New South Wales.

== History ==
The Shoalhaven Regional Gallery is located in the centre of Nowra, NSW and is administered by the Shoalhaven City Council. The gallery was previously known as the Shoalhaven City Arts Centre & Regional Gallery and was refurbished by the Shoalhaven City Council. The group, Arts Shoalhaven worked determinedly since 1989 until 2004 to see the Shoalhaven Arts Centre become a reality. Funding for this came from the NSW Ministry of the Arts and the Australian Government Regional Partnership Program. The gallery was officially opened on 28 February 2004 by the mayor of the Shoalhaven, Councillor Greg Watson, accompanied by Senator Rod Kemp (Federal Minister for the Arts) and Councillor John Anderson (Chairperson of Shoalhaven Arts Board and Assistant Deputy Mayor).

== The collection ==
The Shoalhaven Regional Gallery collection was established over 40 years ago and includes works by important Australian artists. There is a strong regional and Shoalhaven representation which includes late colonial watercolours, oils and photographs of the Shoalhaven area by Samuel Elyard. Artists in the collection include Margaret Woodward, Euan Macleod, Judy Cassab, Guy Warren, Max Dupain, and Max Dingle Yvonne Langshaw.

== Selected exhibitions ==
Their exhibition program features both contemporary and traditional works and a diverse range of touring exhibitions by leading Australian and Shoalhaven artists, community-based exhibitions, and works from the Shoalhaven City Art Collection. Exhibitions change every six to eight weeks.

In 2021 the Spaces in Between exhibition curated by Max Dingle OAM featured Virginia Coventry & Jan King. Jan King is known for her sculptures made from waxed and painted steel and Virginia Coventry’s work explores relationships between light, spatiality and colour. Both artists have exhibited widely throughout Australia and overseas, and their works are included in a number of important public and private collections.

The exhibition" 2020 WONDER + DREAD" featured iconic Australian artists Arthur Boyd, Max Dupain, Sidney Nolan, Lloyd Rees, Albert Tucker and many other well known artists including: Glenn Barkly, Sam Byrne, Samuel Elyard, Helga Groves, Rosemary Laing, Marcia Macmillan, Aunty Deidre Martin & Nicole Monks, Alan McFetridge, Joseph McGlennon, Lara Merrett, Susan Norrie, Michael Riley, Cameron Robbins, Luke Shadbolt and William Strutt.

The gallery holds the Shoalhaven Mental Health Fellowship – Open Art Competition which is a Shoalhaven Mental Health Fellowship biennial open art competition. The exhibition helps to raise awareness of mental health and illness in the Shoalhaven region

The 2020 exhibition, "the TERRA within", curated by Warwick Keen was a major exhibition addressing the impacts of the past 250 years of colonisation and celebrated the survival of the oldest living culture in the world. The exhibition featured artworks by more than 30 Indigenous artists including Karla Dickens, Fiona Foley, Emily Kame Kngwarreye and Christian Thompson.

The touring exhibition "Promiscuous Provenance", by Australian artist Anna Glynn, was commissioned by the Shoalhaven Regional Gallery and toured to multiple galleries in Queensland, New South Wales, Australian Capital Territory, Victoria, and South Australia from 2018 to 2021. A documentary produced by Anna Thompson explores the development of the exhibition, ANNA GLYNN: The artist behind 'Promiscuous Provenance'.
