= Towamba River =

Coordinates: 37°06′S 149°54′E

Towamba River Kiah River

Location
- Country: Australia
- State: New South Wales
- Region: South Eastern Highlands (IBRA), South Coast
- Municipality: Bega Valley

Physical characteristics
- Source: South Coast Range, Great Dividing Range
  - location: near Coolangubra Mountain
  - elevation: 533 m (1,749 ft)
- Mouth: Tasman Sea, South Pacific Ocean
  - location: Nullica Bay, Twofold Bay
- Length: 86 km (53 mi)
- Basin size: 1,026 km^{2} (396 sq mi)
- Depth
  - average: 1.1 m (3 ft 7 in)

Basin features
- Tributaries
  - left: Back Creek (Bega Valley, New South Wales), New Station Creek, Mataganah Creek, Stony Creek (Towamba River), Jingo Creek
  - right: Basin Creek, Reedy Creek (Bega Valley, New South Wales), Wog Wog River, Pericoe Creek, Camping Ground Creek, Stanleys Creek, Shelleys Creek

The Towamba River is a perennial river which transitions to an open mature wave dominated barrier estuary, located in the South Coast region of New South Wales, Australia.

== Course and features ==
The Towamba River rises near Coolangubra Mountain, below Mount Marshall on the eastern slopes of the South Coast Range, part of the Great Dividing Range, approximately 9 kilometres (5.6 mi) north of Coolangubra Mountain. The river flows generally southeast and then northeast, joined by twelve tributaries including the Mataganah Creek and Wog Wog River. Its mouth, east of Boydtown, is a barrier estuary known as Kiah Inlet, which empties into Nullica Bay, the southern bight of Twofold Bay in the Tasman Sea. The river descends 533 metres (1,749 ft) over its 86 kilometres (53 mi) course.

The catchment area of the river is 1,026 square kilometres (396 sq mi) with a volume of 2,050 megalitres (72×10^{6} cu ft) over a surface area of 2.0 square kilometres (0.77 sq mi), at an average depth of 1.1 metres (3 ft 7 in).

At the locality of Kiah, the Princes Highway crosses the Towamba River.

The river flows through extensive parts of the South East Forest National Park in its upper reaches. In its lower reaches, the river forms the northern boundary of Mount Imlay National Park.

== See also ==
- Towamba River bridge, New Buildings
- List of rivers of Australia
- List of rivers of New South Wales (L–Z)
- Rivers of New South Wales
