= Merimbula =

- Town
- Coordinates: 36°53′53″S 149°54′04″E
- Country: Australia
- State: New South Wales
- LGA: Bega Valley Shire
- Location: 448 km (278 mi) S of Sydney; 580 km (360 mi) ENE of Melbourne; 240 km (150 mi) SE of Canberra; 32 km (20 mi) SE of Bega; 27 km (17 mi) N of Eden

Government
  - State electorate: Bega
  - Federal division: Eden-Monaro
- Elevation: 11 m (36 ft)

Population
  - Total: 3,821 (2021 census)
- Postcode: 2548
- County: Auckland
- Mean max temp: 20.8 °C (69.4 °F)
- Mean min temp: 9.9 °C (49.8 °F)
- Annual rainfall: 770.0 mm (30.31 in)

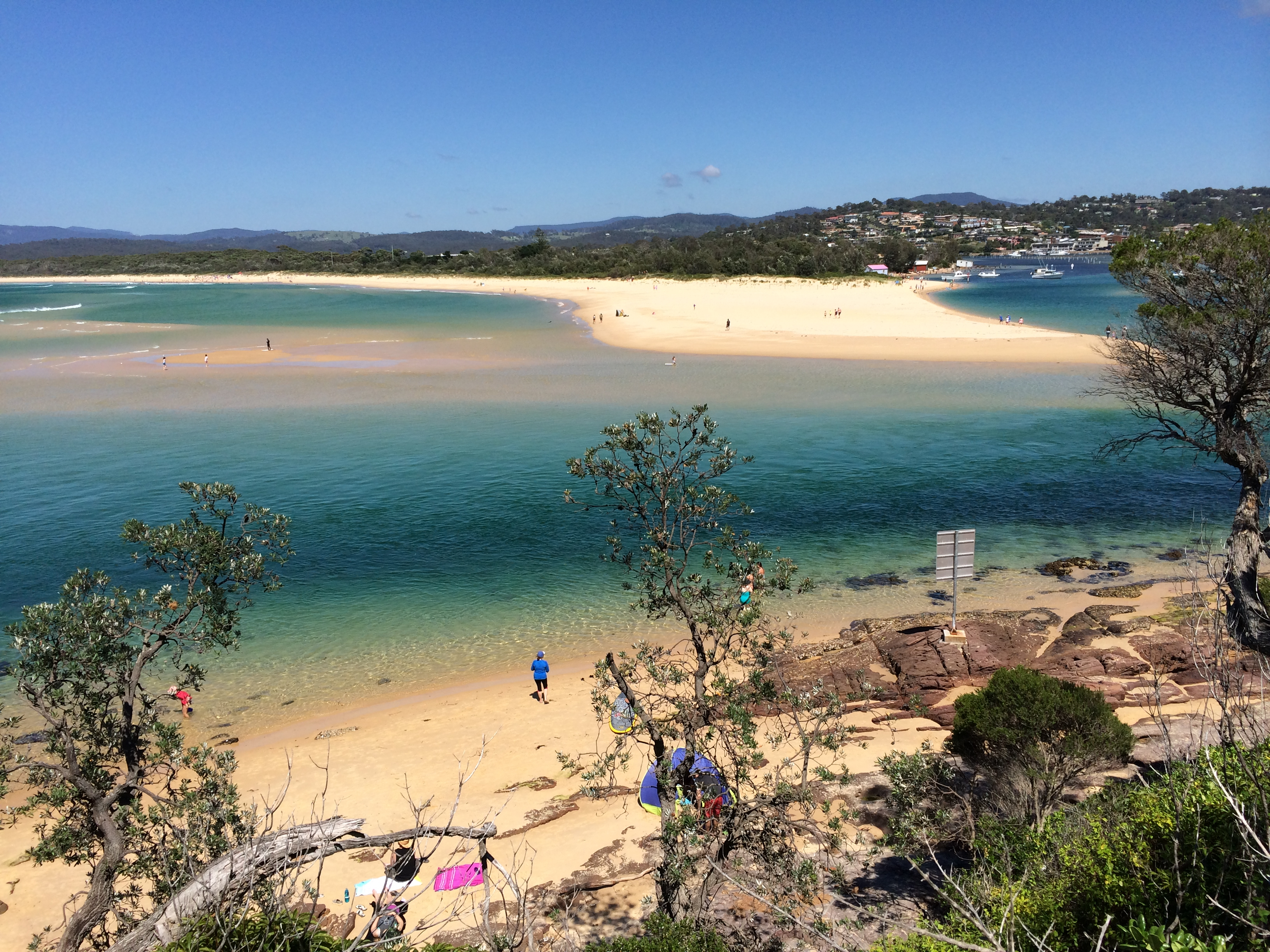
Merimbula Bar and Main beach

Merimbula /məˈrɪmbjələ/ is a town on the Merimbula Lake, located on the Far South Coast or Sapphire Coast of New South Wales, Australia. At the 2021 census, the population was 3,821, and over 11,500 when the satellite towns of Pambula and Tura Beach are included.

The population within 10 km of the Merimbula Post office is over 18,000 people. The satellite town of Tura Beach lies within the 10 km population radius.

== Early history ==
Merimbula Point is an area of palaeontological significance, regularly studied by the School of Earth Sciences at the Australian National University. Several previously unknown species have been found in the ancient sedimentary rocks there, including Merimbulaspis and Pambulaspis.

== Education ==
Merimbula has one primary school; Merimbula Public School. However, the town does not have a high school. Children from Merimbula have to travel to either Bega or Eden to attend public high school, or attend private schools in the surrounding areas, including Pambula Beach, Eden and Bega.

== Transport ==
Merimbula is one of only a few towns on the South Coast of NSW to have its own airport, Merimbula Airport. There are daily flights services by QantasLink and Rex Airlines, from Sydney and Melbourne to Merimbula. Flights from Sydney often stop in Moruya.

Situated just off the national highway 1, the Princes Highway, Merimbula is nearly the same distance to both Sydney and Melbourne, with both trips taking between five and seven hours to drive. It is approximately three hours drive to Australia's capital Canberra.

Merimbula is serviced by many interstate and intrastate road coach services, and connects with rail services at many interchanges.

Local commuter passenger bus services operate six days per week to nearly all urban areas and some regional centres within the council area.

== Sport ==
Merimbula has a green oval and two soccer Fields on the Berrambool Oval. The oval is used, depending on the time of year, for cricket (summer period) and Australian Football (winter period). The Merimbula Diggers compete in AFL Sapphire Coast and are one of the competition's most successful clubs. There are additional sporting facilities located within the Merimbula urban area. The Merimbula-Pambula Bulldogs are based in nearby Pambula and compete in the Group 16 Rugby League Premiership. Merimbula's soccer club is the Merimbula Grasshoppers which hosts men, women and junior sides. The Merimbula Knights Cricket Club are a club in the Far South Coast Cricket Association. Other sporting clubs include the Merimbula Basket Ball Club, Merimbula Big Game and Lakes Angling Club, and Merimbula Netball Association.

There are five golf courses within a one-hour drive from Merimbula, including Pambula Merimbula GC, Tura Beach Country Club, Eden Gardens Country Club and Bermagui Country Club.

Merimbula is the home town of Australian 2026 Winter Olympic Men’s Moguls Gold Medallist Cooper Woods-Topalovic.

== Climate ==
Merimbula has an oceanic climate (Cfb) with mild to warm summers and cool, windy, drier winters. Extreme temperatures have ranged from 44.2 °C (111.6 °F) to −2.0 °C (28.4 °F) and the average annual rainfall is 770.0 millimetres (30.3 in). Typical of the New South Wales coastline, the relatively dry winters and springs are attributed to the foehn effect.

Its relatively low annual rainfall owes to its south-western location, which in turn exposes it to cold southerly airmasses off the Bass Strait that rarely affect areas further north on the coast; as shown by its extreme minimum temperatures in the summer, most notably a reading of 3.9 °C (39.0 °F) in December 2019. Its climate more closely resembles those in East Gippsland than elsewhere on the New South Wales coastline, with its distinctly cooler temperatures and lower dew points.

Climate data for Merimbula Airport AWS (1998–2022); 2 m AMSL; 36.91° S, 149.90° E
Month	Jan	Feb	Mar	Apr	May	Jun	Jul	Aug	Sep	Oct	Nov	Dec	Year
Record high °C (°F)	44.2 (111.6)	41.3 (106.3)	38.1 (100.6)	36.1 (97.0)	27.7 (81.9)	23.0 (73.4)	26.2 (79.2)	29.0 (84.2)	34.5 (94.1)	37.0 (98.6)	40.0 (104.0)	42.0 (107.6)	44.2 (111.6)
Mean daily maximum °C (°F)	24.9 (76.8)	24.7 (76.5)	23.6 (74.5)	21.7 (71.1)	19.2 (66.6)	16.9 (62.4)	16.7 (62.1)	17.3 (63.1)	19.4 (66.9)	20.7 (69.3)	21.7 (71.1)	23.3 (73.9)	20.8 (69.4)
Mean daily minimum °C (°F)	15.5 (59.9)	15.3 (59.5)	13.7 (56.7)	10.9 (51.6)	7.6 (45.7)	5.6 (42.1)	4.2 (39.6)	4.8 (40.6)	6.8 (44.2)	9.1 (48.4)	11.9 (53.4)	13.8 (56.8)	9.9 (49.8)
Record low °C (°F)	7.0 (44.6)	7.8 (46.0)	5.7 (42.3)	4.0 (39.2)	−2.0 (28.4)	−1.0 (30.2)	−2.0 (28.4)	−1.3 (29.7)	0.0 (32.0)	2.0 (35.6)	2.0 (35.6)	3.9 (39.0)	−2.0 (28.4)
Average rainfall mm (inches)	66.8 (2.63)	85.5 (3.37)	92.3 (3.63)	65.2 (2.57)	56.2 (2.21)	70.9 (2.79)	49.6 (1.95)	45.1 (1.78)	41.6 (1.64)	61.3 (2.41)	78.7 (3.10)	66.2 (2.61)	770.0 (30.31)
Average rainy days (≥ 1.0mm)	7.1	6.1	6.5	5.7	4.3	5.4	4.1	4.8	5.6	7.9	7.8	7.1	72.4
Average afternoon relative humidity (%)	65	64	62	61	60	60	58	55	58	61	65	63	61
Average dew point °C (°F)	15.4 (59.7)	15.5 (59.9)	14.3 (57.7)	11.8 (53.2)	9.2 (48.6)	7.2 (45.0)	6.2 (43.2)	6.1 (43.0)	8.1 (46.6)	9.6 (49.3)	12.2 (54.0)	13.4 (56.1)	10.8 (51.4)
Source: Bureau of Meteorology

== Events ==
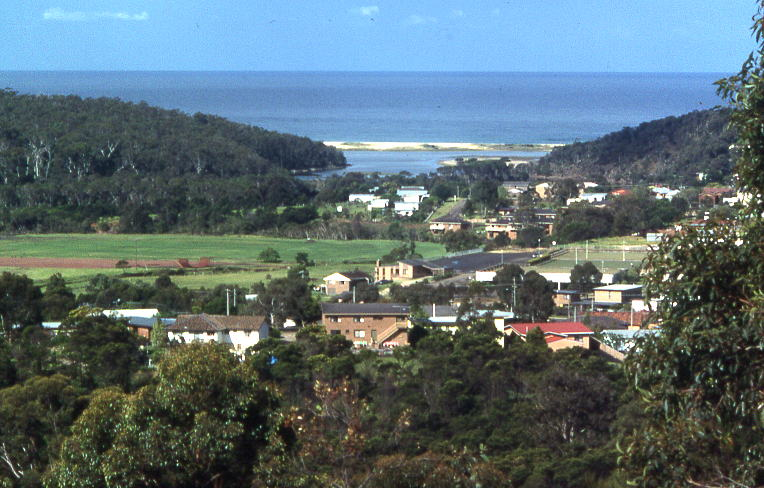
View of town

Merimbula's boardwalk

The annual Jazz Festival is held on the Queen's Birthday weekend early in June. A much smaller Country Music Festival is held in the Merimbula-Imlay Bowling Club around the beginning of November each year. The Pambula Merimbula Golf Club hosts one of the country's bigger Weeks of Golf attracting over 900 golfers during October.

Merimbula has a windsurfing and kiteboarding festival, the Merimbula Classic. This is held in late November each year.

== Economy ==
Merimbula is largely a tourist town, with the bulk of the town's earnings coming from tourism. There is a wide range of holiday accommodation in the area including motels, self-contained units and holiday houses for rent. Merimbula is known for its good beaches and locally produced oysters.

== Attractions ==
Merimbula has six main beaches—Main Beach (or Merimbula Beach), Mitchies Jetty, Bar Beach, Spencer Park Beach, Middle Beach and Short Point. Main Beach, Bar Beach and Short Point are considered to be the best beaches for surfing, whilst Bar Beach is also commonly used for snorkeling. Other activities include whale watching, fishing, kitesurfing and boating. Middle Beach is more suited to fishing, and whale watching in season. With a decent percentage of the population being retirees, golf and lawn bowls are popular as well. Merimbula has scuba diving, with the sponge gardens at Yellow Rock and the Empire Gladstone wreck off nearby Haycock Point's popular dives.

Merimbula is close to Bournda National Park, South East Forest National Park and the northern end of Beowa National Park. A coastal walk running through Bournda National Park from Tathra to Tura Beach just north of Merimbula takes in coastal scenery. Southern right whales (less frequent) and humpback whales are big feature in the areas.

It is also a short drive to other scenic places in the area such as Tathra, Eden and Bermagui.

Merimbula offers a range of activities from standup paddleboarding and kayaking, to some of the best surfing on the Far South Coast. Magic Mountain, Merimbula's own theme park has a roller coaster and one of the best toboggan slopes in New South Wales.

The Merimbula Wharf offers its own aquarium full of some of the common sea creatures on the Sapphire Coast. It is also a popular restaurant for tourists as well as locals.

The Aquarium is a has a wide variety of marine life, 'from sharks to shrimp, octopus to tropical fish, it's all in the living theatre of the deep!’, according to TripAdvisor. It has 25 tanks of aquatic life.

There are many restaurants and eateries in Merimbula, including one small bar.

10 kilometres to the west of Merimbula along the Princes Highway towards Bega, Potoroo Palace Wildlife Sanctuary is located. This nature park has a collection of native species with some hands on opportunities for the children. It also cares for injured or orphaned animals.

== Heritage listings ==
Merimbula has a number of heritage-listed sites, including:

- Monaro Street: Courunga
