= Tantawangalo =

Locality in New South Wales, Australia

Tantawangalo is an Australian locality in the Bega Valley Shire and the Eden-Monaro federal electorate. At the 2016 census, it had a population of 156. It contains a significant portion of the South East Forests National Park and borders onto the Tantawangalo State Forest. It contains the scenic Six Mile Creek Campground.
