= Bega Valley Shire =

Bega Valley
- Local government area
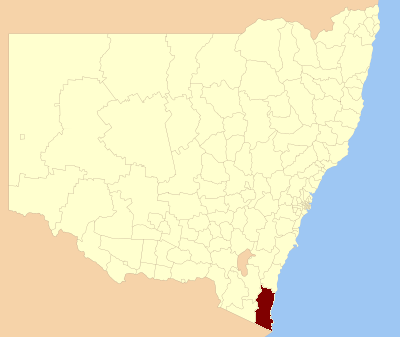
- Location in New South Wales

- Interactive map of Bega Valley
- Coordinates: 36°40′S 149°50′E
- Country: Australia
- State: New South Wales
- Region: South Coast
- Established: 1981
- Council seat: Bega

Government
  - Mayor: Russell Fitpatrick (Mayor); Anthony McMahon (CEO)
  - State electorate: Bega
  - Federal division: Eden-Monaro

Area
  - Total: 6,279 km^{2} (2,424 sq mi)

Population
  - Total: 35,942 (LGA 2021)
- Website: Bega Valley
LGAs around Bega Valley
Snowy Monaro	Eurobodalla	Tasman Sea
Snowy Monaro	Bega Valley	Tasman Sea
East Gippsland (Vic)	East Gippsland (Vic)	Tasman Sea

The Bega Valley Shire is a local government area located adjacent to the south-eastern coastline of New South Wales, Australia. The Shire was formed in 1981 with the amalgamation of the Municipality of Bega, Imlay Shire and Mumbulla Shire, with its name deriving from the town of Bega. The shire is also known as the Sapphire Coast for tourism and marketing purposes. During the 2019–20 Australian bushfire season, the area was devastated by fire, with 448 houses being destroyed by fire and approximately 365,000 hectares burned, which is 58% of the Shire's total land mass.

The estimated population as at the 2021 census was 35,942.

The current mayor is Russell Fitzpatrick, an independent who joined the Liberal Party in 2023.

== History ==
Yuin since ancient times (at least 5000BC). First white settlers in early 1800s, farming, timber, fishing, mining.

== Area ==
The shire covers 6,040 square kilometres (2,330 sq mi), and includes a coastline of 225 km (140 mi), with 101 beaches and 26 estuaries. Around 78% of the area belongs to various national parks and state forests. The biggest industry is the production of timber, followed by dairy farming and other agriculture. Smaller industries include fishing, oyster harvesting, and tourism. The Biamanga National Park includes important Aboriginal sites.

=== Towns and localities ===
The area extends from Bermagui in the north to the Victorian border in the south and includes the towns of Bega, Tathra, Merimbula, Tura Beach, Wolumla, Cobargo, Bemboka, Pambula, Pambula Beach and the former whaling port, tourism hotspot, and major port of Eden.

Smaller localities include:

- Angledale
- Bald Hills
- Barragga Bay
- Berrambool
- Black Range
- Bournda
- Boydtown
- Broadwater
- Brogo
- Buckajo
- Burragate
- Candelo
- Chinnock
- Coolagolite
- Coopers Gully
- Cuttagee
- Devils Hole
- Dignams Creek
- Doctor George Mountain
- Edrom
- Frogs Hollow
- Greendale
- Greigs Flat
- Jellat Jellat
- Kalaru
- Kameruka
- Kanoona
- Kiah
- Kingswood
- Lochiel
- Millingandi
- Mirador
- Mogareeka
- Mogilla
- Morans Crossing
- Mount Darragh
- Murrah
- Myrtle Mountain
- Narrabarba
- Nelson
- Nethercote
- New Buildings
- Nullica
- Numbugga
- Nungatta (part)
- Nungatta South
- Pericoe
- Quaama
- Reedy Swamp
- Rocky Hall
- South Pambula
- South Wolumla
- Stony Creek
- Tanja
- Tantawangalo
- Tarraganda
- Timbillica
- Toothdale
- Towamba
- Verona
- Wallagoot
- Wandella
- Wapengo
- Wolumla
- Wonboyn
- Wyndham
- Yellow Pinch
- Yowrie

== Council ==
Bega Valley Shire Council is composed of nine councillors elected proportionally as one entire ward. All councillors are elected for a fixed four-year term of office. The mayor is elected by the councillors at the first meeting of the council. The most recent election was held on 4 December 2021, and the makeup of the Council is as follows:

Party	Councillors
Independent	6
Labor	1
Independent Liberal	1
Greens	1
Total	9

The current Council, elected in 2021, in order of election, is:

Councillor	Party	Notes
Helen O’Neil	Labor	
Karen Wright	Independent	
Russel Fitzpatrick	Independent Liberal	Mayor
Tony Allen	Independent	
Cathy Griff	Greens	Deputy Mayor
Mitch Nadin	Independent	
David Porter	Independent	
Liz Seckold	Independent	
Joy Robin	Independent	

== Election results ==
=== 2024 ===
2024 New South Wales local elections: Bega Valley
Party	Candidate	Votes	%	±%
Independents For Change	1. Mitchell Nadin (elected); 2. David Porter (elected); 3. Peggy Noble (elected); 4. Jason Hetherington; 5. Morgan Eneberg	7,374	34.63	+34.63
Labor	1. Helen O'Neil (elected); 2. Simon Daly (elected); 3. David Neyle; 4. Nicola Collins	5,296	24.87	+7.57
Greens	1. Peter Haggar (elected); 2. Liane Munro; 3. Emma Goward; 4. Vivian Harris; 5. Jamie Shaw	2,926	13.74	+1.34
Independent	Russell Fitzpatrick (elected mayor)	2,044	9.60	−3.50
Independent	Tony Allen (elected)	1,836	8.62	−3.48
Independent	Clair Mudaliar (elected)	1,082	5.08	+5.08
Independent	Phillip Dummett	733	3.44	+3.44
Total formal votes		21,291	90.87	−0.53
Informal votes		2,138	9.13	+0.53
Turnout		23,429		

=== 2021 ===
2021 New South Wales local elections: Bega Valley
Party	Candidate	Votes	%	±%
Labor	1. Helen O'Neil (elected); 2. Simon Daly	4,943	17.3	
Independent	Russell Fitzpatrick (elected)	2,818	13.1	
Greens	1. Cathy Griff (elected); 2. Vivian Harris; 3. Paula Park; 4. Angus Ashcroft; 5. Peter Haggar	2,665	12.4	
Independent	Tony Allen (elected)	2,594	12.1	
Independent	Karen Wright (elected)	2,539	11.8	
Independent	Mitch Nadin (elected)	1,201	5.6	
Independent	Joy Robin (elected)	1,080	5.0	
Independent	David Porter (elected)	1,003	4.7	
Independent	Mike Britten	884	4.1	
Independent	Liz Seckhold (elected)	875	4.1	
Independent	Nathan O'Donnell	852	4.0	
Independent	Joshua Shoobridge	650	3.0	
Independent	Neil Bourke	568	2.6	
Total formal votes		21,435	91.4	
Informal votes		2,026	8.6	
Turnout		23,461	87.9	

== Demographics ==
Selected historical census data for Bega Valley Shire local government area
Census year		2011	2016	2021
Population	Estimated residents on census night	31,950	▲33,253	▲35,942
Population	LGA rank in terms of size within New South Wales	56th	▼57th	
Population	% of New South Wales population	0.46%	▼0.44%	0.44%
Population	% of Australian population	0.15%	▼0.14%	0.14%
Cultural and language diversity				
Ancestry, top responses	English	32.5%	▼31.9%	▲43.8%
Ancestry, top responses	Australian	31.3%	▼30.9%	▲40.7
Ancestry, top responses	Irish	9.3%	▼9.2%	▲13.0%
Ancestry, top responses	Scottish	8.4%	▼8.2%	▲11.4%
Ancestry, top responses	German	3.8%	▼3.7%	▲5.1%
Language, top responses (other than English)	German	0.6%	▼0.5%	▼0.4%
Language, top responses (other than English)	Dutch	0.3%	▼0.2%	–
Language, top responses (other than English)	Italian	0.2%	0.2%	–
Language, top responses (other than English)	French	0.2%	0.2%	0.2%
Language, top responses (other than English)	Thai	n/r	0.2%	0.2%
Religious affiliation				
Religious affiliation, top responses	No religion, so described	26.7%	▲35.1%	▲46.9%
Religious affiliation, top responses	Anglican	27.3%	▼21.9%	▼16.4%
Religious affiliation, top responses	Catholic	20.0%	▼17.9%	▼15.1%
Religious affiliation, top responses	Not stated	n/r	10.4%	▼8.3%
Religious affiliation, top responses	Uniting Church	4.6%	▼3.7%	▼2.7%
Median weekly incomes				
Personal income	Median weekly personal income	$454	▲$538	▲$645
Personal income	% of Australian median income	78.7%	▲81.3%	▲80.1%
Family income	Median weekly family income	$1,014	▲$1,242	▲$1,501
Family income	% of Australian median income	68.5%	▲71.6%	▼70.8%
Household income	Median weekly household income	$848	▲$986	▲$1,200
Household income	% of Australian median income	68.7%	▼68.6%	▲68.7%

== See also ==
- List of local government areas in New South Wales
- Bega Valley Arts and Crafts Society
