= Crankies Plain Bridge =

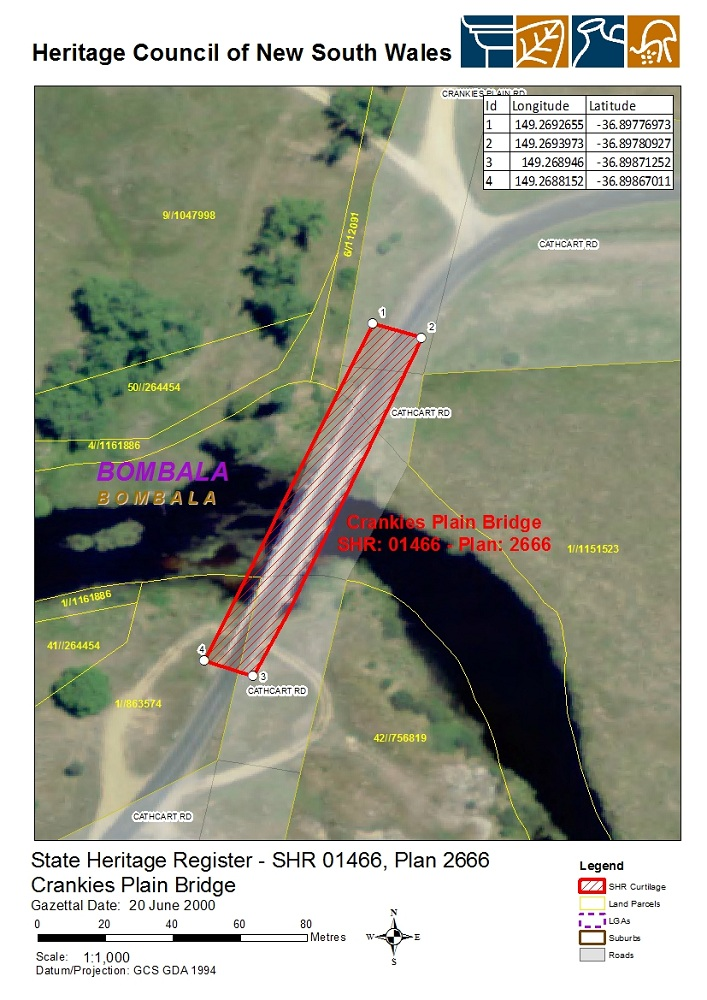
- Heritage boundaries
- Coordinates: 36°53′54″S 149°16′09″E
- Carries: Main Road
- Crosses: Coolumbooka River
- Locale: Bombala, New South Wales, Australia
- Owner: Transport for NSW

Characteristics
- Design: McDonald truss bridge
- Material: Timber
- Total length: 46 metres (150 ft)
- Width: 5 metres (15 ft)
- Longest span: 11 metres (35 ft)
- No. of spans: Two

History
- Architect: John McDonald
- Constructed by: NSW Public Works Department
- Construction cost: A£2,964
- Opened: 1892

New South Wales Heritage Register
- Official name: Crankies Plain Bridge
- Type: State heritage (built)
- Designated: 20 June 2000
- Reference no.: 1466
- Type: Road Bridge
- Category: Transport – Land
- Builders: NSW Public Works

Crankies Plain Bridge is a heritage-listed road bridge that carries Main Road across the Coolumbooka River in Bombala, New South Wales, Australia. It was designed by John McDonald and built in 1892 by the New South Wales Public Works Department. The bridge is owned by Transport for NSW. It was added to the New South Wales State Heritage Register on 20 June 2000.

== History ==
State transport and public works records indicate that it was built in 1892 for a cost of A£2,964.

== Description ==
The bridge consists of two 23-metre (75 ft) truss spans flanked by two timber girder spans at each end (one 11-metre (35 ft) and one 9-metre (30 ft) span at each end). All are supported by timber piers with piles driven into rock. The bridge width is 5 metres (15 ft) between kerbs at its narrowest.

It was reported to be in generally fair to good condition as at 13 September 2005, with maintenance by Roads and Maritime Services as it is a functioning road bridge.

== Heritage listing ==
This bridge is a McDonald timber truss road bridge. Timber truss road bridges were extensively used in New South Wales because of the high quality of local hardwoods and the shortage of steel during the early decades of settlement of the state. The timber truss was highly developed for bridges in New South Wales, perhaps more so than anywhere else in the world at that time. The McDonald truss is a significant evolutionary link in the development of timber road bridges in New South Wales and has three standard span lengths, 20 metres (65 ft), 23 metres (75 ft), and 27 metres (90 ft). At March 1998 there were seven McDonald truss road bridges remaining in New South Wales, this bridge being a representative example. The bridge has been assessed as having State Significance.

Crankies Plain Bridge was listed on the New South Wales State Heritage Register on 20 June 2000 having satisfied the following criteria.

The place is important in demonstrating the course, or pattern, of cultural or natural history in New South Wales.

McDonald truss bridges have historical significance because timber truss bridges were developed and refined in Australia to achieve the highest level of timber bridge construction for the time of their design and the McDonald truss is an important recognisable design in the evolution of timber truss bridges in NSW.

The place is important in demonstrating aesthetic characteristics and/or a high degree of creative or technical achievement in New South Wales.

McDonald truss bridges have aesthetic significance because they are evocative of Australian methods of bridge construction, in their materials, scale and configuration they reflect and express nineteenth century technologies and experiences and for the time of their design and construction they demonstrate the best quality design available.

The place has strong or special association with a particular community or cultural group in New South Wales for social, cultural or spiritual reasons.

McDonald truss bridges have social significance because their size and location contribute directly to the local area and they are a strong element in the local address.

== See also ==
- Historic bridges of New South Wales
- List of bridges in Australia
