= Undowah River =

Coordinates: 36°45′S 149°19′E

Location
- Country: Australia
- State: New South Wales
- Region: South Eastern Highlands (IBRA), Monaro
- Local government areas: Snowy Monaro Regional Council

Physical characteristics
- Source: Thoko Hill
  - location: southwest of Bemboka
  - elevation: 1,030 m (3,380 ft)
- Mouth: confluence with the Bombala River
  - location: near Bibbenluke
  - elevation: 731 m (2,398 ft)
- Length: 21 km (13 mi)

Basin features
- River system: Snowy River catchment
- Tributaries
  - left: Grassy Flat Creek

The Undowah River, a perennial river of the Snowy River catchment, is located in the Monaro region of New South Wales, Australia.

== Course and features ==
The Undowah River rises on the southern slopes of Thoko Hill, near the locality of Bellevue, southwest of Bemboka. The river flows generally south by west, joined by one minor tributary before reaching its confluence with the Bombala River near the village of Bibbenluke, northeast of Bombala. The river descends 301 metres (988 ft) over its 21 kilometres (13 mi) course.

== See also ==
- Rivers of New South Wales
- List of rivers of New South Wales (L–Z)
- List of rivers of Australia
