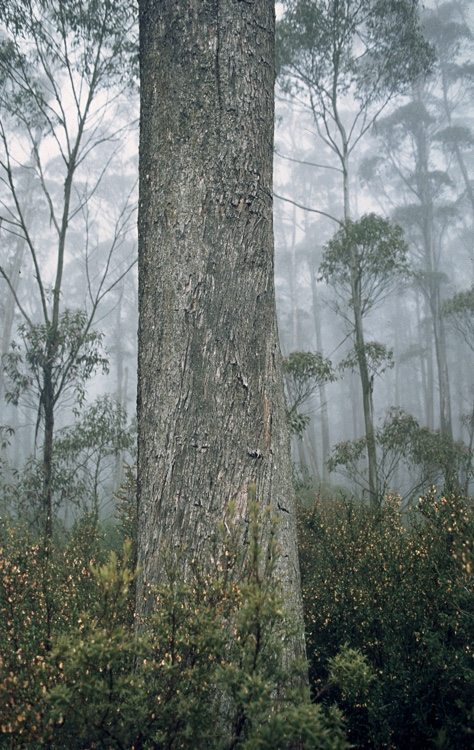

Scientific classification
- Kingdom: Plantae
- Clade: Embryophytes
- Clade: Tracheophytes
- Clade: Spermatophytes
- Clade: Angiosperms
- Clade: Eudicots
- Clade: Rosids
- Order: Myrtales
- Family: Myrtaceae
- Genus: Eucalyptus
- Species: E. dendromorpha

Binomial name
- Eucalyptus dendromorpha (Blakely) L.A.S.Johnson & Blaxell

Synonyms
- Eucalyptus obtusiflora var. dendromorpha Blakely

= Eucalyptus dendromorpha =

Budawang ash

Species of eucalyptus

Eucalyptus dendromorpha, the Budawang ash or giant mallee ash is a species of tree endemic to southeastern Australia. It has rough, compacted bark on the lower part of the trunk, smooth white to cream-coloured bark above, lance-shaped to curved adult leaves, flower buds in groups of between seven and eleven, white flowers and cup-shaped or barrel-shaped fruit.

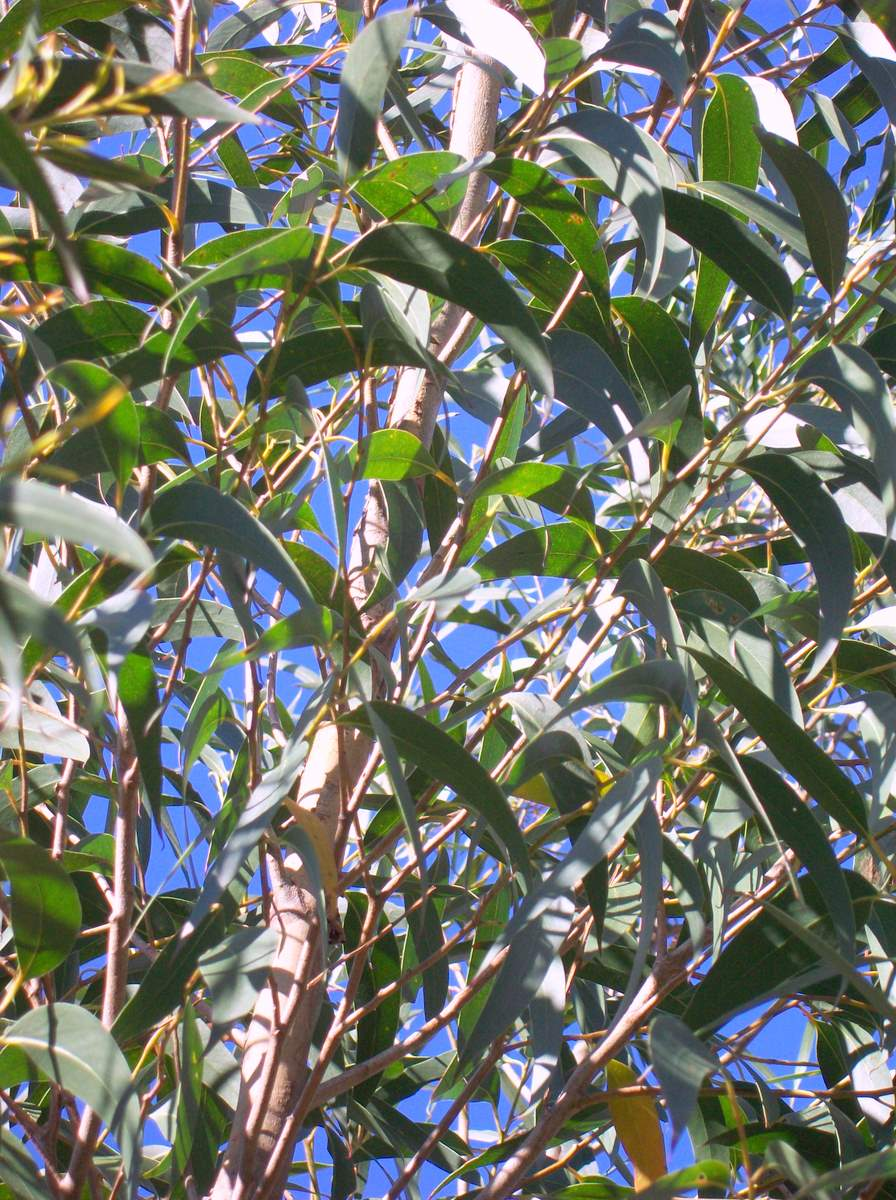
Leaves

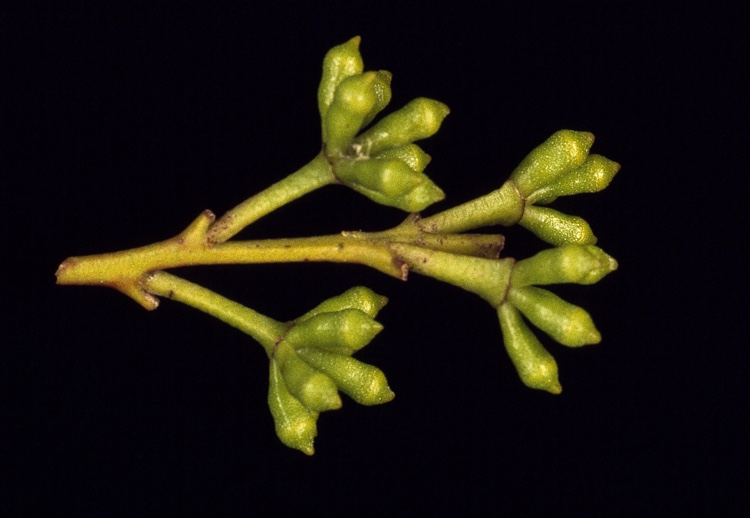
Flower buds

== Description ==
Eucalyptus dendromorpha is a tree that typically grows to a height of 15 m (49 ft) but sometimes to 30 m (98 ft), and forms a lignotuber. It has rough, compacted scaly, flaky or short-fibrous bark on the base of the trunk, smooth grey or white bark above, the smooth bark often with insect scribbles. Young plants and coppice regrowth have elliptic leaves that are glossy green but paler on the lower surface, 75–140 mm (3.0–5.5 in) long and 20–50 mm (0.79–1.97 in) wide. Adult leaves are the same glossy green on both sides, lance-shaped to curved, 70–120 mm (2.8–4.7 in) long and 10–25 mm (0.39–0.98 in) wide on a petiole 6–15 mm (0.24–0.59 in) long. The flower buds are arranged in leaf axils in groups of seven, nine or eleven, on an unbranched peduncle 6–15 mm (0.24–0.59 in) long, the individual buds on a pedicel 2–6 mm (0.079–0.236 in) long. Mature flower buds are oval to club-shaped, 5–6 mm (0.20–0.24 in) long and 2–3 mm (0.079–0.118 in) wide with a conical to rounded operculum with a small point on the tip. Flowering mainly occurs in December and January and the flowers are white. The fruit is a woody cup-shaped or barrel-shaped capsule 7–10 mm (0.28–0.39 in) long and 7–11 mm (0.28–0.43 in) wide on a pedicel 1–5 mm (0.039–0.197 in) long and with the valves enclosed below the rim of the fruit.

== Taxonomy and naming ==
Budawang ash was first formally described in 1941 by William Blakely from a specimen collected by Richard Hind Cambage in West Albion Park near MacquariePass. Blakely gave it the name Eucalyptus obtusiflora var. dendromorpha and published the description in The Australian Naturalist. In 1972 Lawrie Johnson and Donald Blaxell raised the variety to species status as E. dendromorpha. The specific epithet (dendromorpha) is derived from the Ancient Greek words dendron meaning "tree" and morphe meaning "form" or "shape", referring to the habit of this species, compared to the mallee E. obtusiflora.

This species is similar to the white ash, but has differently coloured juvenile leaves and seeds.

== Distribution and habitat ==
Eucalyptus dendromorpha grows in forest on the ranges south from Mount Tomah in the Blue Mountains to Monga near Braidwood.
