= Minard Fannie Crommelin =

Australian conservationist

Minard Crommelin MBE
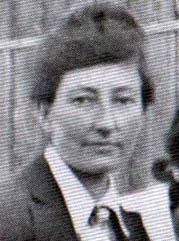
- circa 1915
- Born: 29 June 1881; Aston Station, near Bombala, New South Wales, Australia
- Died: 14 February 1972 (aged 90); Pearl Beach, New South Wales, Australia

Minard Crommelin MBE (1881–1972) was an Australian postmistress and environmental conservationist.

Crommelin was born on 29 June 1881 at Aston Station, near Bombala, New South Wales.

Crommelin was appointed an Order of the British Empire (M.B.E), Civil member, in recognition of service to the flora and fauna on 1 January 1959.

Both Crommelin Crescent, St Helens Park and Crommelin Place, Chisholm, have been named in her honour.

Crommelin died at her home in Pearl Beach, New South Wales on 14 February 1972, aged 90.

== Postmistress ==
At 12 years of age Crommelin left Pipe Clay Creek Public School and assisted the Burrawong postmistress who later sent her to the Sydney Church of England Girls Grammar School for a year. She was one of the early operators of the Morse Telegraph Key. Eventually Crommelin became an assistant at Moss Vale post office. From 1906 Crommelin was the acting postmistress at Woy Woy for 5 years during which time she took public service examinations. She visited Pearl Beach for the first time with her friend Charles Pryce in a small cedar sailing boat in approximately 1910. Over the proceeding 20 years Crommelin was a relieving postmistress at over 150 towns. In 1937, aged 56, she retired from the public service.

== Environmental conservation ==
Crommelin paid £84 for land in Pearl Beach adjoining the Brisbane Water National Park. In 1938, after canvassing support from various societies to which she belonged Warrah Sanctuary was proclaimed with Crommelin the founding trustee. In 1937 she had bought 2.8 hectares of land adjoining the sanctuary at Pearl Beach and moved there in 1939. On her land she engaged in beekeeping and raised native plants.

Crommelin unsuccessfully lobbied politicians, government departments and newspaper editors for the establishment of a national botanic garden, fauna park and arboretum and for a national ecological conservation authority.

Crommelin constantly protested against the local destruction of flora and fauna, careless back-burning and debatable infrastructure developments.

=== Crommelin Biological Field Station ===
In December 1946, Crommelin offered her Warrah Sanctuary to the University of Sydney with one condition: she could live out her remaining years on the land. The university accepted and developed a biological and natural field station for research and named it the Crommelin Biological Field Station.

The Field Station accommodates for up to 26 bunk-style beds. There is a fully equipped kitchen, a dining room, a small unequipped laboratory area and a common room. At present the facility is available to employed research workers and educators from the tertiary education system only. Children under 18 years of age are not permitted to use the station. As of December 2010, the lodging charge was $16.50 per head per day.

== Other community interests ==
Crommelin donated and bequeathed to the Australian Academy of Science to establish the Crommelin Ecological Conservation Fund. She was a member of the Society of Australian Genealogists and the Huguenot Society, London. She helped to form local branches of the Australian Red Cross, the Country Women's Association of New South Wales and the Business and Professional Women's Club of Sydney.

Crommelin Place, in the Canberra suburb of Chisholm, is named in her honour.

== See also ==
- French Australians
