= William Keys (Australian Army officer) =

Australian Army officer

Sir William Keys
- Born: 2 February 1923; Lidcombe, New South Wales
- Died: 3 May 2000 (aged 77); Queanbeyan, New South Wales
- Spouse: Dulcie Beryl Stinton (m. 1946)
- Military career
- Allegiance: Australia
- Branch: Australian Army
- Rank: Captain
- Conflicts: Second World War; New Guinea campaign; Battle of Tarakan; Korean War
- Awards: Knight Bachelor; Companion of the Order of Australia; Officer of the Order of the British Empire; Military Cross
- Other work: President of the Returned and Services League (1978–88)

Sir Alexander George William "Bill" Keys, AC, OBE, MC (2 February 1923 – 3 May 2000) was an Australian Army officer and a long-serving president of the Returned and Services League (RSL).

== Early life and career ==
Keys was born in Sydney on 2 February 1923 and grew up on his family's farm at Bombala. He enlisted in the military in 1940 and served with the Second Australian Imperial Force in New Guinea. He was wounded while serving with the 2/3rd Pioneer Battalion in the Tarakan campaign (1945), and was invalided home for the rest of the war. He also served in the Korean War with the 3rd Battalion, Royal Australian Regiment, although he was also wounded in that conflict. He received the Military Cross in 1952.

Before the Korean War, Keys had been elected to the New South Wales council of the RSL (1947), and he became national secretary of the RSL in 1961, rising to the presidency and retaining it until 1986. Keys, who also served as international president of the Federation of Korean War Veterans Associations, was appointed Officer of the Order of the British Empire in 1970 and Companion of the Order of Australia in 1988. He was knighted in 1979.

== Personal life ==
Keys married Dulcie Beryl Stinton at St Phillip's Church of England, Auburn on 12 September 1950. The couple had met on the Orion, on a voyage to England in June the previous year.

Keys died at home in Queanbeyan of cancer in 2000. Lady Keys, his widow, died aged 94 on 7 April 2018, survived by their three daughters.
