= Bombala River =

Coordinates: 36°50′S 148°58′E

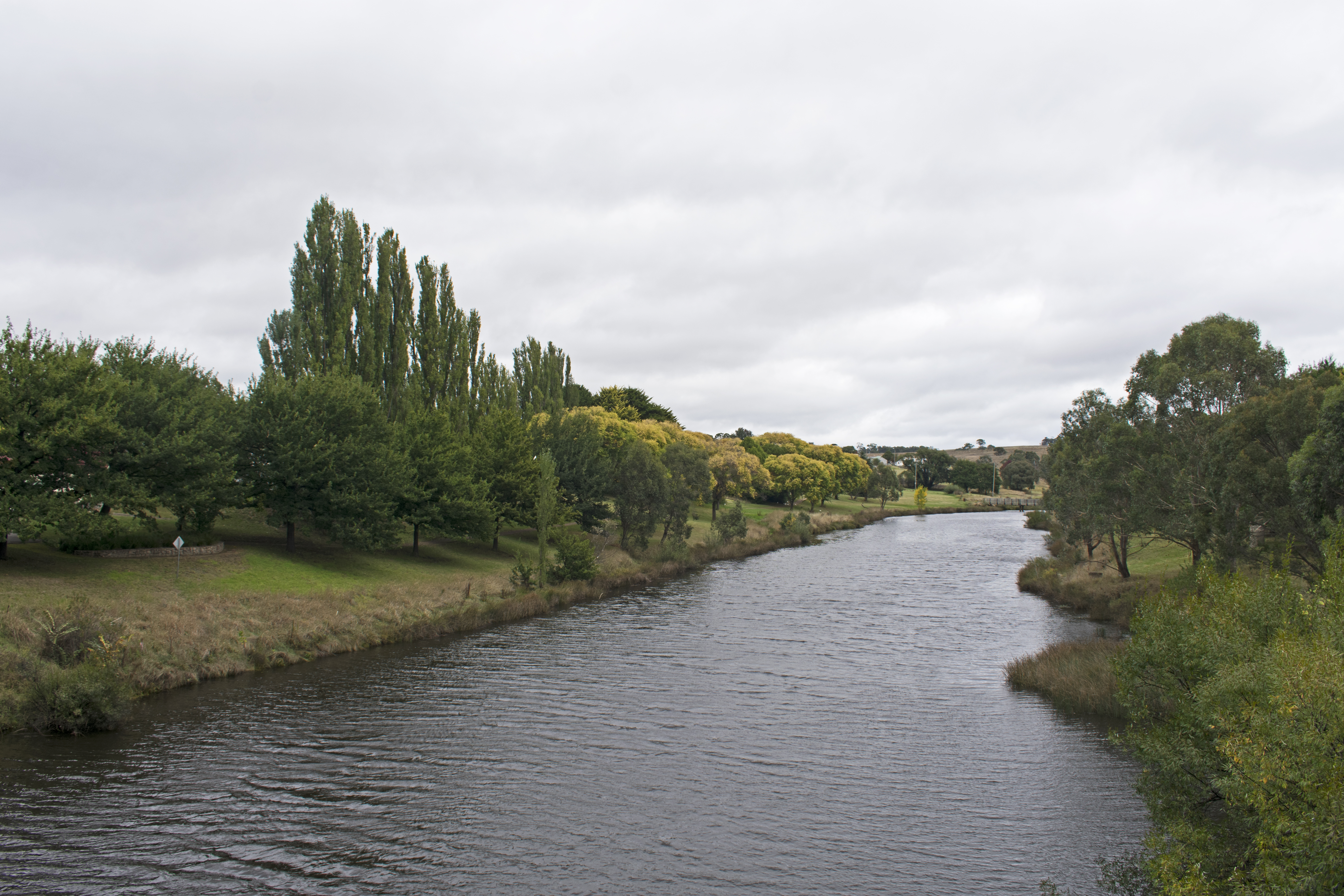
- Bombala River seen from Forbes Street downstream, Bombala
- Etymology: Aboriginal: "meeting of the water"

Location
- Country: Australia
- State: New South Wales
- Region: South Eastern Highlands (IBRA), Monaro
- Local government areas: Snowy Monaro Regional Council

Physical characteristics
- Source: Kybeyan Range, Great Dividing Range
  - location: below Brown Mountain
  - elevation: 1,170 m (3,840 ft)
- Mouth: confluence with the Delegate River
  - location: west of Bombala
  - elevation: 635 m (2,083 ft)
- Length: 87 km (54 mi)

Basin features
- River system: Snowy River catchment
- Tributaries
  - left: Big Bog Creek, Back Creek (Cooma-Monaro, New South Wales), Coolumbooka River, Saucy Creek, Ashton Creek
  - right: Undowah River, Bukalong Creek, Cambalong Creek

The Bombala River, a perennial river of the Snowy River catchment, is located in the Monaro region of New South Wales, Australia.

== Course and features ==
The Bombala River rises within the Kybeyan Range, part of the Great Dividing Range, on the southwestern slopes of Brown Mountain. The river flows generally southwest, joined by eight tributaries including the Undowah River and the Coolumbooka River, before reaching its confluence with the Delegate River approximately 17 kilometres (11 mi) west of Bombala. The river descends 535 metres (1,755 ft) over its 87 kilometres (54 mi) course.

In its upper reaches, the Bombala River is crossed by the Snowy Mountains Highway near Brown Mountain; while the Monaro Highway crosses the meandering river at several locations north of Bombala.

The name of the river is derived from the Aboriginal word meaning "meeting of the water", presumably referring to the confluence of the Bombala River with the Coolumbooka River, at Bombala; and the confluence with the Undowah River, a few kilometers upstream.

== See also ==
- Rivers of New South Wales
- List of rivers of New South Wales (A–K)
- List of rivers of Australia
