= Brown Mountain (New South Wales) =

Mountain in New South Wales, Australia

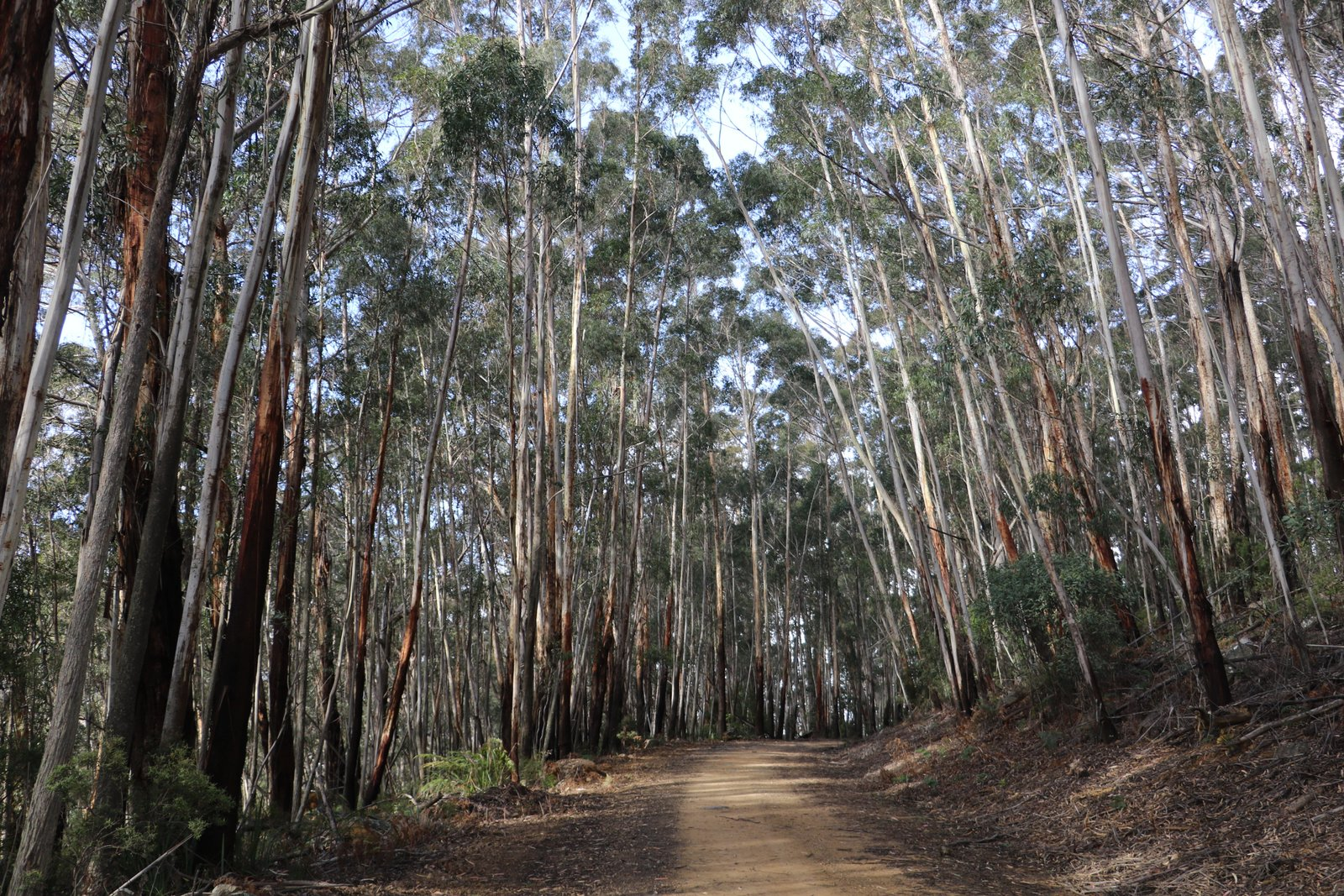
- White Ash on Brown Mountain

Highest point
- Elevation: 1,243 m (4,078 ft)
- Coordinates: 36°35′55″S 149°23′05″E

Geography
- Location within New South Wales
- Location: Monaro region, New South Wales, Australia
- Parent range: Kybeyan Range, Great Dividing Range

Climbing
- Easiest route: Snowy Mountains Highway

Brown Mountain, at an elevation of 1,243 metres (4,078 ft) AHD, is the highest mountain in the Monaro region of New South Wales, Australia.

== Location and features ==
Brown Mountain is located in the Kybeyan Range that is part of the Great Dividing Range. The mountain is approximately 13 kilometres (8.1 mi) from the village of Nimmitabel, approximately 17 kilometres (11 mi) from the village of Bemboka, and approximately 34 kilometres (21 mi) from the village of Candelo.

An unsealed access road is located 230 metres (750 ft) below the summit adjoins the Snowy Mountains Highway.

Little Brown Mountain, located 4.5 kilometres (2.8 mi) north of Bemboka, has an elevation of 514 metres (1,686 ft) AHD.

== See also ==
- Bombala River
- Cochrane Dam (New South Wales) § Brown Mountain Power Station
- Cochrane Dam
- List of mountains in Australia § New South Wales
