= K. M. Bolton =

Kenneth McLeod Bolton (c. December 1896 – 16 June 1961), variously referred to as Ken, or McLeod, Bolton, was the Australian-born president of the New South Wales branch of the RSSAILA, later known as Returned and Services League of Australia (RSL), from 1946 to 1950. He was known particularly for his antipathy to immigration of eastern European refugees, a dominant factor of Australian politics in the 1950s.

== History ==
Bolton was born in Orrissa, India, the son of John McLeod Bolton (died 9 June 1943).

He enlisted with the Australian Army at Goulburn, New South Wales in January 1916, aged 19 years and one month. He was appointed private, assigned to the 9th Field Ambulance in April 1916 and shortly his mother became involved in soldiers' comforts as secretary of the unit's comforts fund. In November 1916 he was despatched to France, attached to the 35th Battalion and saw much action at Messines. He was returned to Australia in October 1917 suffering trench fever and was discharged in January 1918. His 1940 claim, as having been Mentioned in Despatches during the Battle of Messines by Captain Dr Renwick and later by Colonel Goddart, was not supported.

In 1923 he was a founding director of Australian Soldiers' Providoring Company Ltd, with a capital of £10,000. The company was in the business of supplying ships' provisions.

In 1943 he was one of two persons nominated to E. M. Mitchell's seat on the Legislative Council. Robert Emmet Savage however, with support from the premier, was elected.

In 1944 he supported the push for an ex-servicemen's radio station. He appealed against the appointment of J. S. Hanlon, editor of The Australian Worker, the organ of the Australian Workers' Union (AWU) to the Australian Broadcasting Commission, in preference to J. P. "Digger" Dunn, who was a returned soldier and former senator, and had seven years' experience as head of an advertising business.

By November 1944 he was chairman of the RSL committee on rehabilitation of returned soldiers and urged immediate government issue of clothing, retraining of soldiers who had fallen on hard times during the Depression, and financial support for ex-servicemen, and widows of fallen soldiers, who wished to start their own businesses. He contrasted Australia's niggardly support for ex-servicemen with that of New Zealand, where 60% of new homes were allocated to ex-servicemen, He opposed the closing of hotels and restriction of sales of alcoholic beverages on Anzac Day.

In 1945 he was elected vice-president of NSW branch of the RSL, and for much of that year acted as president.

Bolton had a history of opposition to immigration: he opposed British settlers, even ex-servicemen, but especially German Jews, people who had been rendered homeless by the Nazis, and had been given shelter by Chinese in Kowloon, and elsewhere. His view of these refugees as "enemy aliens" found little support. Arthur Calwell, the Minister for Immigration, was the particular butt of his criticism, while the Jewish lobby criticised the government for restricting the number of immigrants from eastern Europe. Calwell contended they were allowing as many as the country could absorb, while remaining culturally British.

In 1949 he retired as NSW president of the RSL, having survived four re-elections. He was praised by the State Secretary, J. R. Lewis (Note: Joseph Richard Lewis became secretary in 1943, succeeding Roden Cutler VC, who followed John Black in 1942.) for his efforts on behalf of servicemen and in securing the future of the League. In four years £500,000 had been raised to build a new Anzac House (Note: Anzac House, on Martin Place, Sydney, was a club for members, or service personnel who were eligible to become members, of the RSSAILA.) and doubled its staff at State Headquarters.

In 1953 he resigned his membership in protest against the statement of the Governor-General, Sir William Slim, that ex-servicemen should not expect too many privileges. Despite his resignation being refused at his (North Sydney) sub-branch, he was distressed to find he was no longer a member of the League.
