= Coolumbooka River =

River in New South Wales, Australia

Coordinates: 36°54′S 149°14′E

Location
- Country: Australia
- State: New South Wales
- Region: South Eastern Highlands (IBRA), Monaro
- Local government area: Snowy Monaro Regional Council

Physical characteristics
- Source confluence: Badgerys Creek and Horseys Swamp Creek
  - location: near Cathcart
  - elevation: 803 m (2,635 ft)
- Mouth: confluence with the Bombala River
  - location: near Bombala
  - elevation: 698 m (2,290 ft)
- Length: 26 km (16 mi)

Basin features
- River system: Snowy River catchment
- Tributaries
  - right: Dragon Swamp Creek
- Reservoir: Coolumbooka Weir

The Coolumbooka River, a perennial river of the Snowy River catchment, is located in the Monaro region of New South Wales, Australia.

== Course and features ==
The Coolumbooka River is formed by the confluence of the Badgerys Creek and the Horseys Swamp Creek in a swampy area, located approximately 10 kilometres (6.2 mi) east northeast of the village of Cathcart. The river flows generally west southwest, joined by one minor tributary before reaching its confluence with the Bombala River near the town of Bombala. The river descends 105 metres (344 ft) over its 26 kilometres (16 mi) course, flowing through the northern boundary of the Coolumbooka Nature Reserve.

The river is impounded by Coolumbooka Weir that provides water supply to the town of Bombala.

== See also ==
- Rivers of New South Wales
- List of rivers of New South Wales (A–K)
- List of rivers of Australia
