= Pearl Beach, New South Wales =

Coordinates: 33°32′31″S 151°18′29″E

Pearl Beach
- Suburb
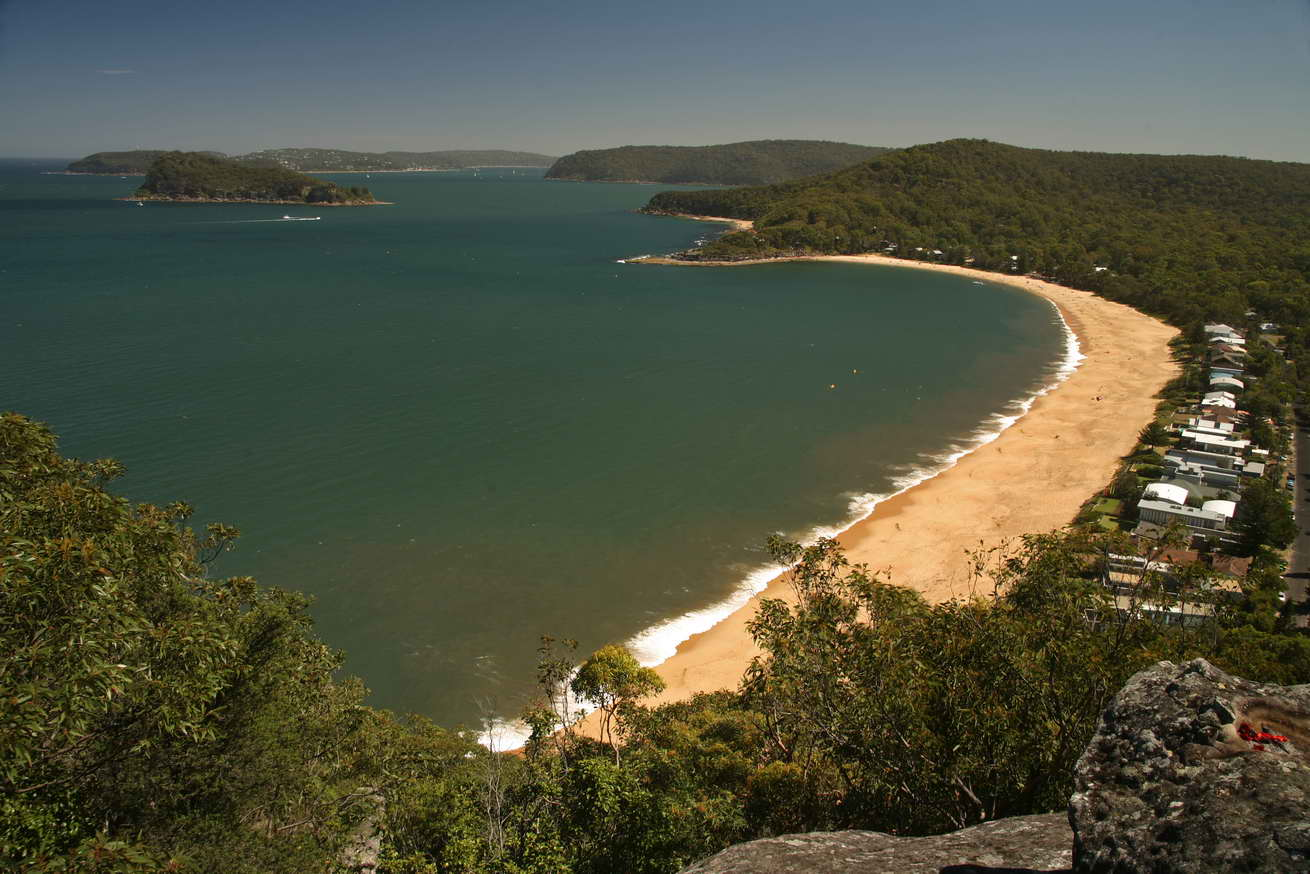
- Pearl Beach from Mount Ettalong, showing nearby Lion Island (New South Wales) and Pittwater in the distance
- Interactive map of Pearl Beach
- Country: Australia
- State: New South Wales
- City: Central Coast
- LGA: Central Coast Council
- Location: 21 km (13 mi) S of Gosford; 9 km (5.6 mi) S of Woy Woy; 90 km (56 mi) N of Sydney

Government
  - State electorate: Gosford
  - Federal division: Robertson

Area
  - Total: 1.2 km^{2} (0.46 sq mi)
- Elevation: 9 m (30 ft)

Population
  - Total: 536 (2016 census)
  - Density: 447/km^{2} (1,160/sq mi)
- Postcode: 2256
- Parish: Patonga
Suburbs around Pearl Beach
Brisbane Water National Park	Umina Beach	Broken Bay
Brisbane Water National Park	Pearl Beach	Broken Bay
Patonga	Hawkesbury River	Lion Island

Pearl Beach is a suburb of Central Coast Council on the Central Coast of New South Wales, Australia. Pearl Beach was assigned 'suburb' status by the Geographical Names Board of NSW on 25 October 1991.

== History ==
On 2 March 1788 Captain Arthur Phillip sailed north from Sydney Cove, Port Jackson, to the inlet described by Captain James Cook in 1770 as a "broken land" (id est Broken Bay). As entered in their journals:

- "We slept in the boat that night within a rocky point in the north-west part of the bay (which is very extensive) as the native tho very friendly appeared to be numerous", Gov. Capt. A. Phillip R.N..
- "At 9 at night moored the boats in a cove on the N. side of the bay off which the surf broke violently... They were met by a great number of the natives men, women and children... They were all very friendly", Lieut. Wm. Bradley R.N. March 1788.

== Geography ==
Located south of Umina Beach, being separated from it by a ridge upon which sits Mount Ettalong at a height of 56 metres (184 ft). It is bounded on the west and south by Brisbane Water National Park, and on the east by Broken Bay. Green Point, with Paul Landa Reserve, adjoins the southern end of the beach. The bay provides an example of a logarithmic spiral beach.

== Population ==
Pearl Beach had a population of 510 people at the time of the 2021 Census, with females comprising 53.7% and males 46.3%. The median age of residents was 64 years, compared with the NSW median of 39 and the Australian median of 38, reflecting Pearl Beach's character as a retirement and sea-change destination.

Pearl Beach is predominantly Anglo-Celtic in ancestry and highly English-speaking. The most commonly reported ancestries were English (51.0%), Australian (24.5%), Irish (16.9%), and Scottish (14.5%). Aboriginal and/or Torres Strait Islander people represented 0.6% of the population (3 people), compared to 3.4% across NSW. 67.6% of residents were born in Australia, with England (8.4%) and New Zealand (3.3%) the next most common countries of birth. English was the only language used at home for 87.8% of residents, significantly higher than the NSW average of 67.6%.

== Swimming ==
The south end of the beach is placid, sheltered by a rocky point and Lion Island and is favoured by most visitors as a swimming spot. The north end of the beach is known for rough surf and is unofficially called "the dumpers". The dumpers, excluding the roughest waves at the far north end of the beach, are a popular bodysurfing spot for strong, confident swimmers, except during particularly rough surf or at king tide. Swimmers risk getting violently pounded onto the sand by a wave, or "chundered" (usually kayaking terminology) by waves dumping into a deep trench along the shoreline, but can generally avoid getting chundered by moving towards dry land or ducking under the break of the wave and swimming back to shore in smaller waves.

In 2014, five-year-old Chayce Kofe drowned after he was swept off the shore by a large wave. Gosford City Council continues to oppose danger signs despite calls from the local Member Kathy Smith to erect them.

== See also ==
Rip current

== Environment ==
Pearl Beach village is located within the National Trust of Australia's Broken Bay Entrance Landscape Conservation Area.

=== Awards ===
- 4 November 2009, Pearl Beach was declared the Central Coast regional winner of the NSW Keep Australia Beautiful Clean Beach Challenge while also winning the Community Partnerships and Action Award. Pearl Beach also took home a highly commended award in the Environmental Protection category.
- 9 December 2010, due to an absence of a formal select programme, Pearl Beach was successful with a nomination to represent New South Wales in the Keep Australia Beautiful Clean Beaches Award for 2010–11.

== Community groups ==
- Pearl Beach Progress Association

The Pearl Beach Progress Association was established in 1929 and grew out of informal gatherings of residents to discuss local problems and community projects. Today the Pearl Beach Progress Association promotes the best interests of the village, protects and enhances our wonderful natural environment and manages the historic Memorial Community Hall. Membership is available to anyone who is 16 years of age or older and lives in Pearl Beach or are owners of property in Pearl Beach, and the immediate families of such persons.

- Pearl Beach Rural Fire Brigade

A volunteer firefighting brigade under the NSW Rural Fire Service, formed in 1953. The Station is located at 39 Emerald Avenue.

== Community events ==
Since 2006, Opera in the Arboretum has been performed annually in March in the Crommelin Native Arboretum. The event is organised by the Rotary Club of Woy Woy and features performances by leading Australian opera identities. All proceeds are given to charities and Rotary projects.

In 2026, Pearl Beach played host to Australia's first ever festival of porridge: the Pearly Spurtle porridge competition. The event was held at Pearl Beach Memorial Community Hall with a total of 18 contestants participating in the porridge making competition; with the winner former cafe owner Robert Reid set to represent Australia in the 2027 Golden Spurtle World Porridge Making Championships in Carrbridge, Scotland.

== Residential development ==
Residential development in Pearl Beach is governed by the Central Coast Development Control Plan 2022. The aims of the Development Control Plan (DCP) are to preserve, improve and restore the special natural character of Pearl Beach, and to ensure that further development is consistent with the unique qualities and character of Pearl Beach as a significant feature of the Central Coast. It applies to all properties in the village of Pearl Beach, including, proposed buildings and major alterations and additions to existing buildings. The DCP superseded Gosford City Council's policies for Pearl Beach after the amalgamation of Gosford and Wyong councils in 2016, which formed the Central Coast Council.

== Infrastructure ==
=== Road ===
Pearl Beach Drive is the only vehicular access road to the town.

There is pedestrian access is via the former Pearl Beach Road, also sometimes referred to as Cliff Road, which, nowadays, is a rocky unstable walking track that runs 30 feet above the shoreline around the base of the Mount Ettalong cliff via Umina Point. Pearl Beach Road is Heritage Listed, notably as a Section 2: Items listed by Local Government and State agencies.

Vehicular access to Pearl Beach has been problematic ever since motorised traffic was given access to the town, some events in this long saga include:

- In 1925 Pearl Beach Road was designed and constructed as the main vehicular access road to Pearl Beach.
- By December 1935, Pearl Beach Road had been closed to vehicles. As reported at the time: "The engineer of the Woy Woy Shire Council has reported to the touring department of the N.R.M.A. that during the summer holidays cars will be able to reach Pearl Beach from Ettalong by way of the new road. It is necessary for motorists to go along the old road from Ettalong to a point where a turntable has been constructed and a notice gives Warning that the road ahead is closed to traffic. The road over the hill is still under construction, and travelling conditions are not good, but, with care, tourists should be able to travel to Pearl Beach without difficulty."
- In June 1936, the Pearl Beach Progress Association sent correspondence to Woy Woy Shire Council objecting to the council's decision to build a road to Patonga which would not go through Pearl Beach. A petition against the proposal was forwarded to the NSW Minister for Lands.
- By April 1938, the Pearl Beach Progress Association had decided to pursue access to the town via water rather than road. As reported at the time: "Pearl Beach Progress Association has decided by a unanimous vote to demand an £800 wharf to facilitate launch connection with Patonga and Hawkesbury River railway station, in preference to a properly graded road connection with Woy Woy. It was expected that with a wharf large coastal vessels would come to Pearl Beach on their excursion trips from Sydney and Newcastle."
- In February 1939, Pearl Beach Road was closed by Woy Woy Shire Council because a portion of the road had been washed away and two youths had been killed on it by falling over the cliffs. As reported at the time: "Although two experts stated that the road could be reconstructed for £2,000 and £4,800 respectively, a report by the shire engineer estimates that cost at £8,981. The Pearl Beach Progress Association will be advised of the cost, and as the rate necessary would be about 1 [shilling] in the [pound], the suggestion to replace the road is not likely to meet with approval."
- In August 2010, Gosford City Council commenced stabilisation and reconstruction of sections of Mount Ettalong Road and Patonga Drive. Works were organised to ensure minimal traffic disruptions during morning and afternoon peak hours with delays of up to 15 minutes during other times. Consideration was given to the bus timetable and emergency vehicles.

=== Rock Pool ===
In 1926 construction of the Rock Pool, located at the southern end of the beach, adjoining Green Point, commenced. Once completed in 1928, C. R. Staples and Co. used it in promotional material to help sell land. Up until 1950, the pool suffered a pollution problem from its own amenities block that used open uncovered sanitary pans. Design and maintenance problems have plague the pool from the start. Nonetheless, many people have and still enjoy the rock pool. During 2010, the rock pool was closed for 4 months whilst major renovations were carried out.

=== Electricity ===
Plans to provide Pearl Beach with electricity were given an approval on 31 December 1936. Mr. R. Franki, consulting electrical engineer to the Woy Woy Council, was instructed to proceed with construction after the necessary number of guarantees had been signed by the residents.

=== Sports facilities ===
Two tennis courts and a narrow artificial turf bowling green are located in Opal Close, bookings required. Lap swimming is available at the rock pool located at the southern end of the beach.

== Notable residents ==
- Minard Crommelin MBE (1881–1972), postmistress and environmental conservationist, lived in Pearl Beach between 1939 and 1972.
