= Logarithmic spiral beach =

Type of beach with spiral shaped shoreline

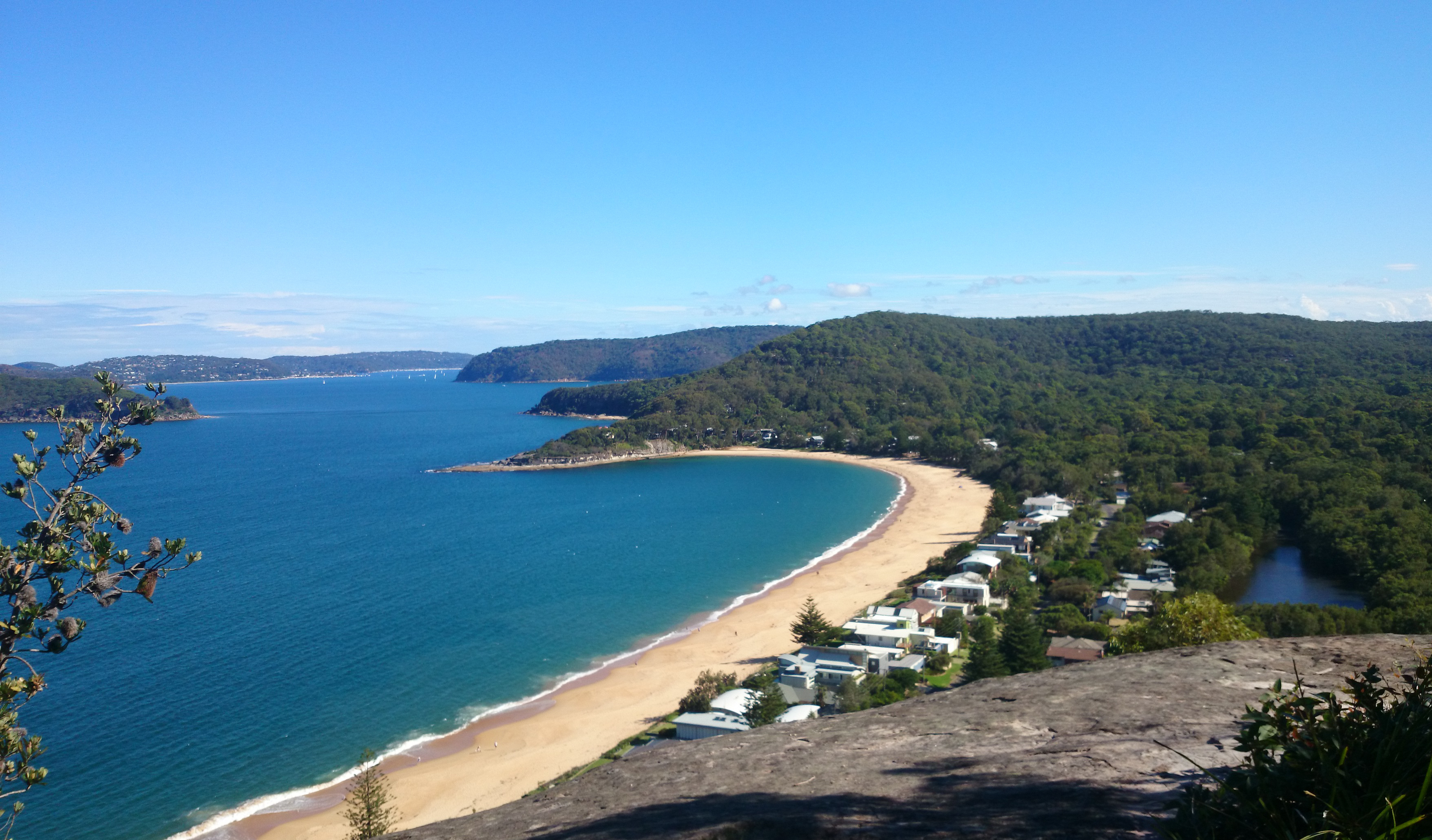
Pearl Beach, New South Wales

A logarithmic spiral beach is a type of beach which develops in the direction under which it is sheltered by a headland, in an area called the shadow zone. It is shaped like a logarithmic spiral when seen in a map, plan view, or aerial photograph. These beaches are also commonly referred to as half heart beach, crenulate-shaped bay, or headland-bay beach.

== Logarithmic spiral relation ==
Logarithmic Spiral

The logarithmic spiral can be determined using the equation (written in polar coordinates):

$$r = e^{\theta \cot \alpha}$$

where:

$\theta$ = the angle of rotation, is located between two lines drawn from the origin to any two points on the spiral.

$r$ = the ratio of the lengths between two lines that extend out from the origin. The two lines are given as $R_O$ and $R$. So $r$ also equals the ratio $R/R_O$.

$\alpha$ = the angle between any line $R$ from the origin and the line tangent to the spiral which is at the point where line $R$ intersects the spiral. $\alpha$ is a constant for any given logarithmic spiral.

== Spiral development ==
This type of beach forms due to the refraction of approaching waves and their diffraction by an upcoast headland. The approaching wave front curves as a result of wave diffraction at the headland, which in turn causes the shoreline to bend and yield a log spiral shape. Log spiral beaches are often on swell-dominated coasts where waves generally approach the shoreline from one main direction at an oblique angle. The oblique approaching waves refract and diffract into the "shadow zone" which can be considered a relatively sheltered hook of beach behind the headland. Increase in sediment size, wave height, berm height, and swash zone gradient from the up coast headland generally characterizes the concave seaward curved part of the beach.

== Examples ==
- Birch Bay, Washington, US
- Restinga Beach, Isla Margarita, Venezuela
- Half Moon Bay, California, US
- Pearl Beach, New South Wales, Australia
- Provincetown Harbor, Massachusetts, US
