= Returned and Services League of Australia =

Australian veterans service organisation

- Abbreviation: RSL
- Formation: 16 June 1916; 110 years ago
- Type: Ex-service organisation
- Registration no.: ACN 008 488 097
- Legal status: Charity
- Members: 153,000+ (2025)
- Patron: His Majesty King Charles III
- National Chairman: David Nathan
- National President: Major Peter Tinley, AM
- CEO: Phil Winter
- Affiliations: Royal Commonwealth Ex-Services League (RCEL)
- Website: www.rslaustralia.org
- Formerly called: 1916: Returned Sailors and Soldiers Imperial League of Australia; 1940: Returned Sailors', Soldiers' and Airmen's Imperial League of Australia; 1965: Returned Services League of Australia (to 1990).

The Returned & Services League of Australia, also known as the RSL, RSL Australia and RSLA, (Note: The league's corporate entity is The Returned & Services League of Australia Limited, a company limited by guarantee and registered as a charity with the Australian Charities and Not-for-profits Commission.) has the primary purpose of promoting the interests and welfare of current and former serving members of the Australian Defence Force, as well as their dependants. As of 2025, it had more than 150,000 members. Through its branches and affiliated local clubs across Australia, the RSL offers camaraderie as well as direct financial aid, mental health support, housing assistance, and help with employment and transitioning to civilian life. It also assists veterans in navigating entitlements and benefits from the Department of Veterans' Affairs. It organises and supports major events such as ANZAC Day and Remembrance Day to honour and preserve the memory of the men and women who served in the defence of Australia. The RSL also lobbies Australian federal and state governments on policies and issues affecting veterans' welfare, and advocates for the broader defence community.

== History ==
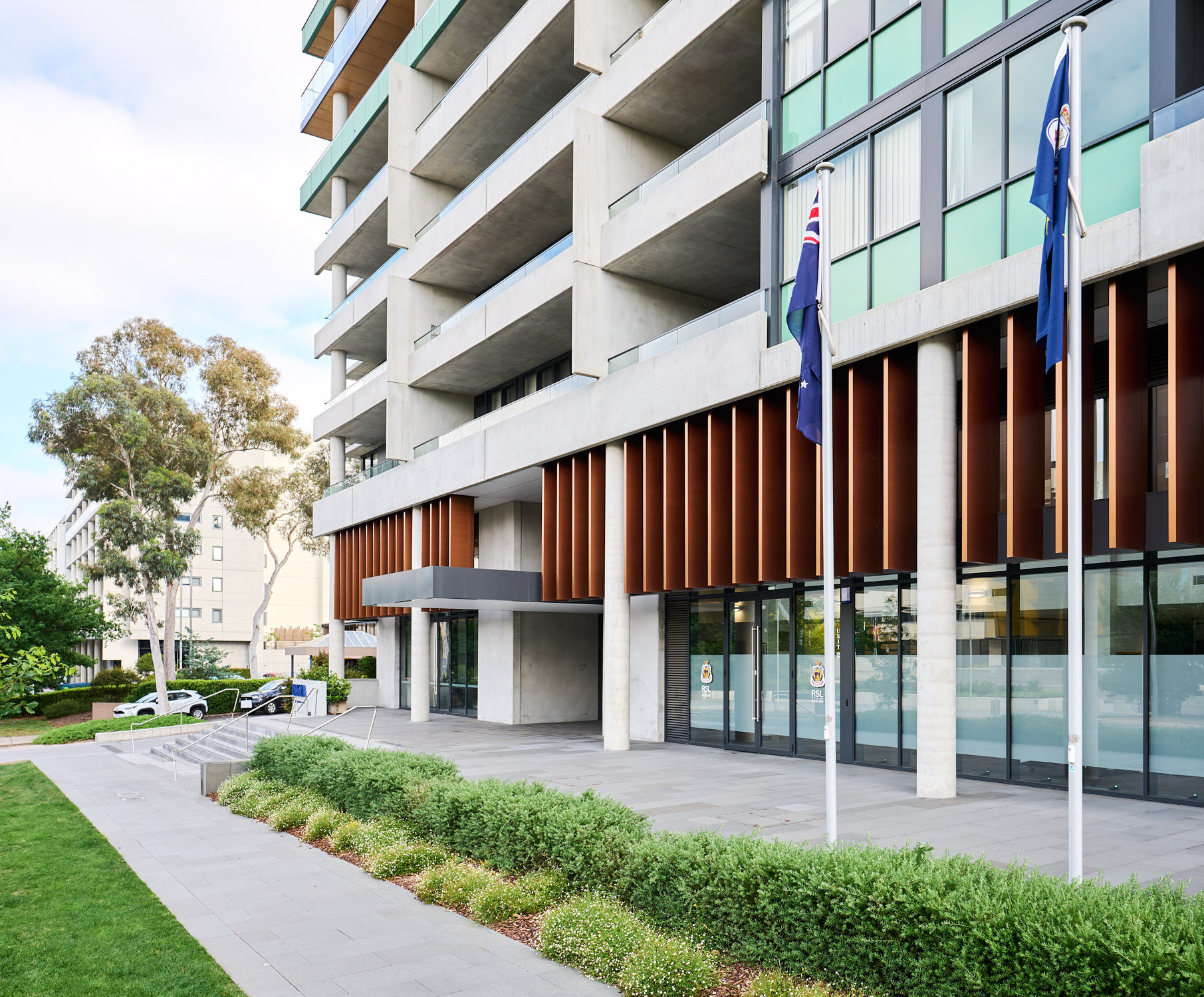
National Office of the RSL on the ground floor of 81 Constitution Avenue, Canberra, near Russell Offices – headquarters of the Australian Defence Force and Department of Defence

The League was formed in 1916 in response to the lack of a unified approach with Australian repatriation facilities and medical services for those returning from World War I. On 6 June 1916, a meeting of representatives from New South Wales, Queensland, South Australia and Victoria resolved to form the Returned Sailors and Soldiers Imperial League of Australia (RSSILA). (Note: A Tasmanian representative was unable to attend but Tasmania nevertheless joined with Queensland, South Australia and Victoria as a founding member of the League. New South Wales was admitted to the League the following year and Western Australia in 1918. In 1927, the Australian Capital Territory formed a branch and was admitted.) Their intention was to lobby for better benefits, treatment and welfare of veterans and serving members of the Defence Force and to preserve the health, wellbeing and security of Australia and the Australian way of life. Before then, state Returned Service Associations had lobbied for better conditions for returned service people in their respective states. The League soon became, and remains, the nation's largest ex-service organisation.

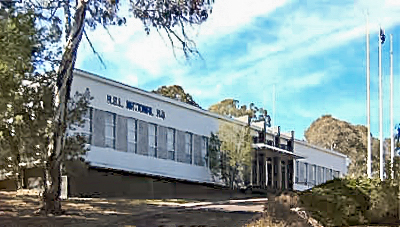
The RSL's national office from 1963 to 2011 was on the same site in Constitution Avenue before it was redeveloped

During the inter-war period 1919 to 1939, the RSSILA was recognised as the appropriate body to represent the interests of returned Australian service personnel in exchange for extending political cooperation to the Nationalist Party of Prime Minister Stanley Bruce. The RSSILA was noted for its right-wing politics, in 1919 drawing on its membership to form a 2,000-strong paramilitary force called the "Army to fight Bolshevism", and permitting various right-wing Australian militia groups access to its membership lists to convince returned servicemen to join them. In 1923, the League adopted the motto, "The price of liberty is eternal vigilance". After the Second World War, with K. M. Bolton as president of the powerful NSW branch, the League published antisemitic political cartoons encouraging the Australian government and Minister for Immigration Arthur Calwell to stem the flow of displaced Eastern Europeans, particularly German Jews. In 1948, World War I veteran and politician Fred Paterson was expelled from the organisation for being a communist.

In 1940, the name of the League changed to the Returned Sailors', Soldiers' and Airmen's Imperial League of Australia (RSSAILA). It changed in 1965 to the Returned Services League of Australia (RSL) and in 1990 to the Returned & Services League of Australia. Before that time, those whose service was limited to defending Darwin from Japanese bombing in World War II were not eligible to join, as they had never left Australia and thus could not be "returned".

National presidents since the league's inception are as follows:

National presidents
Order	Rank	Name	Postnominals	Held office
1	Lieutenant Colonel	William Kinsey Bolton	CBE, VD	1916–1919
2	Captain	Sir Gilbert Dyett	CMG	1919–1946
3	Colonel	Sir Eric Millhouse	KC	1946–1950
4	Sergeant	Sir George Holland	CBE, MM	1950–1960
5	Lieutenant Colonel	Sir Arthur Lee	KBE, MC & Bar	1960–1974
6	Brigadier	Sir William Hall	KBE, DSO, ED	1974–1978
7	Captain	Sir William Keys	AC, OBE, MC	1978–1988
8	Brigadier (Retd)	Alf Garland	AM	1988–1993
9	Major General (Retd)	William Brian "Digger" James	AC, MBE, MC	1993–1997
10	Major General (Retd)	Peter Phillips	AO, MC	1997–2003
11	Major General (Retd)	Bill Crews	AO	2003–2009
12	Rear Admiral (Retd)	Ken Doolan	AO	2009–2016
13	Major	Rod White	AM, RFD	2016–2017
14	Warrant Officer	Robert Dick		2017–2018
15	Major General (Retd)	Greg Melick	AO, RFD, SC (Note: The post-nominal "SC" applies both to the bravery decoration, Star of Courage, and the legal practitioner title, senior counsel. Greg Melick is a senior counsel.)	2019–2025
16	Major	Peter Tinley	AM	2025–

== Governance ==
The objects of the League remain relatively unchanged from its first incorporation. The League expresses its vision as:

Together, our vision is to help Australia's veterans and Defence families enjoy better opportunities in all aspects of their lives.

The League's mission is:

To provide on behalf of Australia's Veterans and Defence families national advocacy, supportive and coordinated national programs and activities, more funding and optimised management of the RSL brand.

RSL Australia is organised as a federation of its independent state branches, which in turn consist of 1107 sub-branches (as of 2022) delivering diverse services tailored to the priorities and needs of local veterans. The national office, in Canberra, shapes the national agenda on veterans' affairs on behalf of the state branches, provides national advocacy, and supports and coordinates national programs and activities.

The corporate entity underpinning RSL Australia is The Returned & Services League of Australia Limited – a public company limited by guarantee registered with the Australian Charities and Not-for-profits Commission and endorsed to access GST and income tax concessions. The company is governed by a board comprising the national president and deputy national president, chairman, a director from each of the seven state/territory branches, and three independent non-member directors.

== Activities ==
The League conducts a diverse range of programs and initiatives to serve its current membership and the next generation of veterans and their families. In 2022, it reported:

- deep involvement with the Royal Commission into Defence and Veteran Suicide: attending hearings around the country and making extensive, detailed submissions and comments on behalf of the veteran community, and implementing projects to address some of the known issues
- initiation of an inaugural national Ex-service Organisation (ESO) Forum aimed at driving better coordination within the ESO sector and bringing together the collective thinking of Australia's leading ESOs
- pro-active advocacy for veterans, including commentary on many current issues such as calls for government assistance for Afghan interpreters, demand-driven funding, mental health support, and proactive medical treatment for veterans
- major observances of ANZAC Day and Remembrance Day, and support of many other anniversaries and commemorations, including the 80th anniversary of the Kokoda Campaign
- advocacy in helping to shape the national discussion of security, veterans, services and defence preparedness
- cooperation with the Department of Veterans' Affairs and the Department of Defence, particularly around the subject of transition into civilian life
- delivering and coordinating Enhanced Employment Services to Veterans, a national employment program for veterans under Australian Government grant funding
- reactivation of RSL Active to better coordinate sports and recreational activities across the League.

== Influence ==
The influence of the League derives from its founding days organising rituals for ANZAC Day dawn services and marches, and Remembrance Day commemorations. In addition to pressing for benefits for veterans, the organisation entered other areas of political debate. The RSL was politically conservative, Anglophilic, and monarchist.

In the 1970s and 1980s, many defence force personnel, including veterans of the Vietnam War, found the RSL – whose members had predominantly served in the Second World War – generally unwelcoming and disdaining of their service. Since the turn of the century, with the number of Second World War veterans in the RSL dwindling, Vietnam veterans and their contemporaries, along with ex-servicemen's wives, have become mainstays of the League.

The focus of the RSL has been on the welfare of Australian men and women who have served in the armed forces. It has advocated for veterans' entitlements and the protection of former battlefields. Usually RSL members ensure that those who have served their country are commemorated by notifying funeral information and handing out poppies at the funeral.

== Symbolism ==
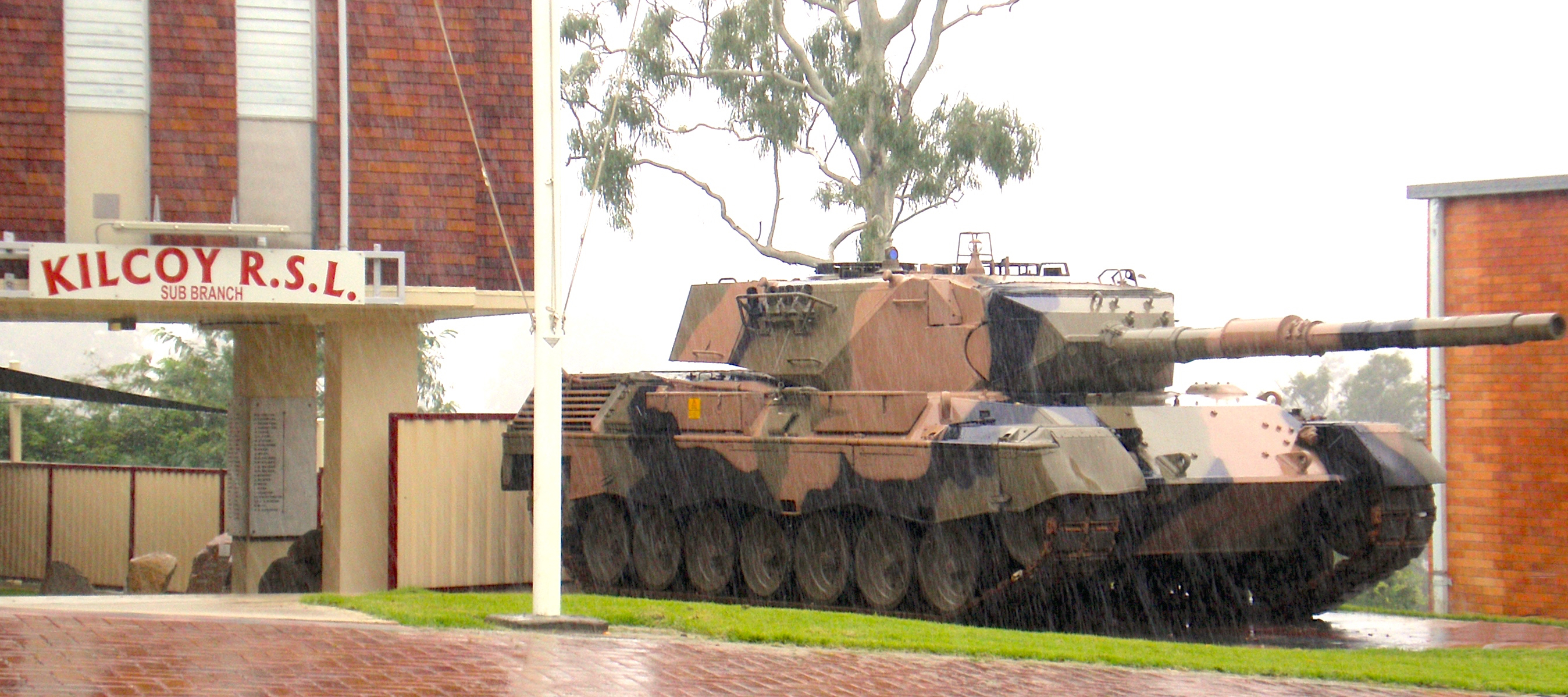
Many RSL sub-branches display redundant military hardware, such as this Leopard 1 tank outside the Kilcoy sub-branch in Queensland

The League's badge is a symbol of readiness at all times to render service to the country and to former comrades. It is an offence in most states and territories for non-members to wear the RSL badge. (Note: Specifically, it is an offence for an individual to wear an RSL badge (a) that has not been issued specifically to them by the RSL, and (b) unless they are entitled to wear the badge, at that time, under the rules of the League: Returned Servicemen's Badges Act 1952 (SA), the Returned Servicemen's Badges Act 1953 (WA), the Returned Servicemen's Badges Act 1955 (Tas), the Returned Servicemen's Badges Act 1956 (Qld), the Returned Servicemen's Badges Act 1956 (Vic), the Returned Servicemen's Badges Act 1960 (ACT), and the Discharged Servicemen's Badges Act 1964 (NSW).) The shield is symbolic of the protection which the RSL gives to its members, their dependents, and widows/widowers and orphans of those who paid the supreme sacrifice. At the top of the badge is a crown, signifying allegiance to the Crown. Below the crown are the national flowers of Australia, Wales, England, Scotland and Ireland: the wattle, leek, rose, thistle, and shamrock. In the centre of the badge are a sailor, soldier, airman and service woman marching with their arms linked, symbolising friendship and the unity of all services and all ranks in comradeship. The red of the badge symbolises the blood ties of war. The white background stands for the purity of motive and the rendering of service without personal gain. The blue is a symbol of willingness to render service to a comrade anywhere under the sky.

== Branches and sub-branches ==
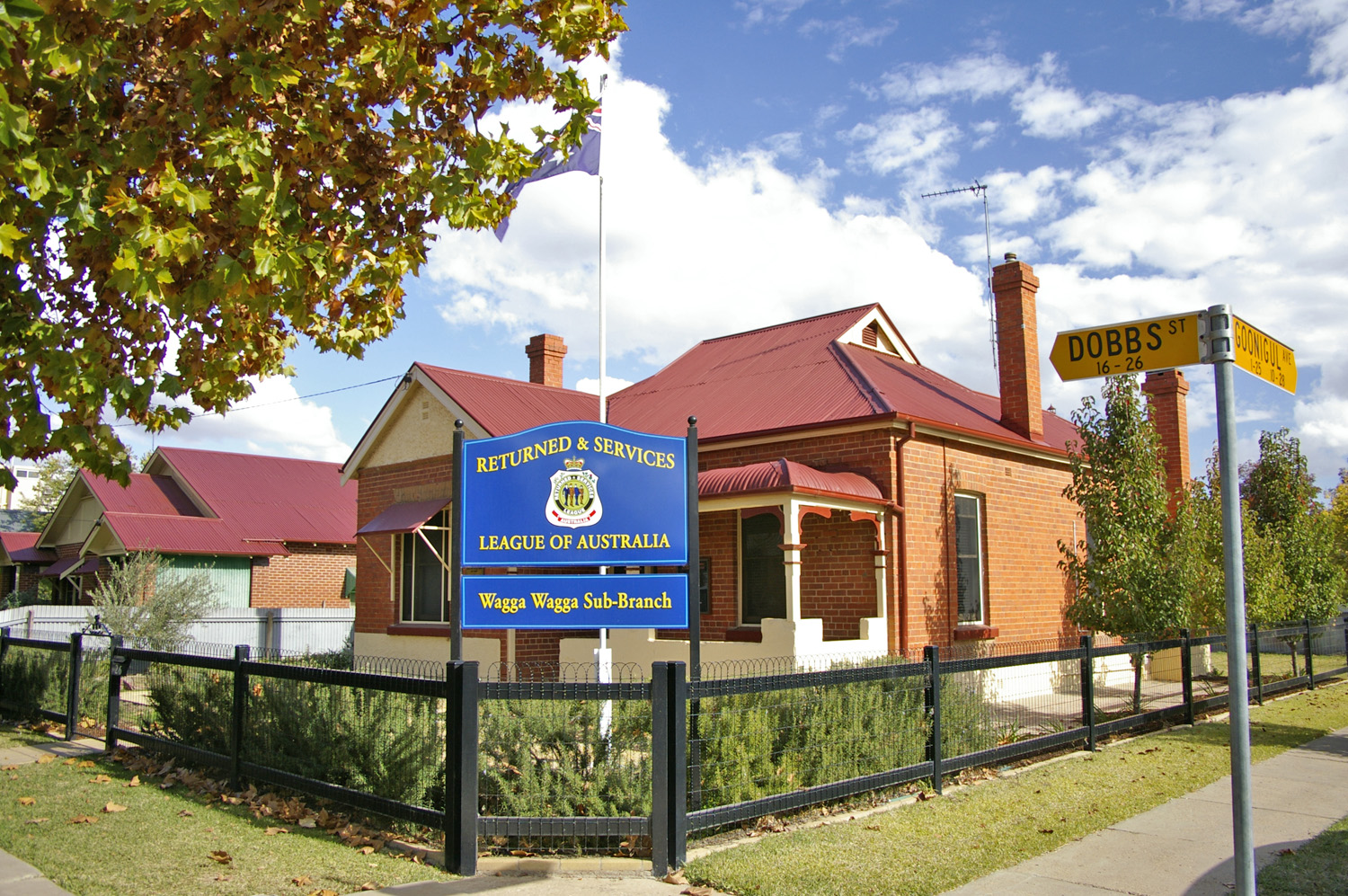
RSL sub-branches often operate from small suburban premises, such as here in Wagga Wagga, in contrast to the usually large public licensed "RSL club" buildings in New South Wales, which in that state are not owned by the RSL

Each state and territory has a branch of the League, with similar hierarchical structures. Within each branch is a series of districts and sub-branches that serve the interests of members in a particular geographic area.

The naming of these branches and sub-branches can be confused with the commercial entities generally called RSL Clubs. Ownership and operation of RSL and Services clubs differ from state to state. For example, RSL NSW and its sub-branches do not own or operate any registered clubs, nor do they own or operate poker machines; however, RSL Victoria sub-branches do.

=== Controversy (RSL New South Wales councillors) ===
On 4 October 2016, the Sydney Morning Herald and ABC News reported that RSL national president Rod White, a retired major of the Australian Army Reserve, received a share in nearly $1 million of consulting fees paid by an arm of the League, RSL LifeCare, and failed to disclose conflicts of interest. Mr White denied any wrongdoing and was quoted as saying, when questioned by an ABC News reporter: "I believe I have personally fulfilled my obligations legally and ethically and I'm just absolutely surprised at your questioning of my integrity in that regard".

In October 2016, legal advice commissioned by the RSL's New South Wales Branch indicated RSL New South Wales councillors, including Mr White, may have broken the law by receiving a share in $1 million of consulting fees while holding a voluntary position in the veteran's group: "It is possible, but not certain, that in doing so they did not meet one or more of their duties and obligations, or contravened the law." Subsequently, calls were made for Mr White to step aside in order to rebuild public trust in the League.

On 7 November 2016, ABC News reported Mr White as being likely to stand down pending an investigation into the consultancy fee payments, and that new documents obtained by ABC revealed that the quantum of consultancy fees paid was "far greater than originally thought – totalling more than $2 million since 2007".

On Remembrance Day 2016, ABC News reported that the New South Wales Branch of the RSL was at risk of losing its charity status as a result of the payment scandal and that the Australian Charities and Not-For-Profits Commission had written to the RSL "outlining its concerns that the league may not be meeting its obligations as a charity" and warning, as a worst case, that "the commission may use its powers to revoke the league's charity status if it finds evidence that the rules have been broken".

The RSL acting national president, Robert Dick, was subsequently reported as saying the league would be working with "regulatory bodies to deliver an appropriate corporate governance structure to ensure there is no maladministration in the NSW Branch. We are determined to expose any wrongdoing".

In March 2017, Mr White resigned as President of the RSL; he had held the position for eight months.

== Licensed clubs ==
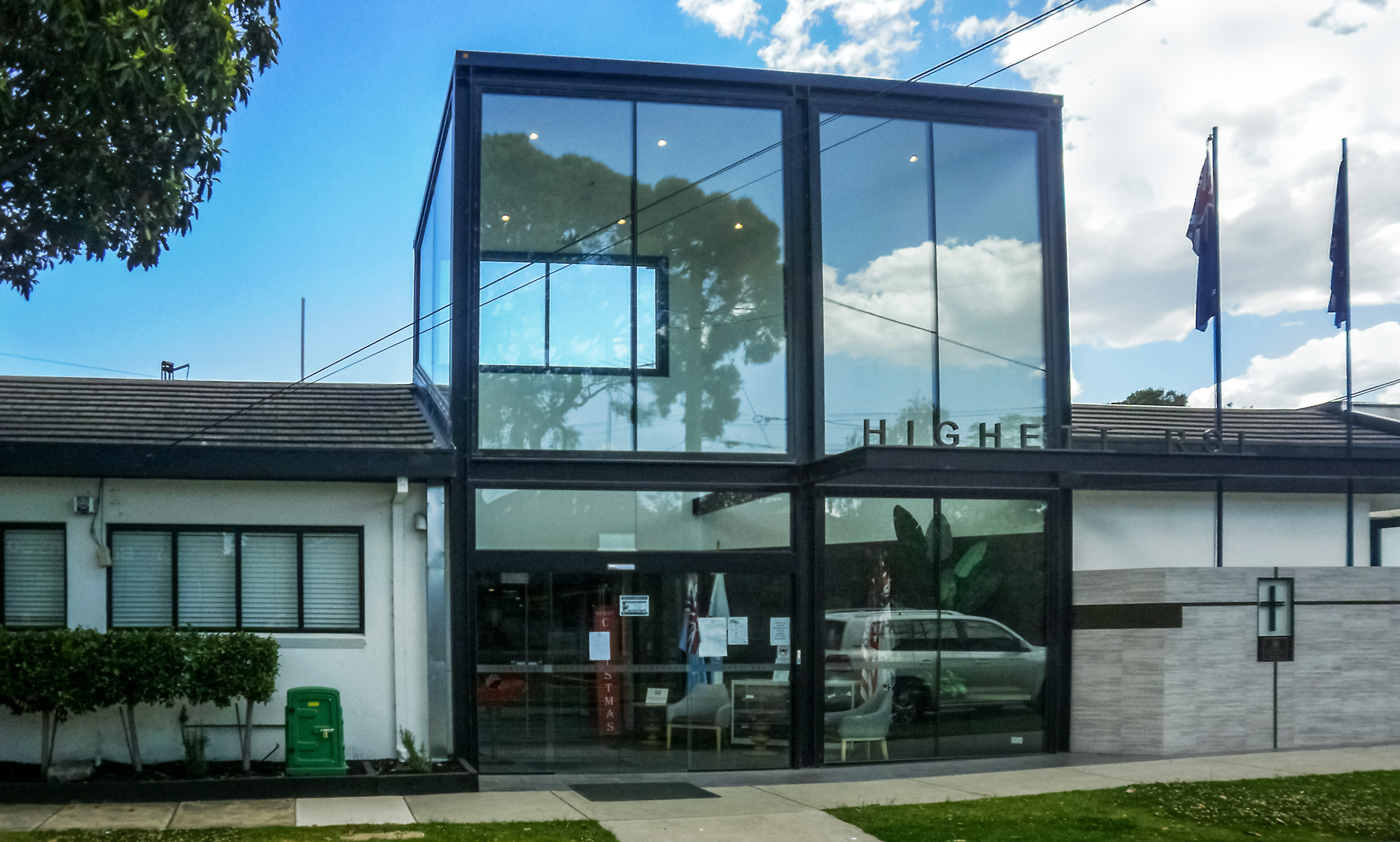
The Highett RSL Sub-Branch Club in suburban Melbourne, is one of more than 200 RSL and services clubs in Victoria

Licensed clubs were formed as commercial activities to initially provide services by sub-branches to their members, including providing an environment for the protection and promotion of the ideals of the ANZAC spirit and heritage. The venues were established to provide hospitality for war veterans and a place for comradeship. Often they were located on land granted by the state government. Over time these commercial entities, known generally as RSL Clubs (but also called Ex-Services, Memorial, Legion or other similar names) generated profits and often donated to local community services.

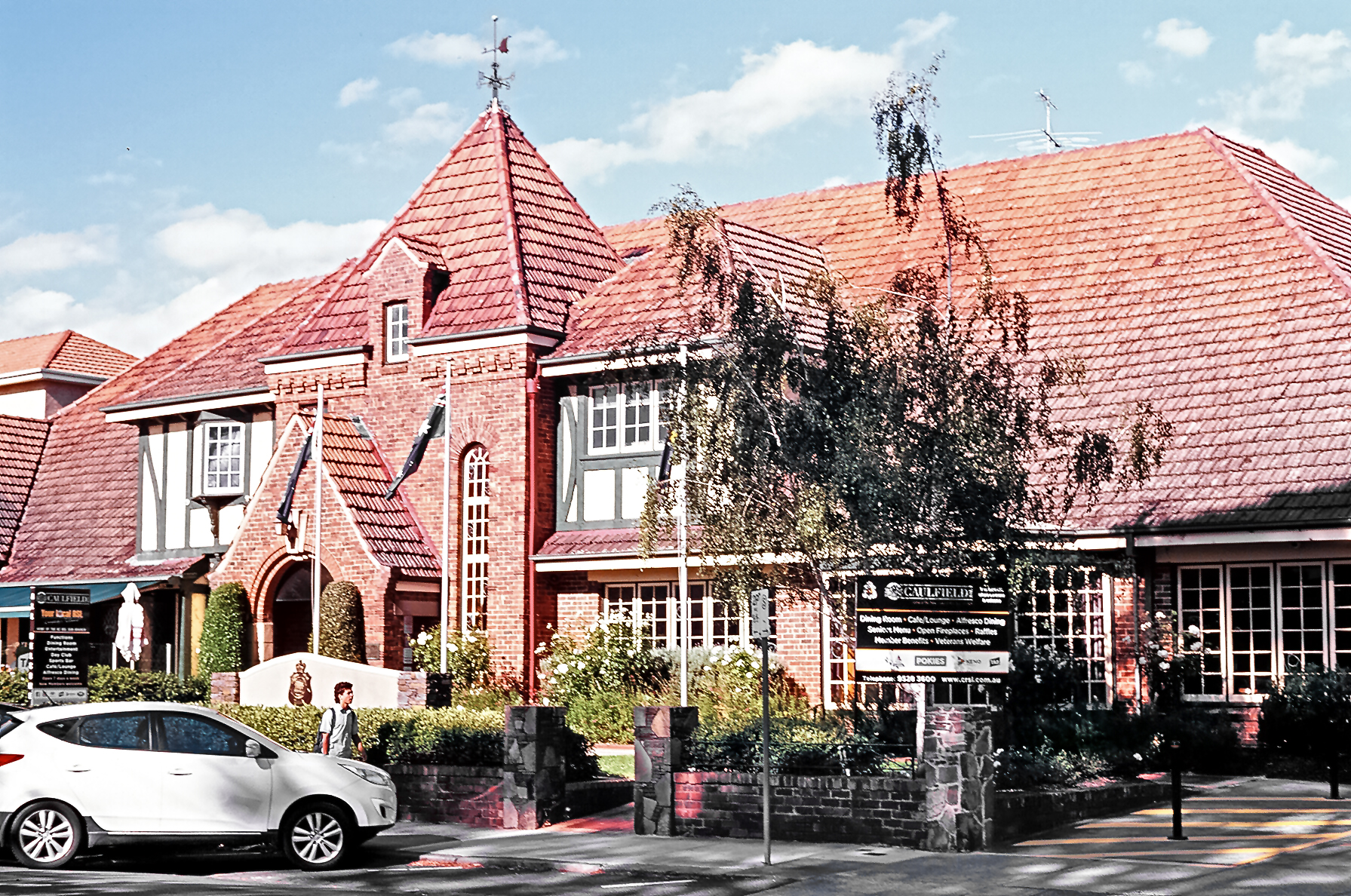
Caulfield RSL building, in Elsternwick, Melbourne

The membership base of the licensed clubs, totalling more than a million, differs significantly from membership of the Returned and Services League (RSL). Membership of the League does not automatically confer rights of entry or membership to a licensed club but in some jurisdictions clubs extend honorary membership to serving members of the ADF.

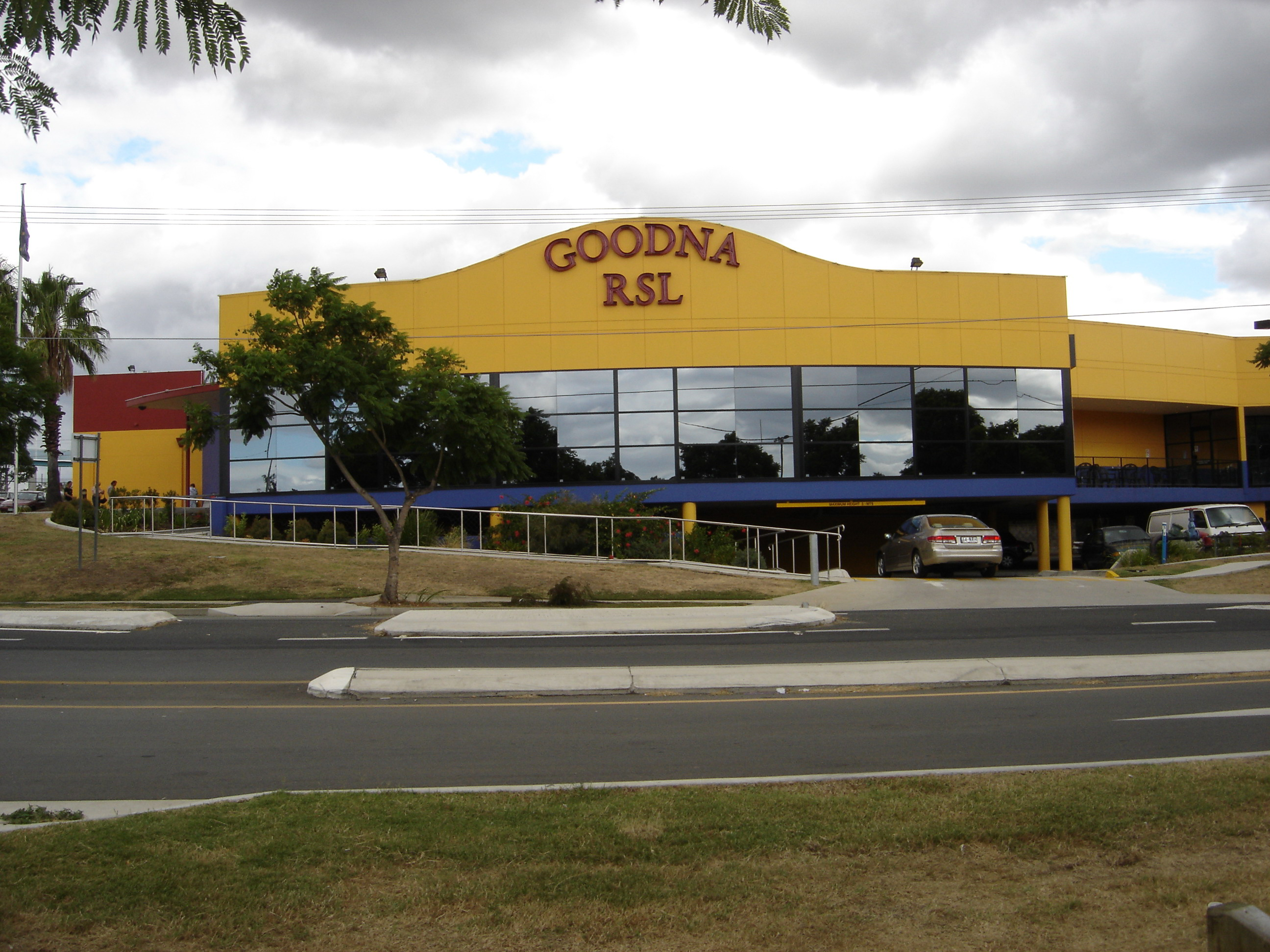
The RSL licensed club in Goodna, Queensland

Licensed clubs operating under the RSL name usually have bar and dining facilities for their members and guests, and sometimes have extensive gambling areas. Each evening at 6.00 pm the Ode of Remembrance is read, followed by one minute's silence to honour those who died serving their country.

RSL NSW and its sub-Branches do not own or operate any registered clubs, nor do they own or operate poker machines.

== Other commercial activities ==
=== RSL Care ===
The first RSL home for ex-servicemen was established in 1938. The affiliated organisation, which became RSL Care, had 26 facilities in 2011. Following a merger with the Royal District Nursing Service in Victoria, in 2016 it became RSL Care RDNS Limited, an Australian public company registered as a charity, trading as Bolton Clarke. With more than 28 retirement communities throughout Queensland and New South Wales and several others in development, it was one of Australia's largest providers of retirement living and aged care services.

=== RSL Cabs ===
Operating under a co-operative structure, in 1946 a group of returned servicemen established RSL Ex-Servicemen's Cabs & Co-Operative Members Limited to provide taxi services to Sydney. By the 1950s, the co-operative had expanded to more than 60 drivers. As of 2021 it operated on a commercial basis in which drivers were not required to be members of the League.

=== RSL Art Union ===
Commenced in Queensland in 1956, the RSL Art Union is a lottery that raises funds to provide welfare services to ex-service men and women, their dependents and to other members of the community. A major prize of a luxury waterfront home on Queensland's Gold Coast is usually offered, together with a range of bonus prizes. As of 2011, the RSL Art Union had provided since its inception A$80 million in prizes and had raised more than A$70 million for development and maintenance of RSL nursing homes, hospitals and centres, and retirement complexes for elderly people.

== See also ==
- Remembrance Day

=== Similar veterans' organisations ===
- American Legion
- Australian Legion
- Royal British Legion
- Royal New Zealand Returned and Services Association
- Royal Canadian Legion
- South African Legion
