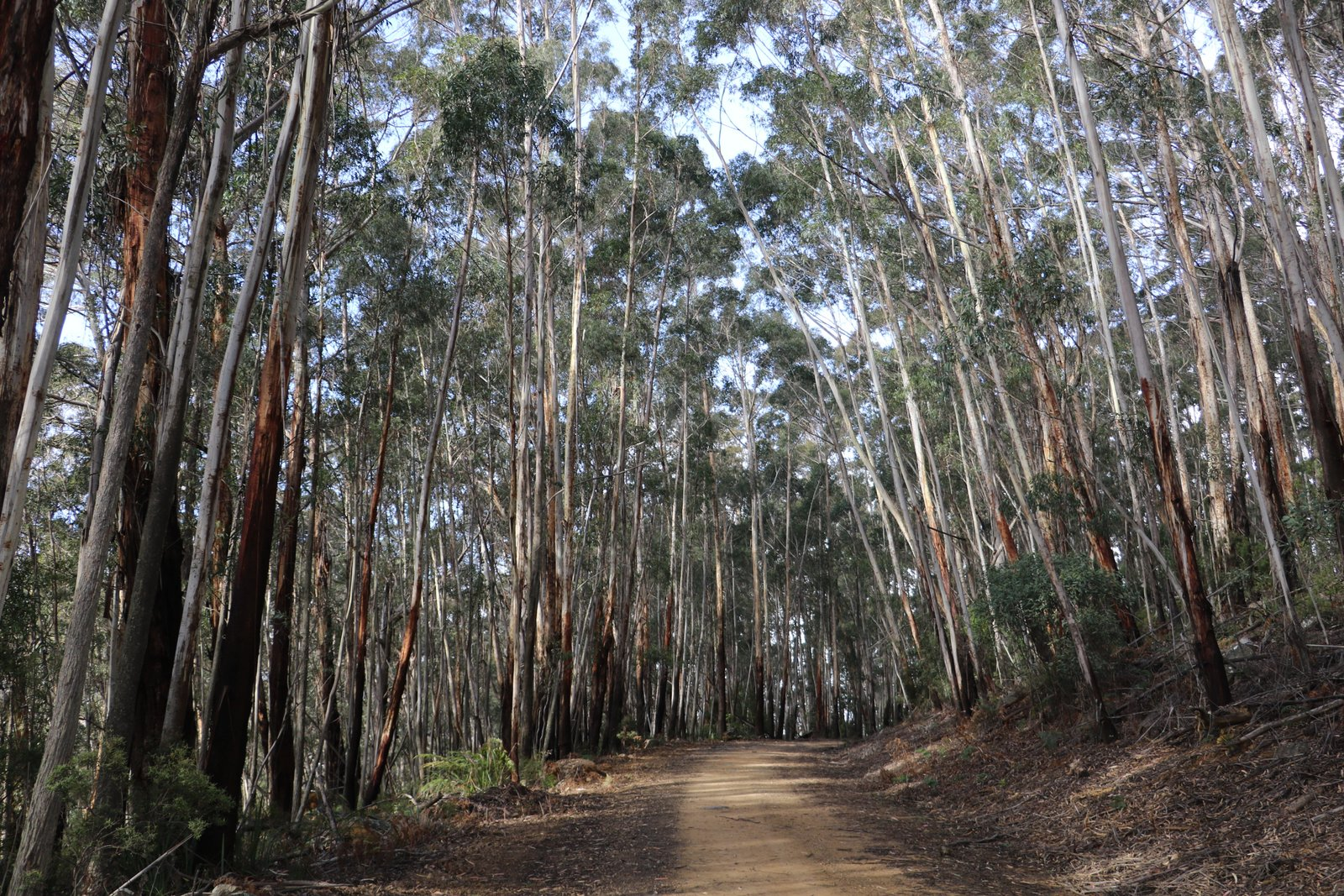
- Eucalyptus fraxinoides on Brown Mountain

Scientific classification
- Kingdom: Plantae
- Clade: Embryophytes
- Clade: Tracheophytes
- Clade: Spermatophytes
- Clade: Angiosperms
- Clade: Eudicots
- Clade: Rosids
- Order: Myrtales
- Family: Myrtaceae
- Genus: Eucalyptus
- Species: E. fraxinoides

Binomial name
- Eucalyptus fraxinoides H.Deane & Maiden

Synonyms
- Eucalyptus fraxinoides H.Deane & Maiden var. fraxinoides; Eucalyptus virgata var. fraxinoides (H.Deane & Maiden) Maiden

= Eucalyptus fraxinoides =

White ash

Species of eucalyptus

Eucalyptus fraxinoides, commonly known as the white ash or white mountain ash, is a medium-sized to tall tree of mountain country and is endemic to south eastern Australia. It has rough, compacted greyish bark on the lower trunk, smooth white bark with scribbles above, lance-shaped adult leaves, flower buds in groups of between seven and eleven, white flowers and barrel-shaped or urn-shaped fruit.

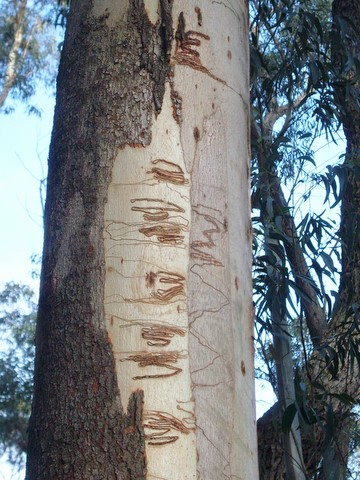
Trunk of tree on Mount Budawang

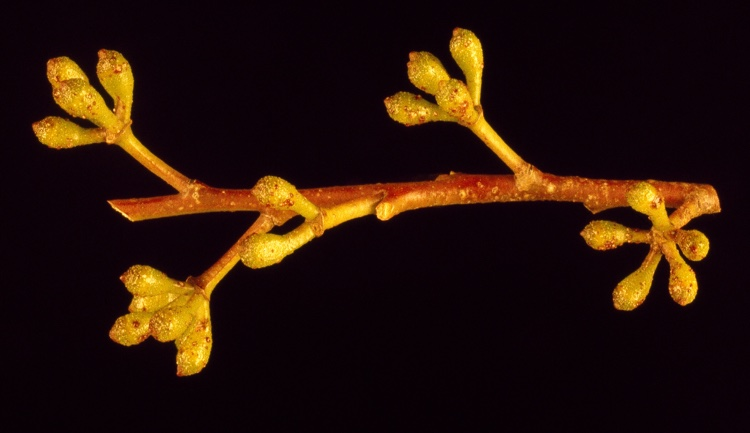
Flower buds

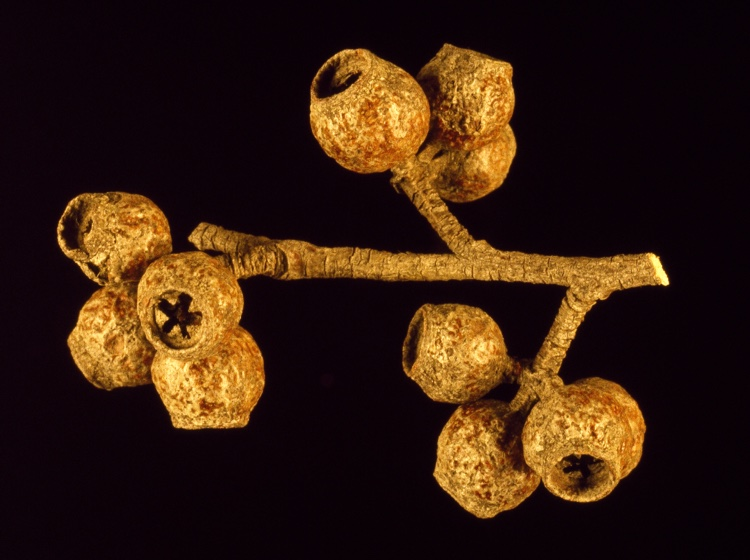
Fruit

== Description ==
Eucalyptus fraxinoides is a tree that typically grows to a height of 40 m (130 ft) and forms a lignotuber. It has rough, greyish, short fibrous bark on the lower trunk, smooth white, grey or yellow bark with insect scribbles above. Young plants and coppice regrowth have sessile, elliptic to egg-shaped to lance-shaped or curved leaves that are 60–150 mm (2.4–5.9 in) long and 15–45 mm (0.59–1.77 in) wide. Adult leaves are lance-shaped or curved, 80–180 mm (3.1–7.1 in) long and 10–35 mm (0.39–1.38 in) wide on a petiole 8–16 mm (0.31–0.63 in) wide. The flower buds are arranged in leaf axils in groups of seven, nine or eleven on an unbranched peduncle 5–18 mm (0.20–0.71 in) long, the individual buds on pedicels 1–6 mm (0.039–0.236 in) long. Mature buds are oval, 5–6 mm (0.20–0.24 in) long and 3–4 mm (0.12–0.16 in) wide with a conical to rounded operculum. Flowering occurs from December to February and the flowers are white. The fruit is a woody, barrel-shaped or urn-shaped capsule 7–11 mm (0.28–0.43 in) long and 6–11 mm (0.24–0.43 in) wide.

== Taxonomy and naming ==
Eucalyptus fraxinoides was first formally described in 1898 by Henry Deane and Joseph Maiden from specimens they collected with William Bäuerlen on Tantawangalo Mountain near Cathcart. The description was published in Proceedings of the Linnean Society of New South Wales. The specific epithet (fraxinoides) refers to a perceived similarity to trees in the genus Fraxinus. (The suffix -oides means "likeness" in Latin.) Fraxinus americana is also known as white ash.

== Distribution and habitat ==
White ash grows in cool, moist forest on mountain ranges near the coast and on the tablelands of southern New South Wales and far north-eastern Victoria where it often grows in pure stands. In New South Wales it is found south from Sassafras near Tianjara and in Victoria it is confined to the Howe Range near Mallacoota.
