= Bombala =

- Town
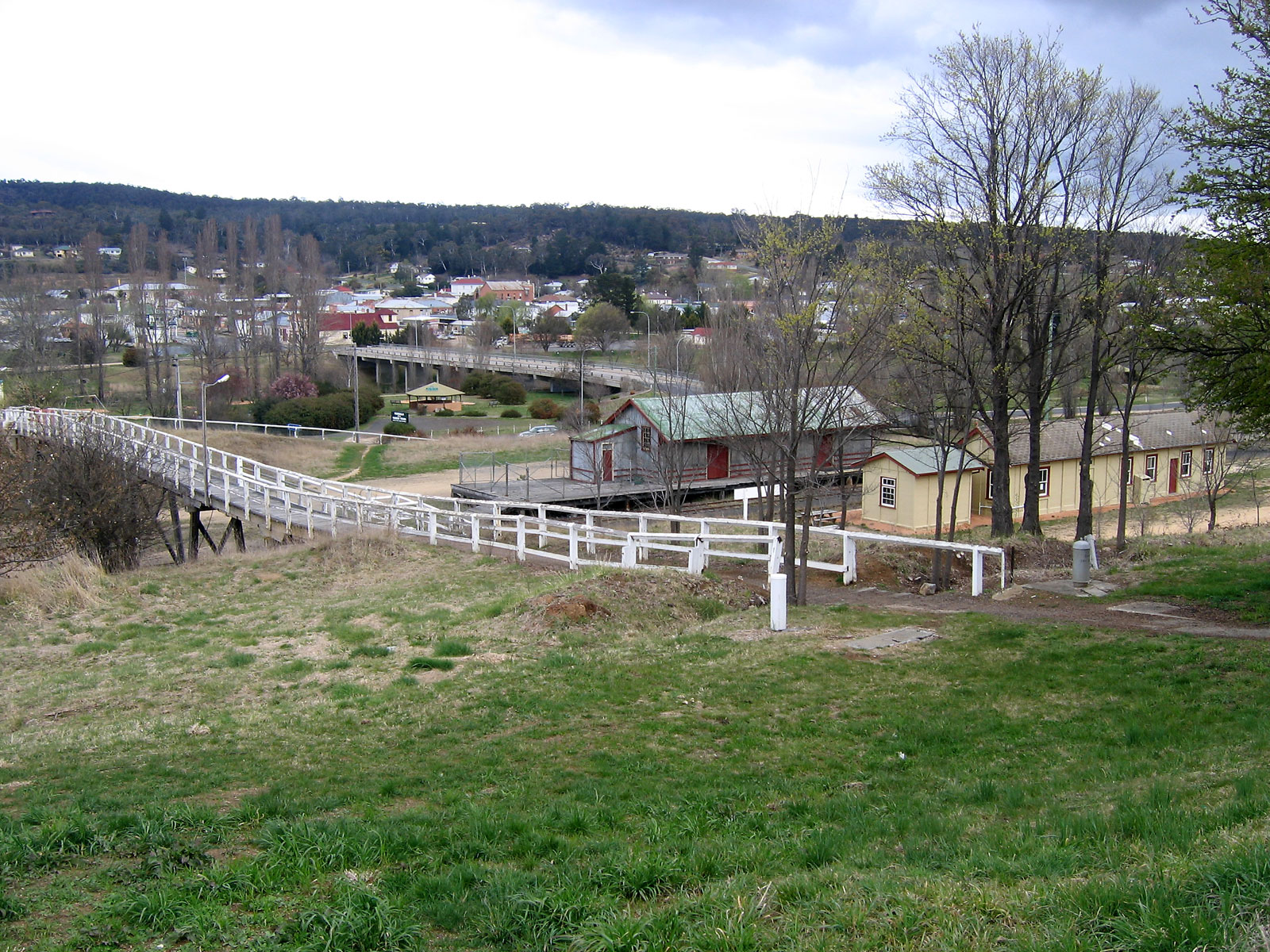
- Bombala, looking towards the town centre. The footbridge passes over the Bombala railway line. The right most building is the station building, the centre building the goods shed and above that is the bridge over the Bombala River.

- Coordinates: 36°55′0″S 149°14′0″E
- Country: Australia
- State: New South Wales
- LGA: Snowy Monaro Regional Council
- Location: 485 km (301 mi) SSW of Sydney; 202 km (126 mi) S of Canberra; 87 km (54 mi) S of Cooma; 77 km (48 mi) WSW of Bega
- Established: 1840s

Government
  - State electorate: Monaro
  - Federal division: Eden-Monaro
- Elevation: 705 m (2,313 ft)

Population
  - Total: 1,892 (2021 census)
- Postcode: 2632
- County: Wellesley
- Mean max temp: 18.5 °C (65.3 °F)
- Mean min temp: 4.9 °C (40.8 °F)
- Annual rainfall: 650.9 mm (25.63 in)

Bombala is a town in the Monaro region of far southern New South Wales, Australia, in Snowy Monaro Regional Council. It is approximately 485 kilometres (301 mi) south-southwest of the state capital, Sydney, and 80 kilometres (50 mi) south of the town of Cooma. The name derives from an Aboriginal word meaning "Meeting of the waters". The town lies on the banks of the Bombala River. At the 2021 census, Bombala had a population of 1,892.

== History ==
The Bombala area was inhabited by the Ngarigu Aboriginal people prior to the first European settlers arriving in the 1830s. Captain Ronald Campbell established a large property in 1833 that he named 'Bombalo'. More European settlers arrived in the Bombala area in the 1840s during which time the small township developed. Bombala had a post office by 1849 and had a number of large commercial and public buildings by the mid 1850s.

Bombala was proposed in 1903 by King O'Malley as the site of the parliamentary seat of Australia. It was considered as a location because it was halfway between the two cities of Sydney and Melbourne. The proposal was ultimately rejected in favour of Canberra. The site proposed for the capital city was a little to the west of the town of Bombala, on the right bank of the Bombala River. The town of Bombala would have been a part of a new federal territory.

The town lies on the banks of the Bombala River and principal industries of the area include grazing and timber. Tourism is also growing in importance to the local economy. There is also a small amount of specialty producers with meat rabbits, lavender and many herbs being grown in the district. Delegate is situated 36 km west of Bombala and The Snowy River March which commenced from Delegate in 1916 went via Bombala to Goulburn.

The timber industry has slowly begun to overtake many of the historic properties surrounding Bombala, such as the more-than-150-year-old property of Aston, 10 kilometres (6.2 mi) south-west of the township.

On 13 December 1962, Bombala post office received the last telegram to be transmitted using Morse code telegraphy in New South Wales.

The area is known for possibly the largest population of Platypus in New South Wales and is promoted as Platypus Country.

The Holy Transfiguration Monastery is a male monastic community of the Russian Orthodox Church Abroad. Founded in 1982, the monastic community presided over by Abbott Hieromonk Sergius, abides in the pristine and rugged valley of the MacLaughlin River situated between Cooma and Bombala.

The Facebook page "Bombala History in Photos" contains a wealth of information about the town's history.

On 15 January 2022, a tornado touched down in the vicinity of the town.

Bombala has seen recent economic growth with the development of renewable energy projects in the region, contributing to local employment and sustainability initiatives. The annual 'Bombala Show,' celebrating local agriculture, crafts, and community spirit, remains a key event in fostering regional pride and tourism. Recent census data highlights a diverse community, with increasing efforts towards cultural inclusivity and support for local Indigenous heritage projects.

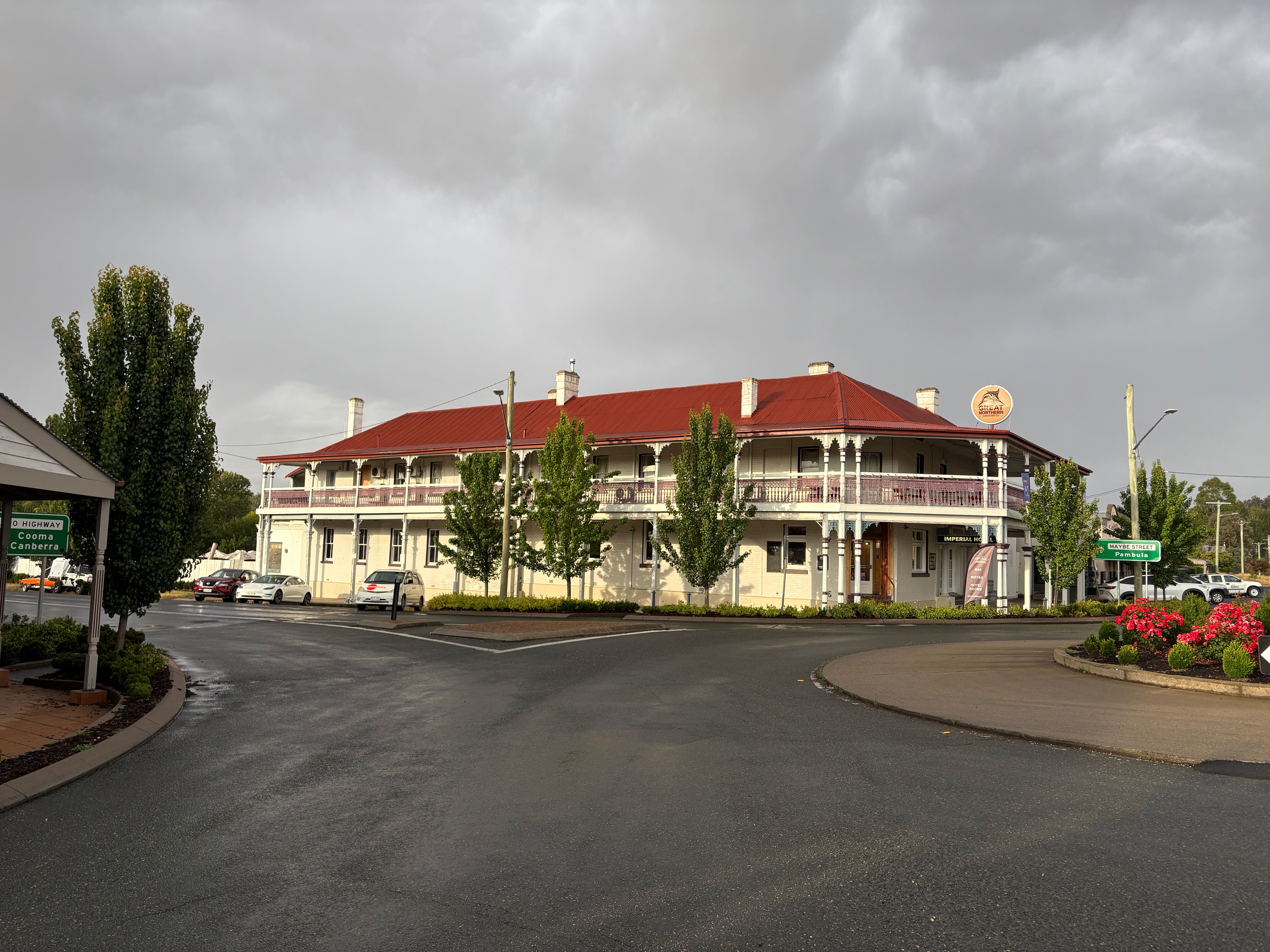
Imperial Hotel Bombala 1872

== Heritage listings ==
Bombala has a number of heritage-listed sites, including:

- Goulburn-Bombala railway: Bombala railway station
- 91 Main Road: Crankies Plain Bridge

== Geography and climate ==
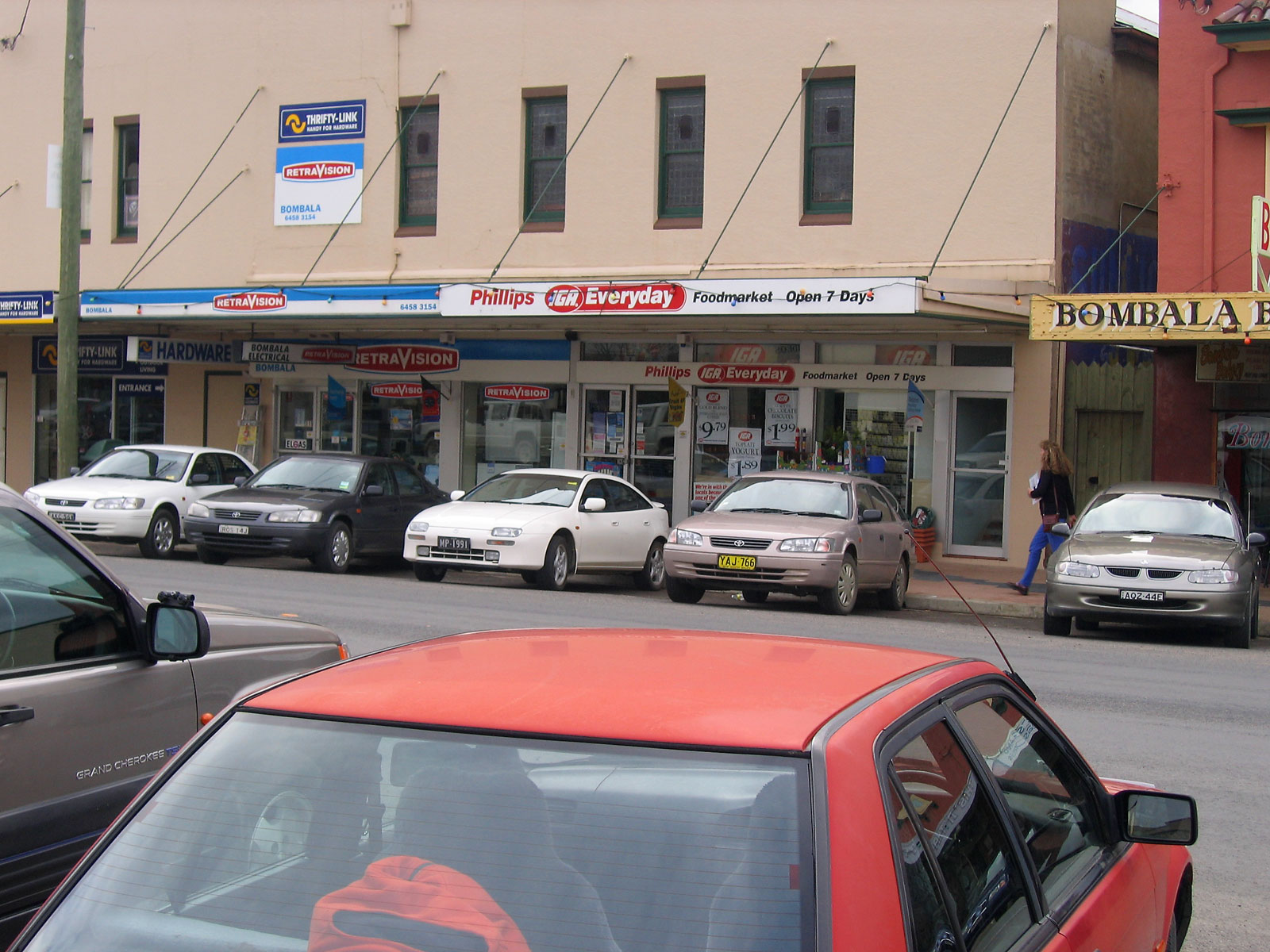
Typical Bombala street full of back-parked cars

Situated at 705 metres above sea level on the southeastern edge of the Monaro Tablelands, Bombala is known for its cold winters with frequent frost and regular dustings of snow. Snowfalls have even occurred in late spring and frosts can occur at the height of summer. A few kilometres to the east, the land slopes downwards to the South Coast, a flat coastal plain where summers are warmer and winter temperatures much milder. Examples are towns such as Bega and Merimbula, both about 80 kilometres east of Bombala. According to Köppen climate classification scheme, Bombala has an oceanic climate (Cfb).

Most rain in the area tends to fall as cold fronts, which at times allow for the development of severe thunderstorms in the spring and summer. Extreme temperatures have ranged from 41.5 °C (105.6 °F) to −10.0 °C (14.0 °F).

Climate data for Bombala (Therry Street, 1912–2022, rainfall to 1885); 705 m AMSL; 36.91° S, 149.24° E
Month	Jan	Feb	Mar	Apr	May	Jun	Jul	Aug	Sep	Oct	Nov	Dec	Year
Record high °C (°F)	41.5 (106.7)	40.7 (105.3)	36.4 (97.5)	31.1 (88.0)	26.7 (80.1)	22.1 (71.8)	21.3 (70.3)	24.5 (76.1)	30.1 (86.2)	32.0 (89.6)	37.5 (99.5)	38.5 (101.3)	41.5 (106.7)
Mean daily maximum °C (°F)	25.6 (78.1)	25.0 (77.0)	22.6 (72.7)	18.6 (65.5)	14.8 (58.6)	11.6 (52.9)	11.1 (52.0)	12.8 (55.0)	15.9 (60.6)	18.9 (66.0)	21.3 (70.3)	23.9 (75.0)	18.5 (65.3)
Mean daily minimum °C (°F)	10.5 (50.9)	10.6 (51.1)	8.6 (47.5)	5.3 (41.5)	2.0 (35.6)	−0.1 (31.8)	−1.1 (30.0)	−0.1 (31.8)	2.3 (36.1)	4.7 (40.5)	7.0 (44.6)	9.0 (48.2)	4.9 (40.8)
Record low °C (°F)	0.4 (32.7)	1.3 (34.3)	−0.2 (31.6)	−5.0 (23.0)	−7.1 (19.2)	−10.0 (14.0)	−9.6 (14.7)	−8.0 (17.6)	−6.4 (20.5)	−4.7 (23.5)	−2.0 (28.4)	−0.5 (31.1)	−10.0 (14.0)
Average precipitation mm (inches)	64.2 (2.53)	58.7 (2.31)	61.1 (2.41)	45.2 (1.78)	43.5 (1.71)	59.8 (2.35)	46.0 (1.81)	40.2 (1.58)	44.5 (1.75)	56.3 (2.22)	65.5 (2.58)	64.1 (2.52)	650.9 (25.63)
Average rainy days (≥ 0.2mm)	8.2	7.7	8.4	8.1	9.2	10.4	9.4	10.1	10.3	10.4	9.9	9.1	111.2
Average afternoon relative humidity (%)	51	55	54	58	63	64	59	56	54	53	52	54	56
Source: Bureau of Meteorology

== Sport ==
The most popular sport in Bombala is rugby league. The Bombala Blue Heelers play in the Group 16 Rugby League competition. Officially, the team merged with rivals the Delegate Tigers in the 1980s, with the club officially known as Bombala-Delegate.

== Transport ==
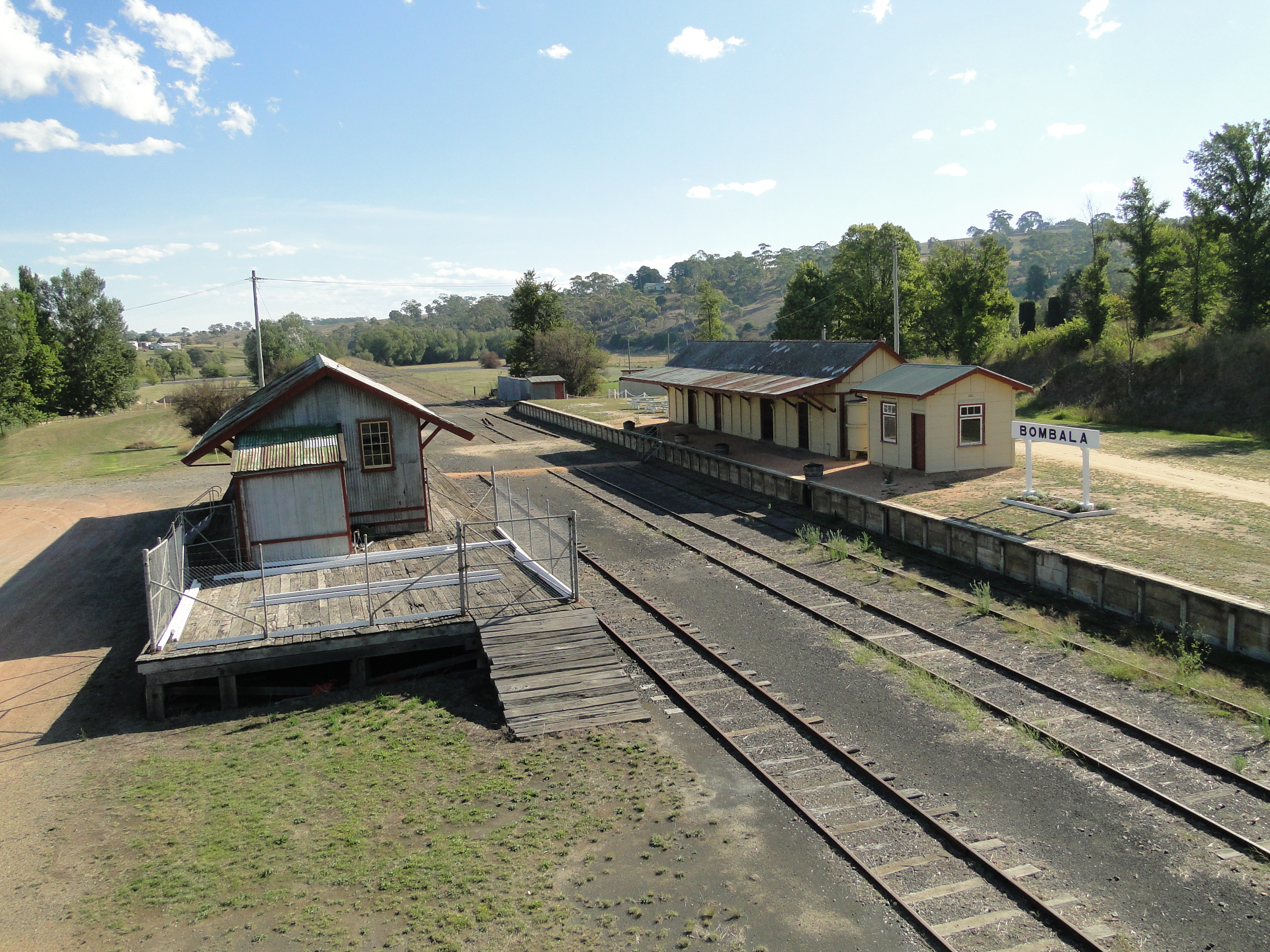
Bombala Railway Station

The railway reached Bombala in 1921 and closed on 29 March 1986. being an extension of the line from Queanbeyan to Cooma. The line was and still is known as the Goulburn to Bombala line. During the 1970s, service was provided by a small rail bus, taking 4 hours to cover the 100 kilometres (62 mi) between Cooma and Bombala (compare road distance 88 kilometres (55 mi)).

The Monaro Highway (now route B23) which runs from Canberra to Cann River (Victoria) passes through Bombala. Other major roads include Mt Darragh Rd which connects to Pambula and Merimbula on the NSW South Coast.

The nearest airport with regular air services is at Merimbula, 85 kilometres (53 mi) to the east.

== Population ==
Historical population
Year	Pop.	±%
1921	978	—
1933	931	−4.8%
1947	1,111	+19.3%
1954	1,258	+13.2%
1961	1,389	+10.4%
1966	1,495	+7.6%
1971	1,489	−0.4%
1976	1,474	−1.0%
1981	1,504	+2.0%
1986	1,458	−3.1%
1991	1,404	−3.7%
1996	1,380	−1.7%
2001	1,222	−11.4%
2006	1,206	−1.3%
2011	1,211	+0.4%
2016	1,197	−1.2%
2021	1,136	−5.1%
Source: Australian Bureau of Statistics data.

In the 2021 Census, there were 1,892 people in the broader Bombala region, and 1,136 in the Bombala urban centre. 83.2% of people were born in Australia and 89.2% of people spoke only English at home. The most common responses for religion were No Religion 29.2%, Anglican 26.8% and Catholic 21.7%.

== Colonial snapshot – 1872 ==
A reporter for the Australian Town and Country Journal visited Bombala in January 1872 He noted that the district (population 800) had already proved a source of immense wealth as a wool growing district. He reported that were three churches (Church of England, Roman Catholic, Presbyterian), a bank, two newspapers, a public school with 90 students, about six stores, the same number of hotels, a steam flour mill, two tanneries, and two saddlers & harness makers.

He noted the unusual Street names including Maybe-street and Caveat-street. He claimed The Commercial Bank [the building still stands on the northwest corner of Caveat and Maybe-street] 'is one of the finest edifices of the kind in the colony out of Sydney.'

He noted that 'A fine new building in brick (what would be the Imperial Hotel), is also in course of erection, by Mr Curran, but is not yet finished.' (The heritage study of 2018 found that the former shingle roof of the Hotel still exists beneath the corrugated iron.)

He reported that Bombala was a town divided. After the old bridge was washed away, the town is 'divided against itself, the north and south fighting for the supremacy. The only means of conveyance for foot passengers is afforded by a boat under the charge of the 'Admiral.'

== The railway arrives – 1921 ==
The railway service between Bombala and Cooma (61 km) opened on Monday 21 November 1921. The service ran daily (except Sundays) leaving Cooma at 07:45, arriving at Bombala at 12:00, returning at 13:25. Onward service to Sydney arrived in the centre at 05:50.

The following Friday (9 December) fine but cold was Railway Day. Around 3,000 adults and 600 children gathered at the Station. People had come from surrounding areas and from places along the line as far as Goulburn. As the train steamed in the band played "Advance Australia Fair."

The Government representatives on the first train from Sydney via Cooma were all standing in for the responsible Ministers who were caught up in the seven-hour Government or Fuller Government crisis. Having unloaded the passengers, the train backed up to allow a red ribbon to be cut by the stand-in for the Minister for Works Mr Coates. Coates was given a pair of silver scissors to cut the ribbon with the words 'With the cutting of this ribbon I trust that all barriers will be removed from the progress of the district.' Coates said the line extension had cost £519,353 (around $26m in 2026).

The crowd then processed through the Wool Arch at the bridge to the Show Ground for a meal, sports and a free merry-go-round. In the afternoon 700 children took up the offer of a free return train ride to Bukalong. The Wool Arch was built on two pillars of wool packs and butter boxes from the Cathcart factory all surmounted by an arch of white and black wool spelling out Advance Bombala. In the evening there was a banquet, a ball, and free pictures. The tables at the banquet were decorated with flowers from local gardens, and at each seat was a paper serviette on which was printed, "Railway Opening, Bombala, 9th December,1921. The Railway will make beautiful Bombala Bigger, Brighter, Busier."

== Notable residents ==
- Minard Crommelin MBE (1881–1972), postmistress and environmental conservationist, born at Aston Station, near Bombala.
- Michael Farrell (born 1965), contemporary poet and magazine editor, born in Bombala.
- Sir Alexander George William "Bill" Keys AC, OBE, MC (1923–2000), long-serving president of the Returned and Services League (RSL), grew up in Bombala.
- Dick Tooth (1929–2020), former Australian rugby union representative, born in Bombala.
- William Farmer Whyte (1877–1958), journalist and author
- Charles Henry Kerry (1857–1928), photographer
- Wilfred Alexander de Beuzeville (1884–1954), forester
- Ky Rodwell, rugby league footballer
