= List of museums in the Australian Capital Territory =

This list of museums in the Australian Capital Territory, Australia contains museums that are defined for this context as institutions (including nonprofit organizations, government entities, and private businesses) that collect and care for objects of cultural, artistic, scientific, or historical interest and make their collections or related exhibits available for public viewing. Also included are non-profit art galleries and university art galleries.

Name	Location	Type	Summary
ANCA Gallery	Dickson	Art	website, gallery of the Australian National Capital Artists
ANU School of Art Gallery	Canberra	Art	website
Australian National University Classics Museum	Canberra	Archaeology	website, ancient art and artefacts from Ancient Greece, Rome, Egypt and the Near East
Australian War Memorial	Canberra	Military	Museum and national memorial
Belconnen Arts Centre	Belconnen	Art	website
Blundell's Cottage	Canberra	Historic house	19th century farm cottage
Calthorpes' House	Red Hill	Historic house	1920s period house
Canberra Craft & Design Centre	Canberra	Art	website, contemporary craft and design
Canberra Fire Museum	Canberra	Firefighting	website
Canberra Glassworks	Canberra	Art	Glass studio and gallery
Canberra Museum and Gallery	Canberra	Multiple	City's social history, visual arts
Canberra Railway Museum	Kingston	Railway	Historic locomotives, passenger cars, freight vehicles, track machinery and railway memorabilia
Canberra Space Centre	Tidbinbilla	Aerospace	website, space, astronomy and the work of the Canberra Deep Space Communication Complex
CSIRO Discovery Centre	Acton	Science	website, Australian scientific research and technology from CSIRO
Drill Hall Gallery	Acton	Art	Part of Australian National University
Gallery of Australia Design	Canberra	Art	website, Australian design and architecture
Lanyon Homestead	Canberra	Historic house	1850s period homestead
Mugga-Mugga	Symonston	Historic house	website, early 20th century period cottage
Museum of Australian Democracy at Old Parliament House	Parkes	History	Democracy and Australia's political history
National Archives of Australia	Canberra	History	Significant documents and other items
National Capital Exhibition	Canberra	Local history	website, city history and culture
National Dinosaur Museum	Gold Creek Village	Natural history	Evolution of all life with a particular focus on dinosaurs
National Film and Sound Archive	Acton	Cinema	
National Gallery of Australia	Canberra	Art	Includes Australian, Western, Eastern, Modern and Pacific arts, photography, crafts
National Museum of Australia	Acton	History	Australia's social history
National Portrait Gallery	Canberra	Art	Portraits of prominent Australians
Royal Australian Mint	Canberra	Numismatic	Mint tours, rare and historically significant coins from the National Coin Collection
Questacon	Canberra	Science	
St John's Schoolhouse Museum	Reid	Education	website, Canberra's first schoolhouse, located at St John the Baptist Church, Reid
Tuggeranong Arts Centre	Tuggeranong	Art	Performing and visual arts centre

== See also ==
- List of museums in Australia
