= Gilmore, Australian Capital Territory =

Gilmore
- Suburb
- Coordinates: 35°25′16″S 149°07′59″E
- Country: Australia
- State: Australian Capital Territory
- City: Canberra
- District: Tuggeranong
- Location: 21 km (13 mi) S of Canberra CBD; 15 km (9.3 mi) SW of Queanbeyan; 103 km (64 mi) SW of Goulburn; 300 km (190 mi) SW of Sydney
- Established: 1985

Government
  - Territory electorate: Brindabella
  - Federal division: Bean

Area
  - Total: 2.0 km^{2} (0.77 sq mi)
- Elevation: 661 m (2,169 ft)

Population
  - Total: 2,706 (2021 census)
  - Density: 1,350/km^{2} (3,500/sq mi)
- Postcode: 2905
- Gazetted: 5 August 1975
Suburbs around Gilmore
Fadden	Macarthur
	Gilmore	Chisholm
Chisholm	Chisholm

Gilmore is a suburb in the Canberra, Australia, district of Tuggeranong. The postcode is 2905. The suburb is named after the poet and journalist, Dame Mary Gilmore. It was gazetted on 5 August 1975. Streets are named after journalists, particularly female journalists.

It is next to the suburbs of Macarthur and Chisholm and is bounded by the Monaro Highway, Isabella Drive, and Hambidge Crescent.

== Demographics ==
At the 2021 census, Gilmore had a population of 2,706 people. The median age of people in Gilmore was 37 years, compared to a median age of 35 for Canberra. The median weekly individual income for Gilmore in 2021, was $1,164, compared to the ACT average of $1,203, while the median weekly household income was $2,416. In 2021 the median monthly housing loan repayment in Gilmore was $2,048.

The residents of Gilmore are predominantly Australian-born, with 79.5% being born in Australia. The five leading countries of birth for those born overseas were England, 2.9%; New Zealand, 1.3%, India, 1.3%; Philippines, 1.2%; and China, 0.7%. The most popular religious affiliations in descending order are no religion, Catholic, and Anglican.

== Suburb amenities ==
Gilmore Neighbourhood Oval is located on Heagney Crescent. The Rose Cottage heritage site, located off Isabella Drive, is heritage-listed and is open to the public. The site includes a nursery and craft centre. An ActewAGL Electricity substation is located in Gilmore, with access off Isabella Drive.

Several ACTION bus routes service Gilmore. Routes 74 and 75 connect Gilmore to Tuggeranong Town Centre and Erindale Centre. It also services Chisholm and Richardson.

== Governance ==
2025 federal election
Labor	40.88%
Liberal	26.60%
Independent	25.08%
Greens	7.43%

Gilmore is located within the federal Bean electorate, represented by David Smith for Labor in the House of Representatives. In the ACT Legislative Assembly, Gilmore is part of the electorate of Brindabella, which elects five members based on proportional representation, currently two Liberal, two Labor, and one Green. Polling place statistics are shown to the right for the Gilmore polling place at Gilmore Primary School in the 2025 federal election.

== Geology ==
Gilmore is built on volcanic rocks from the Silurian age. The rock member is titled Deakin Volcanics. Rhyolite covers most of Gilmore except in the east, where rhyodacite is found. These are from the Silurian age at 414 Mya.
