= Canberra Museum and Gallery =

Art gallery and museum in Canberra, Australia

Coordinates: 35.280682°S 149.130628°E

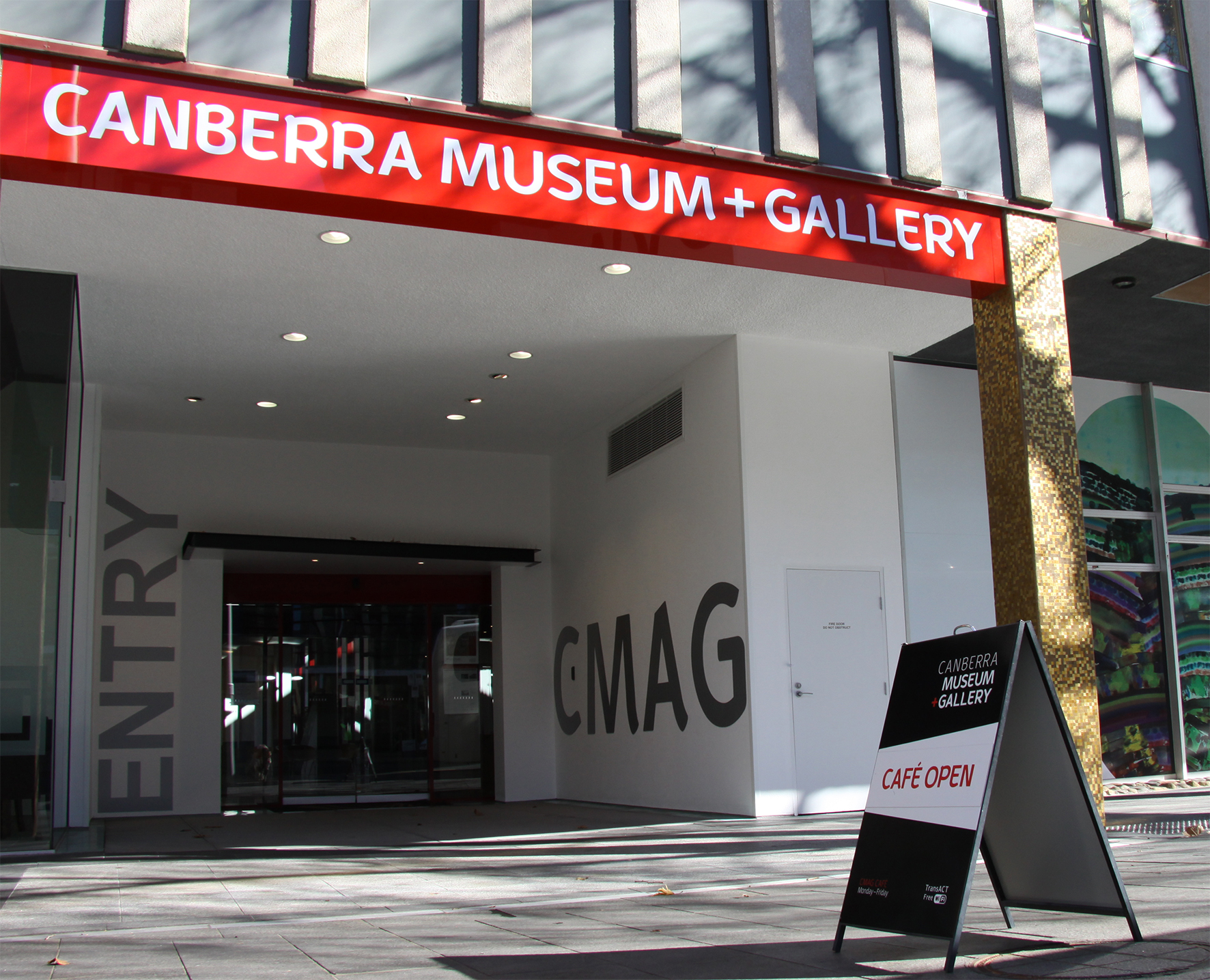
- Entrance of museum
- Established: 1998
- Location: City Centre, Australian Capital Territory, Australia
- Director: Sarah Schmidt
- Website: www.cmag.com.au

Canberra Museum and Gallery is an art gallery and museum in Canberra, the capital of Australia. It is located in Civic Square, on London Circuit, in Civic in the centre of the city. The gallery was opened on 13 February 1998.

The museum houses a permanent collection called Reflecting Canberra which opened on 14 February 2001. Among other things the exhibition includes works on display about the Canberra bushfires of 2003.

There are several galleries located on two floors of the building, which have different exhibitions of paintings, photography or other works of art and the social history of Canberra. In its first five years the gallery had held 158 exhibitions. Entry to the gallery is free.

CMAG is part of ACT Museums and Galleries which is an administrative unit of the Cultural Facilities Corporation (CFC), part of the ACT Government. The CFC was established under the Cultural Facilities Corporation Act 1997 for the purpose of managing and developing a number of the ACT's major cultural assets: the Canberra Theatre; the Canberra Museum and Gallery; the Nolan Collection and ACT Historic Places (Lanyon Homestead, Calthorpes' House and Mugga Mugga). The corporation's responsibilities span across the performing and visual arts, social history and cultural heritage management.

Consisting of the Canberra Museum and Gallery, the Nolan Collection and ACT Historic Places (Lanyon, Calthorpes’ House and Mugga Mugga), ACT Museums and Galleries delivers a range of cultural services to the community in providing activities such as exhibitions, public and education programs, as well as through collecting, conserving and presenting significant aspects of the ACT's cultural heritage.

CMAG offers a variety of interactive, educational experiences for students from K-12. The interactive activities range from story telling, creating art, and engaging with exhibitions. Online resources are available on the CMAG website for educators.

== See also ==
- List of museums in the Australian Capital Territory
- Mugga-Mugga at Google Cultural Institute
