= Gowrie, Australian Capital Territory =

Gowrie
- Suburb
- Coordinates: 35°24′43″S 149°06′36″E
- Country: Australia
- State: Australian Capital Territory
- City: Canberra
- District: Tuggeranong
- Location: 20 km (12 mi) S of Canberra CBD; 14 km (8.7 mi) SW of Queanbeyan; 104 km (65 mi) SW of Goulburn; 301 km (187 mi) SW of Sydney
- Established: 1981

Government
  - Territory electorate: Brindabella
  - Federal division: Bean

Area
  - Total: 1.9 km^{2} (0.73 sq mi)
- Elevation: 610 m (2,000 ft)

Population
  - Total: 3,140 (2021 census)
  - Density: 1,650/km^{2} (4,280/sq mi)
- Postcode: 2904
- Gazetted: 5 August 1975
Suburbs around Gowrie
Wanniassa		Fadden
Monash	Gowrie
Isabella Plains	Richardson	Chisholm

Gowrie is a suburb of Canberra, Australia, located in the northern end of the Tuggeranong Valley. Tuggeranong suburbs are the southernmost of Australia's capital city. Gowrie is named after Brigadier-General Alexander Gore Arkwright Hore-Ruthven, 1st Earl of Gowrie (1872–1955), Governor-General of Australia from 1936 to 1944.

Many (but not all) of Gowrie's streets are named after members of the Australian Defence Force who won decorations, including the Victoria Cross. Gowrie is the former site of the Athllon Homestead.

== Demographics ==
At the 2021 census, Gowrie had a population of 3,140 people. The median age of people in Gowrie was 38 years, compared to a median age of 35 for Canberra. The median individual income for Gowrie in 2021 was $1,207, almost equal with the ACT median of $1,203, while the median household income was $2,228. In 2021, the median monthly housing loan repayment in Gowrie was $2,674.

The residents of Gowrie are predominantly Australian born, with 77.4% being born in Australia. The main countries of birth for those born overseas were England (3.3%), India (2.0%), New Zealand (1.2%), Philippines (1.2%) and Italy (0.7%). The most popular religious affiliations in descending order are no religion, Catholic, Anglican and Islam.

== Suburb amenities ==
The Gowrie local shopping centre is located on Jeffries Street. The centre includes a supermarket, pharmacy, hairdresser and the Common Grounds cafe. Jeffries Street is also the site of a child care centre and the Gowrie Preschool. The Erindale Scout Hall is in Finlay Place. The Gowrie District Playing fields also are located in the suburb.

== Education ==
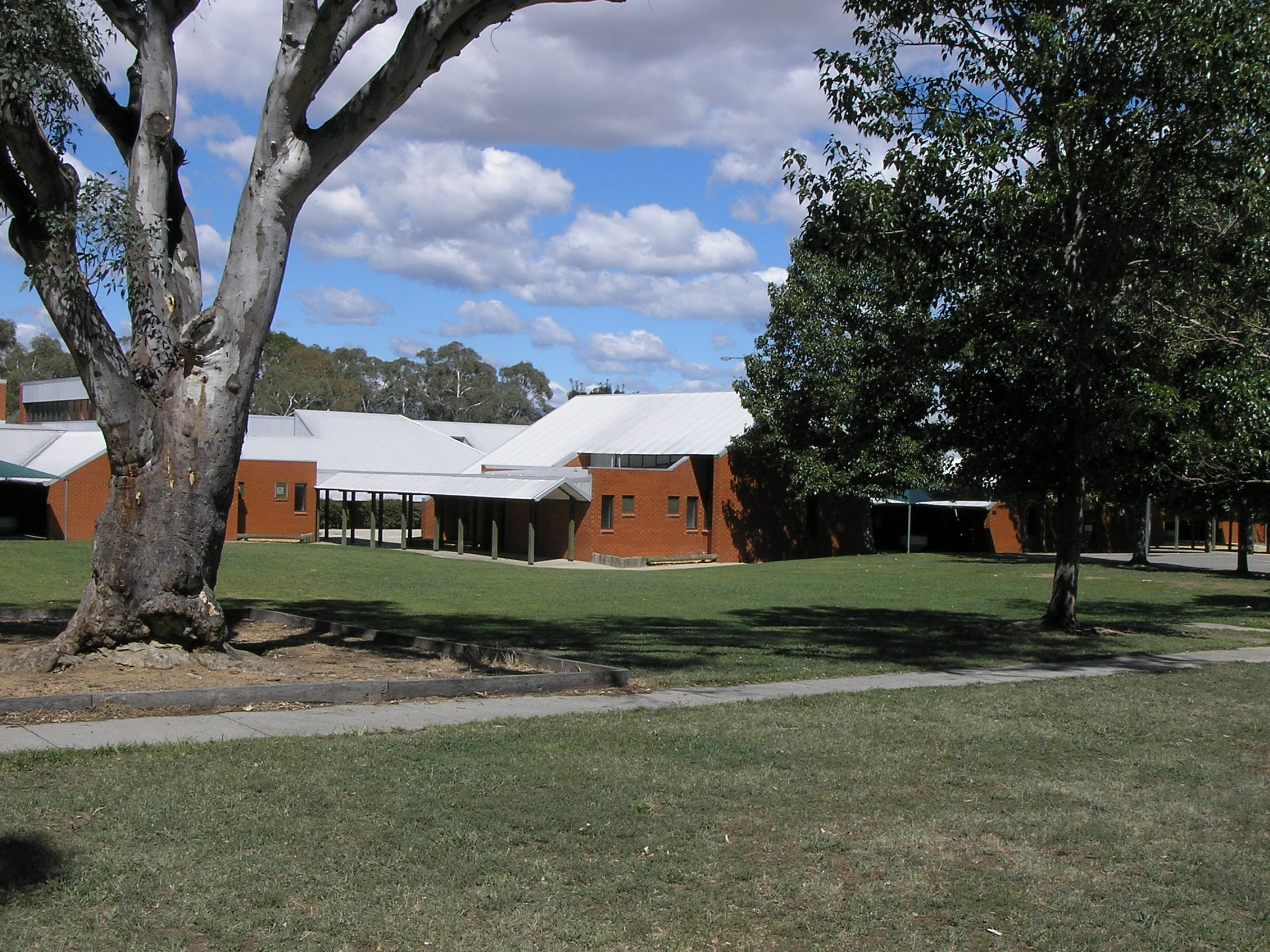
Gowrie Primary School, showing the Lambrigg, Cuppacumbalong and Lanyon buildings

Gowrie Primary School, located on Jeffries Street, opened in 1983. The school's design has a rural theme, and each of the buildings are named after properties in the Tuggeranong Valley. The Catholic Holy Family Parish Primary School and the Holy Family Church, both part of the South Tuggeranong Corpus Christi Parish, are located on Bugden Avenue.

== Churches ==
Tuggeranong Presbyterian Church meets at Gowrie Primary School in Jeffries Street.

== Transport ==
Gowrie is serviced by several ACTION bus routes. Routes 76 and 77 connect Gowrie to Tuggeranong Town Centre and Erindale Centre. Route R5 travels along Ashley Drive with several bus stops along it.

== Governance ==
2025 federal election
Labor	38.82%
Independent	30.22%
Liberal	22.10%
Greens	8.87%
2024 ACT election
Labor	37.6%
Liberal	36.1%
Greens	9.7%
Independent	9.0%

Gowrie is located within the federal electorate of Bean, which is represented by David Smith in the House of Representatives. In the ACT Legislative Assembly, Gowrie is part of the electorate of Brindabella, which elects five members on the basis of proportional representation, currently two Liberal, two Labor and one Greens. Polling place statistics are shown to the right for the Gowrie polling place at Gowrie Primary School in the 2025 federal and 2024 ACT elections.

== Geology ==
The west of Gowrie is built on Deakin Volcanics green-grey and purple rhyodacite. In the east, Gowrie is built on green-grey, purple and cream rhyolite. These rocks are 414 million years old from the Silurian period.

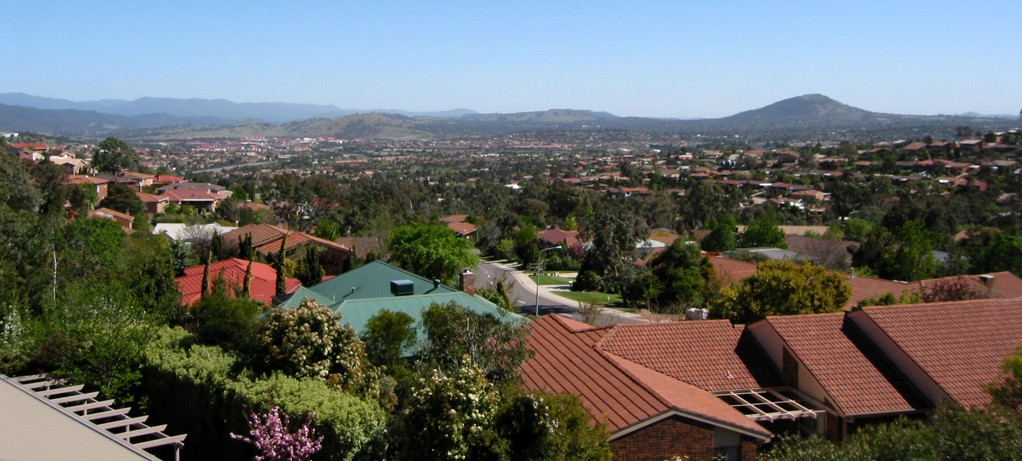
Looking north-west towards the Brindabella Ranges on the left and Gowrie on the right

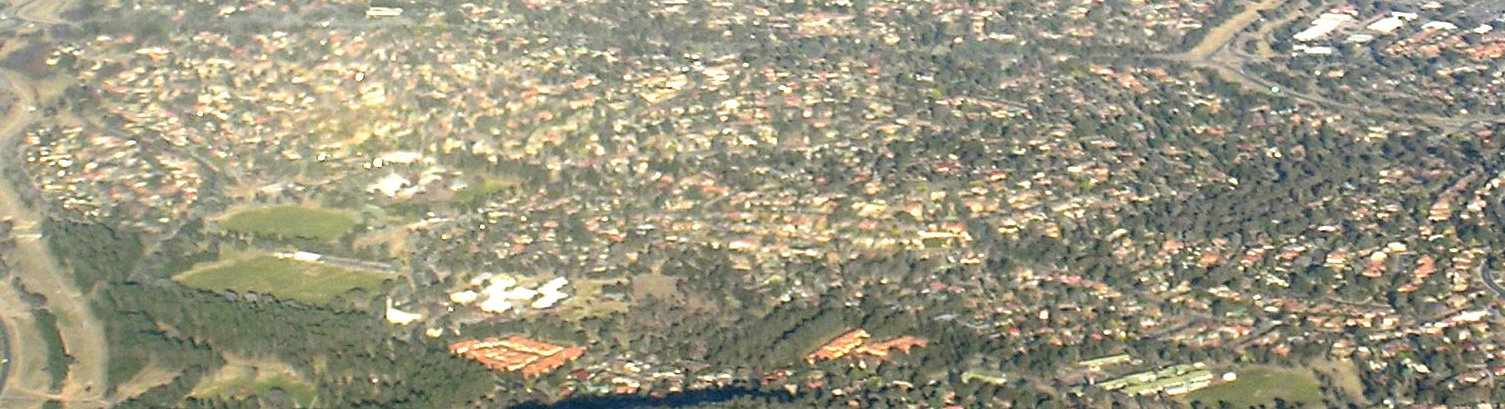
Aerial photo from the east
