= Chisholm, Australian Capital Territory =

Chisholm
- Suburb
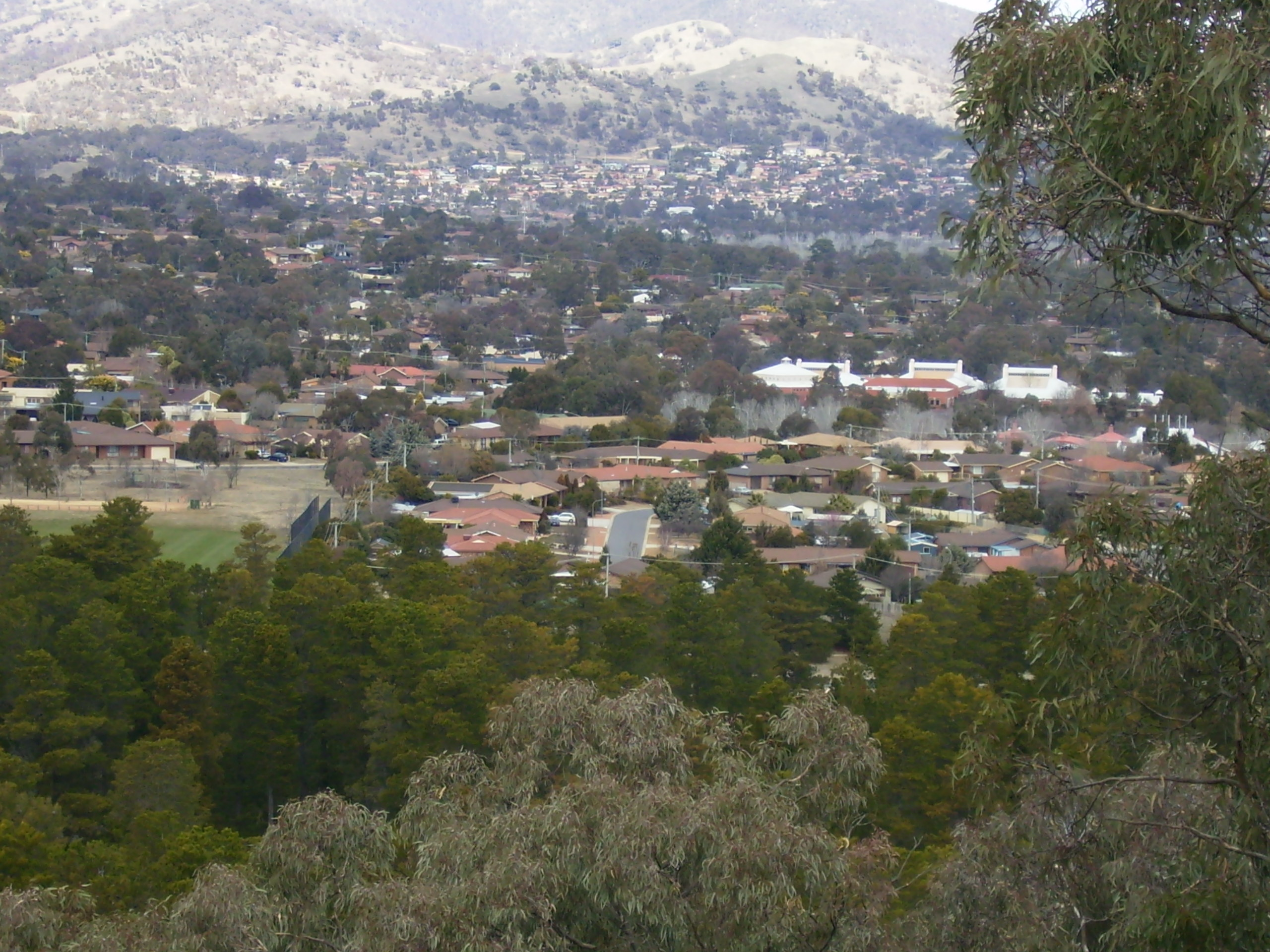
- View of Chisholm from Macarthur Hill

- Coordinates: 35°25′27″S 149°7′21″E
- Country: Australia
- State: Australian Capital Territory
- City: Canberra
- District: Tuggeranong
- Location: 21 km (13 mi) S of Canberra CBD; 13 km (8.1 mi) SW of Queanbeyan; 103 km (64 mi) SW of Goulburn; 300 km (190 mi) SW of Sydney
- Established: 1982

Government
  - Territory electorate: Brindabella
  - Federal division: Bean

Area
  - Total: 3.1 km^{2} (1.2 sq mi)
- Elevation: 640 m (2,100 ft)

Population
  - Total: 5,268 (2021 census)
  - Density: 1,699/km^{2} (4,400/sq mi)
- Postcode: 2905
- Gazetted: 5 August 1975
Suburbs around Chisholm
| Gowrie | Fadden | Macarthur |
| Richardson | Chisholm | Gilmore |
| Calwell | Calwell | Canberra Nature Park |

Chisholm (/ˈtʃɪzəm/ CHIZ-əm) is a suburb in the Canberra, Australia district of Tuggeranong, named after Caroline Chisholm.

It was gazetted on 5 August 1975, and streets are named after notable women.

It is nearby suburbs of Gilmore, Fadden, and Richardson. It is bounded by Isabella Drive, and the Monaro Highway. Chisholm and Gilmore are separated by Simpsons Hill, which provides some wilderness with walking tracks over it, popular for walking dogs.

== Demographics ==
At the 2021 census, Chisholm had a population of 5,268 people. The median age of people in Chisholm was 37 years, compared to a median age of 35 for Canberra. The median weekly personal income for people aged 15 years and over in Chisholm in 2021 was $1,088, compared to the ACT median of $1,203, while the median weekly household income was $2,292. In 2021, the median monthly housing loan repayment in Chisholm was $2,000.

Aboriginal and Torres Strait Islander people made up 3.2% of the population. 78.5% of all residents were born in Australia. The four main countries of birth for those born overseas were England (2.7%), India (2.1%), Philippines (1.1%) and New Zealand, (1.1%). 82.8% of people spoke only English at home. The most popular religious affiliations in descending order are no religion (40.8%), Catholic (25.0%) and Anglican (11.2%).

== Suburb amenities ==
=== Chisholm Group Centre ===
The Chisholm Group Centre is located on Halley Street and Benham Street and has a variety of shops and service outlets. These include a Coles supermarket, tavern, restaurants, general practitioner, dentist, BP service station, Fire Station, Rugby union club, child care and several other businesses. Chisholm also has several sporting facilities: the Chisholm District Playing Fields located on Proctor Street, the Chisholm Neighbourhood Oval on Alston Street and The Pines Tennis Club on Norris Street.

== Education ==
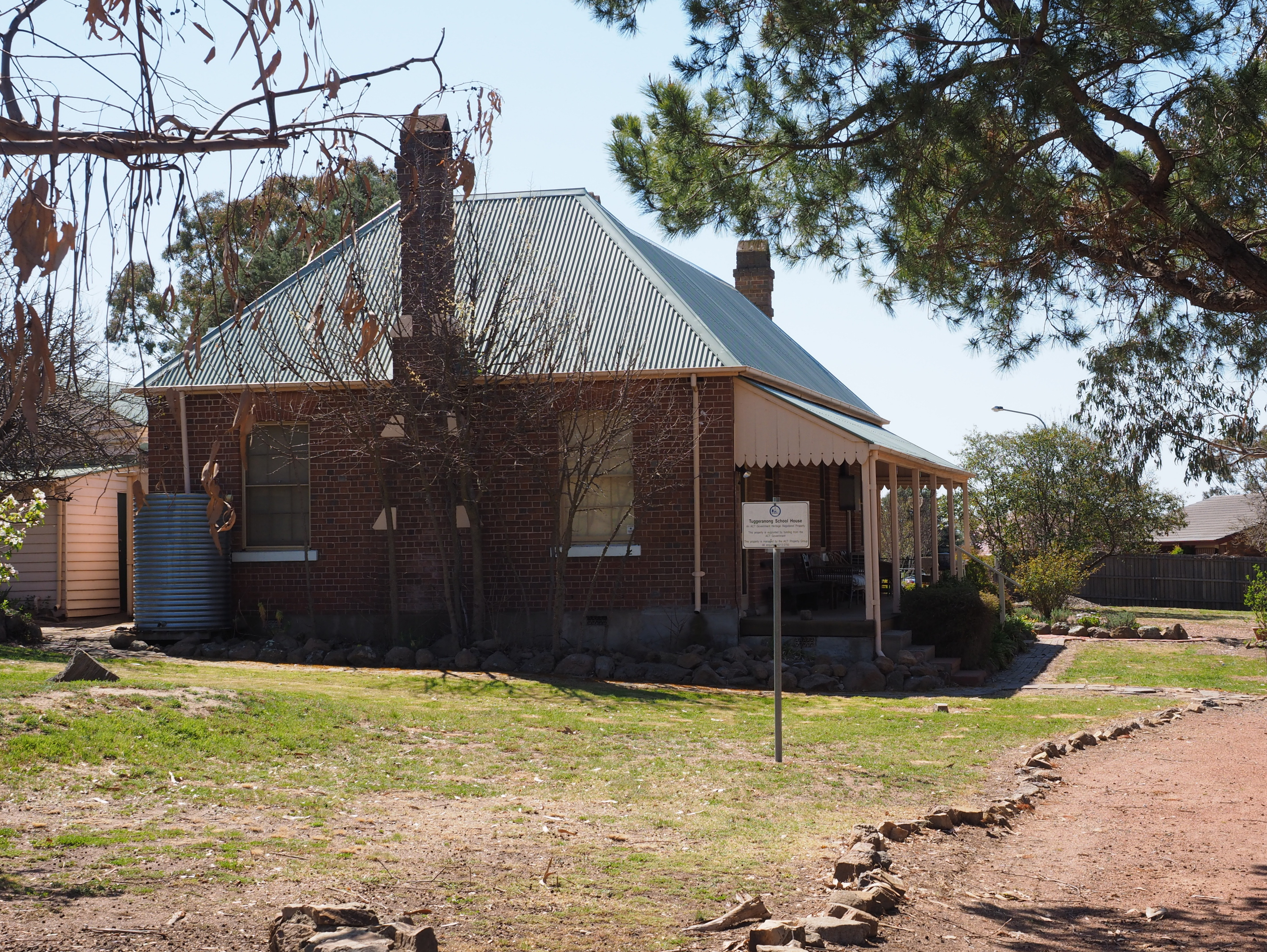
The historic former Tuggeranong Schoolhouse in Chisolm

Caroline Chisholm School caters for students from Pre school to Year 10. Chisholm High School, now the Senior Campus opened in 1985; the school won the RAIA Canberra Medallion for Outstanding Architecture the following year. The senior campus caters for students in Years 7 to 10. Chisholm Primary School, now the Junior Campus caters for students in Preschool to Year 6. Both schools are located on Hambidge Crescent.

The former Tuggeranong Schoolhouse is also located in Chisholm. This was a one teacher school which operated between 1870 and 1939. The surviving school building dates from 1880, and is now used as a museum.

== Transport ==
Chisholm is serviced by several ACTION bus routes. Routes 74 and 75 combine as a circular bus route which connects Chisholm and surrounding suburbs with the Tuggeranong Town Centre and Erindale Centre. Route 182 runs during peak hour from the Lanyon Marketplace to City West via Barton and follows the Monaro Highway. Routes 76 and 78 services surrounding suburbs including Gilmore and Richardson to Tuggeranong Interchange

== Governance ==
2025 federal election
| Labor | 41.03% |
| Liberal | 24.62% |
| Independent | 24.62% |
| Greens | 9.74% |
2024 ACT election
| Liberal | 42.2% |
| Labor | 34.5% |
| Greens | 8.8% |

Chisholm is located within the federal electorate of Bean, which is represented by David Smith in the House of Representatives. In the ACT Legislative Assembly, Chisholm is part of the electorate of Brindabella, which elects five members on the basis of proportional representation, currently two Liberal, two Labor and one Greens. Polling place statistics are shown to the right for the Chisholm polling place at Caroline Chisholm School in the 2025 federal and 2024 ACT elections.

== Geology ==
The rocks underneath Chisholm are two kinds of volcanic rock that erupted from volcanos in the Silurian period. The name of the member is called Deakin Volcanics. Rhyolite occurs throughout the suburb. Rhyodacite is found around the hill in the east of Chisholm. These rocks can be quite colourful as a result of alteration by water, and can be cream, grey, green, red or purple. The age of the rocks is 414 Mya.
