= Macarthur, Australian Capital Territory =

Macarthur
- Suburb
- Coordinates: 35°24′21″S 149°07′48″E
- Country: Australia
- State: Australian Capital Territory
- City: Canberra
- District: Tuggeranong
- Established: 1983

Government
  - Territory electorate: Brindabella
  - Federal division: Bean

Area
  - Total: 1.3 km^{2} (0.50 sq mi)

Population
  - Total: 1,405 (2021 census)
  - Density: 1,080/km^{2} (2,800/sq mi)
- Postcode: 2904
- Gazetted: 22 March 1982
Suburbs around Macarthur
Fadden	Canberra Nature Park	Canberra Nature Park
Fadden	Macarthur	Canberra Nature Park
Chisholm	Gilmore	Gilmore

Macarthur is a suburb in the Canberra district of Tuggeranong. The suburb is named after John Macarthur, one of the founders of Australia's Merino wool industry. It was gazetted on 22 March 1982 and first settled in 1983. The wool industry is the theme for street names. The suburb has an area of 1.27 km^{2}. It is next to the suburbs of Fadden and Gilmore, and is located north of Isabella Drive.

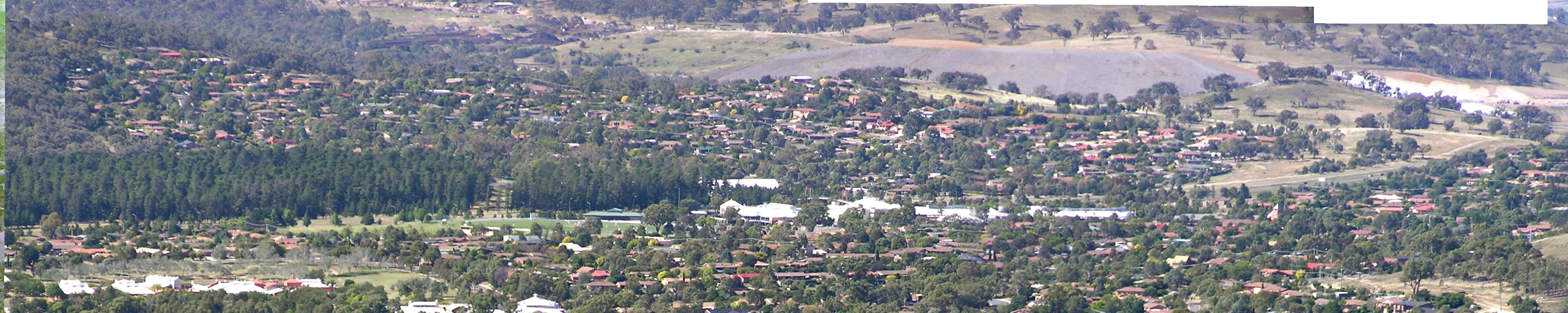
Macarthur seen from Tuggeranong Hill; note the Canberra tip in the top right

== Demographics ==
There were 1,405 people living in Macarthur on 2021 census. The median age of people in Macarthur was 39 years, compared to a median age of 35 for the ACT. The median weekly individual income for Macarthur in 2021 was $1,334, compared to the ACT average of $1,203, while the median weekly household income was $3,037. In 2021, the median monthly housing loan repayment in Macarthur was $2,200.

The residents of Macarthur are predominantly Australian born, with 82.6% being born in Australia. The three main countries of birth for those born overseas were England, 4.5%, India, 1.7% and South Africa, 0.9. The most popular religious affiliations in descending order are no religion, Catholic, Anglican and Orthodox.

== Suburb amenities ==
Macarthur Preschool is located on Carson Street. It was originally built in the 1980s and the original centre closed during the mid 2000s. The old centre was demolished in 2011. The new and current Macarthur Child Care Centre was built and officially reopened in June 2014 due to high local demand. . Wanniassa Hills, part of the Canberra Nature Park, is located in Macarthur. Macarthur also includes a horse holding paddock. The Macarthur Scout Group, which services Macarthur and nearby suburbs, has its hall on the Fadden side of Coyne Street.

Several ACTION bus routes service Macarthur. Route 74, 75 and 76 runs through Macarthur along Coyne Street and connects to Tuggeranong Town Centre and Erindale Centre.

== Sport ==
For a few years Macarthur was part of the ACT's motorsport activities. In 1978 a group of Canberra motorcycle racers approached the Department of the Interior for permission to use an unbuilt, yet developed, area in one of the unused suburbs in Tuggeranong for racing. The department gave them permission provided they found a suitable suburb that was well away from built-up areas in the closest suburb, Kambah, and that they complied with noise restrictions of that time. Macarthur, which was being developed but not actively being built upon, was chosen and was thus called Macarthur Park.

Macarthur Park used Coyne Street, Jackie Howe Crescent, Merriman Crescent and Carson Street to form the circuit and the undulating nature of the course made it one of the most attractive road courses in south-east Australia. The Canberra Road Racing Club (formed while racing at Fairburn Park) organised its first race meeting in 1978. Between 1978 and 1982 many race meetings and championship races were run with some modifications to the circuit made to accept sidecars in the last two years of competition.

Now that the suburb has been developed the circuit no longer exists. The only signs are the miscoloured traffic island extension on Coyne Street, which was put back in after the island was shortened to allow sidecars to be raced on the circuit, and a sign in the nearby pines about 50 metres from a small off-street carpark that explains the short history of the circuit and the riders that rode it. Visitors to the area may notice the name of Wayne Gardener on the sign.

== Governance ==
Macarthur is located within the federal electorate of Bean which is represented by David Smith in the House of Representatives.

In the ACT Legislative Assembly, Macarthur is in the Brindabella electorate, which is currently represented by two Liberal, two Labor and one Greens member.

== Geology ==
Macarthur is built on Deakin Volcanics green-grey, purple and cream rhyolite. This is from the Silurian age at 414 Mya.
