= Scouting and Guiding in the Australian Capital Territory =

Scouting and Guiding in the Australian Capital Territory (ACT) of Australia is predominantly represented by the branch of Scouts Australia, and Girl Guides NSW and ACT, a member of Girl Guides Australia.

== Scouts Australia ==
Australian Capital Territory
- Owner: Scouts Australia
- Country: Australia

In 2015, the structure of the Regions changed from 5 Regions to 2, the Northern and Southern Region, each managed by a Region Commissioner and their team.

Prior to 2015, the Branch was divided into five Scout regions, each headed by a Regional Commissioner:-

- Brindabella, covering the district of Tuggeranong
- Ginninderra, covering the district of Belconnen
- Gungahlin, covering the district of Gungahlin
- Hindmarsh covering the district of South Canberra, Weston Creek and Woden Valley
- Limestone Plains, covering the district of North Canberra

There are 28 Scout Groups including three Sea Scout Groups, an Air Scout Group, a Police Scout Group and a Mountain Scout Group.

The Air Scout Group traces its roots back to 1925, as the 2nd Canberra (formed 1925) and the 1st Yarralumla Groups merged in 1961 to create the LaTrobe Park Group, which later became the Air Scouts Group. The Police Scout Group was formed more recently in 1999 as an experiment to attract young people new to Scouting. As well as the normal program, it has an interest in crime prevention and police awareness.

== Girl Guides Australia ==
Girl Guides Australia are represented in the ACT by Girl Guides NSW & ACT.

== History ==
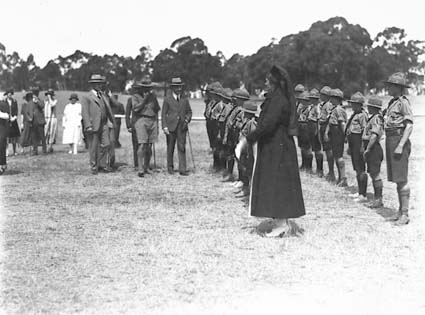
Boy Scouts being reviewed in Canberra in 1927

The Branch started in 1981, when it separated from New South Wakes, but Scouting started much earlier with the formation of the 1st Canberra Scout Group in Canberra which was registered on 27 January 1917. This Group appears to have closed for a while and then was reregistered in 1925, when the 2nd and 3rd Canberra Scout Groups were also formed. Prior to official registration, 1st Ainslie met as an unregistered Group in 1915/16.

In 1927, Canberra Scouts together with members from other States provided support for the opening of Parliament House. The Scouts camped behind the Prime Minister's Lodge in Deakin. The scouts helped with car parking, carrying messages, and stoking the wood-fired boilers at the restaurant marquees.

In 1934, Canberra Scouts attended the first Australian Scout Jamboree in Frankston, near Melbourne.

Lady Baden-Powell visited Canberra in 1948 and attended a reception in the grounds of Acton House. She visited again in 1967 when a rally was held at the Manuka Oval.

In 1957 to celebrate the 50th Anniversary, a camp was held in front of the Australian War Memorial.

Before 1981, Scouts in Canberra were part of the New South Wales branch Being part of the Queanbeyan and ACT District.

On 1 April 2006, Scouts in the Australian Capital Territory celebrated their branch's 25th anniversary with a party in Glebe Park, Canberra, where they were presented with the Key to the City of Canberra in recognition of service to the community. The scouts have decided to use the privilege to camp overnight in otherwise forbidden places in the city, for example on top of Mount Majura which is part of the Canberra Nature Park, under the Giant Mushroom in Belconnen Markets, in the middle of Page Oval and on an island in Lake Tuggeranong.

In 2006 there are approximately 1800 scouts in Canberra and 430 adult scout leaders.

== Gang Shows ==
- Canberra Gang Show - started in 1966.

== See also ==
- Baden-Powell Scouts' Association
