= Tuggeranong Homestead =

Coordinates: 35.4310°S 149.1105°E

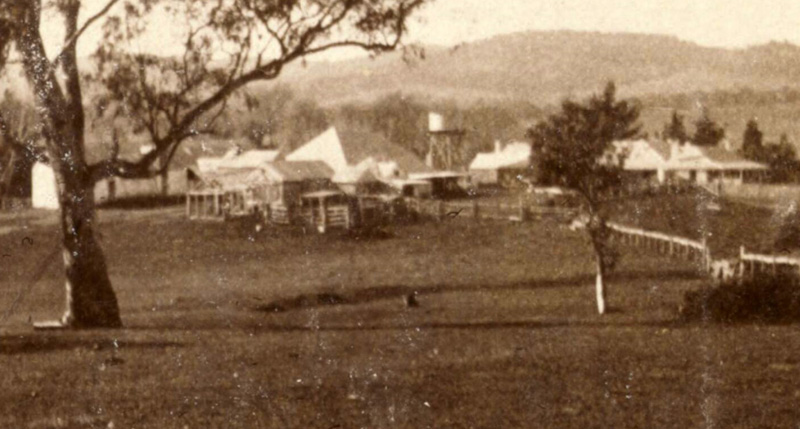
Tuggeranong Homestead in about 1910

Tuggeranong Homestead is located in the Australian Capital Territory in the area now covered by the suburb of Richardson. It is a property of historical significance and is listed on the ACT Heritage Register. It was owned by a succession of prominent pastoralists over the last century before it was resumed by the Government. Today it is used as a venue for special events, conferences and weddings.

== Early owners ==
The first authorised landowner of the Tuggeranong area following white settlement was Peter Murdoch, aide-de-camp of Thomas Brisbane, who was awarded a grant of 2,000 acres (8 km^{2}) in 1827. Following Murdoch's appointment to a position in Tasmania in 1829, the area became part of a grant to John McLaren who arrived from Glasgow in 1828. The property, then known as Janevale, was managed as a cattle station by McLaren's partner, William Wright (Moore, 1982). Tuggeranong was the original name of the whole of the Wanniassa and Lanyon areas. McLaren sold the property to Thomas Macquoid in 1835. Macquoid was the Sheriff of the Supreme Court who had arrived in the colony in 1829 (Lamb 2006) and died by his own hand on 12 October 1841.

== The Macquoid family ==
Thomas Macquoid who was the Sheriff of the Supreme Court of NSW bought the property in 1835 and named it "Waniassa" after an estate in Java where he had grown coffee crops for the East India Company. He built a stone cottage and barn using convict labour. The barn still exists although it has been adapted for other uses. Part of Macquoid's cottage was incorporated into the drawing room of the homestead when it was remodelled 1908.

In 1841 Macquoid ended his own life due to depression and financial hardship. His son Hya Macquoid took over management of the property and was able to pay his father's debts after some years. He was drowned on the ship Dunbar when it sank at South Head in Sydney in 1857. His body was never recovered.

== The Cunningham family ==
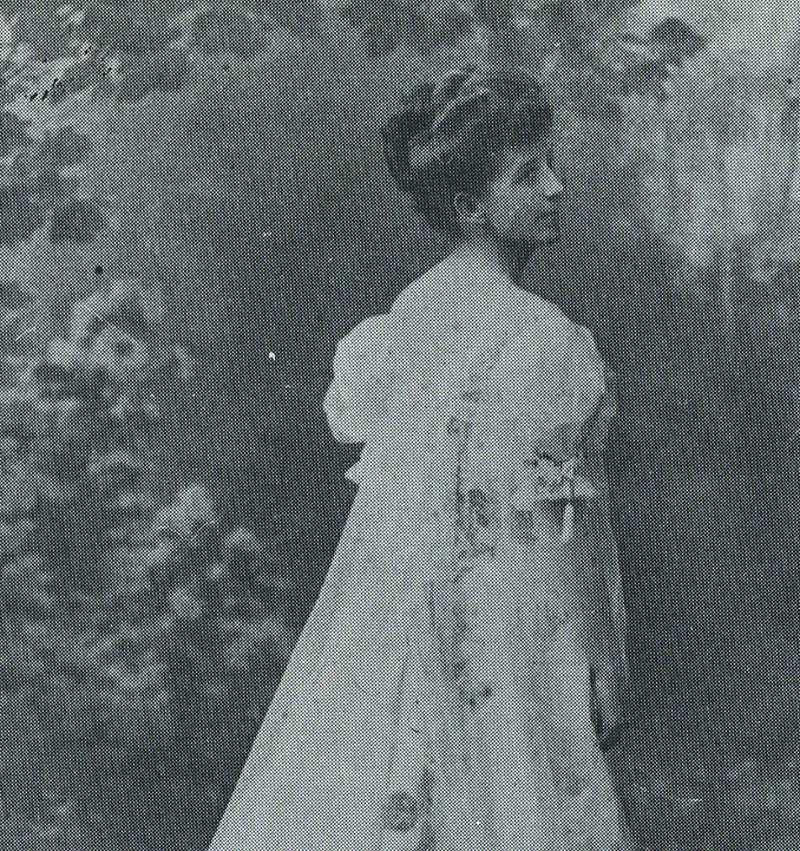
Mary Cunningham (formerly Twynam) in about 1889

The land was advertised for sale in 1858 and bought by Andrew Cunningham who owned Lanyon. In 1874 James (Jim) Cunningham who was Andrew's youngest son moved to the property which he called "Tuggranong" and lived in a small stone cottage. In 1889, aged 39, Jim married 19-year-old Mary Twynam, the daughter of Edward Twynam, the NSW Surveyor General. A photo of Mary at about this time is shown. Over the next twelve years the couple had eight children. Mary played her role as a successful pastoralist's wife attending balls, participating in fundraising activities for the parish church and local hospital. The homestead itself became the social hub of the district and Mary and Jim hosted many gatherings there.

Tuggeranong became a prosperous sheep property. Up to 50,000 were shorn there each year. Typically the shearing season started at the beginning of November when about twenty-five men were employed to undertake this task. They were sometimes local but often small landholders supplementing their income came from Tumut, Gundagai or other outlying places. After the shearing finished, usually in early December, there would be a Shearers Ball held in the woolshed to which all the community was invited. The Goulburn Evening Penny Post described the event held in 1898 in the following terms:

The annual Shearers Ball was held at the Tuggranong wool-shed on Thursday night and was a great success. From an early hour visitors from Queanbeyan, Tharwa and other places began to arrive and by nine o' clock there was a very large gathering present. On entering the wool-shed it could be seen at a glance that neither time nor trouble had been spared in decorating the place. The floor was in excellent order and every other arrangement complete... The supper was laid out in an adjoining building.

The Cunningham family left Tuggeranong Homestead in 1914 and went to Lanyon which Jim had purchased after his brother's death. The Government resumed the land to become part of the Federal Capital Territory. In 1919 Charles Bean was allowed to use the Homestead to undertake his mammoth task of writing the history of Australia's part in World War 1.

== Charles Bean and his team ==
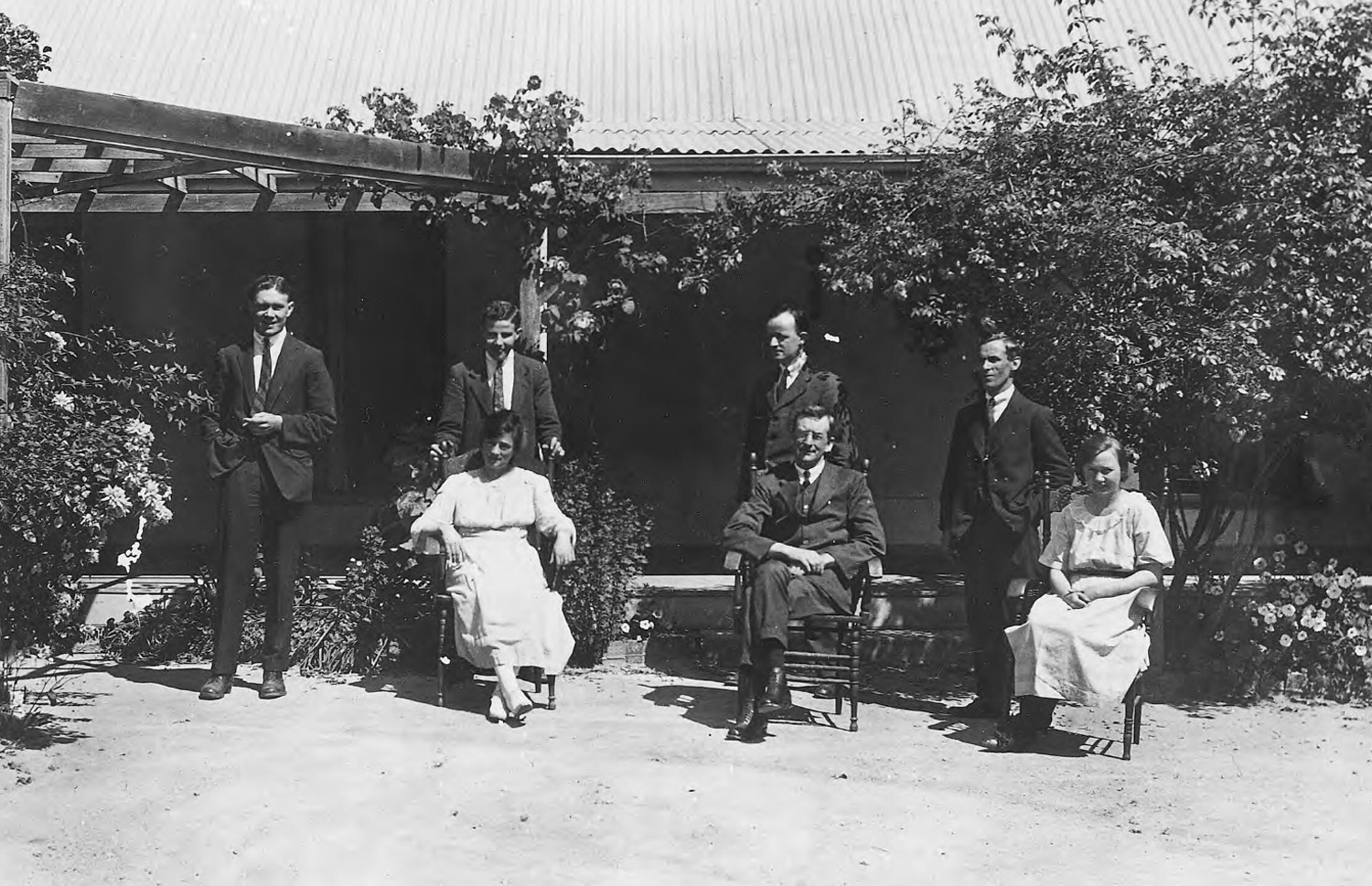
The Charles Bean War historian team at Tuggeranong in 1922. Seated L. to R. Mrs Bean, C.E.W. Bean, Mrs Bazley. Standing. A.W. Bazley, William Lowther, P. Wightman, J. Balfour

Charles Edwin Woodrow Bean was commissioned by the Government to write twelve volumes on the history of Australia's part in the War in 1919. He and his team commenced this project at Victoria Barracks in Melbourne but it was soon found that the many interruptions caused by the soldiers returning from the War who were interested in their work made progress very difficult. It was then decided that a peaceful location could be provided at Tuggeranong Homestead which was by this stage owned by the Government.

The team transferred there in October 1919 and remained there until April 1925. The Homestead provided living quarters as well as offices for most of the staff but two of the married men lived with their families in small cottages located about 400 metres away. At the back of the house was a large paddock where the team's horses were kept as well as a few sheep and a cow for milk. Water was pumped from Tuggeranong Creek which ran past one corner of the Homestead.

In later years Charles remembered the peace and tranquillity of the property. He said:

In the country air our nerves were easily refreshed by an hours ride. The garden of Tuggeranong under its beautiful trees became one of the sights of the Capital. In summer we arranged our own daylight saving and had tennis every evening

In 1920 Charles met his future wife Ethel Young a nursing sister at Queanbeyan Hospital when she came to one of the tennis matches. He married her the following year and she also lived at the Homestead.

Besides tennis the team had a passion for cricket and they built a sturdy cricket pitch which still remains today.

After they left in 1925 the Homestead stood empty for two years and then in 1927 the property was leased by Timothy McCormack.

== The McCormack family ==
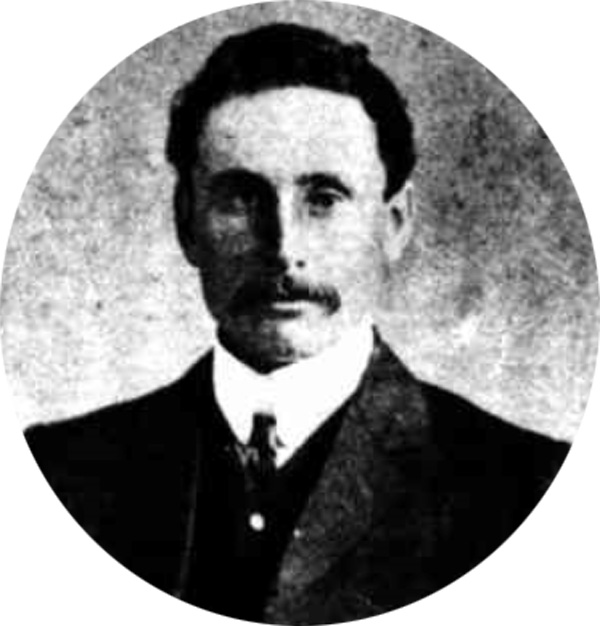
Timothy Joseph McCormack 1908

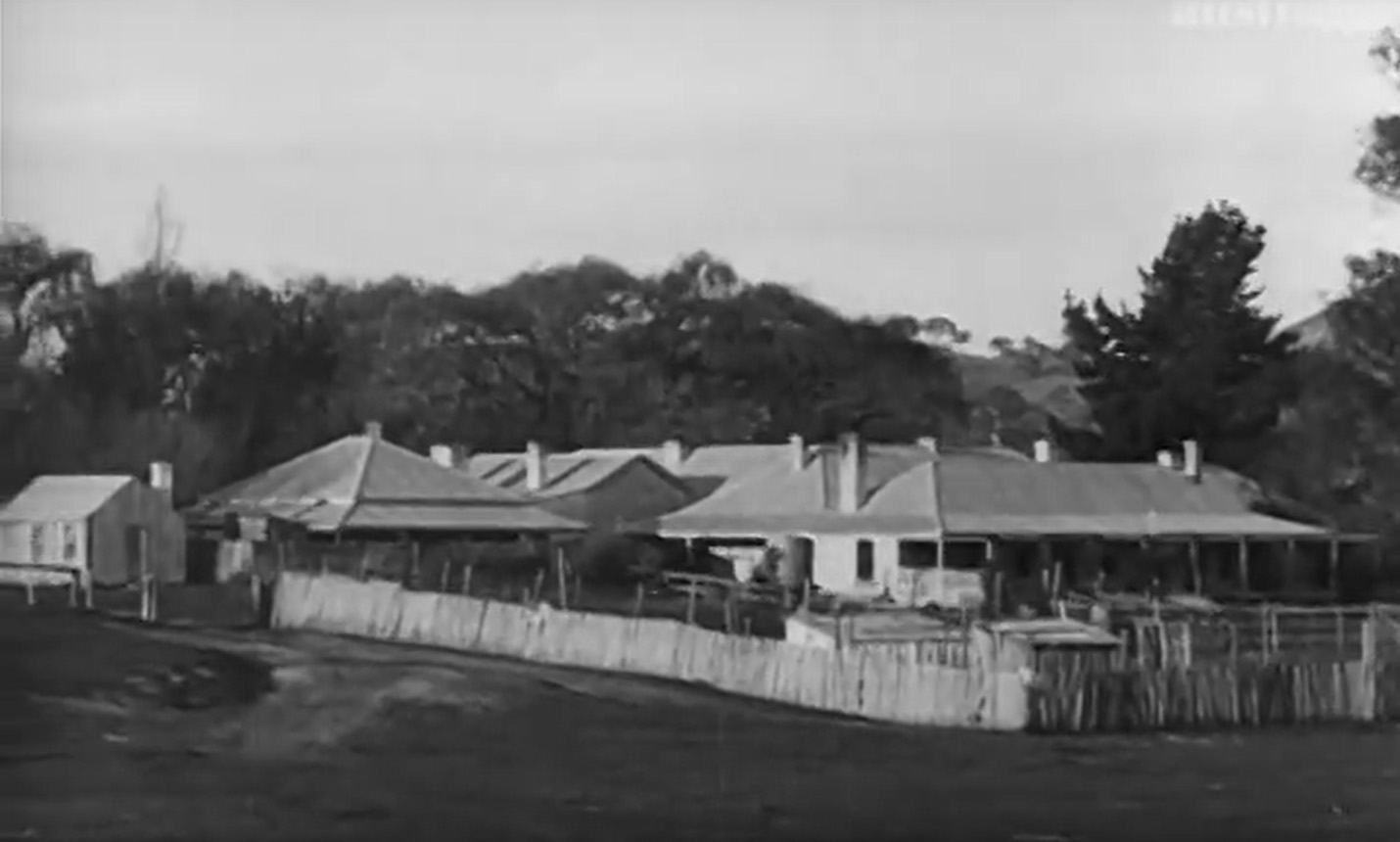
Tuggeranong Homestead in 1934

Timothy Joseph McCormack owned Tuggeranong Homestead from 1927 until his death in 1938. He also controlled properties in Crookwell and at Royalla. He was born in 1873 in Wheeo near Crookwell. His father also called Timothy worked on a farming property owned by his grandmother Catherine McCormack who had moved to the Crookwell district as a widow in 1863. His father died in 1882 when Timothy was nine years old. His mother remarried but he continued his association with his father's family at Wheeo.

In 1899 he married Mary Kennedy in Crookwell and the wedding was reported in many of the newspapers. Mary was the daughter of William Kennedy of Kialla who was a counsellor of the Crookwell Shire Council. The couple had five children three sons and two daughters.

In 1927 Timothy leased Tuggeranong and developed a fine grazing property which produced world class merino wool. He also planted cereal crops and improved pastures. The Homestead became a centre for sporting and social events. He also built a racetrack on the property and owned several champion racehorses. A photo of the first race meeting at this track is shown here. Timothy died in 1938 and Tuggeranong continued to be operated by the McCormack family until 1974 when it was compulsorily resumed by the Government for suburban development.

Although Canberra suburbs have been developed on much of the original property the homestead has been preserved on 65 acres (260,000 m^{2}) of surrounding land. The heritage-listed property currently hosts the Tuggeranong Homestead markets, on the first Sunday of every month, and is also a home for the Calwell Scout Group.

== Related books ==
- Barrow, G (1998). Canberra's Historic Houses. Dagraja Press, ACT. ISBN 0-9587552-2-1.
- Gillespie, L (1991). Canberra 1820 - 1913. AGPS, ACT. ISBN 0-644-08060-4.
- Moore, B (1982). The Lanyon Saga. Moore, ACT. ISBN 0-9594649-2-1.
- Lamb, R. (2006). Macquoid of Waniassa: Portrait of a Colonial Sheriff, Waniassa Publications, ACT, ISBN 0-9775237-0-5.
