= Lake Tuggeranong College =

Coordinates: 35.414°S 149.068°E

Location
- 123 Cowlishaw Street; Tuggeranong, Australian Capital Territory, 2900; Australia

Information
- Type: Public
- Motto: Committed to Quality
- Established: 1990
- Principal: David Briggs
- Enrolment: ~900
- Colours: Teal, white & black
- Website: www.ltc.act.edu.au

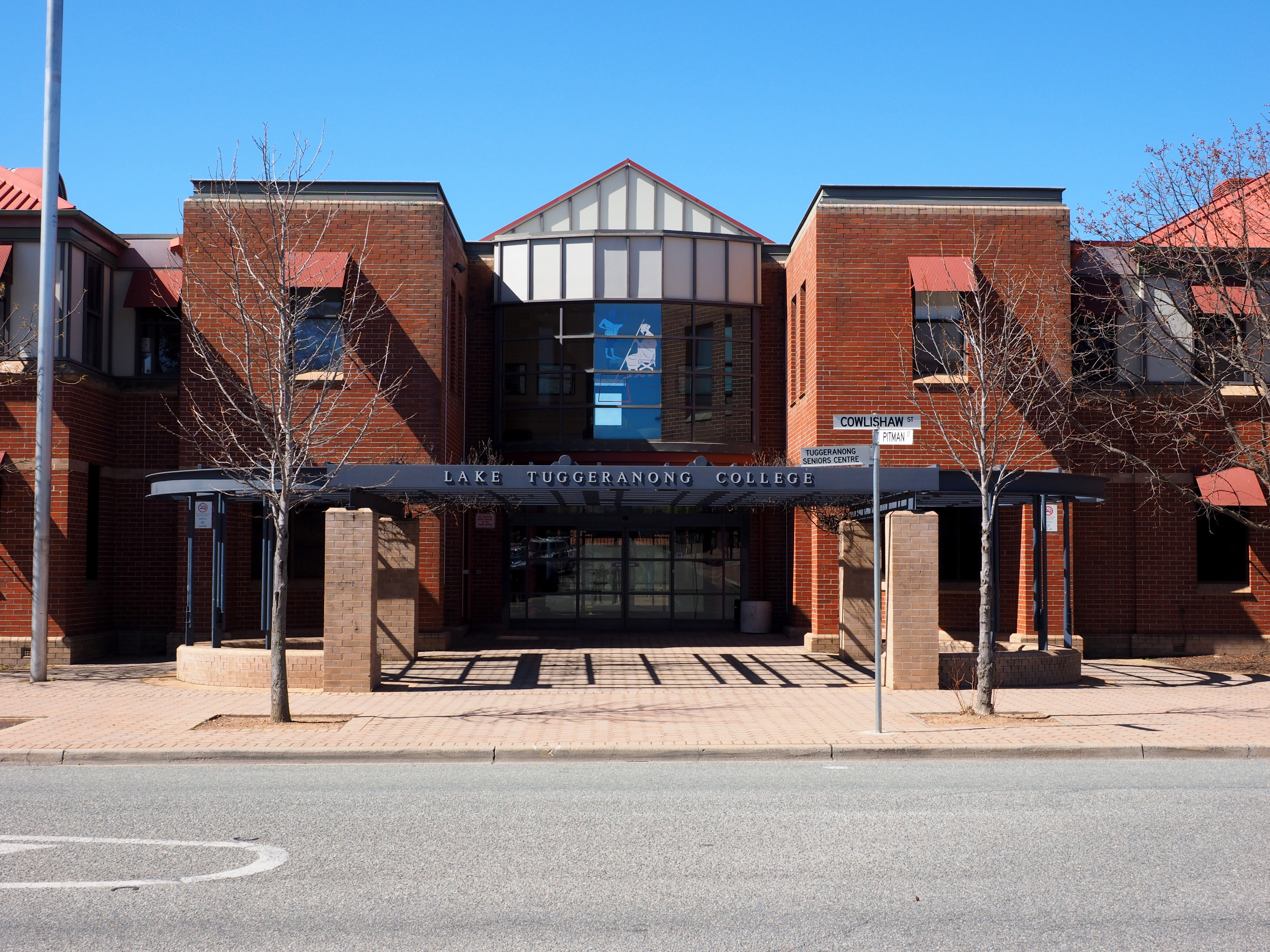
Lake Tuggeranong College in September 2018

Lake Tuggeranong College is an Australian Capital Territory public school catering to Year 11 and 12 students (aged between 16 and 20 years). It is located in Tuggeranong, Canberra, close to Tuggeranong Town Centre and on the shores of Lake Tuggeranong in Greenway. The principal is David Briggs.

== History ==
The school was established in 1990 under the oversight of principal Robert (Bob) McConchie. It was designed by architectural firm nEdwards, Madigan, Torzillo and Briggs, and architect Penleigh Boyd was in charge of construction. The enrolment consisted of approximately 400 students. The second principal, John See, was appointed in 1997. On the retirement of John See at the end of 2006, William (Bill) Maiden was appointed as principal. As of 2014 the college has over 734 students enrolled.

== Campus ==
The college is prominently positioned on the shores of Lake Tuggeranong, Greenway and is close to the Tuggeranong Town Centre and bus terminal. The college campus and the adjoining public library was designed by the firm Edwards Madigan Torzillo and Briggs, the same firm that designed the High Court of Australia building and National Gallery of Australia in Parkes.

Campus facilities include general use science laboratories; metal, wood, and auto technology workshops; a kitchen class room; sporting facilities including a rowing shed; drama, dance, art and photography studios; and teaching spaces from 20 person class rooms to an eighty-seat lecture theatre.

Tuggeranong Town Centre Library is adjacent to the college and is a joint-use facility catering for the educational needs of college students and for community use. The proximity of the library provides students with access to the ACT public library collection, free computing facilities and study space. Fully qualified Teacher Librarians, in addition to ACT Public Library staff, further the services provided to college students.

== Student admissions ==
Lake Tuggeranong College admits around 450 year 11 students each year. Education programs are offered for students intending to apply for university admission as well as those seeking vocational training. The college also provides for students with special needs, accepting children from special education schools. The college does not discriminate between students seeking higher tertiary education and vocational studies in its admissions process.

The campus culture is structured on university lines, with larger amounts of freedom of expression and emphasis on personal responsibility with regard to educational commitment than privately operated equivalent schools.

The ACT government does not allow schools to set compulsory fees to its domestic students, however the college Board suggests a voluntary contribution which includes a base sum of $180 per year. Around 60% of students pay this contribution.

Students enroll in 4 to 8 subjects, which are classified as to whether or not they constitute formal pre-tertiary training. If they have that T classification, students are ranked in the subject. Other vocational courses are designed to provide training for the work force or for personal educational enrichment.

Students who are enrolled in ASBAs only have to enroll in 4 subjects as they spend a day a week engaged in on-the-job training.

== See also ==
- List of schools in the Australian Capital Territory
