= Mount Wanniassa =

Mountain in Australian Capital Territory

Coordinates: 35.3895°S 149.1197°E

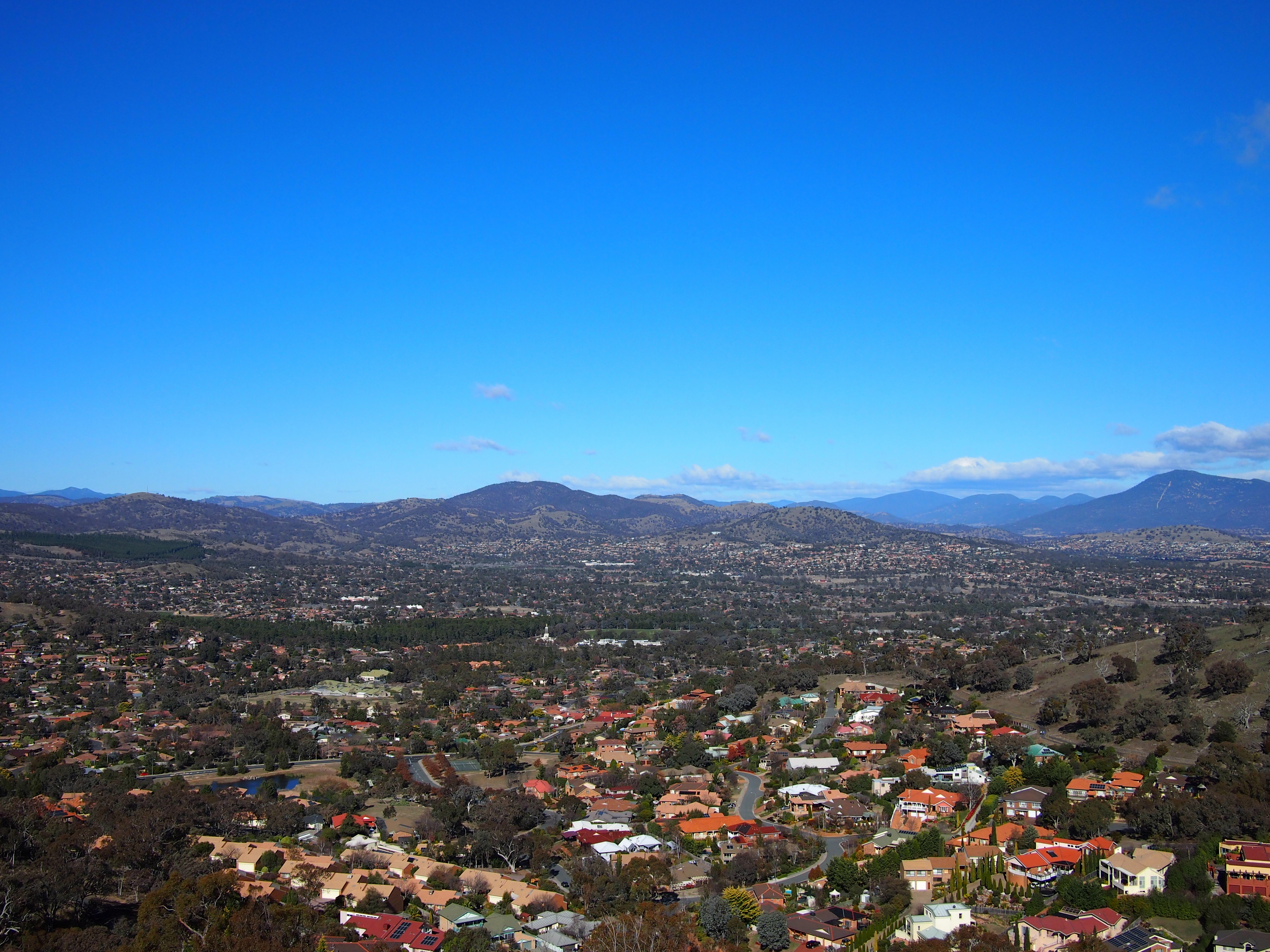
The view from Mount Wanniassa, looking south into the Tuggeranong Valley in 2013

Mount Wanniassa is a mountain peak located in Canberra, Australia, nestled between the suburbs of Wanniassa, Farrer, Isaacs and Fadden. The mountain is part of the Wanniassa Hills Nature Reserve, a Canberra Nature Park and adjacent to the Farrer Ridge Nature Reserve. Mount Wanniassa stands at 809 metres (2,654 ft) above sea level, and provides excellent views of the Woden and Tuggeranong areas of Canberra. The mountain can be climbed via the established walking trails on the east and west slopes.
