= Richardson, Australian Capital Territory =

Richardson
- Suburb
- Coordinates: 35°25′34″S 149°06′54″E
- Country: Australia
- State: Australian Capital Territory
- City: Canberra
- District: Tuggeranong
- Location: 21 km (13 mi) S of Canberra CBD; 16 km (9.9 mi) SW of Queanbeyan; 105 km (65 mi) SW of Goulburn; 302 km (188 mi) SW of Sydney
- Established: 1981

Government
  - Territory electorate: Brindabella
  - Federal division: Bean

Area
  - Total: 2.2 km^{2} (0.85 sq mi)
- Elevation: 609 m (1,998 ft)

Population
  - Total: 3,058 (2021 census)
  - Density: 1,390/km^{2} (3,600/sq mi)
- Postcode: 2905
- Gazetted: 5 May 1975
Suburbs around Richardson
Monash	Gowrie	Chisholm
Isabella Plains	Richardson	Canberra Nature Park
Calwell	Calwell	Theodore

Richardson is a suburb in the Canberra, Australia, district of Tuggeranong. It was gazetted on 5 May 1975. Streets are named after writers, especially female writers. It is next to the suburbs of Calwell, Isabella Plains, Gowrie and Chisholm. It is bounded by Johnson Drive, Ashley Drive and Isabella Drive. This suburb is named after the novelist Ethel Florence Lindesay Richardson (1870–1946) who wrote under the pen name Henry Handel Richardson.

== Demographics ==
At the 2021 census, Richardson had a population of 3,058. The median age of people in Richardson was 36 years, compared to a median age of 35 for the ACT. The median weekly individual income for Richardson in 2021 was $1,012, compared to $1,203 for the ACT, while the median weekly household income was $2,043.

The residents of Richardson are predominantly Australian born, with 75.6% being born in Australia. The three main countries of birth for those born overseas were England, 2.7%, India, 2.3% and New Zealand, 1.2%. The most popular religious affiliations in descending order are no religion, Catholic, Anglican and Islam.

== Suburb amenities and places of interest ==
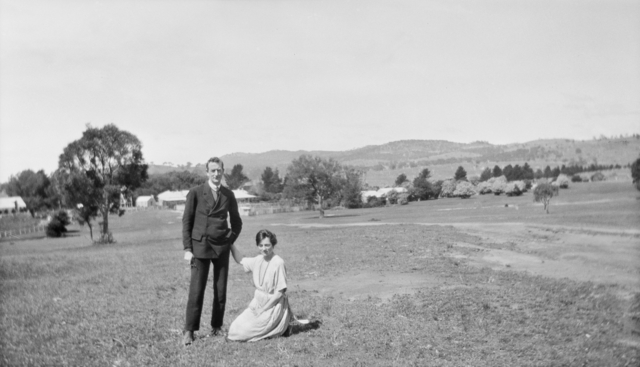
Charles Bean and his wife, Effie, in the grounds of Tuggeranong Station between 1919 and 1925.

Richardson Primary school, located on May Gibbs Close, opened in 1984; the school has a major focus on information and communications technology in education. Richardson Primary School was the first school within Australia to install Interactive Whiteboards. Richardson Preschool is also located on May Gibbs Close.

The Tuggeranong Homestead heritage site is accessed off Johnson Drive. The Richardson local centre and Richardson Oval are located on May Gibbs Close. Richardson also has a scout hall on Clift Crescent.

== Transport ==
Several ACTION bus routes service Richardson. Routes 74, 75 and 76 connect Richardson to Tuggeranong Town Centre and Erindale Centre. Route 78 connects Richardson to Tuggeranong Town Centre via Isabella Plains and Bonython.

== Geology ==
Quaternary alluvium covers the whole suburb. This would have formed by erosion of the surrounding Deakin Volcanics in Chisholm and the hills to the east. Deep underneath are volcanic rocks from the Silurian age at 414 Mya.
