= Tuggeranong =

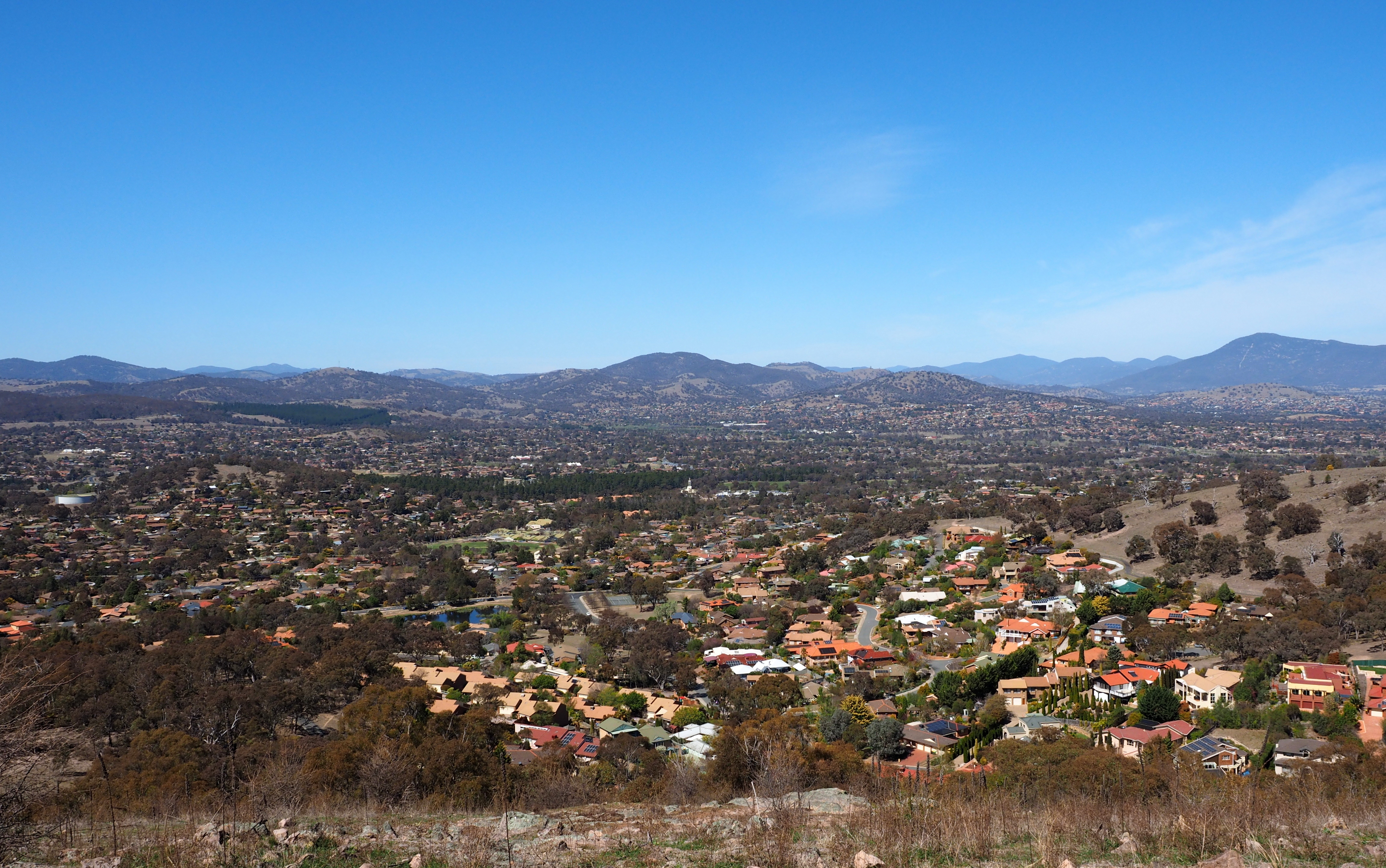
- The view from Mount Wanniassa, looking down into the Tuggeranong Valley in 2018

- Interactive map of Tuggeranong
- Coordinates: 35.4244°S 149.0888°E
- Country: Australia
- State: Australian Capital Territory
- Location: 22 km (14 mi) SSW of Canberra

Government
  - Territory electorate: Brindabella
  - Federal division: Bean

Population
  - Total: 89,461 (2021 census)
- Gazetted: 12 May 1966
Localities around Tuggeranong
Stromlo	Woden Valley / Weston Creek	Jerrabomberra
Paddys River	Tuggeranong	New South Wales
Tennent	New South Wales	New South Wales

Tuggeranong (/ˈtʌɡərənɒŋ/) is a district in the Australian Capital Territory in Australia. The district is subdivided into divisions (suburbs), sections and blocks and is the southernmost district of Canberra. The district comprises nineteen suburbs and occupies 117 square kilometres (45 sq mi) to the east of the Murrumbidgee River.

The name Tuggeranong is derived from a Ngunnawal expression meaning "cold place". From the earliest colonial times, the plain extending south into the centre of the present-day territory was referred to as Tuggeranong.

At the 2021 census, the population of the district was 89,461.

== Establishment and governance ==
Following the transfer of land from the Government of New South Wales to the Commonwealth Government in 1911, the district was established in 1966 by the Commonwealth via the gazettal of the Districts Ordinance 1966 (Cth) which, after the enactment of the Australian Capital Territory (Self-Government) Act 1988, became the Districts Act 1966. This Act was subsequently repealed by the ACT Government and the district is now administered subject to the Districts Act 2002.

=== History ===
Cave paintings and Aboriginal artifacts discovered in the area confirm that the Tuggeranong region has been occupied by the original inhabitants, the Ngunnawal people, for over 21,000 years. The area lies close to the recognised traditional lands of the Ngarigo-speaking people.

The first Europeans arrived in the Australian Capital Territory region in 1820 and a year later, a third expedition led by Charles Throsby reached the Murrumbidgee River near the present-day Pine Island and the valley now occupied by the Tuggeranong district. In 1823 Joseph Wild was employed by Brigade Major John Ovens and Captain Mark Currie to guide them to the Murrumbidgee. They travelled south along the river and named the area now known as Tuggeranong Isabella's Plain in honour of Governor Brisbane's infant daughter. Unable to cross the river near the current site of Tharwa, they continued on to the Monaro Plains.

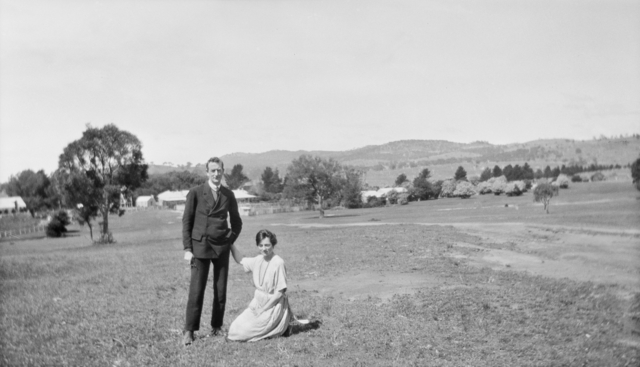
Charles Bean and his wife, Effie, in the grounds of Tuggeranong Station between 1919 and 1925.

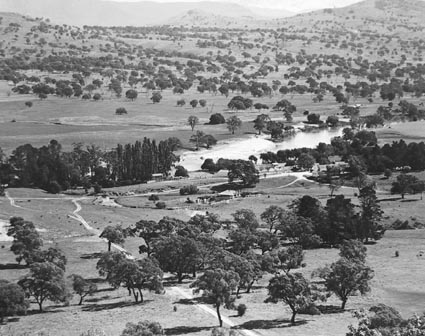
Aerial view of Lanyon station in 1950

The last expedition in the region was undertaken by Allan Cunningham in 1824. Cunningham's reports verified that the region was suitable for grazing, and the settlement of the Limestone Plains followed immediately thereafter.

In 1828, the bushranger John Tennant, known as the 'Terror of Argyle', was captured by James Ainslie and a party of others near the Murrumbidgee River in Tuggeranong. Tennant had been a convict assigned to Joshua John Moore at Canberry, a property in the present day inner north Canberra. Mount Tennent, behind Tharwa, is named after the bushranger (note the difference in spelling).

The first authorised settler was James Murdoch. In 1824 he was offered a land grant on a small plain known by the local Aboriginal people as 'Togranong' meaning 'cold plains'. He took up the grant in 1827. Lanyon station was established in 1835 and originally owned by James Wright, his brother William and John Lanyon. Wright bought the property from Lanyon, who had only remained in Australia for three years. In 1838, Wright commenced the building of the homestead, which he named after his partner, Lanyon. The homestead was built with the strength of a fort to withstand the attacks of bushrangers. Wright sold to the Cunningham family in 1847. In 1835 Thomas Macquoid, then Sheriff of the New South Wales Supreme Court, bought Tuggeranong station then known as Waniassa property (sic). The rural depression of 1840 hit hard and Macquoid committed suicide, fearing bankruptcy when he lost a civil suit brought by one William Henry Barnes. His son took over the estate and creditors allowed him to continue to operate it until it was sold by the Macquoid family in 1858 to the Cunningham family, owners of the neighbouring Lanyon property. They renamed Waniassa to Tuggranong. The whole area was part of the Tuggeranong parish in the late nineteenth century. Tuggranong homestead was rebuilt by the Cunningham family in 1908. In 1917 it was resumed by the Commonwealth Government for military purposes. The Cunningham family remained at Lanyon until 1926. Charles Bean, together with his staff, wrote the first two volumes of the twelve volume official history of Australia's involvement in World War I at the homestead from 1919 to 1925. The Tuggeranong property was leased as a grazing property by the McCormack family from 1927 to 1976.

In 1973, the third of the new towns planned for the Australian Capital Territory was inaugurated at Tuggeranong on 21 February. It was originally planned to house between 180,000 to 220,000 people. Planning for the new town had begun in 1969. The first families moved into the suburb of Kambah in 1974. The fifth Canberra fire station opened at Kambah in 1979 to service the new developing satellite city.

Every tree in the Tuggeranong valley was plotted on aerial photographs and rated according to condition and site. Only those in bad condition or where removal was necessary was destroyed. 40,000 new native trees had been planted by March 1973, and 40,000 more were planned to be planted by the end of 1973.

Norman Russell Symons was the Transport Planning Engineer of the National Capital Development Commission from 1972-1975 with responsibility for all transport planning for Tuggeranong. His responsibility included planning for freeways, arterial roads, residential streets and traffic distribution for office, retail and industrial areas, including local and "metropolitan line-haul" public transport systems.

Other locations for the Tuggeranong Town Centre were evaluated, including "Kambah Group Centre" (near Kambah Village Shopping Centre), "Oxley", "Erindale" (near Erindale Centre), "Isabella Plains North/East Knoll", and part of the originally identified 1970 site (the current site).

There are unpublished historical reports detailing Tuggeranong's archeological history, such as 1975 research by Anne Bickford.

== Location and urban structure ==
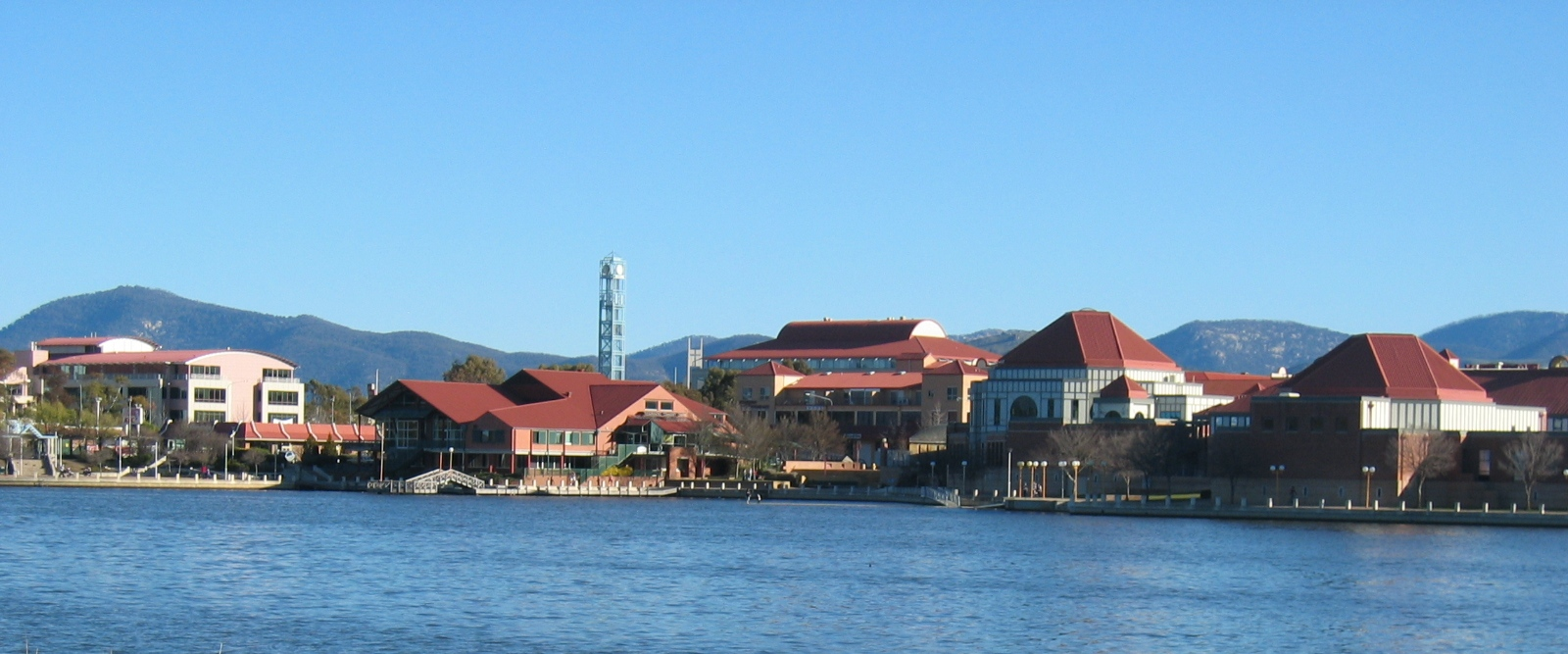
Tuggeranong Town Centre is located on Lake Tuggeranong

The district is a set of contiguous residential suburbs consolidated around Lake Tuggeranong, in addition to vast pastoral leases that extend south of the suburbs of Banks, Conder and Gordon. The boundaries of the district are constrained by the Murrumbidgee River to the west, the border with the state of New South Wales to the south and east, and pastoral leases that mark the district's boundary to the north, including the remnants of the Tuggeranong Homestead, and to the north-west.

Lake Tuggeranong was created in 1987 by the construction of a dam on a tributary of the Murrumbidgee River. On the edge of the lake are a number of community facilities, including Lake Tuggeranong College, a school catering to years 11 and 12 (16–18 years old); a library, which is part of the ACT Library and Information Services, a community centre, and the Tuggeranong Arts Centre.

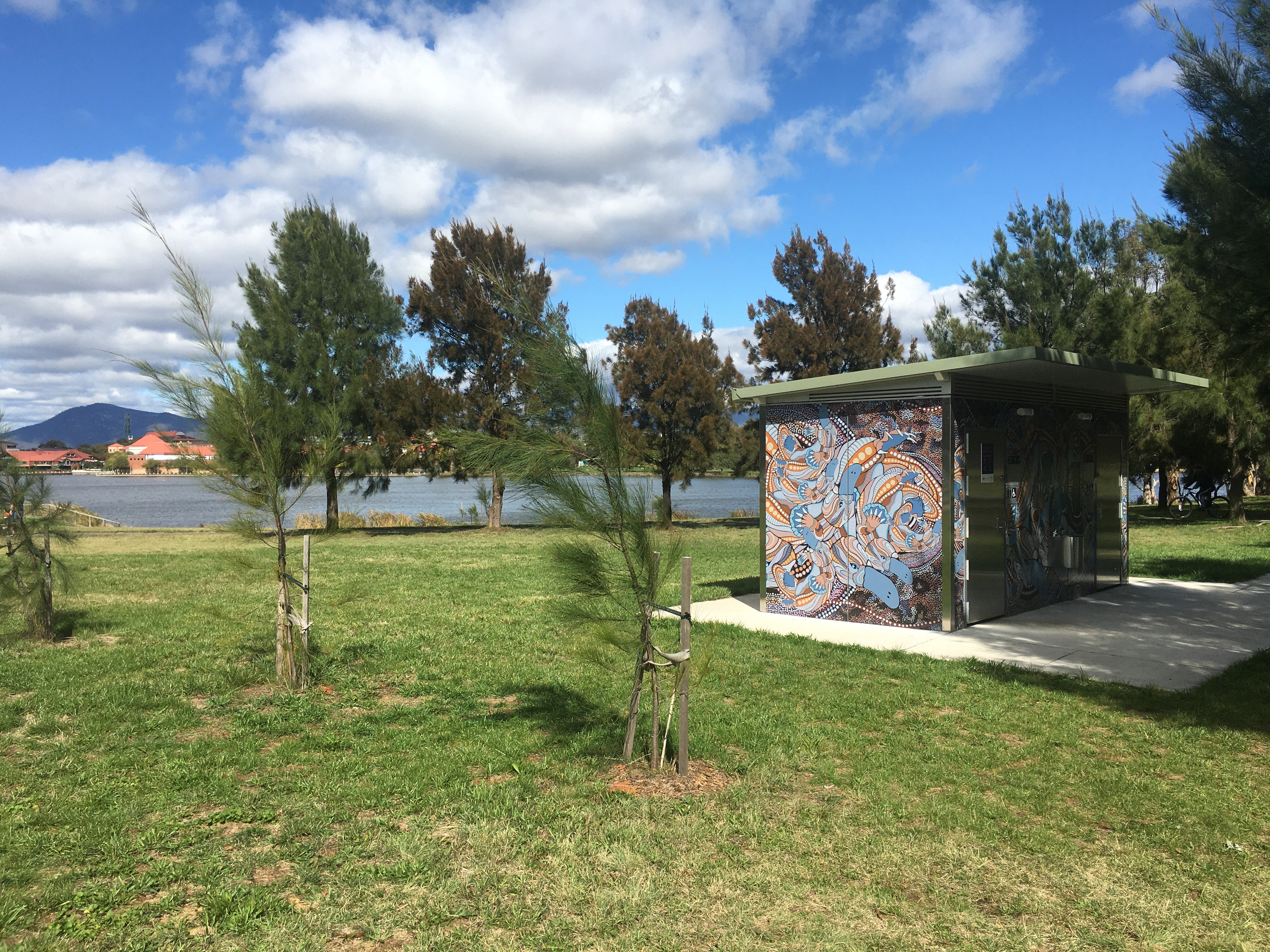
Wiradjuri artist Kristie Peters' mural Platypus Story in the Lake Tuggeranong District Park

The Tuggeranong Town Centre is to the west of the lake. It includes a major shopping centre, known as South.Point; managed, developed and part owned by Vicinity Centres. It is surrounded by offices of the Australian and ACT governments, and a light industrial area.

A further heavy industrial area is located in the suburb of Hume that lies partly in the districts of both Tuggeranong and Jerrabomberra.

== Climate ==
Tuggeranong has a temperate highland climate (Cfb) with dry, warm to hot summers and cool to cold winters. Frost is very common in the winter and snowfall occasionally occurs.

Climate data for Tuggeranong
Month	Jan	Feb	Mar	Apr	May	Jun	Jul	Aug	Sep	Oct	Nov	Dec	Year
Record high °C (°F)	43.3 (109.9)	41.5 (106.7)	37.0 (98.6)	31.6 (88.9)	24.5 (76.1)	20.1 (68.2)	18.7 (65.7)	22.5 (72.5)	29.4 (84.9)	32.7 (90.9)	38.7 (101.7)	39.8 (103.6)	43.3 (109.9)
Mean daily maximum °C (°F)	29.5 (85.1)	28.1 (82.6)	25.3 (77.5)	21.1 (70.0)	16.6 (61.9)	13.1 (55.6)	12.3 (54.1)	14.1 (57.4)	17.6 (63.7)	20.9 (69.6)	24.3 (75.7)	27.1 (80.8)	20.8 (69.4)
Mean daily minimum °C (°F)	14.3 (57.7)	14.2 (57.6)	11.4 (52.5)	6.9 (44.4)	2.5 (36.5)	1.3 (34.3)	0.0 (32.0)	0.9 (33.6)	3.8 (38.8)	6.4 (43.5)	9.8 (49.6)	12.3 (54.1)	7.0 (44.6)
Record low °C (°F)	3.8 (38.8)	3.4 (38.1)	0.5 (32.9)	−4.1 (24.6)	−6.1 (21.0)	−8.1 (17.4)	−8.2 (17.2)	−8.4 (16.9)	−5.5 (22.1)	−2.3 (27.9)	−0.8 (30.6)	1.2 (34.2)	−8.4 (16.9)
Average precipitation mm (inches)	53.5 (2.11)	71.7 (2.82)	51.5 (2.03)	33.5 (1.32)	23.4 (0.92)	54.3 (2.14)	40.9 (1.61)	48.2 (1.90)	60.8 (2.39)	51.5 (2.03)	77.6 (3.06)	68.4 (2.69)	631.3 (24.85)
Average precipitation days	7.4	7.1	6.8	6.0	5.9	10.3	11.1	9.1	8.6	8.4	9.6	8.3	98.6
Average relative humidity (%)	34	39	38	42	50	57	56	50	46	41	39	34	44

== Representation ==
Tuggeranong is represented by:

- ACT Legislative Assembly: The Australian Capital Territory (ACT) was granted self-government by the Commonwealth Parliament in 1988 with the passage of the Australian Capital Territory (Self-Government) Act 1988. The first Assembly was elected in 1989. There are currently 25 members of the Legislative Assembly (MLAs). Members are elected every four years by the people of the ACT to represent them and make decisions on their behalf. The ACT Legislative Assembly has five multi-member electorates: Yerrabi; Ginninderra; Kurrajong; Murrumbidgee and; Brindabella, each electing five members.
- Tuggeranong Community Council: Tuggeranong Community Council is recognised by the ACT Government as a community body representing the interests of the local residents, businesses and organisations within the Tuggeranong region with the ACT Government. The Tuggeranong Community Council Is not a local government.

== Demographics ==
Historical population
Year	Pop.	±%
1996 census	86,666	—
2001 census	89,386	+3.1%
2006 census	87,119	−2.5%
2011 census	86,900	−0.3%
2016 census	85,154	−2.0%
2021 census	89,461	+5.1%

At the 2021 census, there were 89,461 people in the Tuggeranong district, of these 49.2 per cent were male and 50.8 per cent were female. Aboriginal and Torres Strait Islander people made up 3.0 per cent of the population, which was lower than the national average, but higher than the territory average. The median age of people in the Tuggeranong district was 38 years, similar to the national median. Children aged 0–14 years made up 19.2 per cent of the population and people aged 65 years and over made up 15.6 per cent of the population. Of people in the area aged 15 years and over, 49.1 per cent were married and 12.3 per cent were either divorced or separated.

Population growth in the Tuggeranong district between the 2001 census and the 2006 census was 0.85 per cent; in the five years to the 2011 census, the population decreased by 0.25 per cent; in the five years to the 2016 census, the population decreased by 2.0 per cent and in the five years to the 2021 census, the population increased by 5.1 per cent. When compared with total population growth of Australia for the same periods, being 5.79, 8.32, 8.81 and 8.64 per cent respectively, population growth in Tuggeranong district was significantly lower than the national average. The median weekly income for residents within the Tuggeranong district was significantly higher than the national average, and slightly lower than the territory average.

At the 2021 census, the proportion of residents in the Tuggeranong district who stated their ancestry as Australian or Anglo-Saxon exceeded 70 per cent of all residents (national average was 62.9 per cent). Meanwhile, at the census date, compared to the national average, households in the Tuggeranong district had a lower than average proportion (18.5 per cent) where a language other than English was spoken (national average was 24.8 per cent); and a higher proportion (81.0 per cent) where English only was spoken at home (national average was 72.0 per cent).

Selected historical census data for the Tuggeranong district
Census year		2001	2006	2011	2016	2021
Population	Estimated residents on census night	86,386	87,119	86,900	85,154	89,461
Population	District rank in terms of size within the Australian Capital Territory	1st	1st	▼2nd	2nd	▼3rd
Population	Percentage of the Australian Capital Territory population	27.9%	26.9%	24.3%	21.4%	19.7%
Population	Percentage of the Australian population	0.46%	▼0.44%	▼0.40%	▼0.36%	▼0.35%
Cultural and language diversity						
Ancestry, top responses	Australian			29.6%	26.4%	37.1%
Ancestry, top responses	English			25.6%	26.2%	36.3%
Ancestry, top responses	Irish			8.9%	9.5%	12.3%
Ancestry, top responses	Scottish			7.2%	7.7%	10.8%
Ancestry, top responses	German			3.3%	3.1%	4.6%
Language, top responses (other than English)	Arabic		0.7%	▲0.9%	▲1.0%	▲1.2%
Language, top responses (other than English)	Malayalam					1.0%
Language, top responses (other than English)	Vietnamese	0.8%	0.8%	▲0.9%	▼0.8%	0.8%
Language, top responses (other than English)	Spanish	0.8%	▼0.7%	0.7%	▲0.8%	0.8%
Language, top responses (other than English)	Mandarin				0.7%	0.7%
Language, top responses (other than English)	Italian	0.8%	▼0.7%	0.7%	▼0.6%	
Religious affiliation						
Religious affiliation, top responses	No Religion	16.8%	▲20.3%	▲25.3%	▲32.6%	▲41.9%
Religious affiliation, top responses	Catholic	32.3%	▼31.1%	▼30.3%	▼26.7%	▼23.7%
Religious affiliation, top responses	Anglican	19.8%	▼18.5%	▼17.1%	▼13.4%	▼10.4%
Religious affiliation, top responses	Uniting Church	4.2%	▼3.7%	▼3.1%	▼2.4%	
Religious affiliation, top responses	Presbyterian and Reformed	3.2%	▼2.9%	▼2.7%		
Median weekly incomes						
Personal income	Median weekly personal income		A$703	A$900	A$955	A$1,140
Personal income	Percentage of Australian median income		150.9%	▲156.0%	▼144.0%	▼141.6%
Family income	Median weekly family income		A$1,716	A$2,203	A$2,340	A$2,709
Family income	Percentage of Australian median income		146.5%	▲148.8%	▼134.9%	▼127.8%
Household income	Median weekly household income		A$1,547	A$1,962	A$2,051	A$2,305
Household income	Percentage of Australian median income		150.6%	▲159.0%	▼142.6%	▼132.0%

== List of suburbs ==
- Banks
- Bonython
- Calwell
- Chisholm
- Conder
- Fadden
- Gilmore
- Gordon
- Gowrie
- Greenway
- Hume
- Isabella Plains
- Kambah
- Macarthur
- Monash
- Oxley
- Richardson
- Theodore
- Wanniassa

A 1975 map of the proposed suburb names in Tuggeranong shows that many more suburbs were planned, and that the eventual layout of Tuggeranong is very different from what the planners were thinking. It was proposed that residential development would occur west of the Murrumbidgee River, a corridor that is subsequently free of urban development. Suburbs planned (but not built, or had their names changed) were:

- Bass
- Batman
- Boyer
- Chippindall
- Denison
- Dobell
- Dunrossil
- Fawkner
- Flinders
- Franklin (now a suburb of the Gungahlin district)
- Freshford
- Heysen
- Hume (now an industrial suburb of the Tuggeranong and Jerrabomberra districts)
- Lindsay
- Maccallum
- Murdoch
- Niland
- Paterson
- Pedder
- Slessor
- Somers
- Stuart
- Throsby (now a suburb of the Gungahlin district)
- Wakefield
- Wardell
- Woodward

== Places of note and interest ==
- South.Point Tuggeranong – large regional shopping centre
- Lanyon Homestead – a historic grazing property
- Tuggeranong Arts Centre – a community facility including workshops, gallery, dance studio and theatre.
- Tuggeranong Hill – a large mountain overlooking the valley.
- Tuggeranong Homestead – a historic homestead now operated as a café and function or event centre.
- Tuggeranong Town Centre – the town centre
