= Fadden, Australian Capital Territory =

Fadden
- Suburb
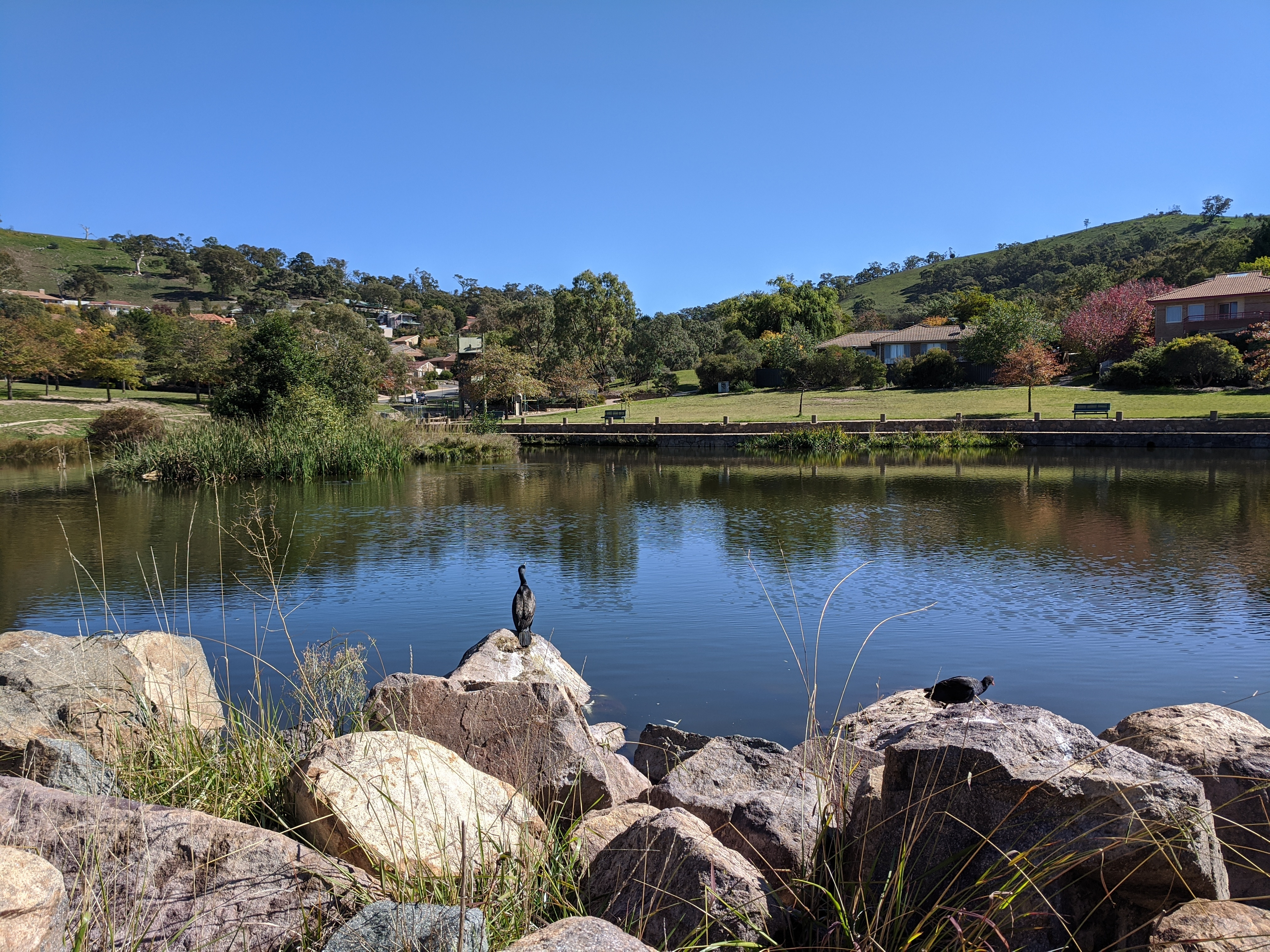
- Fadden Hills Pond

- Coordinates: 35°24′07″S 149°07′05″E
- Country: Australia
- State: Australian Capital Territory
- City: Canberra
- District: Tuggeranong
- Established: 1981

Government
  - Territory electorate: Brindabella
  - Federal division: Bean

Area
  - Total: 3.1 km^{2} (1.2 sq mi)

Population
  - Total: 3,006 (2021 census)
  - Density: 970/km^{2} (2,510/sq mi)
- Postcode: 2904
- Gazetted: 5 August 1975
Suburbs around Fadden
	Canberra Nature Park
Wanniassa	Fadden
	Gowrie	Macarthur

Fadden is a suburb in the Canberra, Australia district of Tuggeranong. The suburb is named after Sir Arthur Fadden, Prime Minister of Australia briefly in 1941. It was gazetted on 5 August 1975. Its streets are named after Queensland politicians. It is surrounded by Macarthur, Gowrie and Wanniassa. It is bounded by Erindale Drive, the Wanniassa Hills Nature Reserve, Fadden Pine Plantation and Sternberg Crescent.

== Demographics ==
At the 2021 census, Fadden had a population of 3,006 people. The median age of people in Fadden was 43 years, an increase from 35 in 2001, compared to a median age of 35 for the ACT. The median weekly individual income for Fadden in 2021 was $1,415, up from 1,197 in 2016, $1,054 in 2011, $819 in 2006 and $600–$699 in 2001, compared to $1,203 for the ACT. The median weekly household income was $3,302 up from $1,509 in 2006.

The residents of Fadden are predominantly Australian born, with 75.3% being born in Australia, compared to 76.5% in 2011 and 77.5% in 2001. In 2021 the three countries of birth for those born overseas were England, 4.2%, China, 1.7%, India, 1.6%, South Africa, 1.0% and United States, 0.9%. This compares to United Kingdom, 5.7%, New Zealand, 1.1%, and Croatia, 0.9% in 2001. The most popular religious affiliations in descending order are no religion, Catholic, Anglican and Orthodox.

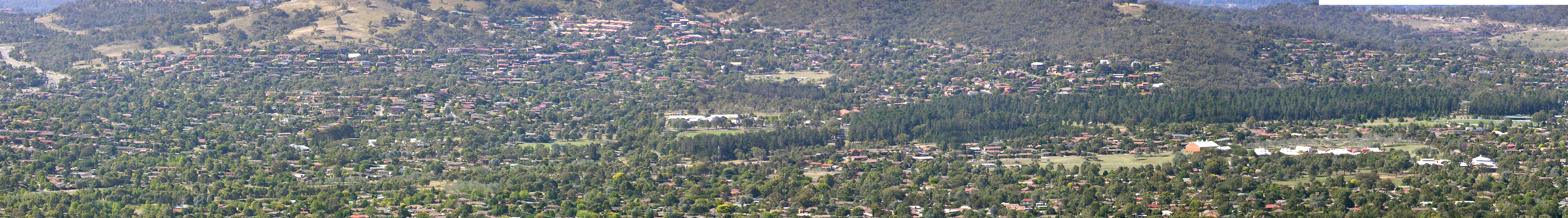
Fadden from Tuggeranong Hill. Fadden pines are the dark trees on the right. The backdrop is Wanniassa Hills

== Suburb amenities ==
=== Shops ===
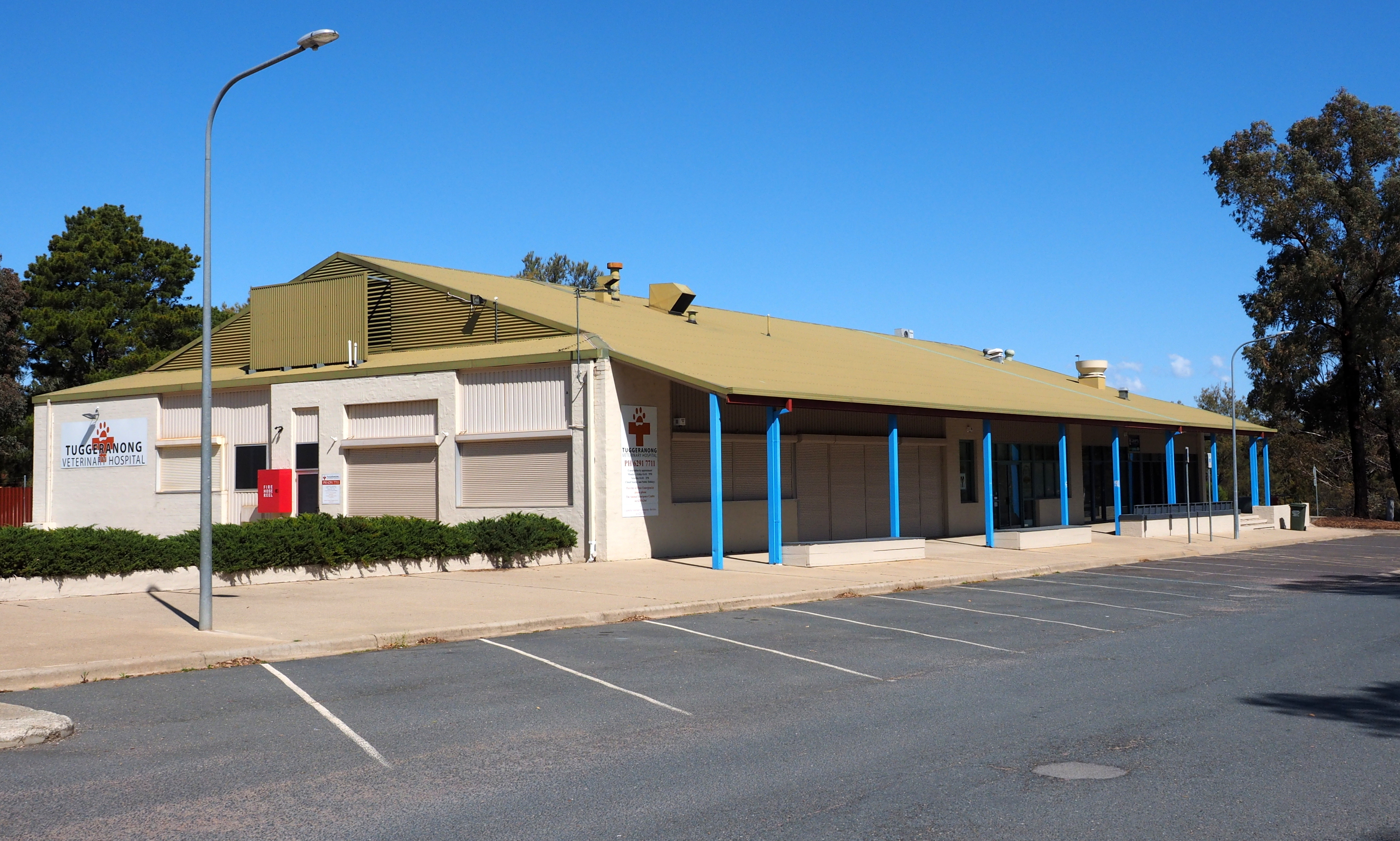
Fadden shops

The Fadden local shopping centre is located on Hanlon Crescent and includes a hairdresser, a medical centre, a Chiropractor and massage therapist, and a veterinary hospital. Fadden's sporting facilities include the Fadden Neighbourhood Oval, at the back of the primary school, and tennis courts off Stopford Crescent. Two areas of the Canberra Nature Park are located in the suburb: Wanniassa Hills to the north of the suburb and the smaller Macarthur Hill in the east. Hannah Community Park straddles the border with Gowrie. The Fadden Pine Plantation, a recreational area with substantial playground and barbecue facilities, is located between Isabella Drive, Bugden Avenue and Coyne Street. The Macarthur Scout Hall is located on Coyne Street.

== Education ==
Fadden Primary School is located on Hanlon Crescent. Fadden Primary caters for preschool and kindergarten to year 6.

== Transport ==
Several ACTION bus routes service Fadden. Routes 74 and 75 combine as a circular bus route which connects Fadden and surrounding suburbs with the Tuggeranong Town Centre and Erindale Centre. Route 76 connects Fadden, Gowrie and Macarthur to Erindale Centre and Tuggeranong Town Centre.

== Geology ==
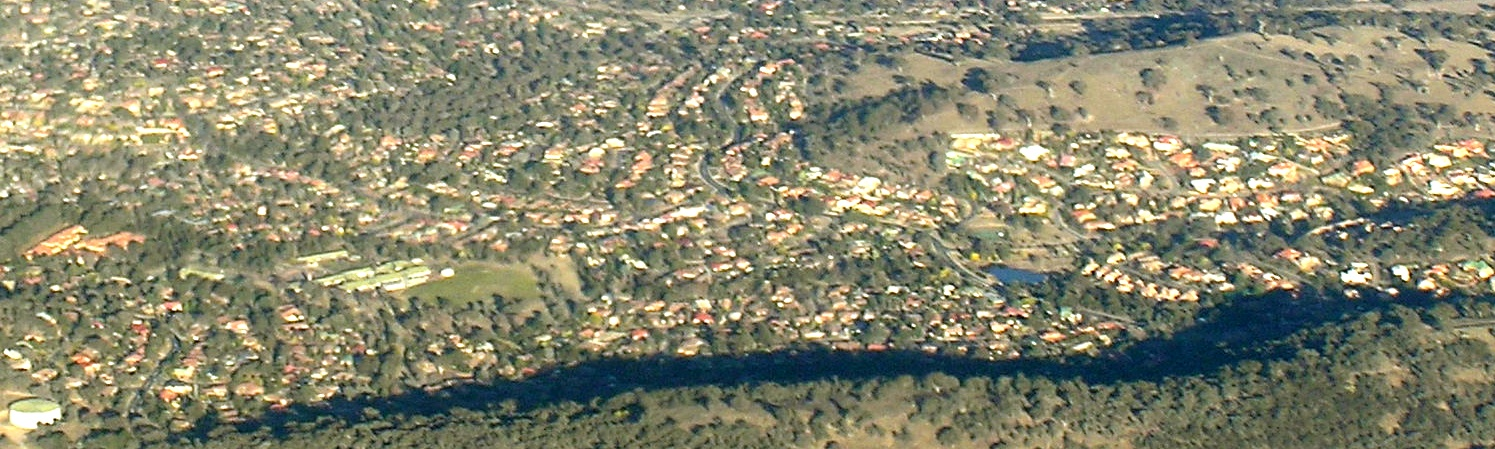
Aerial view from east

In the east, Fadden is built on Alluvium. The west of Fadden consists of Deakin Volcanics rhyolite. The rhyolite can be coloured green-grey, purple or cream, and dates from the Silurian age at 414±9 My. A fault heads north-north-west from Macarthur Hill with a quartz outcrop.
