= Calthorpes' House =

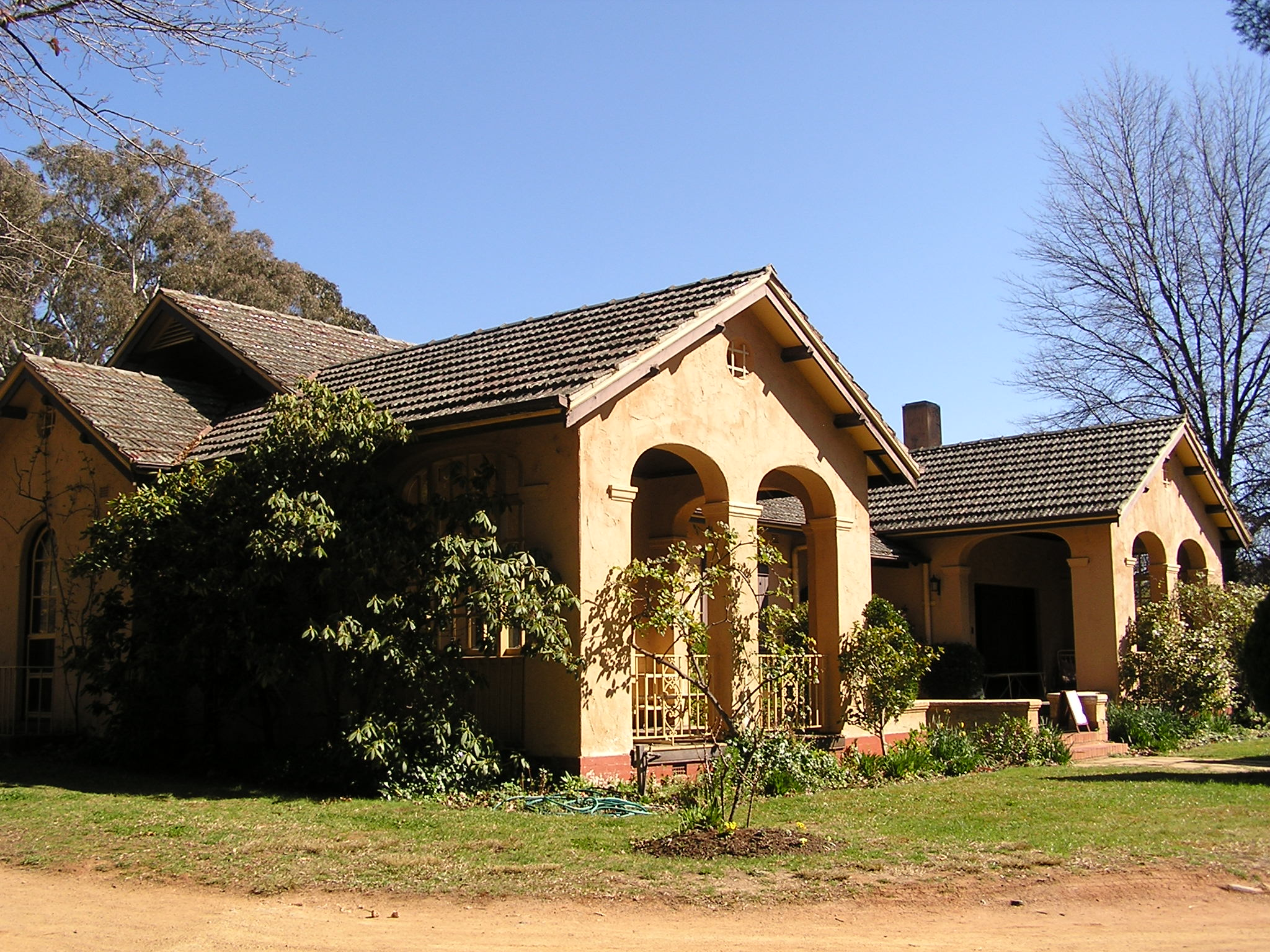

General information
- Status: Used as a museum
- Type: Residence
- Location: 24 Mugga Way, Red Hill, ACT, Australia
- Completed: 1927

Design and construction
- Architect: Ken Oliphant
- Architecture firm: Oakley and Parkes

Register of the National Estate
- Official name: Calthorpes House
- Designated: 25 March 1986
- Reference no.: 13374

Calthorpes' House is a heritage-listed house located at 24 Mugga Way, Red Hill, Canberra, Australian Capital Territory.

It was built in 1927 for Harry and Dell Calthorpe. Harry Calthorpe was a partner in Calthorpe and Woodger, a successful Queanbeyan-based stock and station and real estate agency. The house was designed by Ken Oliphant of Oakley and Parkes, the architectural firm responsible for the residence of the Prime Minister of Australia, The Lodge. Sir Charles Rosenthal had initially been selected to design the house; however, his plans were not used.

Harry Calthorpe died at age 59 in 1950, and Dell Calthorpe remained in the house until her death in 1979. The house and its contents had remained largely unchanged for many years, and both the Calthorpe family and historians recognised its historical value and later, potential for a house museum. It was purchased by the Government of Australia in late 1984, and was opened as a museum in 1986. It continues to operate as a museum today.

Calthorpes' House is a snapshot of domestic life for a family of four in a late 1920s three-bedroom Canberra house, however it is not entirely representative, given the larger than average house and garden, and there have been some minor changes and additions over time. There is an air raid shelter behind the house which is still preserved, and was built in response to the risk of bombing of Canberra during the war.

It was added to the Australian Capital Territory Heritage Register on 27 September 1996 and to the former Register of the National Estate on 25 March 1986.
