= Tuggeranong Arts Centre =

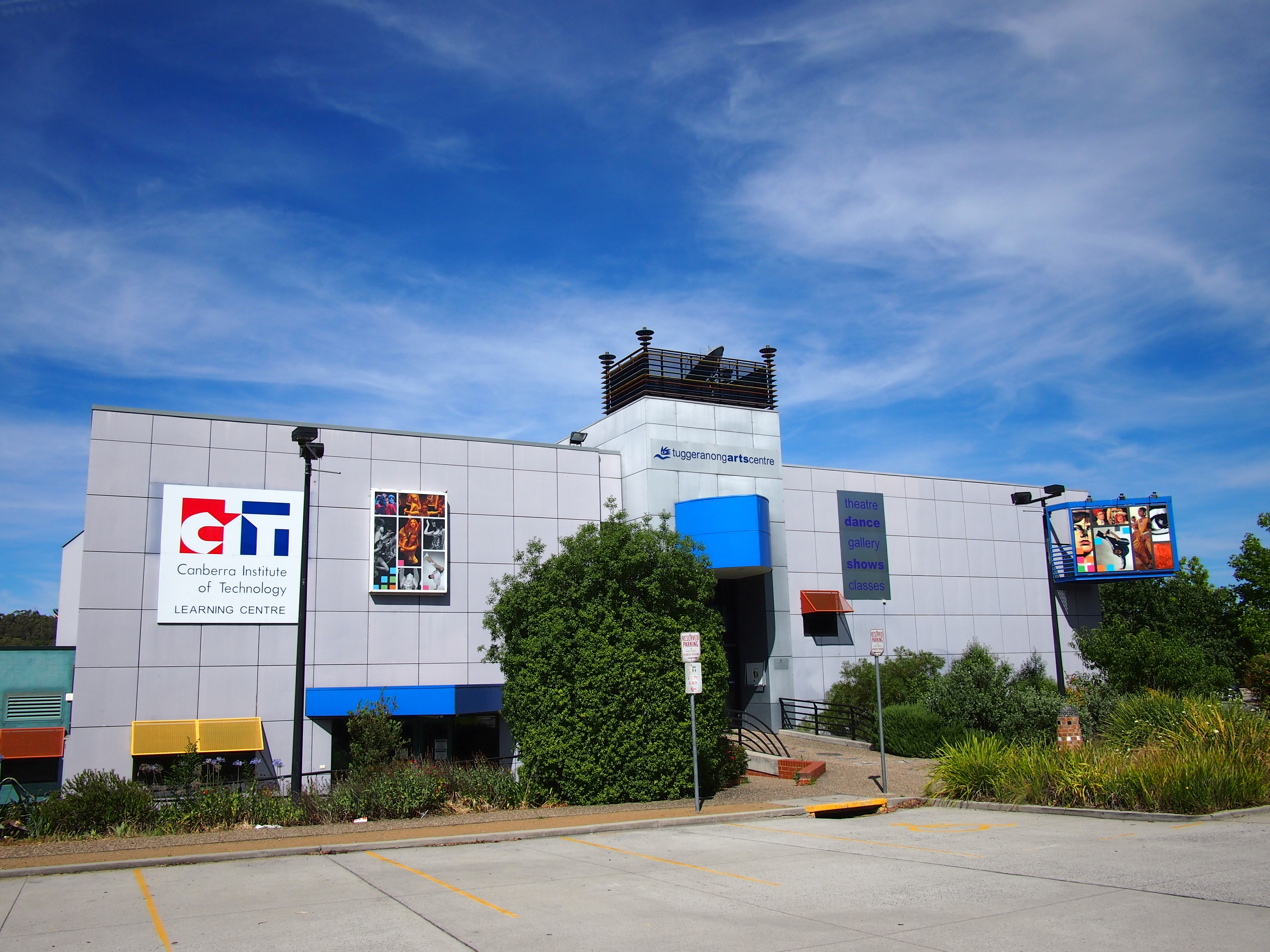
Tuggeranong Arts Centre in 2012

Tuggeranong Arts Centre is a purpose-built centre located on the shores of Lake Tuggeranong, in the town centre of Tuggeranong, a southern district of Canberra, Australian Capital Territory. It is an organisation providing a wide range of arts activities for community participation, development and enjoyment. The building features a 110-seat theatre/cinema, 2 galleries, 2 dance studios, a workshop space, and a digital media studio.

Tuggeranong Arts Centre is managed by Tuggeranong Community Arts Association Inc. and presents a diverse program of theatre, film, exhibitions, music, and dance to the public, combining community and professional arts. A number of artists and community arts organisations hire the centre's venues, including Canberra Dramatics, Free Rain Theatre, and Pied Piper Productions.
