= Lanyon Homestead =

Historic house museum in the Australian Capital Territory

Coordinates: 35°30′34″S 149°4′8″E

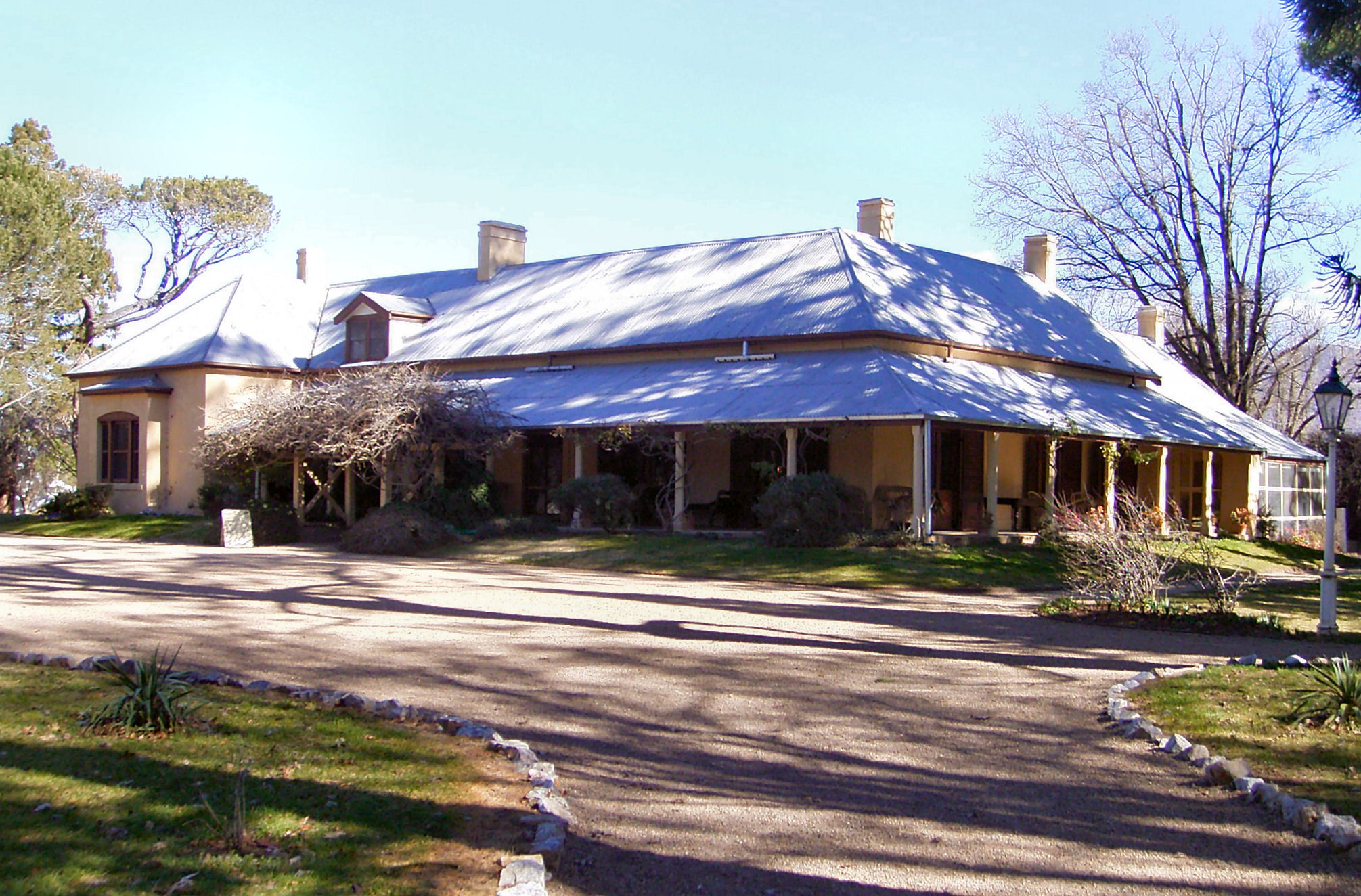
Lanyon homestead

Lanyon is an historic homestead and property located on the southern outskirts of Canberra in the Australian Capital Territory.

== History ==
The site was first occupied following white settlement by Timothy Beard, who depastured cattle on the Limestone Plains as early as 1829. Beard had been transported to Australia for life and arrived in the colony in 1806. After receiving his pardon he entered the pastoral industry as a squatter. Beard's huts were located on the Molonglo River near Queanbeyan and on the site of Lanyon homestead. Beard was forced out of the area by land grants and later became an innkeeper at Bringelly (Moore, 1982).

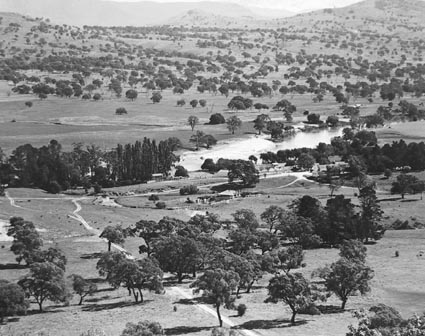
Aerial view of Lanyon station in 1950

=== The Wright family ===
James Wright and his friend John Hamilton Mortimer Lanyon settled at Lanyon in 1833 as squatters after arriving from London earlier that year. (James also took his wife and his 5 children with him.) In 1835 they purchased several adjoining blocks on the Murrumbidgee River, then the edge of legal occupation within the nineteen counties. Wright and Lanyon established an orchard, vegetable gardens, planted wheat and purchased cattle and sheep and set up a dairy herd. Fifteen convicts were assigned to Wright and Lanyon by 1835, increasing to thirty by 1837. Wright's elder brother William arrived in 1836 and purchased adjoining land. William died in 1837 following a shooting accident. Lanyon returned to England and died in 1841. Wright married Mary Davis in 1838 and the first three of their eight children were born at Lanyon. Wright encountered financial difficulties and was forced to sell Lanyon in 1841 and move to nearby Cuppacumbalong station. The Wrights had established a self-supporting community at Lanyon of up to 60 people. The design of Wright's courtyard buildings is said to be reminiscent of his native Derbyshire (ACT Government, 1994).

=== The Cunningham family ===
Lanyon was next purchased by Andrew Cunningham, a banker from Fyfeshire in Scotland. Cunningham arrived in Sydney with his family in 1845 and settled at Congwarra, north west of Lanyon. The Cunninghams built the present Lanyon homestead from local fieldstone in 1859. Lanyon was carrying 25,000 sheep by the time of Andrew Cunningham's death in 1887 and the Cunninghams had acquired five properties. Cunningham's sons James and Andrew Jackson Cunningham operated the properties in partnership, with James at Tuggeranong and Andrew at Lanyon. In 1905 Andrew Jackson married Louisa Leman and extended and redecorated the homestead. Andrew died in 1913 and Louisa sold the contents of the homestead and returned to Sydney. James Cunningham moved his family from Tuggeranong to Lanyon in 1915.

=== The Field family ===
After James' death in 1921 his son Andy oversaw Lanyon until 1926 when the property was sold to Harry Osborne of Currandooley, near Bungendore. The Osbornes sold the property in 1930 to Thomas Field who had large landholdings in New South Wales and Queensland. The Field family lived in Sydney but visited Lanyon often. They implemented major changes, including modern farming methods, large scale pasture improvement and irrigation of lucerne.

By the late 1960s, the growth of the National Capital had necessitated the resumption of large tracts of farmland south of Canberra. Up to a dozen rural leases, in parts of South Woden and Weston Creek, were resumed to make way for development of Tuggeranong, the second of Canberra's urban satellites Lanyon, was the largest single parcel of freehold land in the ACT. Tom Field lodged plans to sub-divide some of his 9,000 acres (36 km^{2}). When the Federal Government proceeded to acquire Lanyon, Field refused an offer of $1.875m and sought compensation of $33m, the amount a private valuer had placed on the land when assessed at urban values.

The matter of Field versus the Commonwealth of Australia eventually proceeded to Australia’s High Court. The government defended the level of compensation it had offered Mr Field, concerned too that if successful, the ‘Field Case’ would set a dangerous precedent for compensation on freehold land throughout Australia. The Federal Government acquired Lanyon for $3.7m in 1974. In the early to mid-1970s the McMahon and Whitlam Governments withdrew the rural leases for Lanyon, Cuppacumbalong Homestead and Gold Creek Homestead.

== Lanyon today ==
The government converted the homestead into the Sidney Nolan Gallery which opened to the public in 1975. It housed a collection of the paintings of Sir Sidney Nolan. A purpose-built gallery for the Nolan collection was built in the grounds in 1980. An extensive conservation and restoration program was undertaken and the homestead is now managed as a house museum, within a working property, by the ACT Government and the National Trust of Australia (ACT).

Lanyon Homestead was threatened by the 2003 Canberra bushfires, which also threatened the nearby township of Tharwa. On 18 January 2003, as fires were approaching Canberra, the homestead was hosting a wedding. The fire situation deteriorated, prompting the evacuation of Tharwa, which was defended and saved by Southern Rural Fire Brigades. The Lanyon Homestead was not impacted by fire, though it did come under ember attack. A single fire truck was on hand to hose down and protect the historic homestead. Given the age of Lanyon, this was certainly not the first time the property had faced bushfires.
