= Tuggeranong Town Centre =

Coordinates: 35.417°S 149.066°E

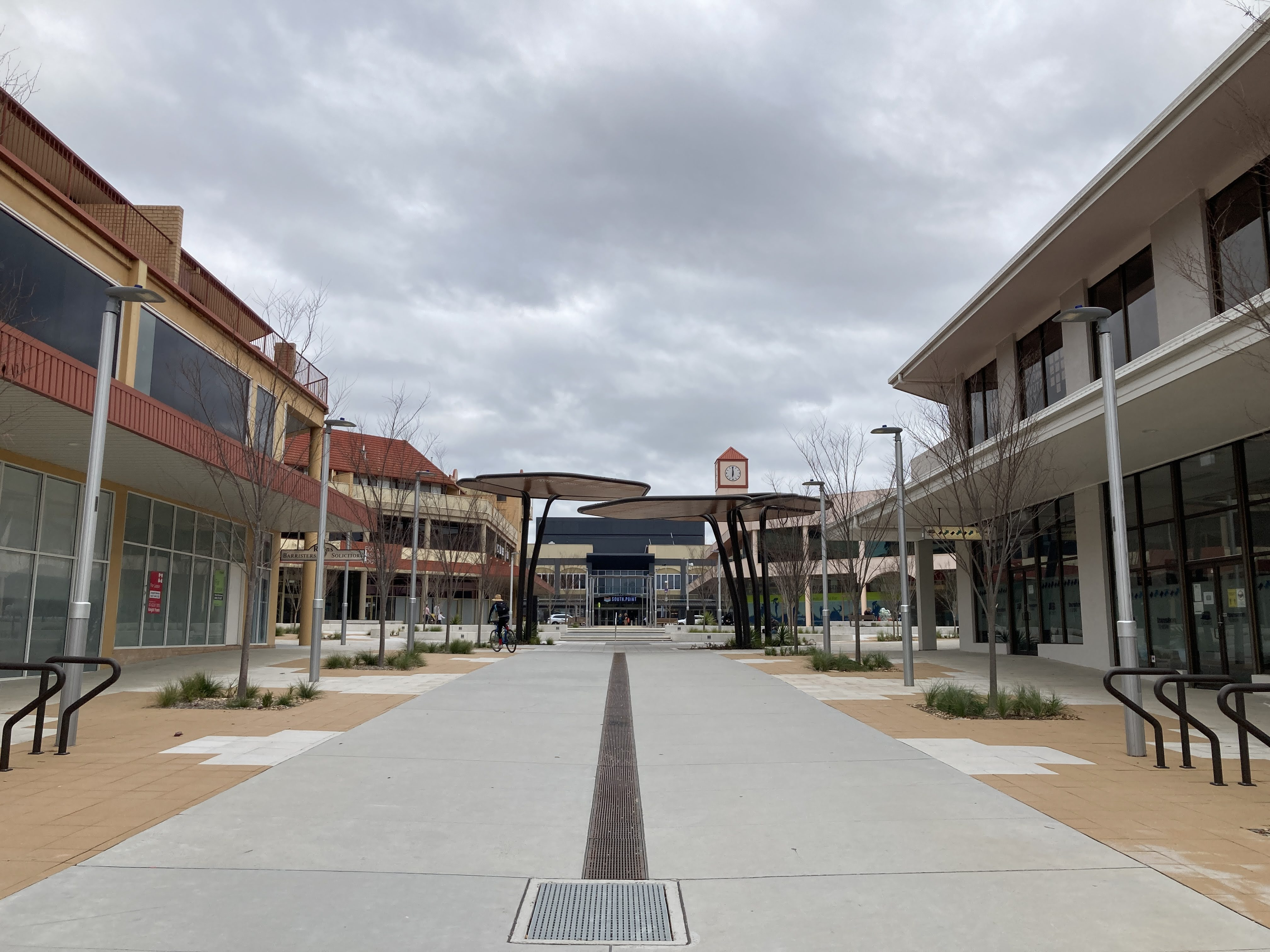
- Walkway through Tuggeranong Town Centre
- Country: Australia
- State: Australian Capital Territory
- City: Tuggeranong
- District: Tuggeranong

Government
  - Territory electorate: Brindabella
  - Federal division: Bean

Tuggeranong Town Centre is the town centre of the district of Tuggeranong in the Australian Capital Territory. It is located on the south-western side of Lake Tuggeranong and composed of a large two-storey mall called South.Point Tuggeranong, as well as smaller shopping complexes, the Homeworld, and Tuggeranong Shopping Square, and many other buildings and shops. It is also the location of the Tuggeranong Interchange, a youth centre, a bowling alley, Tuggeranong Skate Park, the Tuggeranong Arts Centre and Lake Tuggeranong College. Much of its architecture is noticeably Postmodern, infused with classical features such as prominent red roofs and a clock tower, as well as distinctive features such as one large round window each on most sides of the library.

== History ==
In the 1970s the National Capital Development Commission recommended that the service trades area of the Tuggeranong Town Centre and Mitchell be given priority over Jerrabomberra and West Belconnen. Preliminary work on the Tuggeranong Town Centre was done by architect Dirk Bolt.

The draft plan for the Tuggeranong Town Centre stated it should "have good vehicular access and address with routes being direct, unobstructed and easily understood", and "parking areas should be easy to find and allow for easy movement to and from the main functional areas of the centre". It was deemed car parking "supply should not be limited in an attempt to enforce increased public transport usage".

In 1974 Harry Seidler proposed an office complex called "Tuggeranong 2". The unbuilt project was planned for the western side of the planned town centre. The model photography for the proposal was by Max Dupain. Collin Griffiths (who worked for Seidler) considered this building "a significant opening shot" in the evolution of Harry Seidler's architectural style from "masculine linear to an equally disciplined curvilinear planning approach", also noting this evolution in his 1963 Rocks scheme reminiscent of Le Corbusier's Algiers plan for 'Obus' for Algiers in 1932. A colour photo of this scheme and a "central heating and cooling station" (or "District Energy station") was also published.

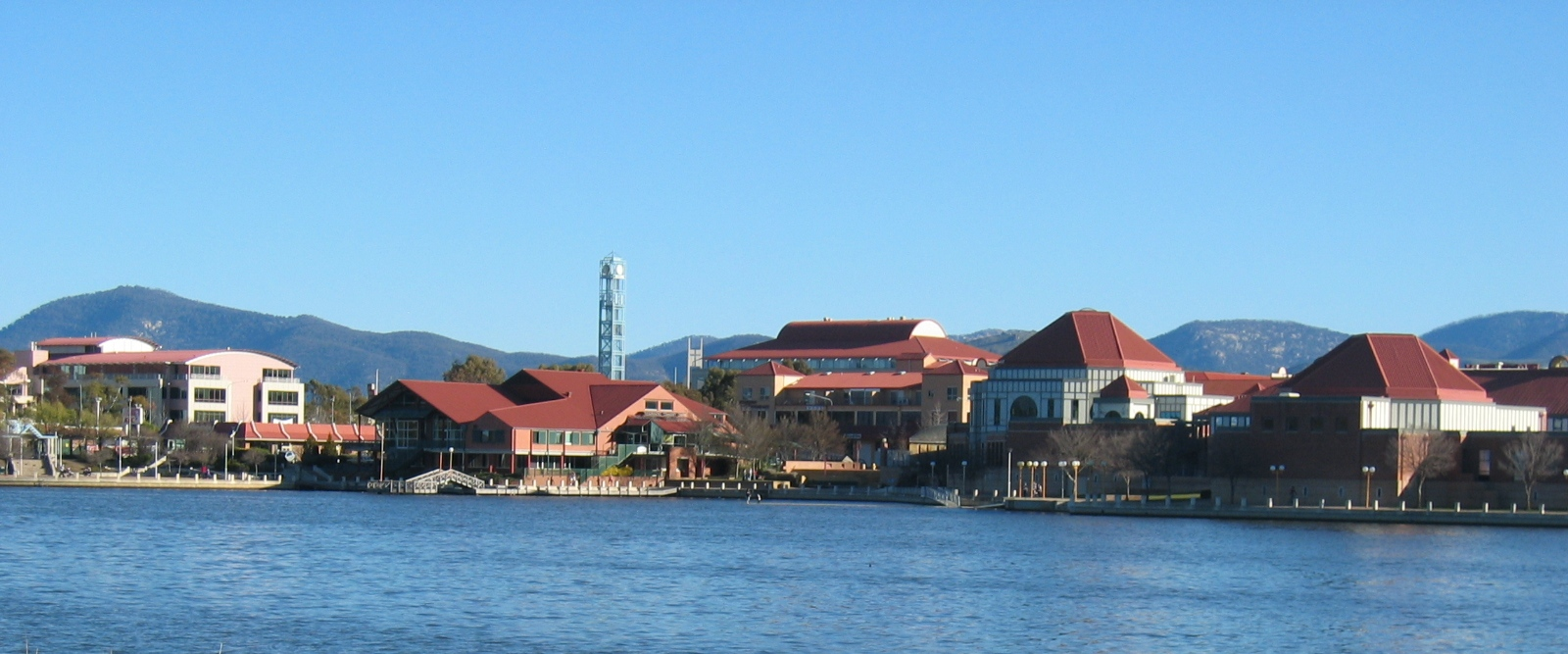
The Tuggeranong Town Centre is located on Lake Tuggeranong and has Postmodern architecture.

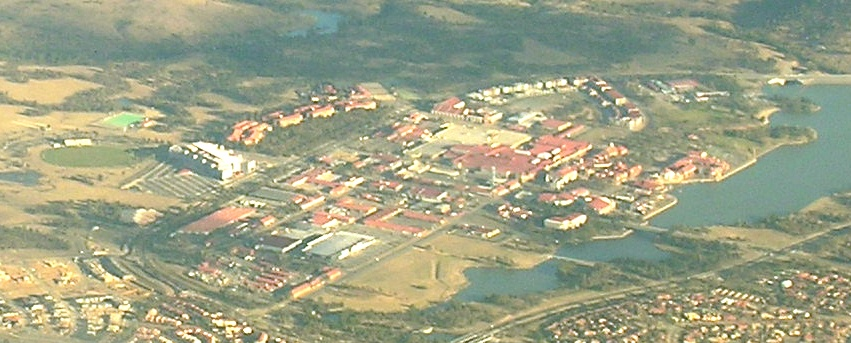
Aerial photo from the southeast
