= McKillop =

McKillop, MacKillop, Mackillop may refer to:

People

- McKillop (surname), the surnames McKillop, MacKillop, and Mackillop

Places

- Electoral district of MacKillop
- Huron East, Ontario (redirect from McKillop Township)
- Rural Municipality of McKillop No. 220, Saskatchewan
- McKillop, Ontario
- McKillop Street, Melbourne

Schools

- Clairvaux Mackillop College
- MacKillop Catholic College, Canberra
- MacKillop Catholic Regional College, Werribee
- MacKillop College (disambiguation)
- MacKillop College, Bathurst
- MacKillop College, Mornington
- MacKillop College, Swan Hill
- Mary MacKillop Catholic Regional College, South Gippsland
- Mary MacKillop College, Kensington
- Mary MacKillop College, Wakeley
- Mary MacKillop Interpretive Centre
- St Mary MacKillop College, Albury
- St Mary MacKillop College, Canberra
