= Mary MacKillop (disambiguation) =

Mary MacKillop is Australia's first and only Roman Catholic Saint.

Mary MacKillop may also refer to:

- Mary MacKillop College (disambiguation)
  - Mary MacKillop College, Kensington, Adelaide, South Australia
  - Mary MacKillop College, Wakeley, Sydney, New South Wales
  - Mary MacKillop Catholic Regional College, Leongatha, Victoria
  - St Mary MacKillop College, Albury
  - St Mary MacKillop College, Canberra
- Mary MacKillop Interpretive Centre, Penola, South Australia
- Mary Mackillop Memorial Chapel and Museum, North Sydney, New South Wales

== See also ==
- MacKillop College (disambiguation)
- Electoral district of MacKillop
