= MacKillop College =

MacKillop College may refer to several Catholic schools in Australia named in honour of Mary MacKillop:

- Clairvaux MacKillop College, formally MacKillop College and Clairvaux College, Upper Mount Gravatt, Queensland
- MacKillop College, Bathurst, New South Wales
- MacKillop Catholic College, Palmerston, Northern Territory
- MacKillop College, Mornington, Tasmania
- MacKillop College, Swan Hill, Victoria
- Mary MacKillop College, Wakeley, New South Wales
- Mary MacKillop College, Kensington, South Australia
- Mary MacKillop Catholic Regional College, Leongatha, Victoria
- MacKillop Catholic Regional College, Werribee, Victoria
- Mary MacKillop Catholic Regional College, South Gippsland, Victoria
- Penola Catholic College, Victoria
- St Mary MacKillop College, Albury, New South Wales
- St Mary MacKillop College, Canberra, Australian Capital Territory
- St Mary MacKillop College, Swan Hill, Victoria

== See also ==
- McKillop (disambiguation)
- Mary MacKillop (disambiguation)
