= Stranger Pond =

Artificial reservoir in Canberra, Australia

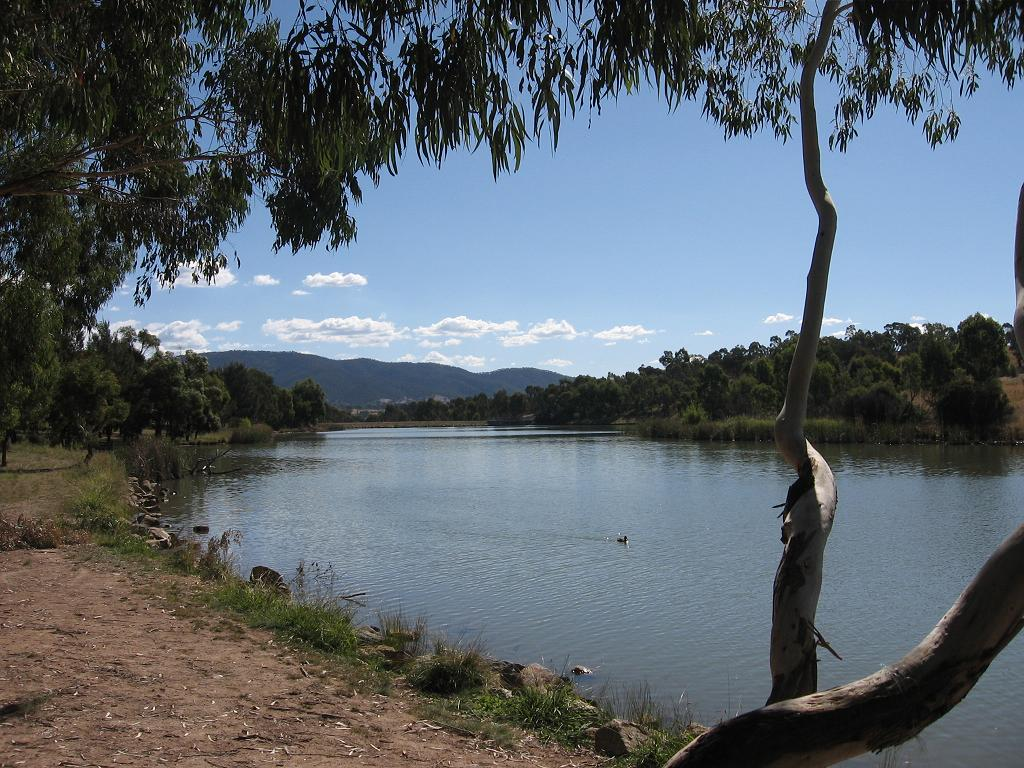
- Looking northwest over (Lower) Stranger Pond, 2007

- Location of the lower pond in the ACT
- Interactive map of Stranger Pond
- Location: Bonython and Isabella Plains, Australian Capital Territory
- Coordinates: 35°25′47″S 149°4′11″E
- Type: Artificial lakes
- Primary inflows: Urban and rural stormwater
- River sources: Murrumbidgee River, in times of flood only
- Catchment area: 3.57 km^{2} (880 acres)
- Built: 1989
- Surface area: 8.5 ha (21 acres): 4.4 ha (11 acres) (Upper); 4 ha (9.9 acres) (Lower)
- Surface elevation: 576 m (1,890 ft) AHD

The Stranger Pond is a series of two artificial lakes sourced from stormwater discharge from urban and rural areas, that are both located in the Tuggeranong district of Canberra, within the Australian Capital Territory, Australia. The Upper Stranger Pond is located in the suburb of Isabella Plains. The Lower Stranger Pond is located in the suburb of Bonython. (Note: Lower Stranger Pond is widely known simply as 'Stranger Pond'. Google Maps only labels one of the two ponds – that being the one in Bonython and calls it 'Stranger Pond.') The two ponds are connected by a pipe that is normally closed, located under Drakeford Drive.

== Features ==
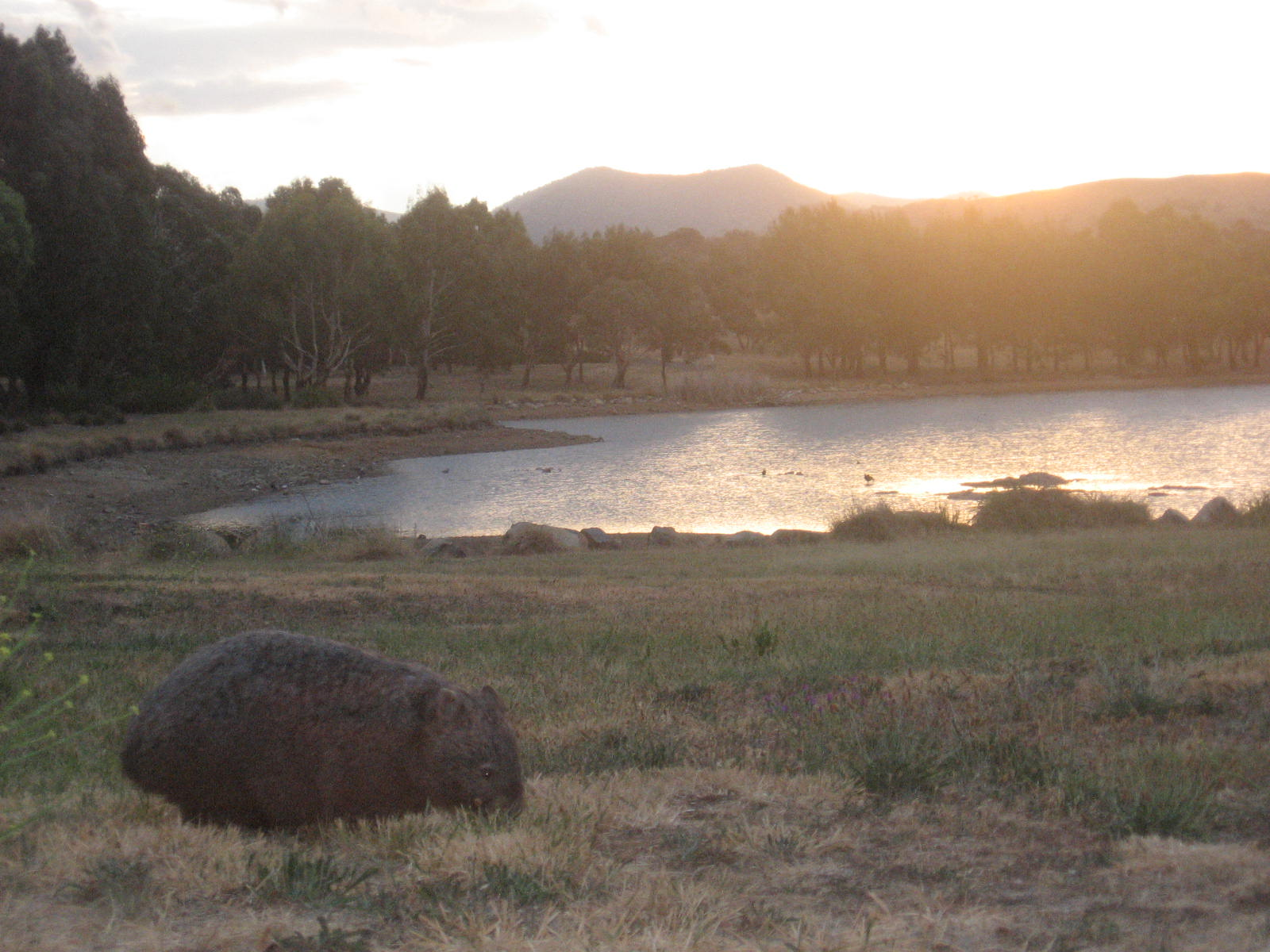
A wombat enjoying the sunset, Stranger Pond, 2007

Stranger Pond was created by the construction of a dam in 1989 across a natural drainage channel, coinciding with urban development in the district. The ponds were built as sediment traps for soil and debris, and to improve the quality of the water flowing into the Murrumbidgee River. Upper Stranger Pond comprises a surface area of 4.4 hectares (11 acres), while Lower Stranger Pond comprises a surface area of 4.1 hectares (10 acres).

Native wildlife, such as pelicans, swans, kangaroos, and wombats, can be found in and around Stranger Pond. In the pond, European carp and redfin can be caught; carp have been recorded up to 8 kilograms (18 lb) and can be caught on corn; redfin can be caught on celtas and small softplastics, as well as flies.

In 2017, the Upper Stranger Pond was drained as part of a project to reduce the impact of European carp on native fish species. In 2018, the pond was restocked with Murray cod and golden perch.

== See also ==
- List of dams and reservoirs in the Australian Capital Territory
- Lake Tuggeranong
- Tuggeranong Creek
