= Tuggeranong Creek =

Coordinates: 35°25′37″S 149°6′23″E

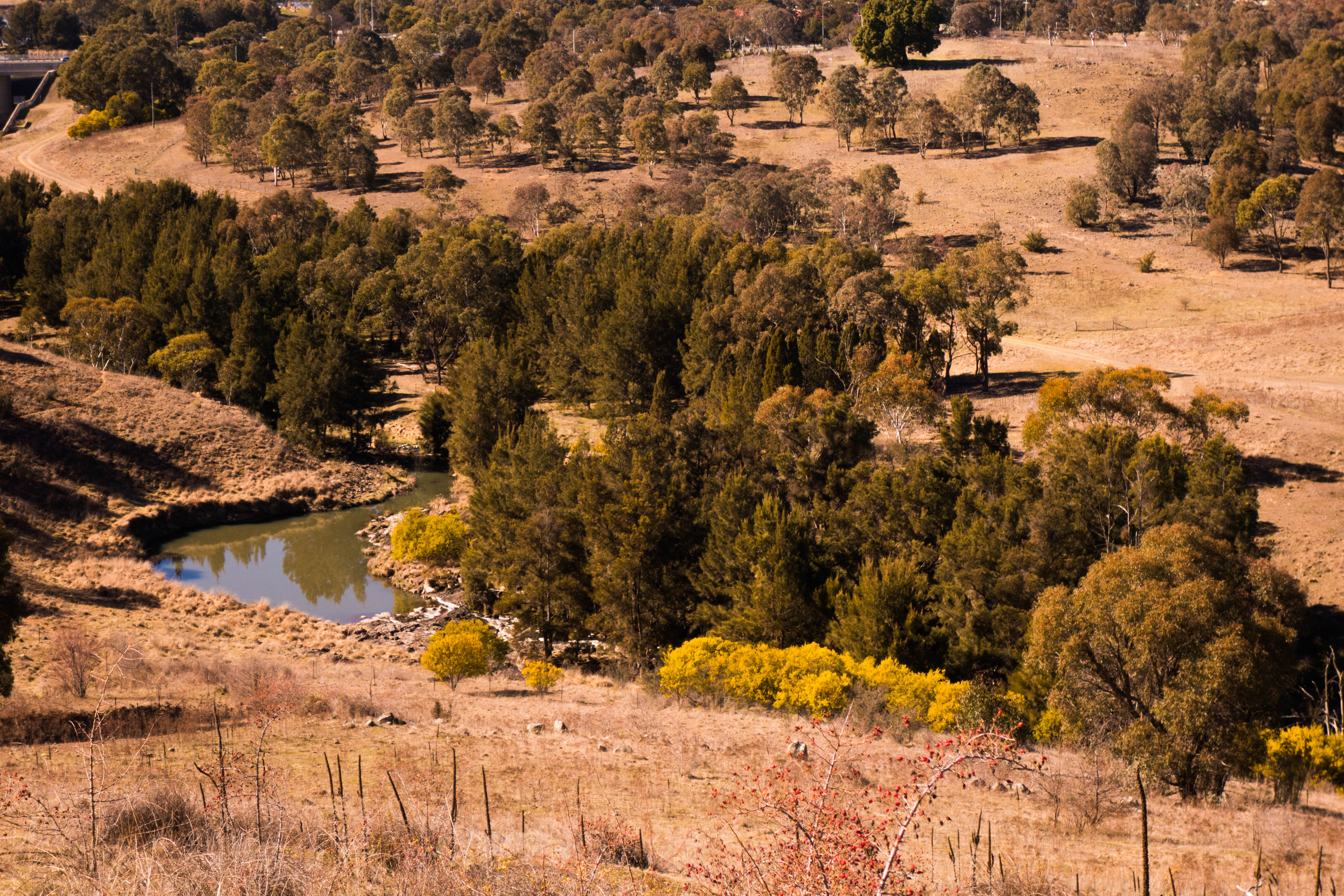
- Spring on Tuggeranong Creek
- Etymology: Aboriginal: word meaning "cold plain"

Location
- Country: Australia
- Territory: Australian Capital Territory
- IBRA: South Eastern Highlands
- District: Tuggeranong
- Town centre: Tuggeranong

Physical characteristics
- Source: Tuggeranong Hill
  - location: east of Theodore
  - elevation: 700 m (2,300 ft)(approx.)
- Mouth: Confluence with Murrumbidgee River
  - location: South of Greenway
  - elevation: 570 m (1,870 ft)(approx.)

Basin features
- River system: Murrumbidgee River, Murray–Darling basin
- Tributaries
  - right: Dunns Creek
- Reservoirs: Isabella Pond, Lake Tuggeranong

Tuggeranong Creek, a partly perennial stream of the Murrumbidgee catchment within the Murray–Darling basin, is located in the Tuggeranong district of Canberra, within the Australian Capital Territory, Australia.

Tuggeranong is derived from the Aboriginal word, meaning "cold plain". The traditional custodians of the land surrounding Tuggeranong Creek are the Aboriginal people of the Ngunnawal tribe.

== Course ==
Tuggeranong Creek rises below Tuggeranong Hill, east of the suburb of Theodore and the Monaro Highway, formed through rural runoff within Monks Pond. The creek flows generally west and north-west, through Theodore, past the playing fields located in Calwell, through Richardson where it passes close to Tuggeranong Homestead, and through Isabella Plains, gathering urban stormwater drainage. Tuggeranong Creek is impounded at Bonython to form Isabella Pond, which is also impounded to form Lake Tuggeranong, a 57.1 hectares (141 acres) man-made artificial lake.

The creek is dammed at Tuggeranong Town Centre along Athlon Drive. Although there is no clear channel, Tuggeranong Creek flows south-west to form confluence with the Murrumbidgee River, south of Greenway.
