= Lake Tuggeranong =

Dam and reservoir in Canberra, Australia

Tuggeranong Dam
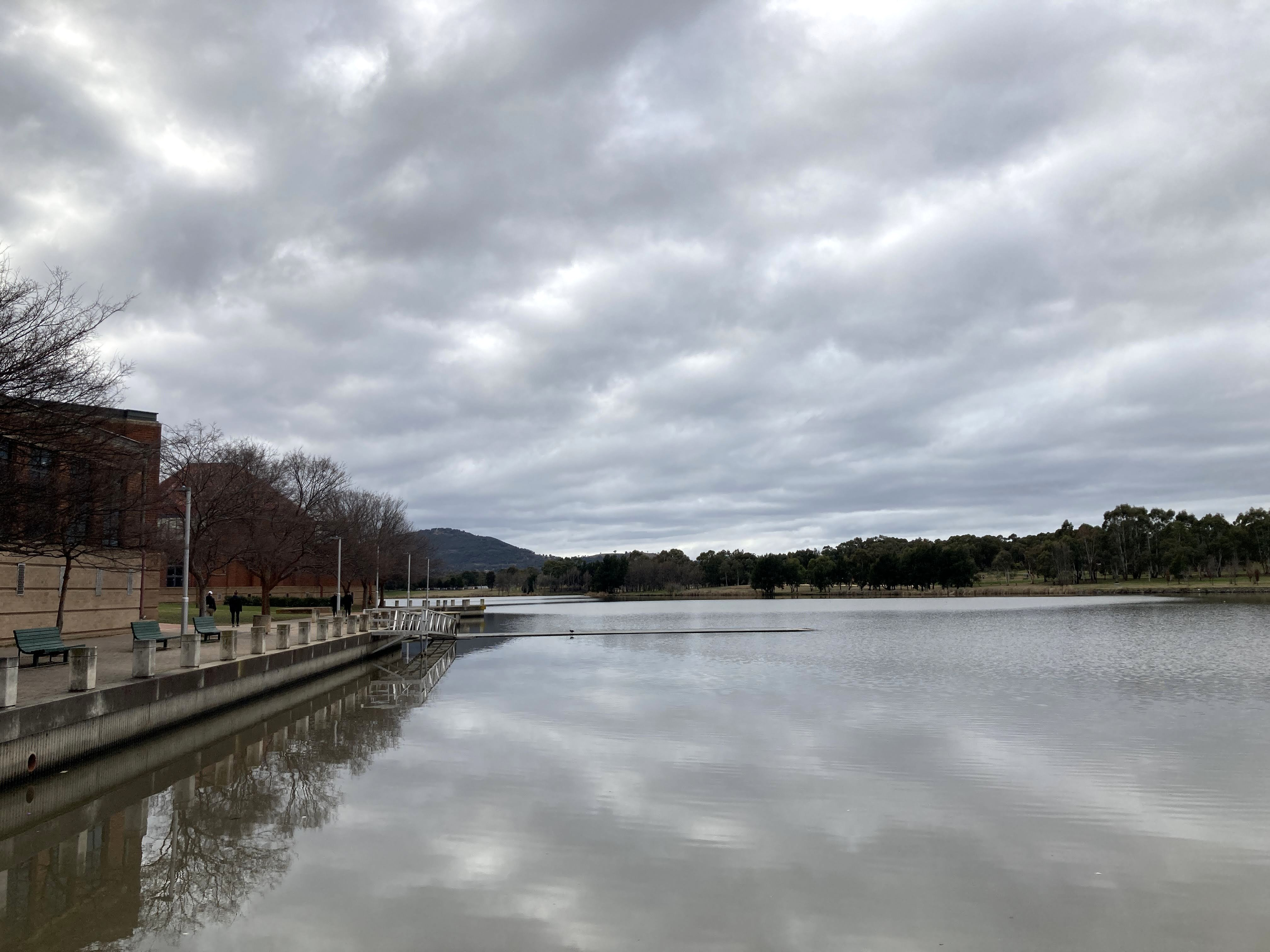
- Reflection on the lake in August 2021

- Location of the dam and lake in the ACT
- Interactive map of Tuggeranong Dam
- Country: Australia
- Location: Tuggeranong, Canberra, Australian Capital Territory
- Coordinates: 35°24′29″S 149°03′49″E
- Purpose: Recreation; artificial lake
- Status: Operational
- Opening date: 1988
- Built by: Leighton Contractors

Dam and spillways
- Type of dam: Earth fill dam
- Impounds: Tuggeranong Creek
- Height (foundation): 20 m (66 ft)
- Length: 640 m (2,100 ft)
- Dam volume: 313×10^{3} m^{3} (11.1×10^{6} cu ft)
- Spillway type: Uncontrolled
- Spillway capacity: 990 m^{3}/s (35,000 cu ft/s)

Reservoir
- Creates: Lake Tuggeranong
- Total capacity: 1,800 ML (1,500 acre⋅ft)
- Surface area: 60 ha (150 acres)
- Normal elevation: 572 m (1,877 ft) AHD

Lake Tuggeranong is a reservoir formed by the Tuggeranong Dam, an earth-fill embankment dam across the Tuggeranong Creek, in the Tuggeranong district of Canberra, within the Australian Capital Territory, Australia. The artificial lake is situated adjacent to the Tuggeranong Town Centre, and is bounded by the suburbs of Bonython in the south-east and Kambah in the north-west.

== Overview ==
Lake Tuggeranong was created by the construction of a dam in 1987 coinciding with urban development in the district. In addition to Tuggeranong Creek, the reservoir is sourced by stormwater discharge from urban and rural areas and was built as a sediment trap for soil and debris, and to improve the quality of the water flowing into the Murrumbidgee River.

Completed in 1988 by Leighton Contrcators, the earth-filled dam wall is 20 metres (66 ft) high and 640 metres (2,100 ft) long. The impounded reservoir, Lake Tuggeranong, has a maximum capacity of 1,800 megalitres (1,500 acre⋅ft) when full and covers an area of 60 hectares (150 acres). The uncontrolled spillway has the flow capacity of 990 cubic metres per second (35,000 cu ft/s). The Isabella Pond is located upstream of the dam wall.

The water quality of Lake Tuggeranong is monitored by health and environmental agencies, and is subject to health hazards such as toxic blue-green algal blooms or high faecal bacteria counts, given the urban and rural runoff of the lake source.

The lake is a popular recreational site. The foreshore of the lake is parkland, with swimming, fishing, wind-surfing and non-motorised boating all possible activities on the lake. A bicycle path surrounds the lake, running for 6.7 kilometres (4.2 mi).

== See also ==
- List of dams and reservoirs in the Australian Capital Territory
- Stranger Pond
