= Athletics at the 2010 South American Games – Women's 1500 metres =

The Women's 1,500m event at the 2010 South American Games was held on March 23 at 18:40.

== Medalists ==
Gold	Silver	Bronze
Evangelina Thomas; Argentina	Rocío Huillca (Peru) Perú	Jenifer Silva; Brazil

== Records ==
Standing records prior to the 2010 South American Games
World record	Yunxia Qu	China	3:50.46	Beijing, China	11 September 1993
World Leading	Kaila McKnight	Australia	4:13.97	Newcastle, Australia	6 February 2010
South American record	Letitia Vriesde	Suriname	4:05.67	Tokyo, Japan	31 August 1991
South American U23 record	Yessica Quispe	(Peru) Perú	4:13.53	Lima, Peru	16 October 2004

== Results ==
Results were published.

Rank	Athlete	Nationality	Result	Notes
1st place, gold medalist(s)	Evangelina Thomas	Argentina	4:38.07	
2nd place, silver medalist(s)	Rocío Huillca	(Peru) Perú	4:40.39	
3rd place, bronze medalist(s)	Jenifer Silva	Brazil	4:40.90	
4	Charo Inga	(Peru) Perú	4:46.20	
5	Dina Cid	Chile	4:47.90	
6	Geisiane de Lima	Brazil	4:48.82	
7	Wendy Guavita	Colombia	5:02.43	
8	Vanessa Philbert	Netherlands Antilles	5:08.57	^{†}

^{†}: Not eligible for the South American Under-23 Championships.

Intermediate times:

400m	1:16.13	Geisiane de Lima (BRA)
800m	2:37.09	Jenifer Silva (BRA)
1200m	3:49.44	Jenifer Silva (BRA)

== See also ==
- 2010 South American Under-23 Championships in Athletics
