= Wanniassa =

- Suburb
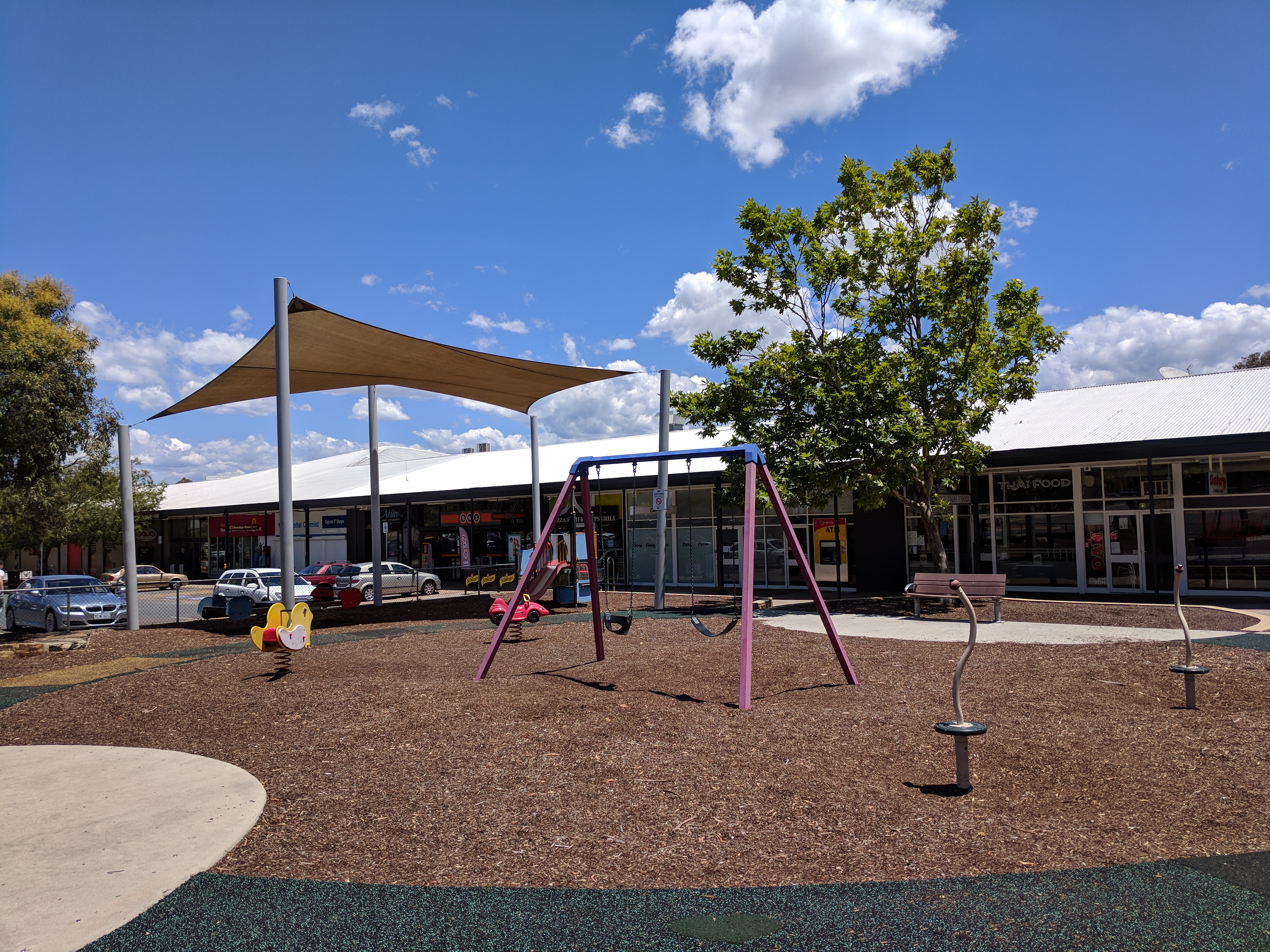
- Wanniassa Shops

- Coordinates: 35°24′11″S 149°05′50″E
- Country: Australia
- State: Australian Capital Territory
- City: Canberra
- District: Tuggeranong
- Established: 1975

Government
  - Territory electorate: Brindabella
  - Federal division: Bean

Area
  - Total: 5.4 km^{2} (2.1 sq mi)

Population
  - Total: 7,885 (2021 census)
  - Density: 1,460/km^{2} (3,780/sq mi)
- Postcode: 2903
- Gazetted: 21 May 1974
Suburbs around Wanniassa
Kambah	Farrer	Nature reserve
Greenway	Wanniassa	Fadden
Oxley	Monash	Gowrie

Wanniassa (/ˈwɒnɪæsə/) is a suburb in the Tuggeranong district of Canberra, Australian Capital Territory (ACT). The suburb takes its name from a pastoral property granted to Thomas McQuoid in 1835, which he named after Wanayasa in Purwakarta Regency, West Java, Indonesia, where McQuoid had previously owned property. Streets are named after Victorian state politicians and the suburb was gazetted on 21 May 1974.

It is next to the suburbs of Kambah, Greenway, Oxley, Monash, Gowrie and Fadden. It is bounded by Athllon Drive, Sulwood Drive, Erindale Drive and Taverner Street.

== Demographics ==
At the 2021 census, Wanniassa had a population of 7,885. The median age of people in Wanniassa was 39 years, compared to a median age of 35 for Canberra. The median individual income for Wanniassa in 2021 was $1,127, below the Canberra average of $1,203, while the median household income was $2,295.

The residents of Wanniassa are predominantly Australian born, with 74.8% being born in Australia. The three main countries of birth for those born overseas were India, 3.2%, England, 3.1% and New Zealand, 1.1%. The most popular religious affiliations in descending order are no religion, Catholic and Anglican.

== Suburb amenities ==
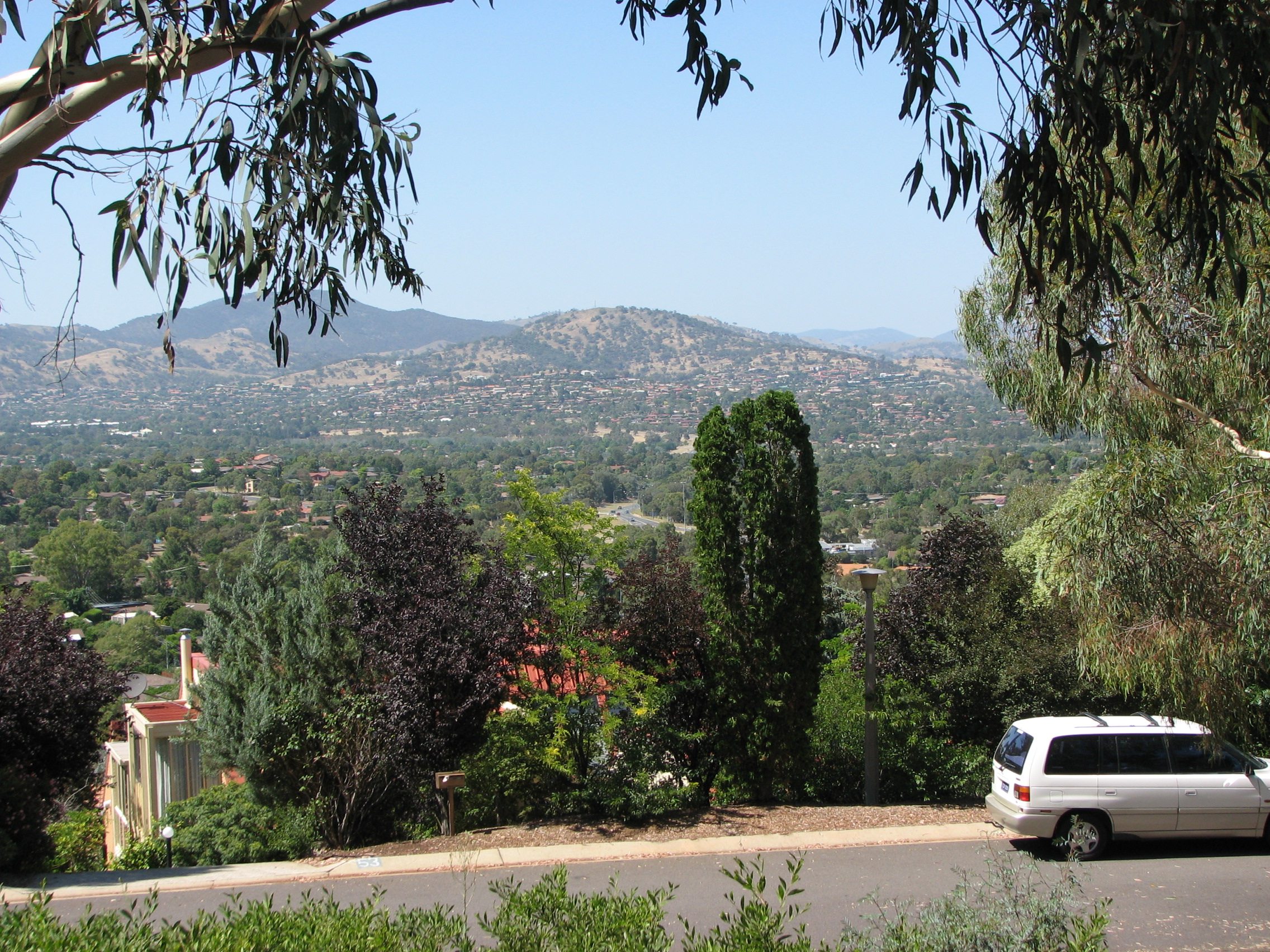
View across Wanniassa to the Brindabellas

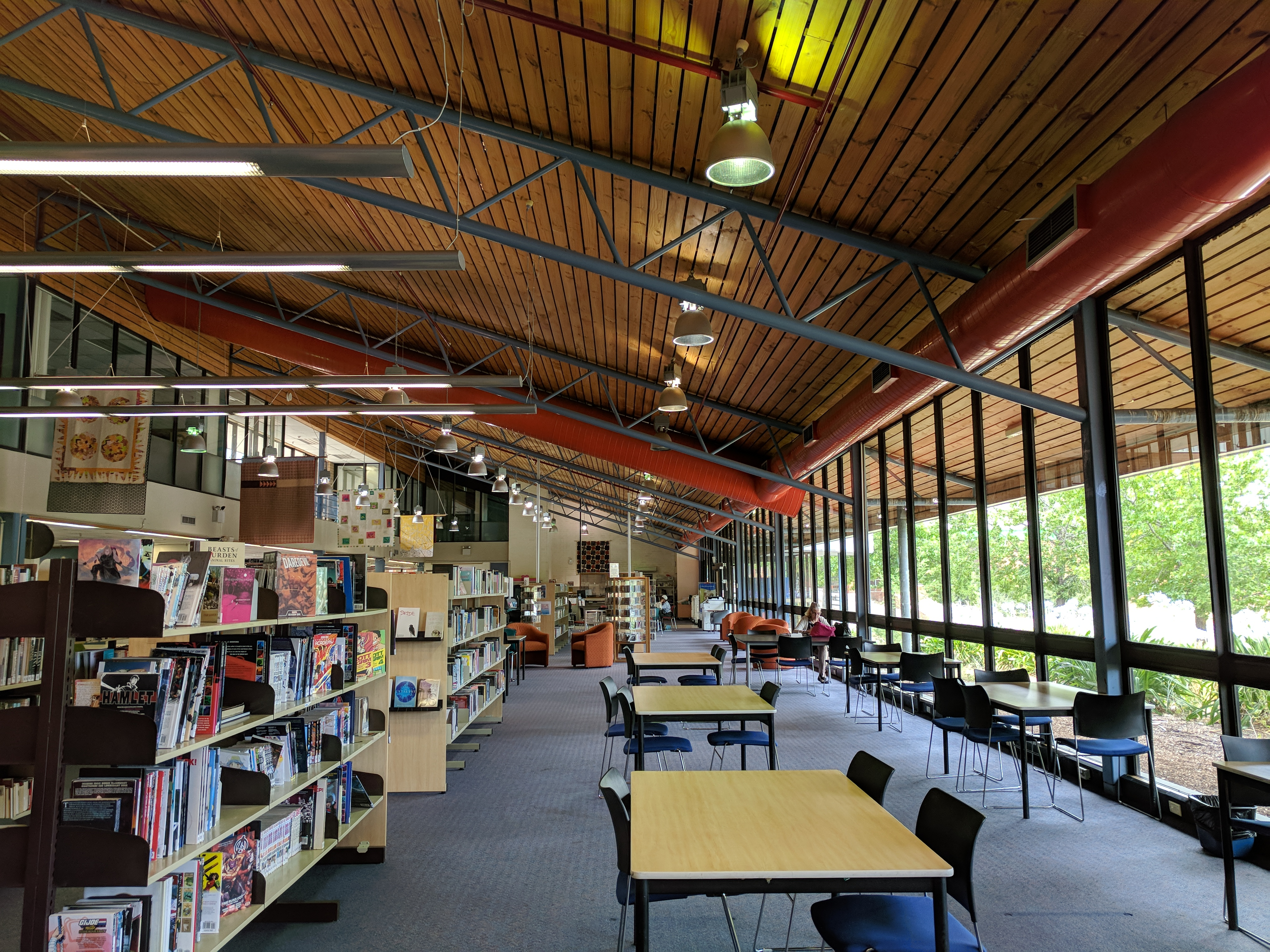
Erindale Library

A wide variety of facilities are located in Wanniassa.

=== Shops ===
The Erindale Centre is located in the south east of Wanniassa and provides a number of service and retail outlets. The Wanniassa Shops is a smaller retail centre located at the north of the suburb, housing a Coles supermarket and various other businesses including a butcher, a baker and local take-aways.

=== Sport and recreation ===
Other facilities include Erindale Vikings Club, Active Leisure Centre, the Erindale Theatre and the Erindale Library. In addition to the Active Leisure Centre, sporting facilities in Wanniassa include the Wanniassa Enclosed Oval, the Wanniassa District Playing Fields, the Erindale Playing Fields and the Erindale tennis courts.

== Education ==
Wanniassa Hills Primary School is located on Langdon Avenue; it is a public primary school servicing students from Kindergarten to Year 6. Wanniassa School is a public primary and high school with adjacent campuses serving students from Pre-School to Year 6 and Year 7 to Year 10. The junior campus of St Mary MacKillop College is located in Wanniassa, serving students from Year 7 to Year 9. Another Catholic school, St Anthony's Parish Primary School, is also located in Wanniassa and serves Kindergarten to Year 6 students. Trinity Christian School is an independent Christian school serving students from Kindergarten to Year 12.

=== Erindale College ===
Erindale College is a public college serving students in Years 11 and 12, founded in 1982. The college is integrated into and makes use of the various other facilities in Erindale. Erindale College is part of the larger Erindale Education and Recreation Complex. This gives students access to a 450-seat theatre in which productions are presented both by the college and community. The Erindale Library is open during the day and evening all year round. The facilities in the Active Leisure Centre, available for student use, include a 25-metre swimming pool and fully equipped gym. Erindale College is well known for its sporting program (talented sports program) which has produced many professional athletes such as Huia Edmonds, Brent Kite, Jason Smith, Brett Finch, Michael Weyman, David Atkins, Joel Monaghan, Royston Lightning, Allan Brookman, Michael Robertson, Nathan Smith, Andrew Price, Ben Rauter, Michael Dobson, David Palavi and Brenton Lawrence.

== Places of worship ==
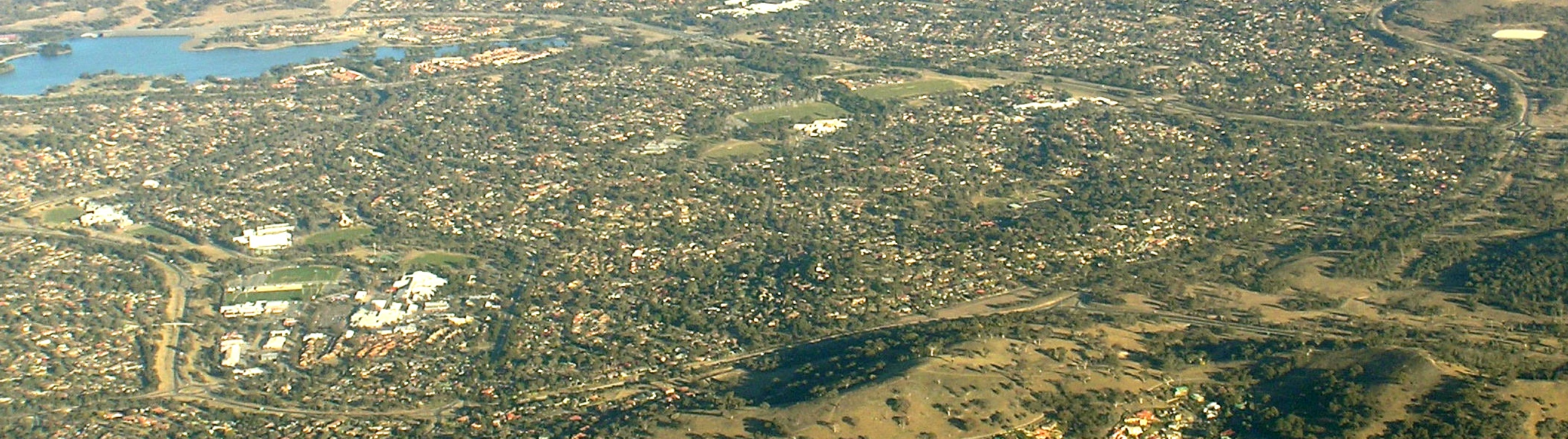
Aerial view from east

Several churches are located in Wanniassa. St Anthony of Padua Parish is a Catholic parish that was established in 1976; services were held at Wanniasa Primary School and Padua High School—later St Mary MacKillop College—before the church adjacent to St Mary MacKillop College was completed in 1987. St Matthew's Anglican Church is located adjacent to Trinity Christian School on Laurens Street. Tuggeranong Uniting Church, Capital Edge Community Church (formerly known as Erindale Christian Centre) and Lifestream Christian Fellowship are all located in or adjacent to the Erindale Centre. Christian City Church Tuggeranong offers services at the hall of Wanniassa School Senior Campus while they await the construction of a more permanent building in Monash.

== Transport ==
Wanniassa is serviced by several ACTION bus routes which all connect at Erindale Interchange. Route R5 travels through Wanniassa and links to Civic via Woden Town Centre. Routes 72, 73, 74, 75, 76 and 77 connects Wanniassa and surrounding suburbs to Tuggeranong Town Centre.

== Geological features ==
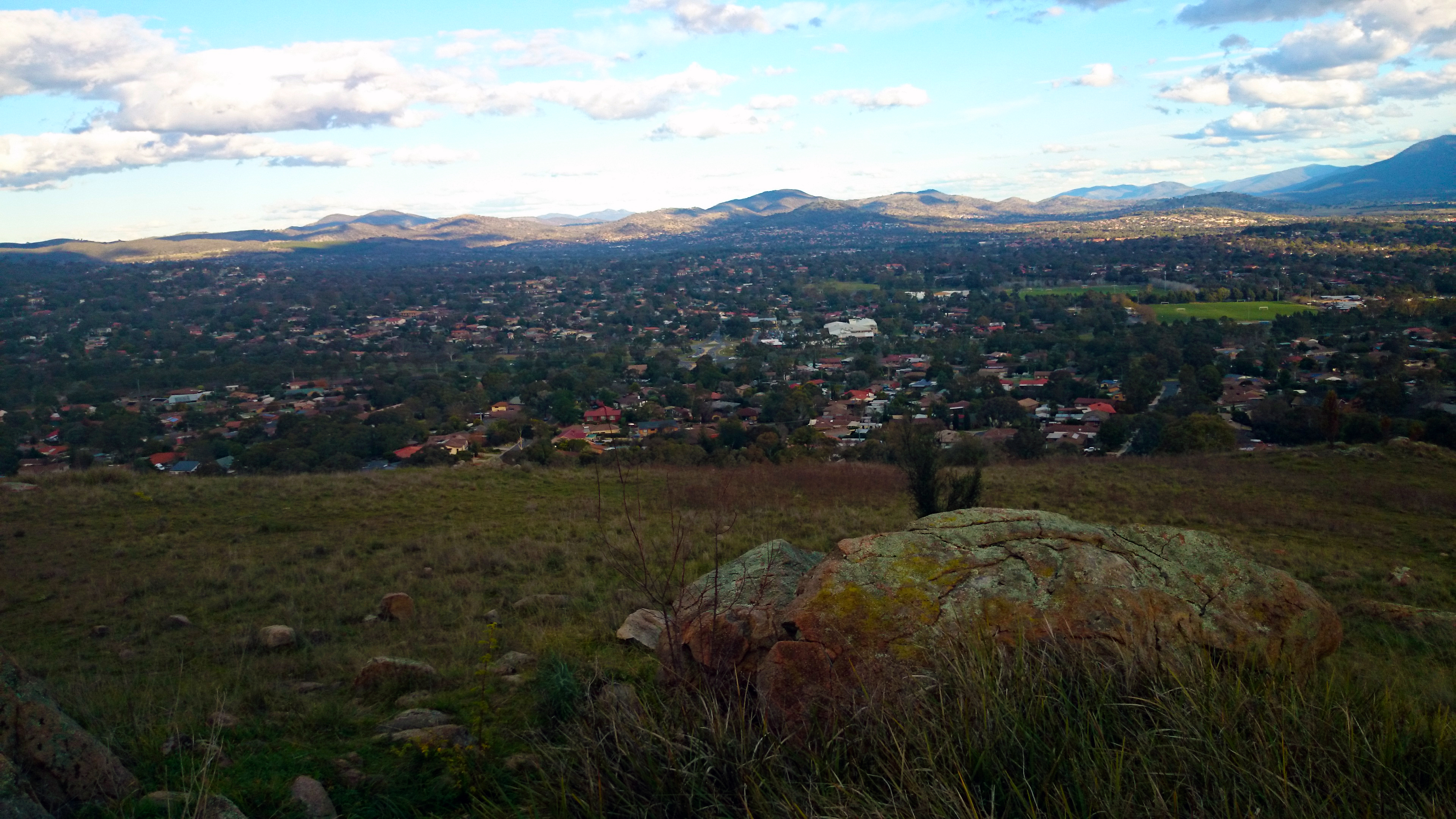
Looking south from Mt Taylor to Wanniassa overlooking Wanniassa Shops (center) and the district playing fields (right).

Wanniassa is underlain by Deakin Volcanics from the Silurian age 414 million years old – cream-green and purple rhyodacite in the eastern half, with tuff, agglomerate and rhyolite in the west.
