= Monash, Australian Capital Territory =

Monash
- Suburb
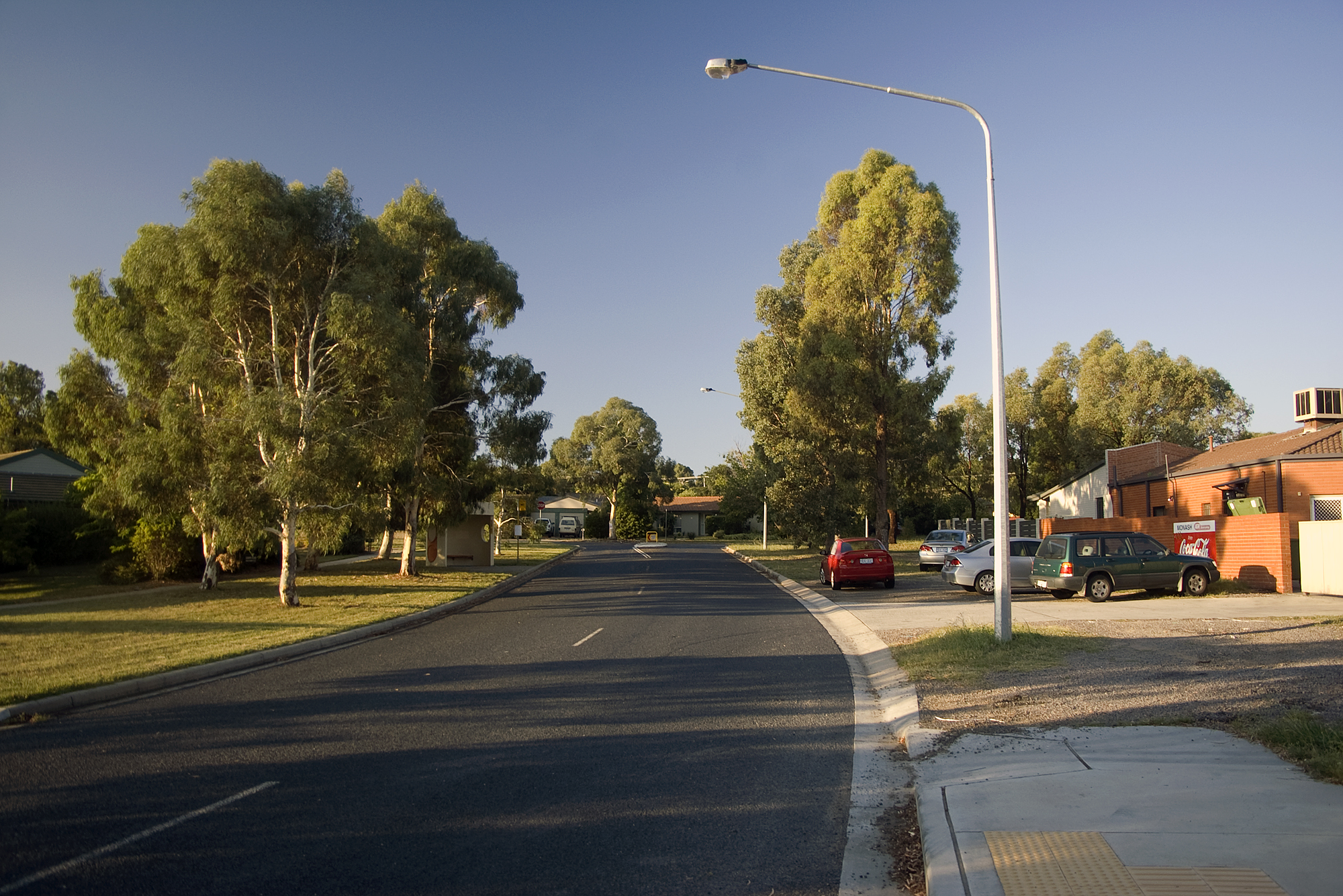
- Cockcroft Avenue

- Coordinates: 35°25′01″S 149°06′00″E
- Country: Australia
- State: Australian Capital Territory
- City: Canberra
- District: Tuggeranong
- Established: 1978

Government
  - Federal division: Bean

Area
  - Total: 3.4 km^{2} (1.3 sq mi)

Population
  - Total: 5,644 (2021 census)
  - Density: 1,660/km^{2} (4,300/sq mi)
- Postcode: 2904
- Gazetted: 5 August 1975
Suburbs around Monash
Oxley	Wanniassa
Greenway	Monash	Gowrie
Bonython	Isabella Plains	Richardson

Monash (postcode 2904) is a suburb in the district of Tuggeranong, Canberra, Australia. The suburb is named after General Sir John Monash, (1865 to 1931), who commanded the Australian Army in France in the First World War. It was gazetted on 1 August 1975 and first settled in 1978. The suburb has an area of 3.41 km^{2}. Streets are named after engineers and the suburb consists primarily of detached houses on suburban blocks.

The suburb is bounded by Erindale Drive, Drakeford Drive, Isabella Drive and Ashley Drive. Located in the suburb is Isabella Pond and part of the Tuggeranong Creek. Facilities include the Goodwin Retirement Village, a primary school and a recreation oval. Monash is serviced by a small local shopping centre, the larger Erindale Shopping Centre at Wanniassa and the nearby Tuggeranong Hyperdome.

== Demographics ==
At the 2021 census, Monash had a population of 5,644 people. The median age of people in Monash was 43 years, above the ACT average of 35. The median individual income was $1,095 per week compared to $1,203 per week across the ACT, while the median household income was $2,164.

The residents of Monash are predominantly Australian born, with 72.3% being born in Australia. The five main countries of birth for those born overseas were England, 3.0%, India, 2.9%, Sri Lanka, 1.4%, New Zealand, 1.1% and Vietnam, 1.0%. The most popular religious affiliations in descending order are no religion, Catholic, Anglican and Islam.

== Geology ==
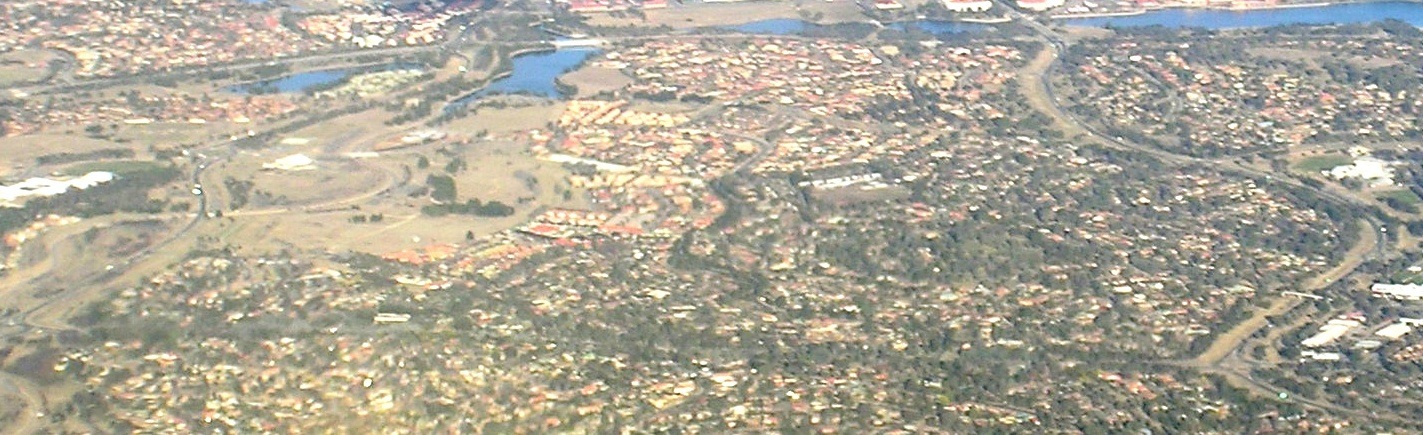
Aerial view from east

Deakin Volcanics green grey, purple and cream rhyolite is in the west of the suburb and Deakin Volcanics green grey and purple rhyodacite occurs in the centre and east. These rocks are from the Silurian period around 414 million years old.

== Amenities ==
=== Canberra Islamic Centre ===
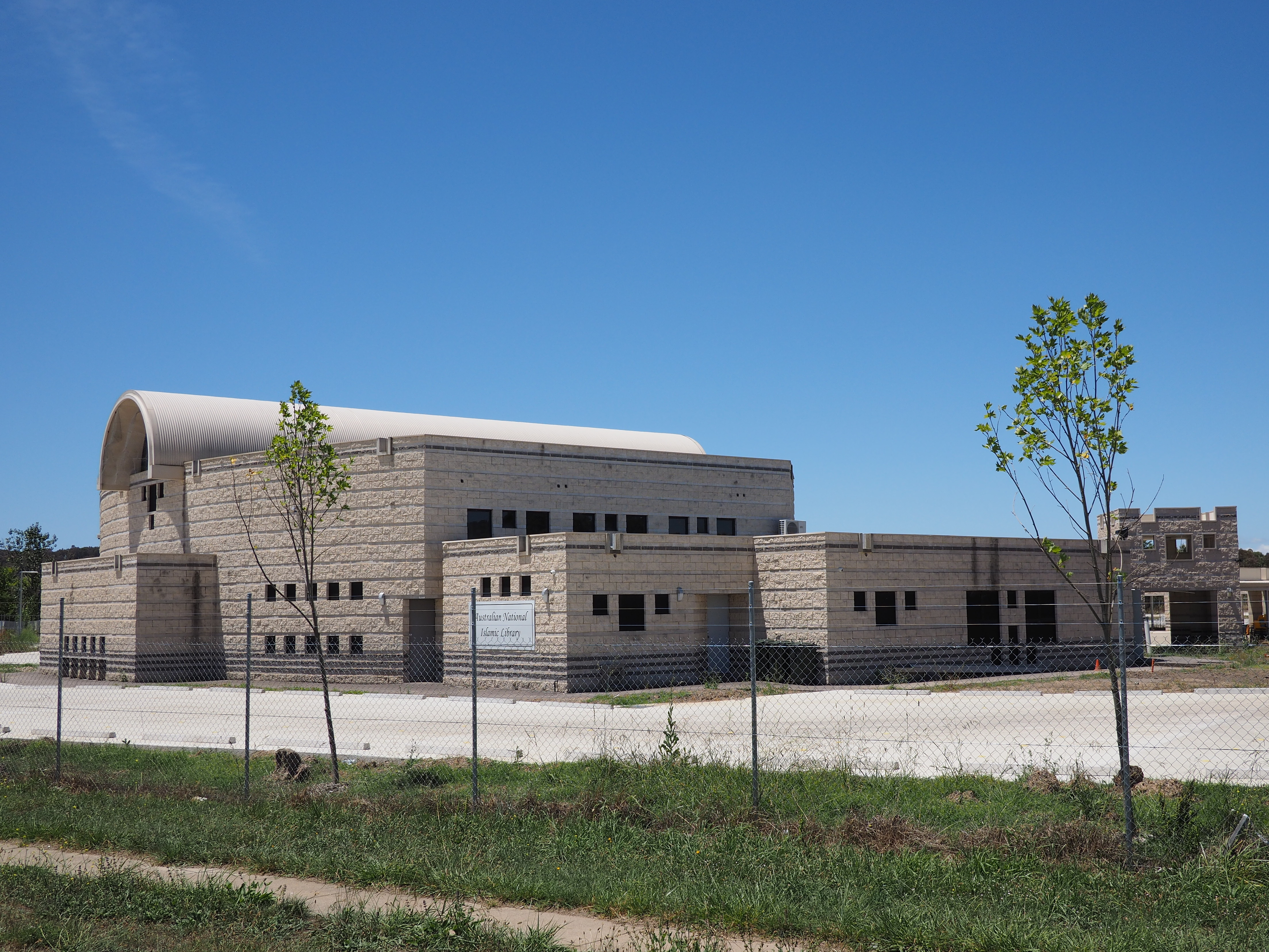
The Canberra Islamic Centre in 2014

Monash is also home to the Canberra Islamic Centre and Australian National Islamic Library, first opened in 1993. The centre, on Clive Steele Avenue, holds regular prayers and a full-time Imam was appointed in 2010. The public library holds more than 30,000 titles.

=== Bureau of Meteorology station ===
Monash is the location of the Bureau of Meteorology's Tuggeranong weather station. This station also records air quality.

=== Shops ===
There is a small collection of local shop buildings at the corner of Barraclough Crescent and Cockcroft Avenue. There are plans for a childcare centre here. A July 1984 planning report noted that the Monash shops were expected to begin trading later in 1984.

== Education ==
Monash Primary School, on Corlette Crescent, is a preschool to Year 6 ACT public school. The school's motto is 'Touch the earth, reach the sky, challenge the future'. The school has a kitchen garden program, band and many other opportunities for enrichment.
