= Oxley, Australian Capital Territory =

Oxley
- Suburb
- Coordinates: 35.40889794099435°S 149.0784174529135°E
- Country: Australia
- State: Australian Capital Territory
- City: Canberra
- District: Tuggeranong
- Established: 1985

Government
  - Territory electorate: Brindabella
  - Federal division: Bean

Area
  - Total: 1.08 km^{2} (0.42 sq mi)

Population
  - Total: 1,703 (SAL 2021)
- Postcode: 2903
- Gazetted: 22 March 1982
Suburbs around Oxley
Greenway	Wanniassa	Wanniassa
Greenway	Oxley	Monash
Greenway	Monash	Monash

Oxley (postcode 2903) is the smallest suburb in Canberra. It is located in the district of Tuggeranong. The suburb is named after the explorer John Joseph William Molesworth Oxley (1783 to 1828), who explored parts of New South Wales. It was gazetted on 22 March 1982 and first settled in 1985. Streets are named after social reformers and the suburb has an area of 1.08 km^{2}.

It is next to the suburbs of Greenway, Wanniassa and Monash and is bounded by Drakeford Drive, Taverner Street and Erindale Drive.

== Geology ==
Deakin Volcanics green grey, purple and cream rhyolite occurs over most of the suburb and Deakin Volcanics green grey and purple rhyodacite is found in the far south east corner. These rocks are from 414 mya in the Silurian period.
