= Kimberley Starr =

Australian novelist and teacher (born 1970)

- Born: January 21, 1970 (age 56); Morgantown, West Virginia
- Occupations: Novelist, teacher
- Writing career
- Notable works: The Kingdom Where Nobody Dies; The Book Of Whispers; Torched

Kimberley Starr (born 1970) is an Australian novelist and teacher. Her debut novel, The Kingdom Where Nobody Dies, was followed by The Book Of Whispers. Her next novel, Torched, was released by Pantera Press in 2020.

== Biography ==
Kimberley Starr was born in 1970 in Morgantown, West Virginia, moving to Australia as a young child. She began her education at the Armidale Demonstration School, moving on to Garran Primary School, and Padua Catholic High School, ACT (now St Mary MacKillop College), before completing her secondary education at Loreto Normanhurst. She holds degrees in literature from the University of Sydney and Macquarie University. Starr currently teaches English at St. Monica’s College, Epping and is a graduate researcher in creative writing at La Trobe University. She lives in Diamond Creek, in Melbourne.

Starr's 2004 debut novel, The Kingdom Where Nobody Dies has been taught as a secondary school text, won the 2003 Queensland Premier's Literary Awards for Best Emerging Author, and was chosen for the 2005 "One Book One Brisbane" reading campaign.

In 2015, Starr won the Text Prize for best manuscript written for young adults and children. The winning manuscript, The Book Of Whispers, was published in October 2016.

== Bibliography ==
Novels

- The Kingdom Where Nobody Dies (UQP 2004)
- The Book Of Whispers (Text Publishing 2016)
- Torched (Pantera Press 2020)
- The Map Of Night (Pantera Press 2022)

Memoir

- "Halfway through the days of our lives". Griffith Review, Edition 13 The Next Big Thing.

== Awards and nominations ==
- 2003 Queensland Premier's Literary Awards, Best Emerging Queensland Author. Winner, The Kingdom Where Nobody Dies
- 2005 Dobbie Award - best first novel by a female author. Shortlist, The Kingdom Where Nobody Dies
- 2005 One Book One Brisbane. Winner, The Kingdom Where Nobody Dies
- 2015 Text Prize. Winner, The Book Of Whispers
