= Kaila McKnight =

Australian athletics competitor

Personal information
- Nationality: Australian
- Born: 5 May 1986 (age 40) Stony Creek, Victoria, Australia
- Height: 172 cm (68 in) (2012)
- Weight: 52 kg (115 lb) (2012)

Sport
- Country: Australia
- Sport: Athletics
- Events: 800 metres 1500 metres One Mile; 3000 metres 5000 metres

Kaila McKnight (born 5 May 1986) is an Australian middle distance runner. She represented Australia at the 2012 Summer Olympics in the 1500 metres event.

== Personal life ==
McKnight was born on 5 May 1986 in Stony Creek near Foster, Victoria and is from Victoria. She attended St Laurence's Catholic Primary School in Victoria before going to Mary MacKillop Catholic Regional College for high school. She then went to Deakin University from 2007 to 2009 where she earned a Bachelor of Commerce. As of 2017, she is a teacher an accountant and married. As of 2012, she lives in the Victorian town of Leongatha.

McKnight is 172 centimetres (68 in) tall and weighs 52 kilograms (115 lb).

== Athletics ==
McKnight is a middle-distance runner and is coached by Nic Bideau, who became her coach in 2009. She is also coached by Richard Huggins who became her coach in 1998. She is a member of the Knox Athletics Club. Her events are the 800 metres, 1500 metres, One Mile, 3000 metres, and 5000 metres.

McKnight has an athletics scholarship from the Victorian Institute of Sport. She does most of her training in Melbourne and London. Running for the national team, she wears number 53.

Her personal best time in the 800 metres is 2:04.04 set in Liége, Belgium on 13 July 2010. Her personal best time in the 1500 metres is 4:05.61 set in Shanghai on 19 May 2012. Her personal best time in the one mile is 4:33.33 set in Cork, Ireland on 17 July 2012. Her personal best time in the 3000 metres is 8:58.46 set in Newcastle, Australia on 29 January 2011. Her personal best time in the 5000 metres is 15:33.77 set in Rovereto on 13 September 2011.

At the 2009 Australian National Championships in the 1500 metres, she finished second. At the 2009 World University Games in Belgrade, Serbia, she finished second in the 1500 metres event with a time of 4:16:10. At the 2010 Australian National Championships in the 1500 metres, she finished first. At the 2010 Commonwealth Games, she finished fifth in her heats in the 1500 metres event with a time of 4:15.22. At the IAAF/VTB Bank Continental Cup 2010 on 5 September in the 1500 metres race, she finished ninth with a time of 4:27.40. At the IAAF/VTB Bank Continental Cup 2010 on 4 September in the 3000 metres race, she finished ninth with a time of 9:24.50. She competed at the 2010 International Sotteville Meeting in France in the 1500 metres event, where she set a personal best. At the 2011 Australian National Championships in the 1500 metres, she finished second. At the 13th IAAF World Championships in Athletics in Daegu on 30 August 2011 in the 1500 metres race, she finished tenth with a time of 4:10.83. At the 39th IAAF World Cross Country Championships in Punta Umbría on 20 March 2011 in the senior race, she finished 69th with a time of 27:59.

Prior to the Australian Olympic qualification period, McKnight spent three months competing overseas. At the 2012 Australian National Championships in the 1500 metres, she finished first and first in the 5000 metres event.

McKnight was selected to represent Australia at the 2012 Summer Olympics in the 1500 metres event, where she made her Olympic debut.

At the 2012 Summer Olympics, she reached the semi-finals of the 1500 metres but was eliminated there.

She competed at the 2014 Commonwealth Games, reaching the final.
