= MacKillop Catholic Regional College =

MacKillop College Werribee

Location
- Werribee, Victoria, 3030; Australia; 37°54′42″S 144°39′57″E

Information
- Funding type: Private with Government Support
- Motto: Freedom and Joy Forever
- Patron saint: St Mary of The Cross MacKillop
- Established: 1970
- Founder: Sr Giovanni
- Principal: Christopher Caldow
- Vice Principal: Nicole Allan
- Deputy Principal: Anna Marazita
- Chaplain: Albert Yogarajah; Anil Mascarenhas; Darien Sticklen
- Staff: 200+
- Grades: Year 7–12
- Enrolment: 1,950+
- Campus: Werribee (Main Campus); 37 acres (14 ha); Werribee South; St. Mary's Campus (Year 9); 2.2 acres (0.8 ha)
- Colours: Green, yellow, red and white
- Fight song: Spirit of MacKillop
- Athletics conference: SACCSS
- Sports: Yes
- Yearbook: MacKillop College Yearbook
- Website: www.mackillop.vic.edu.au

MacKillop Catholic Regional College is a Catholic secondary school in Werribee, Victoria, Australia. It has strong connections to the Josephite sisters, founded by Mary MacKillop. The college was founded as Mary McKillop Girls College in 1970, providing junior secondary education to female students in Years 7, 8 and 9. As demand for secondary education grew in the area, the College expanded to cater to male and female students from Years 7 to 12 and changed its name to reflect these changes. In 2022, MacKillop reached their 50 year anniversary, however celebrations were curtailed due to the COVID-19 pandemic.

== Curriculum ==
Senior students may study Victorian Certificate of Education (VCE) units, Vocational Education and Training, and Victorian Certificate of Applied Learning (VCAL) Certificate courses. The college offers flexible VCE programs with students able to undertake VCE units from Year 10 and study first year university subjects during Year 12.

== Co-curriculum ==
The co-curricular program at MacKillop Catholic Regional College includes tennis, swimming and athletics carnivals, external subject-based competitions and an annual musical. The College is a member of the Sports Association of Catholic Co-educational Secondary Schools (SACCSS), the Victorian Secondary Schools Sports Association and the Catholic All Schools, within which students participate in a variety of sporting competitions. The college also offers tuition in singing and various musical instruments, and students have the opportunity to take exams with the Australian Music Examinations Board.

The four houses and their associated colours are:

- Chisolm (green)
- Flinders (blue)
- Knox (yellow)
- Cook (red)

The houses compete in the annual sporting carnivals. However, annual sporting events are optional for students.

== Notable alumni ==
- Danny Tiatto, Premier League football player who played for Manchester City, Leicester City and the Australian national soccer team
- Brent Prismall, AFL player for the Essendon Football Club and Geelong Football Club.
- Anthony Callea, runner-up of Australian Idol.
- Joanne Ryan, Federal Member for Lalor and Opposition Whip for the Australian Labor Party, Parliament of Australia
- Marny Kennedy, actress, most notably for her role as Taylor Fry in Mortified. Also starred in season of Saddle Club, and in the series Conspiracy 365.
- Jack Fitzpatrick, AFL player for the Melbourne Football Club and Hawthorn Football Club
- Kelli-Anne Oxley, Australian actress.
- Majak Daw, AFL player for the North Melbourne Football Club and Melbourne Football Club
- Mark Bonanno, writer and performer in sketch comedy troupe Aunty Donna.
- Anastasia Kusmawan, Olympian, representing Australia in Artistic Swimming during the 2024 Paris Olympics.
- Logan Morris, AFL player for the Brisbane Lions

== See also ==
- List of schools in Victoria
- MacKillop College, a list of schools named in honor of Mary MacKillop
