= Mary Mackillop Memorial Chapel and Museum =

Church building in Sydney, New South Wales

Coordinates: 33.8388°S 151.2047°E

The Mary Mackillop Memorial Chapel was built in 1913 in honor of Australia's first saint – Mary Mackillop. The chapel is located in Mount Street in North Sydney, considered a place for spiritual retreat in the middle of the North Sydney business district.

The chapel was previously used exclusively by the Sisters of St. Joseph. However, when Mary Mackillop's remains were moved to the chapel in 1994, where the vestry was originally located. Since then, the chapel has become a place of pilgrimage for thousands of people coming to pray and reflect at her tomb.

The Chapel is an imposing building. The facade is set by stone traceried windows . Above which are tall commanding spires of carved stone. The Chapel's altar, lectern, and chair are all made from white marble. Images of saints displayed in stained glass and statues adorn the Chapel.

Apart from the Chapel, a museum has also been incorporated in the compound. This facility attracts busses of crowds and or tourists, both local and foreign, wanting to know more about the life of Australia's first saint. The museum is equipped with state of the art technological gadgets and facilities to help provide visitors with a truly transcendental experience to relive Mary Mackillops days. Her life story is weaved by the different sections of the museum. It is also divided in several buildings, each depicting a phase of Mary's life.
