= Greenway, Australian Capital Territory =

Greenway
- Suburb
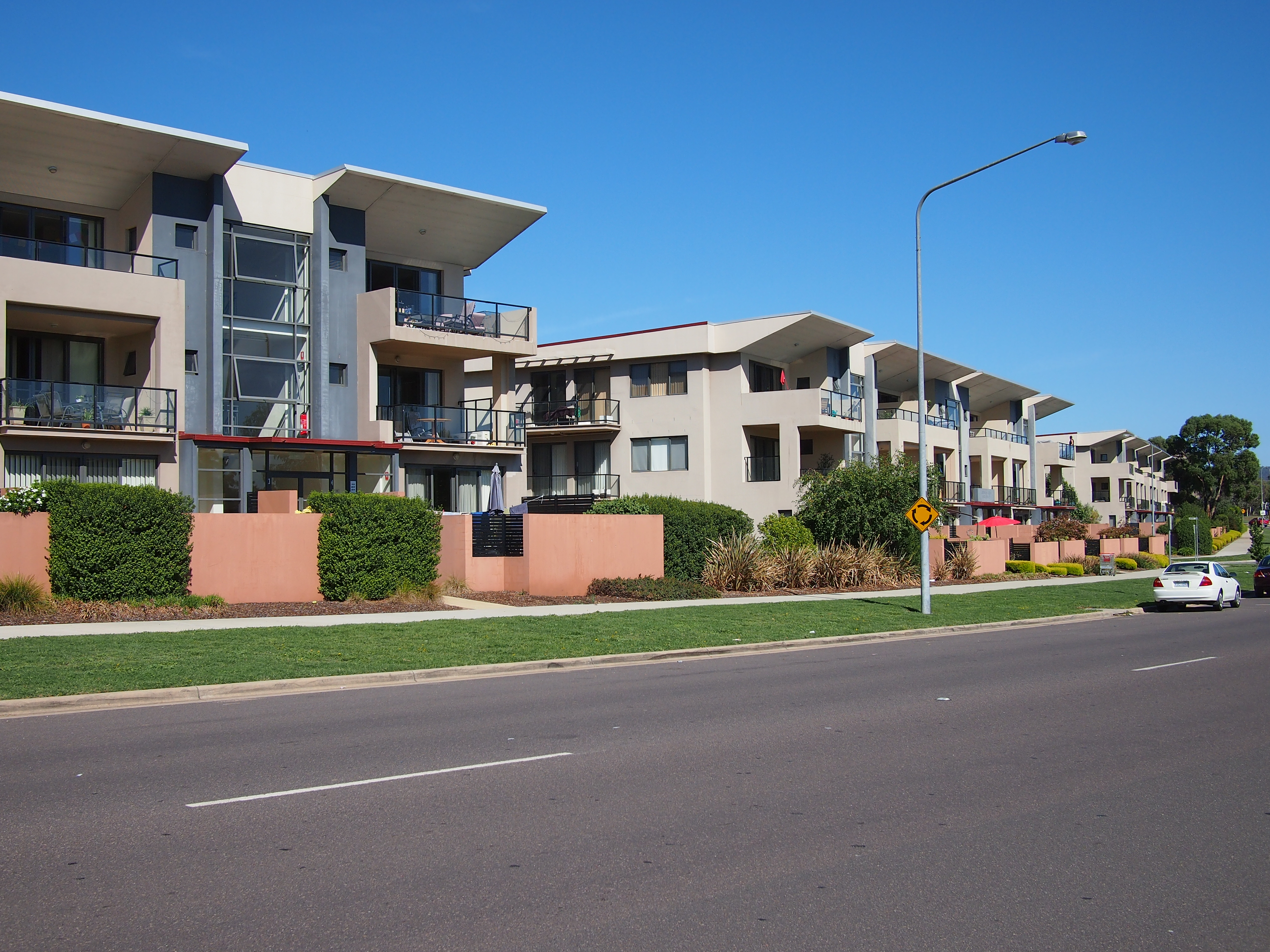
- Apartments on Anketell Street

- Coordinates: 35°25′05″S 149°04′12″E
- Country: Australia
- State: Australian Capital Territory
- City: Canberra
- District: Tuggeranong
- Established: 1988

Government
  - Territory electorate: Brindabella
  - Federal division: Bean

Area
  - Total: 5.3 km^{2} (2.0 sq mi)

Population
  - Total: 4,129 (2021 census)
  - Density: 779/km^{2} (2,018/sq mi)
- Postcode: 2900
- Gazetted: 17 October 1986
Suburbs around Greenway
Urambi Hills	Kambah	Oxley
Murrumbidgee River corridor	Greenway	Monash
Murrumbidgee River corridor	Murrumbidgee River corridor	Bonython

Greenway is a suburb in the Canberra, Australia district of Tuggeranong. The postcode is 2900. The suburb is named after the architect, Francis Greenway (1777–1837). It was gazetted on 17 October 1986. The streets are named after architects. It includes the Tuggeranong Town Centre, Lake Tuggeranong and small residential areas on the northwestern and northeastern shores of the lake.

It is next to the suburbs of Kambah, Wanniassa, Oxley, Monash and Bonython. It is bounded by Athllon Drive and Drakeford Drive. Behind the suburb is the Urambi Hills Nature Reserve and the Murrumbidgee River.

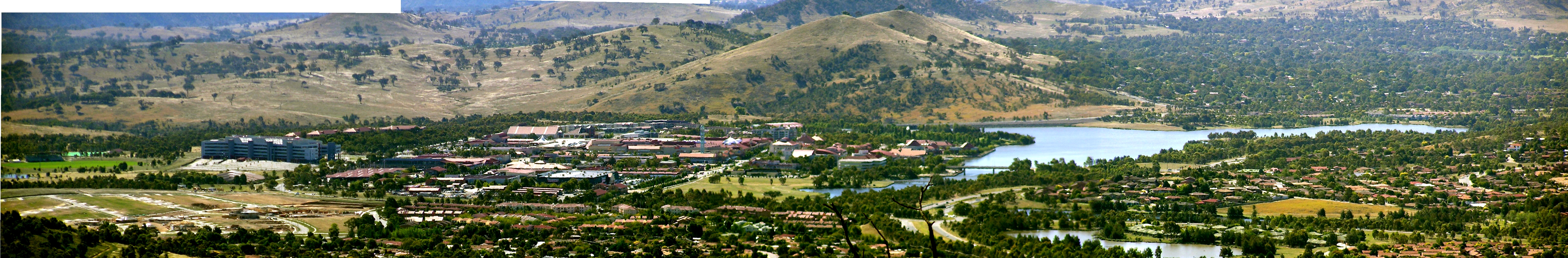
Greenway from Tuggeranong Hill. New Centrelink building on the left. Lake Tuggeranong is prominent on the right with a backdrop of the Urambi Hills.

== Demographics ==
At the 2021 census, there were 4,129 people in Greenway, more than double the 1,894 at the 2016 census. 64.5% of people were born in Australia. The next most common country of birth was India at 6.8%. 71.0% of people spoke only English at home. The most common responses for religion were No Religion 40.0%, Catholic 17.9%, Hinduism 9.4% and Anglican 8.1%. In 2021, 63.2% of dwellings were flats or apartments (compared to 43.7% in 2016) and 34.0% were semi-detached, row or terrace houses (compared to 51.2% in 2016).

== Geology ==
Greenway is built on top of Laidlaw Volcanics as is the west side of Tuggeranong. Rhyodacitic ignimbrite is in the form of grey rhyodacitic and dacitic crystal tuff of upper Silurian age. This kind of rock was formed from massive explosive volcanic eruptions that blasted a vast cloud of hot dust into the air. The explosion would have dwarfed the recent Mount St Helens eruption.
