= Isabella Plains =

- Suburb
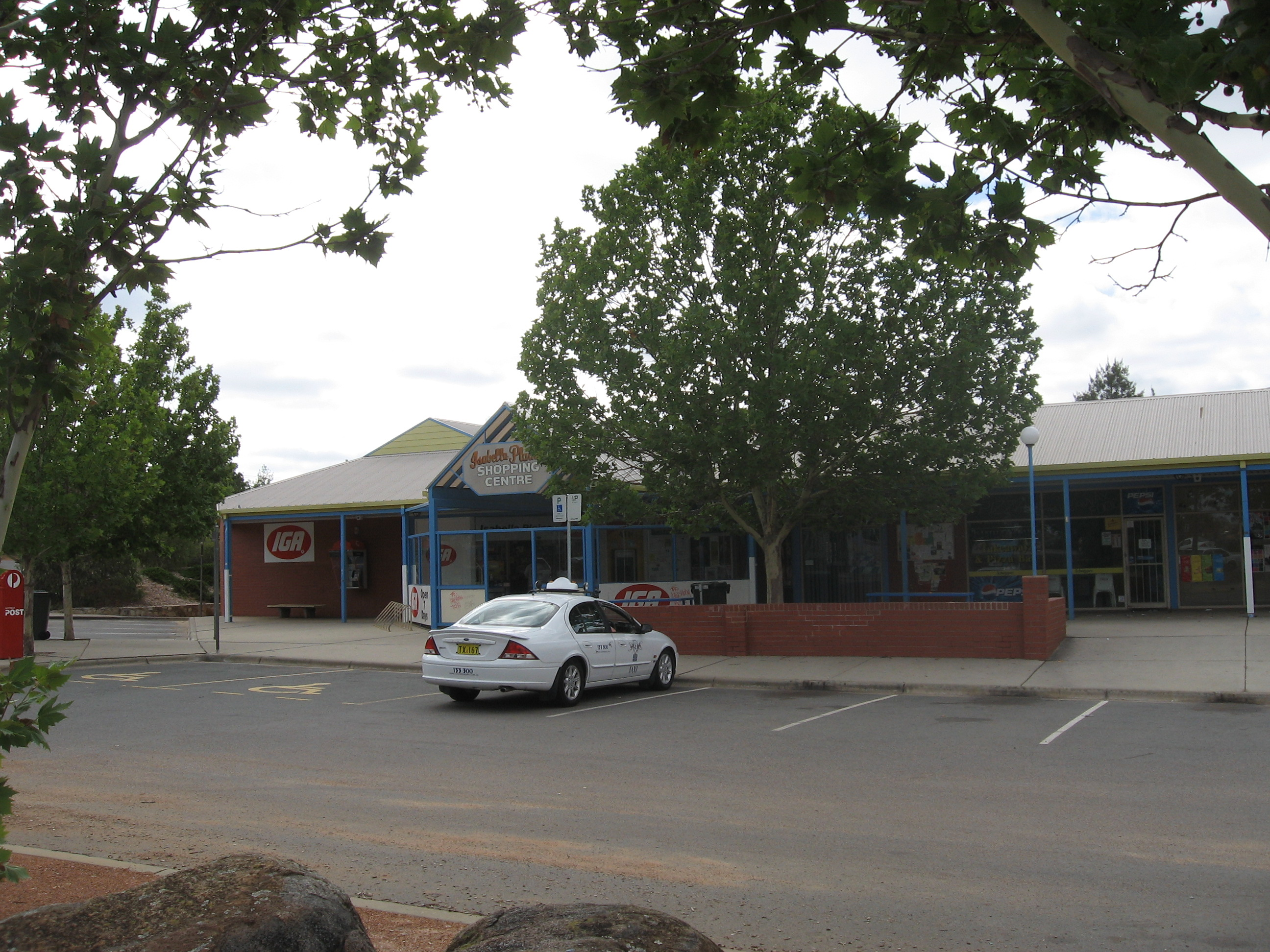
- Isabella Plains shops

- Coordinates: 35°25′41″S 149°05′42″E
- Country: Australia
- State: Australian Capital Territory
- City: Canberra
- District: Tuggeranong
- Established: 1985

Government
  - Territory electorate: Brindabella
  - Federal division: Bean

Area
  - Total: 2.5 km^{2} (0.97 sq mi)

Population
  - Total: 4,329 (SAL 2021)
- Postcode: 2905
- Gazetted: 5 August 1975
Suburbs around Isabella Plains
Greenway	Monash	Gowrie
Bonython	Isabella Plains	Richardson
Gordon	Calwell	Calwell

Isabella Plains is a suburb in the Canberra, Australia district of Tuggeranong. The suburb is indirectly named after Isabella Maria Brisbane (1821–1849), who was the daughter of Sir Thomas Brisbane, the colonial Governor of New South Wales when the area was first explored by white settlers in 1823. Joseph Wild was employed by Brigade Major John Ovens and Captain Mark Currie to guide them to the Murrumbidgee River. They travelled south along the river and named the area now known as Tuggeranong "Isabella's Plain". This name was adopted, with a slight change of spelling, for the name of the new suburb. It was gazetted on 5 August 1975. Streets are named after New South Wales parish names.

It is next to the suburbs of Monash, Bonython, Richardson and Calwell. It is bounded by Isabella Drive, Drakeford Drive, Johnson Drive and Ashley Drive. Located in the suburb are a small group of shops, the senior campus of St Mary MacKillop College, Isabella Plains Primary School, the Tuggeranong automatic weather station and Isabella Plains neighbourhood oval.

== Facilities ==
=== Shops ===
A small shopping centre is located on the corner of Ellerston Avenue and Galloway Street. This includes a small supermarket, a hairdresser, a pathology clinic, a chemist and a takeaway shop. There is also an Isabella Plains Neighbourhood house, and a small doctors surgery opposite and to the right of the shops.

=== Community facilities ===
An early childhood centre exists next to Isabella Plains Primary School on Ellerston Avenue, offering day care and children's health services. Since 2011 this has been run by Communities at Work. After school care is also available through Isabella Plains Primary School.

A Neighbourhood Centre shares a car park with the shops. This centre is available for general hire by the community and hosts, among other things, several daytime playgroups for mothers with young children in connection with the Playgroups Association.

=== Churches ===
- Isabella Plains is in the Catholic parish of Corpus Christi which has its church in Gowrie.

== Education ==
Government schools

- Isabella Plains Early Childhood School, a P-2 school. Isabella Plains Primary School was changed from a full primary school to a Preschool - Year 2 school in 2009, due to low population.

Isabella Plains residents get preference for:

- Isabella Plains Early Childhood School
- A shared Priority Enrollment Area (PEA) of Bonython Primary, Monash Primary, and Richardson Primary
- Calwell High School
- Lake Tuggeranong College

Non-government schools

- St Mary MacKillop College

== Gallery ==
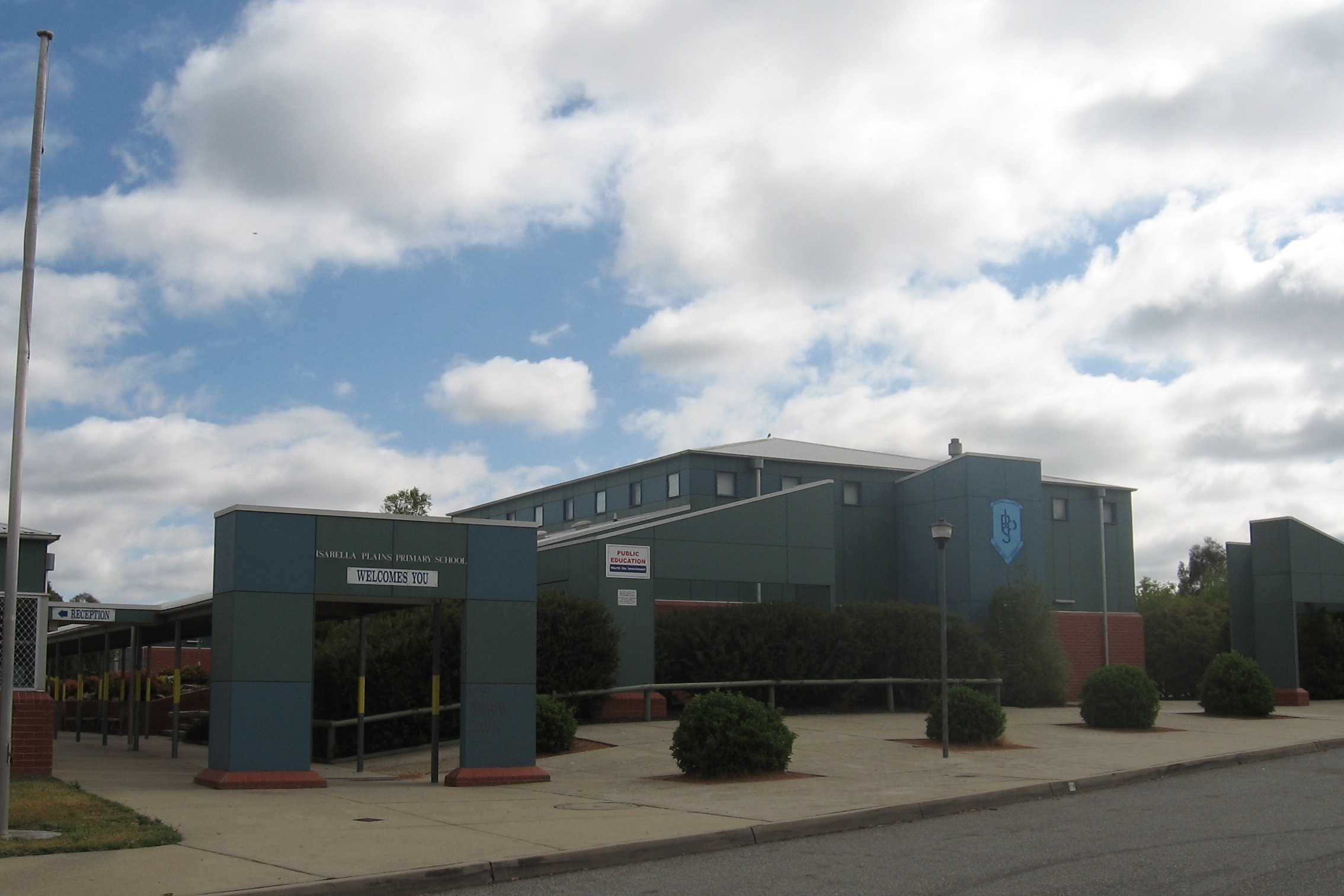
Isabella Plains Primary School

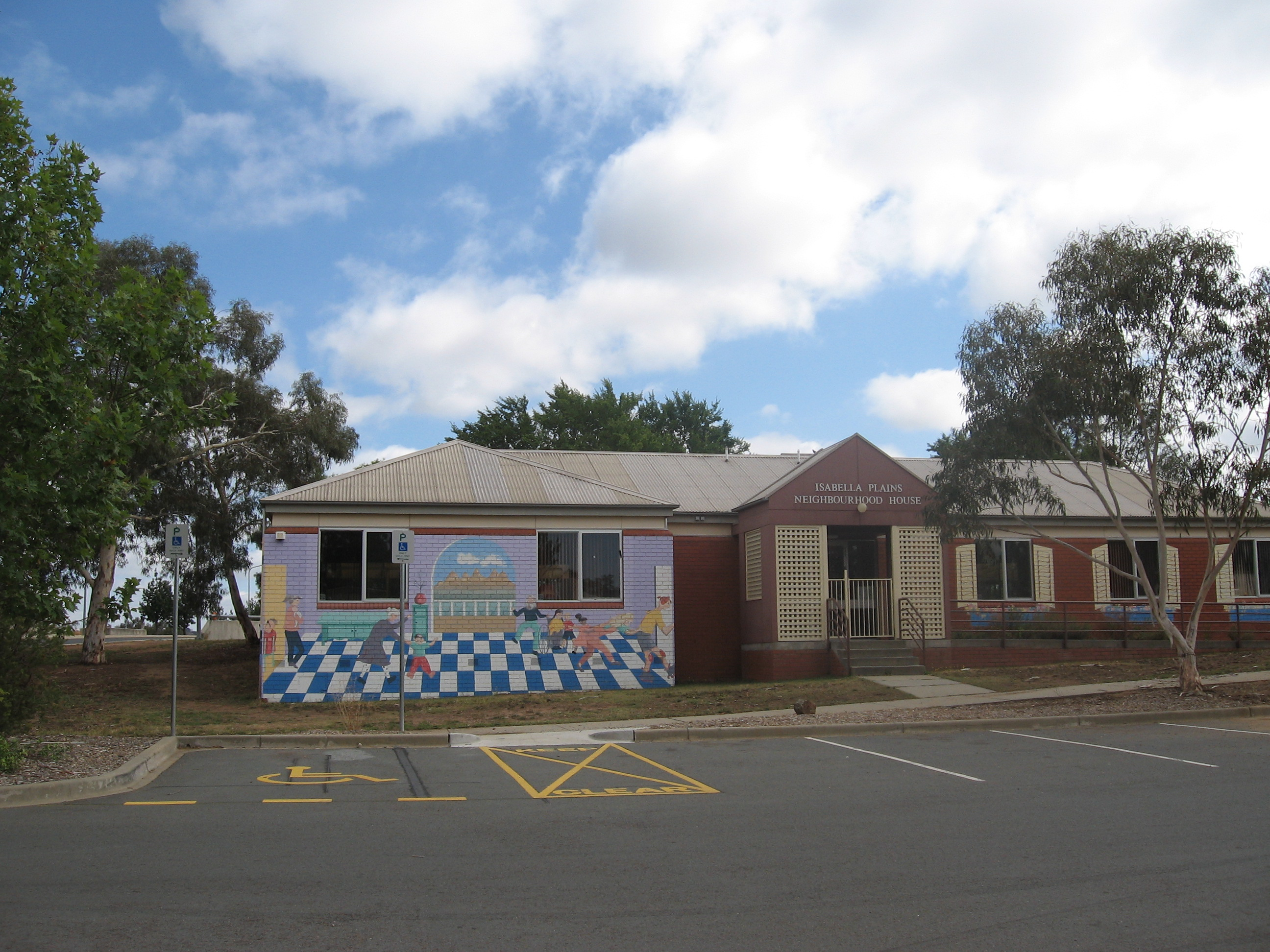
Isabella Plains Neighbourhood Centre, located next to the shops

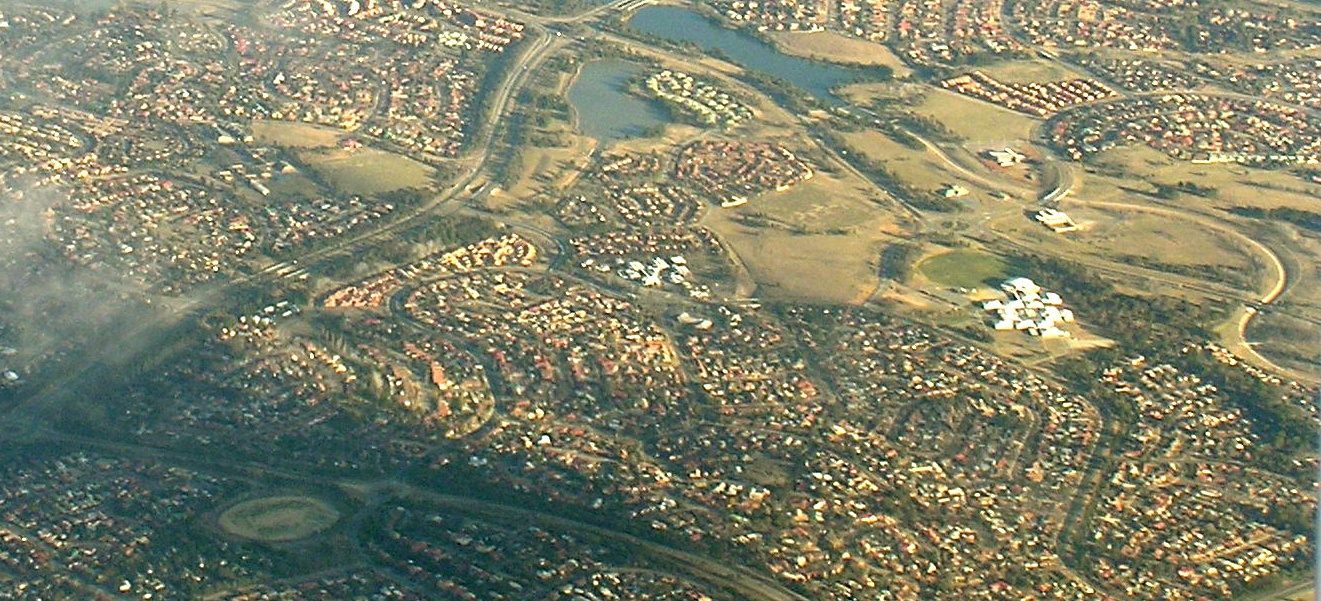
Aerial photo from south east

== Geology ==
Deakin Volcanics green grey and purple rhyodacite underlies the suburb. These rocks are from the Silurian period. But it is overlaid by alluvium in the low-lying parts.
