= St Mary MacKillop College, Swan Hill =

St Mary MacKillop College

Location
- Swan Hill, Victoria; Australia; 35°20′32″S 143°33′24″E

Information
- Type: Independent co-educational secondary school
- Motto: Latin: In Dio Fede Costante (In God my faith is constant)
- Denomination: Roman Catholic
- Established: 1987; 39 years ago
- Principal: Michelle Haeusler
- Staff: 80
- Enrolment: 600
- Website: smmc.vic.edu.au

St Mary MacKillop College, also known as MacKillop College, is an independent Roman Catholic co-educational secondary school located in Swan Hill, Victoria, Australia. The school is located in the parish of Swan Hill within the Roman Catholic Diocese of Ballarat.

== Overview ==
Moves to open a secondary school to service the Swan Hill, Kerang and Quambatook Parishes began in 1981; prior to this Catholic education was only available to primary school children in the area. The school was opened in 1987, having operated classes for students in Years 7 and 8 out of St Mary's Primary School since 1983. Educating young people in remote areas is central to both orders. The school is named for the Australian educationalist Mary MacKillop, and the school motto is that of the MacKillop family.

MacKillop College offers an international study program, Intercultural Education Today, with students primarily from Japan. Students begin their study at MacKillop in Year 10 and may continue through Year 11 and 12. The program is promoted as allowing student to become fluent in English: courses include English as a second language, core subjects in Japanese and electives with local students, and students live with local families during their study.

MacKillop College ran an exchange program for year 8 with Emmanuel College, Warrnambool, until 2006.

== Principals ==
MacKillop College's first principal was a Josephite sister; having had a series of lay principals, the school's current principal, Michelle Haeusler who replaced Rob Aron who replaced Marist Brother Tony Paterson in 2011.

== Notable alumni ==
- Ross Smith – Australian representative to the 2012 Olympics in badminton
- Brent Daniels – AFL Footballer
- Paddy Dow – AFL Footballer
- Thomson Dow – AFL Footballer
