= Mary MacKillop Interpretive Centre =

Coordinates: 37°22′45″S 140°50′22″E

The Mary MacKillop Interpretive Centre is located in Penola, South Australia. It is close to the two State Heritage sites of Petticoat Lane and the original stone schoolhouse developed by Mary MacKillop in conjunction with Father Julian Tenison Woods in the 19th century.

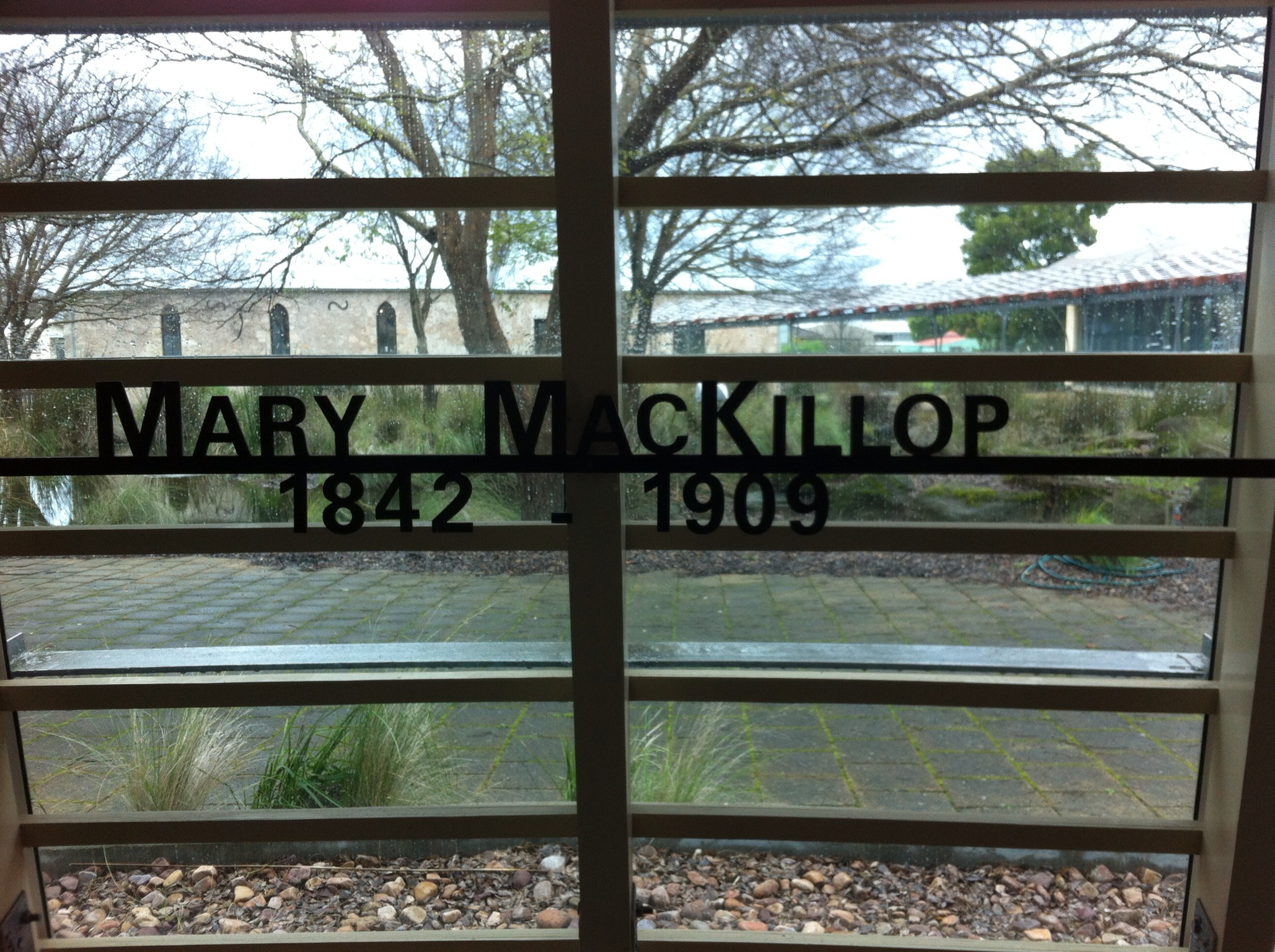
Window looking to Mary MacKillop Interpretative Centre Penola

The Mary Mackillop Interpretive Centre was constructed at Penola in order to centralise many management, interpretive and commercial functions and to accommodate an ever increasing number of visitors. The Mary MacKillop Interpretive Centre opened in 1998 and is housed in an architecturally designed facility. It was refurbished in 2024. It is one of many museums and displays created worldwide to portray the life and achievements of Mary MacKillop. A committee of local volunteers donates their time to open this display to the public.

Within the centre are two main sections, one focussing on the life of Mary MacKillop and the other on Father Julian Tenison Woods, a priest that was also a major figure in Penola's development. The display explores the beginnings of the Catholic education system and the foundation of a new religious institute formed by Woods and MacKillop in the late 19th century, called the Sisters of Saint Joseph of the Sacred Heart.
