= St Mary MacKillop College, Albury =

Coordinates: 35°57′45″S 146°53′35″E

St Mary MacKillop College
- Jindera, New South Wales; Australia

Information
- School type: Independent Catholicism, coeducational, primary school and secondary school
- Motto: Latin: Verum, Pulchrum Et Bonum
- Religious affiliation: Catholic
- Established: 2009
- Principal: Ian Smith
- Grades: K–12 -->
- Enrolment: 216
- Campus type: Rural
- Website: smmc.nsw.edu.au

St Mary MacKillop College (formerly Blessed Mary MacKillop Colleges Albury) is an independent school, located in Jindera, New South Wales, Australia. The school was established in 2009 offering enrolments for Kindergarten to Year 12.

While the school is independent from the Roman Catholic Diocese of Wagga Wagga, it has a strong Catholic ethos with a religious education based on the Catechism of the Catholic Church and an emphasis on the lives of the saints as role models.

Through the entire school year holy and religious catholic events partake at the school ranging from Mass of the Saints in November to weekly Thursday mass in the church "St Mary Help of Christians" next door.

In 2023, there were 201 total enrolments, with 93 being identified as male, and 108 identified as female. There were 21 teaching staff and 8 non-teaching staff.

== Principals ==
Years	Name
2009-2015	Kevin Tingle
2016-2018	Luke Burton
2019	Kathleen Horsfall (Acting Principal)
2020-	Ian Smith

The school was the top performing secondary school for the Riverina District in the 2022 nationwide NAPLAN test scheme.

== See also ==
- List of non-government schools in New South Wales
