= Mary MacKillop Catholic Regional College =

Location
- Leongatha, Victoria; Australia; 38°28′3″S 145°57′48″E

Information
- Type: Independent co-educational secondary school
- Motto: Latin: Sapentia Domini Docet Nos (The wisdom of the Lord teaches us)
- Denomination: Roman Catholic
- Established: 1986; 40 years ago
- Website: mackillopleongatha.catholic.edu.au

Mary MacKillop Catholic Regional College is an independent Roman Catholic co-educational secondary school, located in Leongatha, Victoria, Australia. The college s services the South Gippsland parishes of Foster, Wonthaggi, Cowes, Korumburra and Leongatha.

== History ==
The site of the college was purchased in the 1950s; at that stage students seeking a Catholic education had to travel to the Latrobe Valley or to boarding schools in Melbourne or elsewhere. A working party to establish the college began work in the late 1970s, and the school opened to its first students in 1986 on the grounds of a local primary school. The college moved to its permanent site in 1987 and the first permanent purpose-built buildings were constructed in 1989. Government funding and local fundraising have allowed several extensions to be constructed since then.

== Notable alumni ==
- Xavier Lindsay – Australian rules footballer for Melbourne
- Kaila McKnight – middle distance runner, representative to the 2012 Olympics
- Angus McLaren – actor who is best known for his roles in the television series Packed to the Rafters as Nathan Rafter and H_{2}O: Just Add Water as Lewis McCartney.
- Eleanor Patterson – Gold medallist in High Jump at the 2014 Commonwealth Games
