= St Mary MacKillop College, Canberra =

School in Canberra, Australia

St Mary MacKillop College

Location
- Tuggeranong, Australian Capital Territory; Australia; 35.424483°S 149.092455°E 35.404976°S 149.090931°E

Information
- Type: Co-educational secondary college
- Motto: Faith and Courage
- Denomination: Roman Catholic
- Established: 1997
- Principal: Michael Lee
- Staff: 199
- Enrolment: 1873
- Campus: Years 7–9; Junior campus Years 10–12; Senior campus
- Colours: Navy, teal and white
- Affiliation: Associated Southern Colleges
- Website: mackillop.act.edu.au

St Mary MacKillop College, formerly known as MacKillop Catholic College, is a Catholic high school in the Australian capital of Canberra, with two campuses in the Tuggeranong Valley. The school is the result of an amalgamation of Padua High School and St. Peter's College in 1997. Mackillop College accepts students from year 7 to 12. There are two campuses of St Mary MacKillop Catholic College, the junior campus (years 7 to 9) in Wanniassa and the senior campus (years 10 to 12) in Isabella Plains.

== Administration ==
The College is divided into four houses for administration, pastoral care and extra curricular purposes. These houses – Mindygari, Meup Meup, Gurabang and Ngadyung – represent the four classical elements, with names derived from the language the Ngunnawal people, the local Aboriginal people.

== Executive ==
Sister Noeline Quinnane, a member of the religious order founded by the college's patron, Mary MacKillop, was the founding principal of St. Mary MacKillop College, serving from 1997 to 2003. Moira Najdecki served as principal at MacKillop from 2004 until 2006. Moria Najdecki left at the end of 2006 to take up the role of Director of the Catholic Education Office. Rita Daniels moved across from St Clare's College to take up the role of acting principal in 2007, returning to be principal at St. Clare's College in 2008. Michael Lee succeeded Rita Daniels as principal beginning in January 2008, having previously held positions at Hennessy Catholic College and Mt. Carmel School, Yass.

Paul O'Callagan has been Campus Head at Wanniassa from 2005 until 2008. Louis White took on campus head in 2009; Sandra Darley has been campus head at Isabella since 2008. Each campus also has an assistant principal of pastoral care and an assistant principal of curriculum; there is a cross-campus bursar; and the school also has other executive positions intermittently.

== Notable alumni ==
- Melissa Breen – sprinter at the 2012 Olympics
- Rebecca Henderson – mountain biker
- Kat Lewis – paralympic swimmer
- Zed Seselja – Former Liberal opposition leader in The Legislative Assembly of The Australian Capital Territory & Federal Senator for the Australian Capital Territory
- Kimberley Starr – novelist, attended Padua High School from 1982–1985.
- Carl Valeri – Socceroos midfielder

== See also ==
- List of schools in the Australian Capital Territory
