= Bonython, Australian Capital Territory =

Bonython
- Suburb
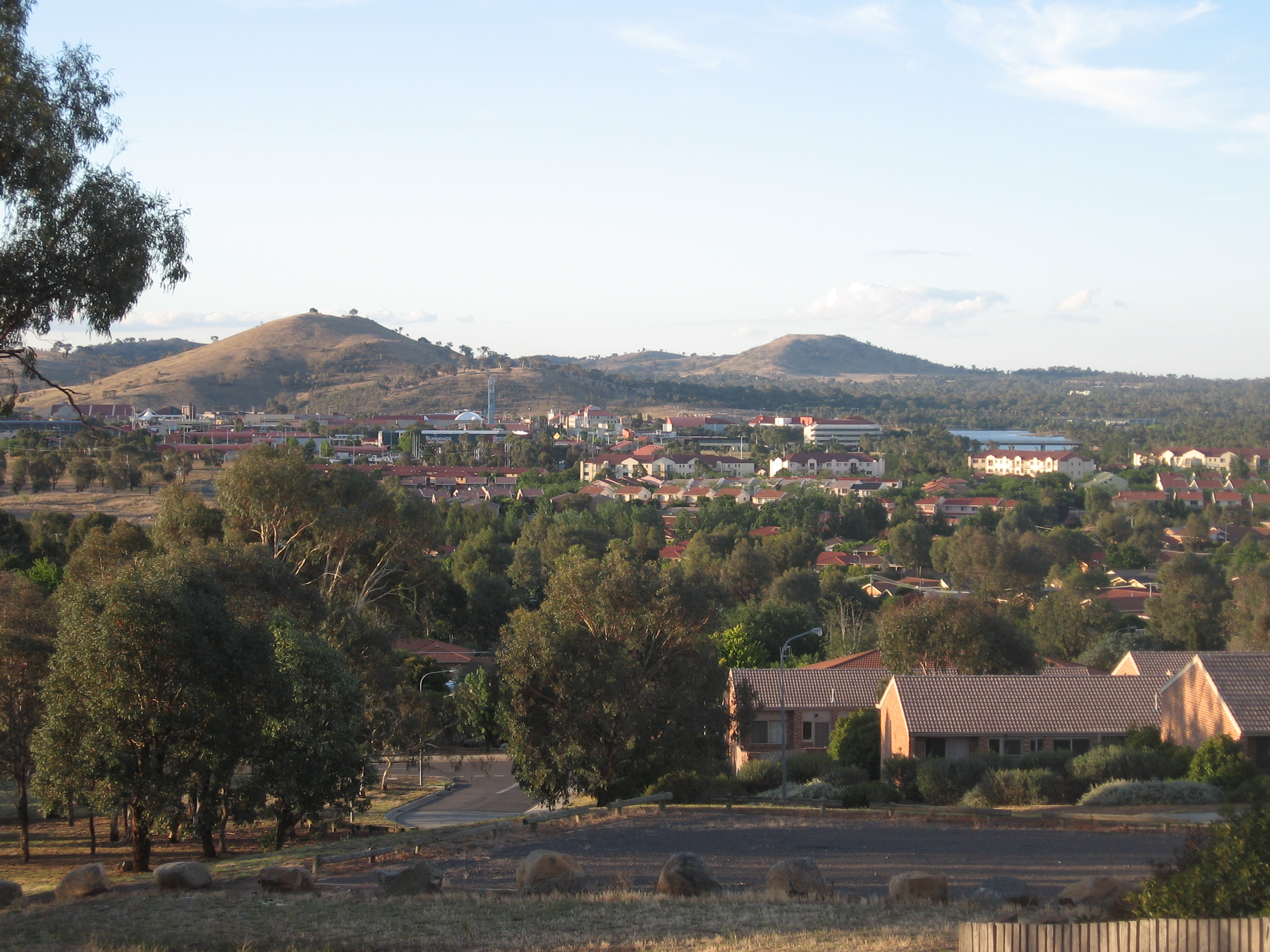
- View across Bonython toward the Tuggeranong Town Centre

- Coordinates: 35°25′52″S 149°04′55″E
- Country: Australia
- State: Australian Capital Territory
- City: Canberra
- District: Tuggeranong
- Established: 1989

Government
  - Territory electorate: Brindabella
  - Federal division: Bean

Area
  - Total: 2.9 km^{2} (1.1 sq mi)

Population
  - Total: 3,839 (2021 census)
  - Density: 1,324/km^{2} (3,430/sq mi)
- Postcode: 2905
- Gazetted: 17 October 1986
Suburbs around Bonython
Greenway	Greenway	Monash
Murrumbidgee River Corridor	Bonython	Isabella Plains
Murrumbidgee River Corridor	Gordon	Calwell

Bonython (/bəˈnaɪθən/) is a suburb of Tuggeranong, a township in southern Canberra, capital city of Australia.

== History ==
The suburb is named after Sir John Langdon Bonython, the owner of The Advertiser (Adelaide) who promoted Federation, and was a member of the first Australian parliament. Original concept plans for Tuggeranong indicate that the suburb was initially to be known as "Stranger". The name "Bonython" was declared when it was gazetted as a suburb of Canberra on 17 October 1986. Streets in Bonython are named after prominent South Australians, particularly journalists, and South Australian Districts and Rivers.

Prior to 1986, the land upon which Bonython now sits was grazing land, mainly grassland with scattered eucalypt trees. By 1989, construction of houses and the Lower Stranger Pond water quality control pond began and Canberra’s newest suburb was born.

On 18 January 2003, the disastrous Canberra bushfire reached Bonython late in the afternoon. By that time, the winds had eased and the fire intensity was such that, where the fire reached housing on the western and southern fringes, residents were able to keep the fire at bay at their fencelines.

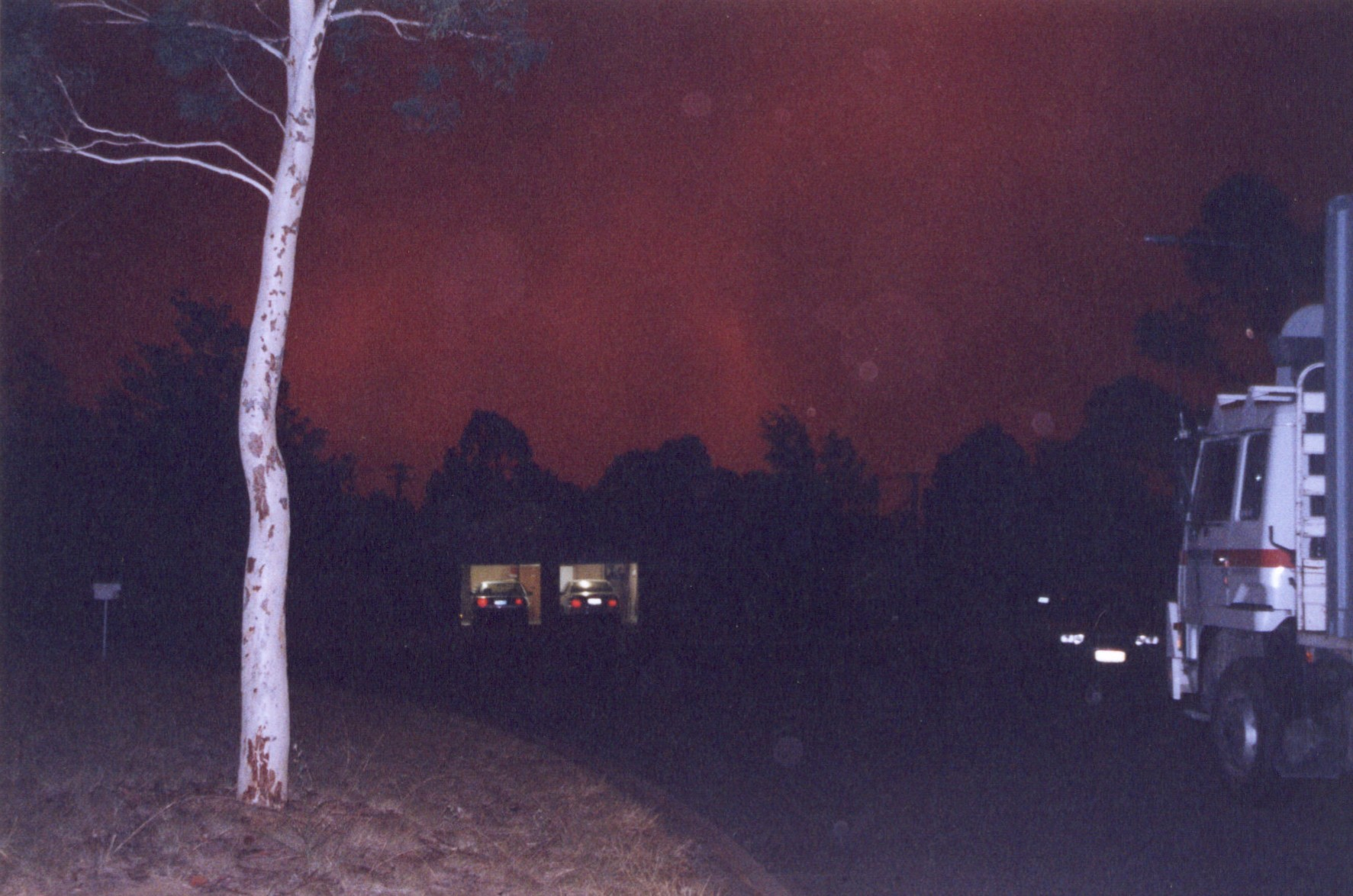
Bushfire threatens houses in western Bonython 18 January 2003

== Geography ==
Bonython is an elongate suburb, straddling the eastern and northern sides of Mount Stranger, a low hillside (altitude 660 metres ASL) that rises about 100 metres above the Tuggeranong valley floor. Lower Stranger Pond sits at the northern end of the suburb, formed by a manmade dam across a natural drainage channel. The Pond surroundings were landscaped early during the suburb’s construction and have now become a focus for a variety of native wildlife, including black swans, pelicans and kangaroos. The Pond surroundings provide popular walking trails through bushland for local residents, and some trails connect with the Canberra equestrian trail and the Kambah Pool to Pine Island Walking Track.

Bonython adjoins the suburbs of Greenway to the north, Isabella Plains to the east and Gordon to the south. On the western side of Bonython is a nature reserve bordering the Murrumbidgee River.

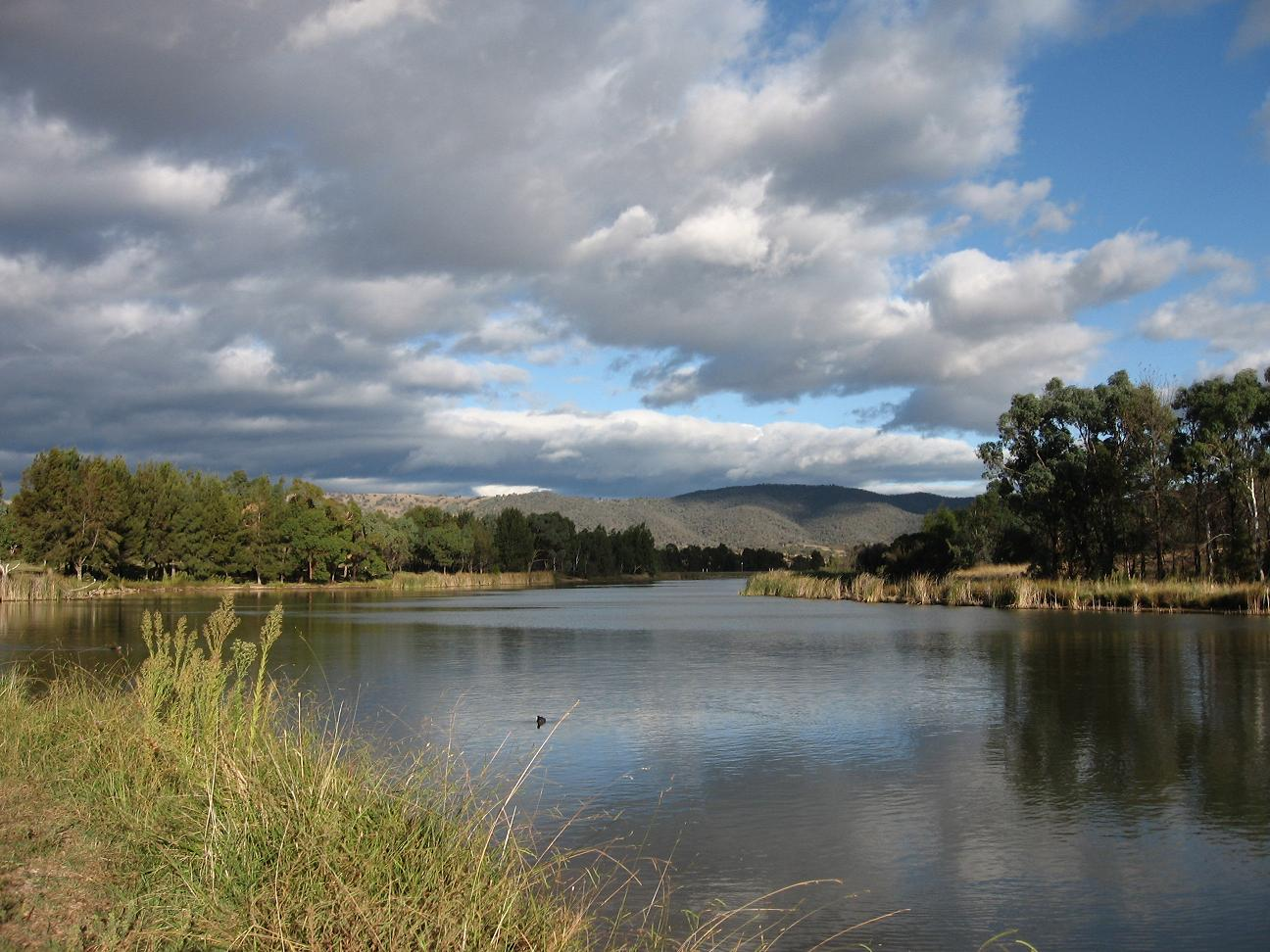
Lower Stranger Pond

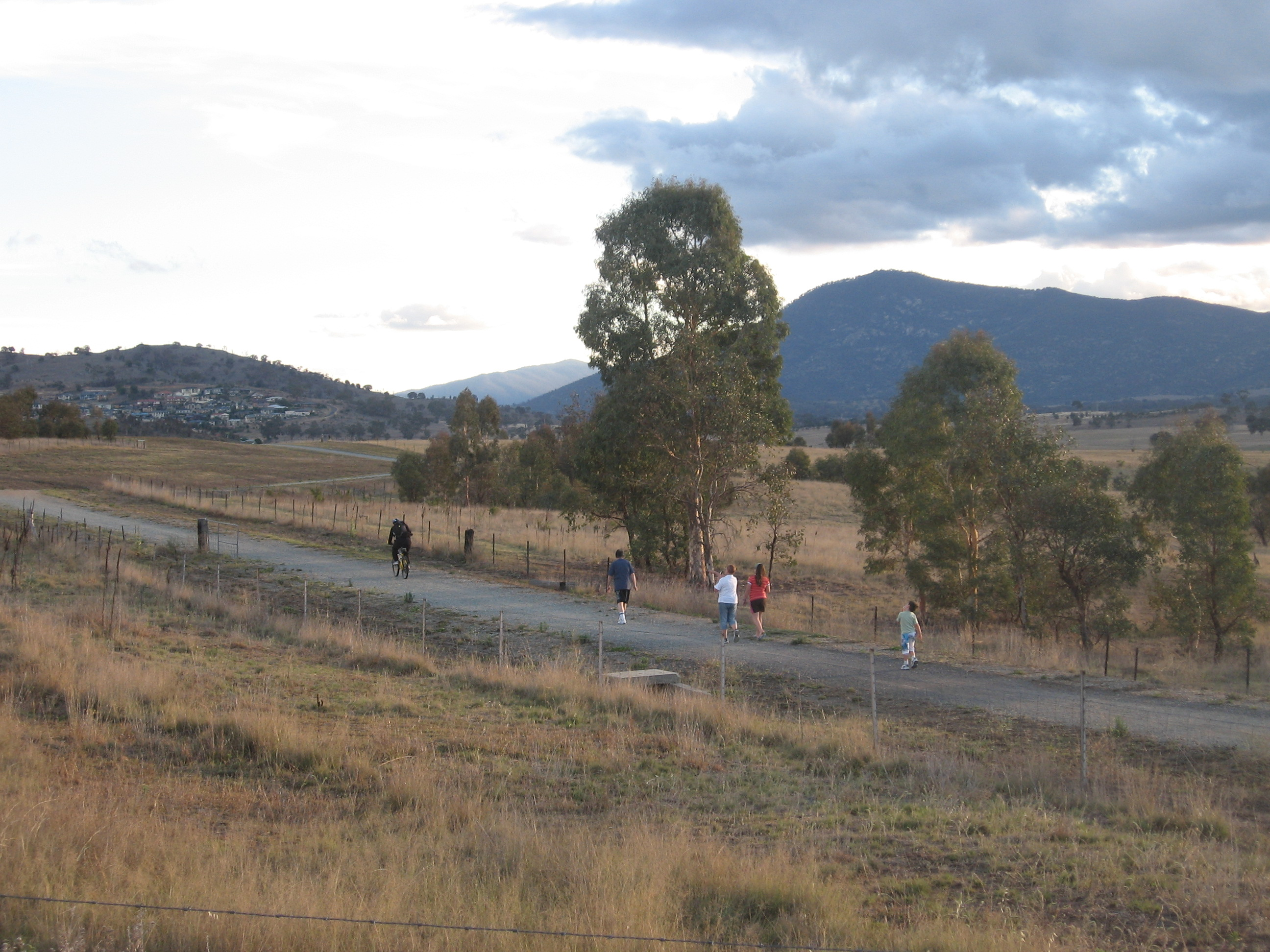
Walking Trail - Bonython To Gordon

== Demographics ==
Like many Canberra suburbs, Bonython accommodates a dormitory community, with the working population commuting to places of employment in nearby Tuggeranong or elsewhere within Canberra or Queanbeyan (a nearby city in New South Wales). The suburb is conveniently close to a number of major employers in the nearby Tuggeranong Town Centre (distance 1–2 kilometres). Employment in the Town Centre is provided by a number of Commonwealth government agencies, such as Services Australia and the Department of Social Services as well as numerous retail outlets in and around the South.Point Tuggeranong shopping mall. Many Bonython residents can walk to work.

The 2021 census data for Bonython showed:

- Of occupied private dwellings, 59.3% were separate houses, 29.7% were semi-detached, row or terrace houses, townhouses etc and 11.2% were flats or apartments.
- The most common ancestries were: Australian 35.2%, English 32.4%, Irish 11.3%, Scottish 10.6% and Indian 4.3%.
- Of the families in Bonython, 45.1% were couple families with children, 31.8% were couple families without children and 20.4% were one parent families.

== Amenities ==
Being so close to the Tuggeranong Town Centre, Bonython contains very few shops of its own – a general store and a couple of niche shops. In the centre of the suburb is the Bonython Primary School, opened by Queen Elizabeth II in 1992. Located in Hurtle Avenue and adjoining the Bonython shops, it is a public school operated by the ACT Government (Department of Education and Training) and includes Bonython Pre-school. The school’s catchment area is primarily the suburb of Bonython itself – 68%.of students live within the school’s catchment area, while 32% of students are 'out-of-area'. According to the Department’s publication Towards 2020 Renewing Our Schools For the Future, Bonython Primary School had 365 children enrolled in 2006 (capacity 400), sufficient numbers to ensure the school’s survival to 2010 and beyond. Bonython Pre-school had 65 children enrolled in 2006. The school was designed for conversion into unit-style residential accommodation when, eventually, school enrolments are insufficient to sustain its continued operation.

On Barr-Smith Avenue, close to the Bonython Primary School, is Kindy Patch Child Care Centre. This Centre provides childcare to working parents.

Between Bonython Primary School and Drakeford Drive is the Bonython Neighbourhood oval. This is a community oval, used by school students on school days and by various Tuggeranong sporting clubs on weekends. The oval surface suffered badly during the 2000-2010 drought and was not maintained for much of that time due to water restrictions. However, in 2013, the oval was restored to a good quality.

== Changes ==
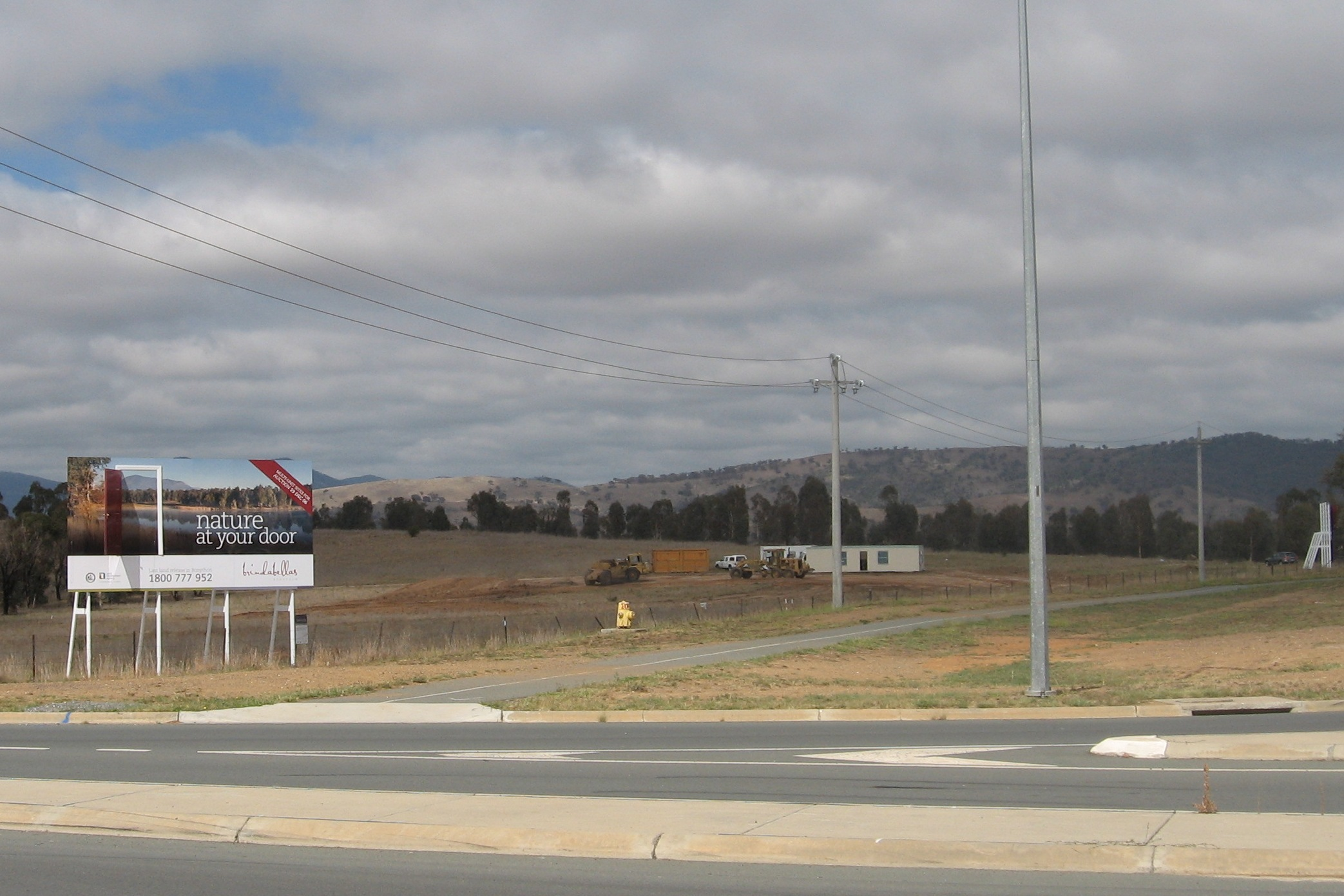
Work starting on Bonython West - January 2007

In 2007, the final release of residential land in Bonython began with the development of West Bonython, between the northern shore of Stranger Pond and Athllon Drive. The development was undertaken by the ACT Land Development Agency - this estate was initially promoted as 'Brindabellas', but that label was quietly dropped and the area is now simply part of Bonython. By June 2010, only one block of land had yet to be built on - this was one of the first blocks sold. Construction started on the "Montana" townhouse complex in December 2010 and the townhouses are now fully occupied.

An additional 800 residences were constructed between 2007 and 2010, comprising a mixture of apartments, units, courtyard homes and standalone residences.

Lower Stranger Pond was lengthened so that the eastern end now continues almost to Barr Smith Avenue.

Bonython is now a well established inner suburb of Tuggeranong, with mature trees. Improvements continue with bus shelters being erected on various main roads, and improved traffic safety features. The western side of Barr Smith Avenue was, for 20 years, without a footpath but is now mostly connected. The opening of the Caroline Chisholm Centre in March 2008 at Greenway has heightened the suburb's appeal as a residential location.

== Weather ==
Current weather conditions in Bonython are closely reflected by the Isabella Plains automatic weather station, which is only several hundred metres away from the eastern boundary of the suburb.

== Transport ==
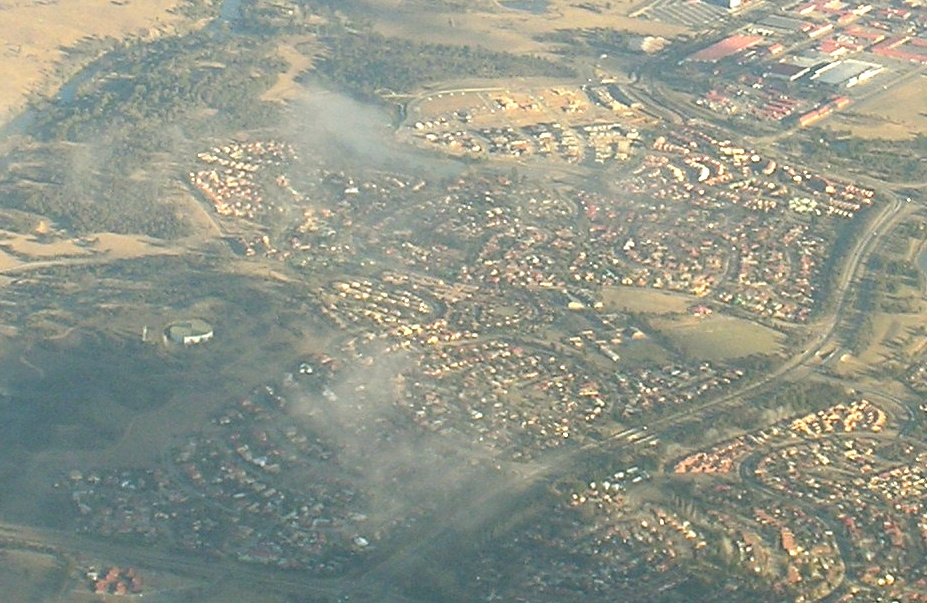
Aerial view from south east

ACTION Bus Services for Bonython are:

- 78: North to Tuggeranong Interchange, East to Chisholm via Isabella Plains and Richardson
- 81: North to Tuggeranong Interchange, South to Lanyon Marketplace via Gordon and Banks

A commute from Bonython to Civic (with a change at Tuggeranong interchange since April 2019) in morning peak hour traffic takes approximately 40–45 minutes.

== Geology ==
Deakin Volcanics green grey, purple and cream rhyolite form the base of Bonython and Mount Stranger.
