= Mary MacKillop College, Kensington =

Coordinates: 34°55′22″S 138°38′34″E

Mary MacKillop College
- Kensington, South Australia, Adelaide, South Australia; Australia

Information
- Type: Secondary college
- Motto: In Omnibus Caritas
- Denomination: Roman Catholic
- Established: 1944
- Principal: Sonia Nelson
- Website: www.marymackillop.sa.edu.au

Mary MacKillop College, formerly St Joseph's Higher Primary, then St Joseph's High School, is a Catholic girls' secondary school in the Adelaide suburb of Kensington, South Australia.

== History ==
The Sisters of St Joseph of the Sacred Heart began providing Catholic education in Kensington since 1872. The order was founded in 1866 by Mary MacKillop, who lived in the Kensington district for eleven years. Since then several sites in the area have been used as schools.

The current secondary college was founded in 1944, when 100 students from other schools run by the Josephite sisters were brought together under one roof in Queen Street, Norwood, in a school then named St Joseph's Higher Primary.

In 1950 the school moved to Bridge Street, Kensington, and a few years later the school expanded into a hired hall in High Street. New buildings were built in the present Phillips Street site, and in 1963 200 students moved into the renamed St Joseph's High School moved into the Phillips Street site with an enrolment of 200. Student numbers grew through the 1960s, and in 1970 the school was renamed to its present name.

Enrolments declined in the 2010s. In 2010 there were 537 students enrolled at the school. In 2015 there were 320.

== Description ==
Since 2011 and as of 2022 the principal of the school is Glasgow-born Kath McGuigan.

Mary MacKillop College educates students from Year 7 to Year 12. Middle school students (Years 7, 8 and 9) study compulsory courses across eight key learning areas. Senior students are allowed greater flexibility in their studies from Year 10 and undertake studies towards the South Australian Certificate of Education in Years 11 and 12. Senior students are also able to undertake Vocational Education and Training courses.

The school motto is "In Omnibus Caritas" (meaning "In all things love").

Mary MacKillop College is a member of the South Australian Catholic Girls Sports Association and the South Australian Secondary Sports Association, and students from the college participate in a variety of team and individual sporting competitions. Students are also able to participate in various cultural, liturgical and community activities.

== Notable alumni ==
- Claire Woods (aka Claire Tallent) – athlete, Australian representative to the 2012 Olympics in Athletics
- Jada Alberts – actress
