= Mary MacKillop College, Wakeley =

Mary MacKillop Catholic College

Location
- 5 Carnarvon Street, Wakeley, New South Wales; Australia; 33°52′34″S 150°54′44″E

Information
- Type: Independent single-sex secondary day school
- Religious affiliation: Sisters of St Joseph
- Denomination: Roman Catholic
- Patron saint: Saint Mary MacKillop
- Established: 1991; 35 years ago
- Educational authority: New South Wales Department of Education
- Oversight: Archdiocese of Sydney
- Principal: Gilda Pussich (2022)
- Staff: 122 (2021)
- Years: 7–12
- Gender: Girls
- Enrolment: 866 (2021) (1991)
- Colours: Maroon, pink, light blue and grey
- Website: mmcwakeley.syd.catholic.edu.au

Mary MacKillop Catholic College is an independent Catholic single-sex secondary day school for girls, located in the South-western Sydney suburb of Wakeley, New South Wales, Australia. The college provides a Catholic and general education to students covering Year 7 to Year 12 from the Smithfield, Fairfield, Cabramatta and Villawood parishes in the Fairfield area of Sydney.

== Overview ==
The school was founded as Rosary High School in 1946 in Fairfield, while the Sisters of St Joseph, a teaching order founded by Mary MacKillop, have been engaged in the area since 1931. In its current form the college was established in 1991, and was one of the newest schools in the Archdiocese of Sydney.

Mary MacKillop Catholic College emphasises community, and each of the school's houses – Marian, Joseph, Sippel, Tenison, McCormack and Mcaullife – are named after women the school sees as worthy role models for the students. To promote a sense of community across year groups, pastoral care groups incorporate students from Year 7 to Year 12. Mary MacKillop Catholic College offers core and elective courses for junior students and a range of NSW Higher School Certificate courses for senior students.

== See also ==
- List of Catholic schools in New South Wales
- Catholic education in Australia
