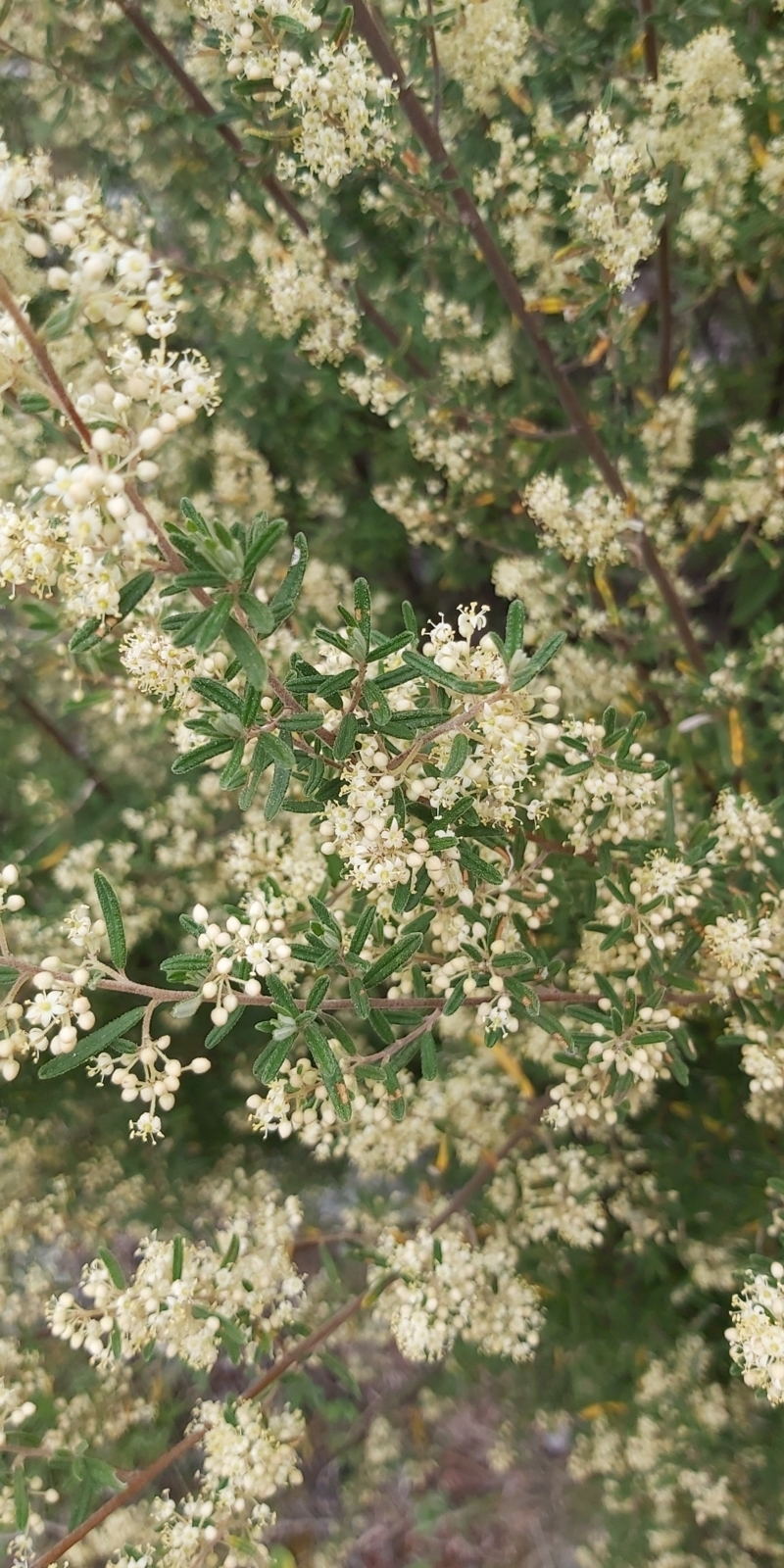
- On Tuggeranong Hill, A.C.T.

Scientific classification
- Kingdom: Plantae
- Clade: Tracheophytes
- Clade: Angiosperms
- Clade: Eudicots
- Clade: Rosids
- Order: Rosales
- Family: Rhamnaceae
- Genus: Pomaderris
- Species: P. angustifolia

Binomial name
- Pomaderris angustifolia N.A.Wakef.

= Pomaderris angustifolia =

Species of shrub

Pomaderris angustifolia is a species of flowering plant in the family Rhamnaceae and is endemic to south-eastern continental Australia. It is a shrub with linear to narrowly oblong leaves and cream-coloured or yellow flowers.

== Description ==
Pomaderris angustifolia is a shrub that typically grows to a height of 1–2 m (3 ft 3 in – 6 ft 7 in), its foliage covered with greyish, star-shaped hairs. The leaves are linear to narrowly oblong, mostly 7–15 mm (0.28–0.59 in) long and 1.0–2.5 mm (0.039–0.098 in) wide, with stipules 1–2 mm (0.039–0.079 in) long at the base but that soon fall off. The flowers are borne in clusters of two to twenty in leaf axils or on the end of branches and are cream-coloured or yellow, each flower on a pedicel 1–3 mm (0.039–0.118 in) long. The sepals are 1.5–1.8 mm (0.059–0.071 in) long, there are no petals and the style is branched. Flowering occurs from October to November.

== Taxonomy ==
Pomaderris angustifolia was first formally described in 1951 by Norman Arthur Wakefield in The Victorian Naturalist from specimens he collected near the "Upper Genoa River" in 1948. The specific epithet (angustifolia) means "narrow-leaved".

== Distribution and habitat ==
This pomaderris usually grows in rocky soils in gullies near watercourses and occurs in New South Wales on the ranges south from near Rylstone through the Australian Capital Territory to eastern Victoria as far west as Maffra.
