= Calwell, Australian Capital Territory =

Calwell
- Suburb
- Coordinates: 35°26′17″S 149°06′36″E
- Country: Australia
- State: Australian Capital Territory
- City: Canberra
- District: Tuggeranong
- Established: 1986

Government
  - Territory electorate: Brindabella
  - Federal division: Bean

Area
  - Total: 3.9 km^{2} (1.5 sq mi)

Population
  - Total: 5,730 (2021 census)
  - Density: 1,469/km^{2} (3,810/sq mi)
- Postcode: 2905
- Gazetted: 5 August 1975
Suburbs around Calwell
	Isabella Plains	Richardson
Bonython	Calwell
Gordon	Conder	Theodore

Calwell (/ˈkɔːlwɛl/) is a medium-sized suburb of Canberra, Australia in the district of Tuggeranong. Tuggeranong Hill is on its southern border and the Tuggeranong Homestead is to the north. Calwell is located close to the Monaro Highway which provides a direct route to Canberra City and to Cooma.

== History ==
The suburb was named after the Labor politician, Arthur Calwell (1896–1973). The suburb name was gazetted on 5 August 1975. Streets in the suburb are named for Victorian politicians. Outtrim Avenue between Johnson Drive and the Calwell Shopping Centre is named after Alfred Richard Outtrim who represented Maryborough from 1885 to 1920.

== Demographics ==
At the 2021 census, there were 5,730 people in Calwell.

- Aboriginal and Torres Strait Islander people made up 2.6% of the population.
- 78.3% of people were born in Australia. The next most common country of birth was England at 3.1%.
- 83.2% of people spoke only English at home.
- The most common responses for religion were No Religion 41.6%, Catholic 25.2% and Anglican 10.2%.

== Suburb amenities ==
=== Calwell Centre ===
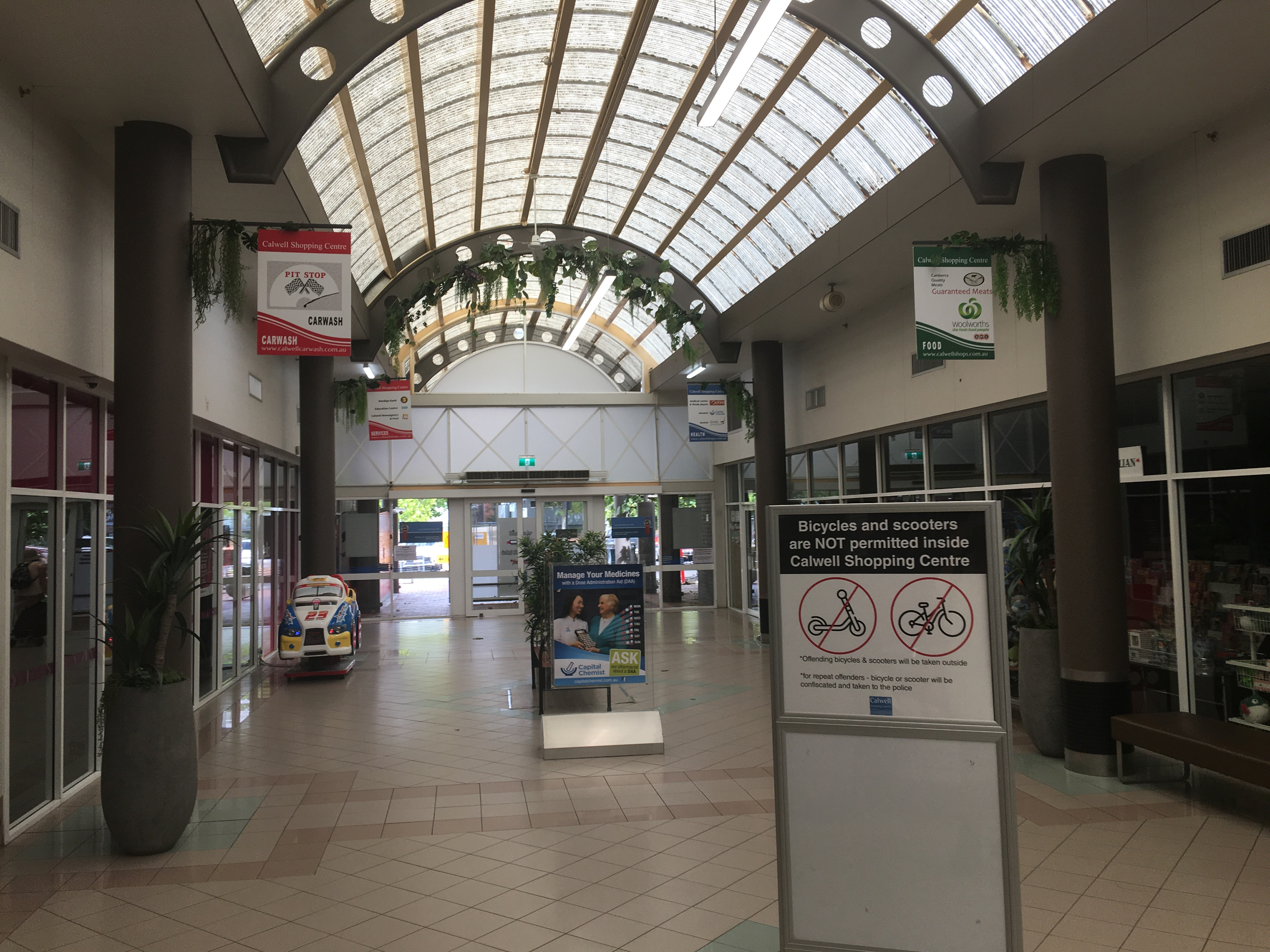
Inside the Calwell Shopping Centre

The Calwell Centre is a designated group centre located on Webber Crescent in the north of the suburb. The centre was developed in the early 1990s to serve Calwell, Richardson, Theodore and Isabella Plains. Prior to the development of the Lanyon Market Place in the late 1990s, the Calwell Centre also serviced Conder, Banks and Gordon.

=== Churches ===
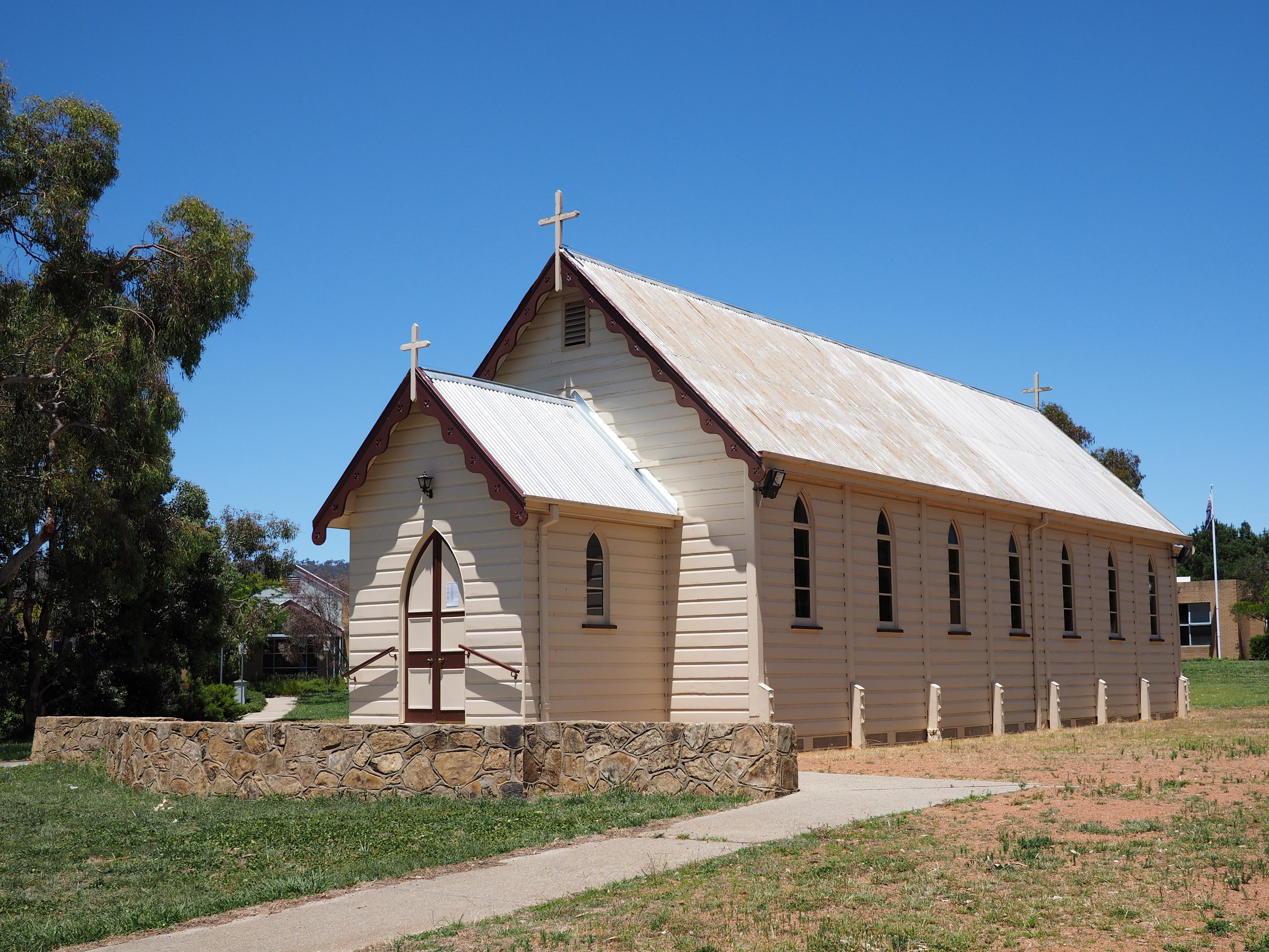
Sacred Heart Church in 2014

St Mary in the Valley Anglican Parish Centre is located on the corner of Were Street and Webber Crescent; in addition to Church services the Parish also manages the Calwell Community Centre. Alliance Church Tuggeranong is also located on Were Street. Corpus Christi Catholic Parish, based in Gowrie, runs services in the hall at St Francis of Assisi Primary School. The historic Sacred Heart Church was relocated to Calwell in 1988, and is used for special occasions.

== Education ==
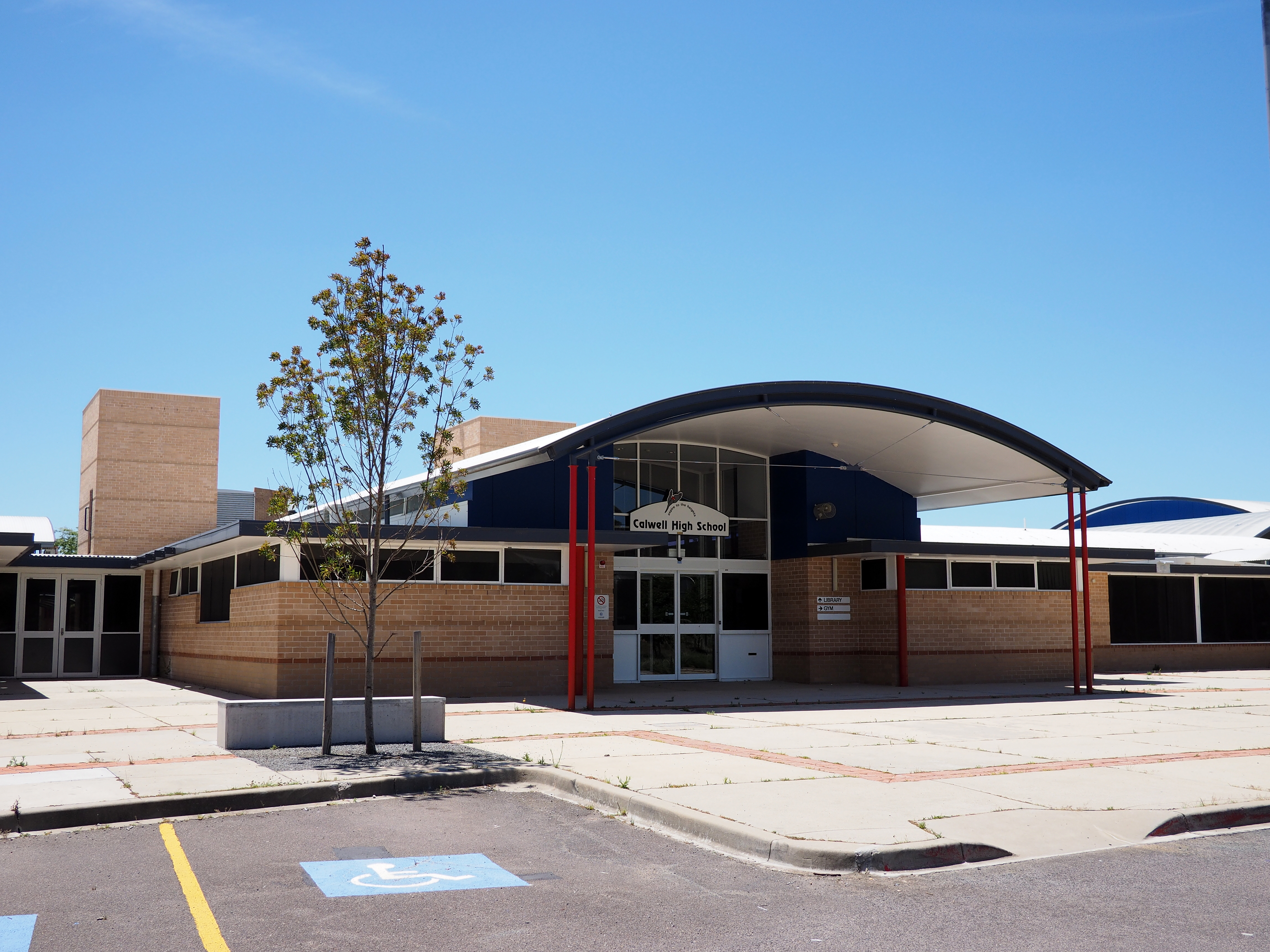
Calwell High School

=== Government schools ===
- Calwell High School, located on Casey Crescent, opened in 1990 and caters for students in Years 7 to 10.
- Calwell Primary School, located on Downard Street, opened in 1989 and caters for students from Preschool to Year 6.
- St Francis of Assisi School, located on Casey Crescent, opened in 1988 and caters for students from Kindergarten to Year 6

=== Non-government schools ===
- St Francis of Assisi Primary School, located on Casey Crescent, is a Catholic school that began operating from Holy Family School, Gowrie in 1988 and caters for students in Kindergarten to Year 6.

== Transport ==
Calwell is serviced by several ACTION bus routes.

- R5: Travels through Outtrim Avenue and Calwell Centre. South to Lanyon Marketplace, North to City Interchange via Woden Interchange
- 76: Travels via Wanniassa, Gowrie, Chisholm and Richardson. Terminates at Calwell Centre, North to Tuggeranong
- 79: Travels through Duggan Street, Were St., Casey Cres and Calwell Centre, as well as the neighbouring suburb of Theodore. South to Tuggeranong Interchange, Terminates at Calwell Centre
- 182: (Peak Hour only) South to Lanyon Marketplace, North to City Interchange via Monaro Highway (Monday-Friday only)

All Canberra taxi companies and Queanbeyan taxis also service Calwell.

== Geology ==
Deakin Volcanics green grey and purple rhyodacite of Silurian age form the base rock of Calwell.
