= Conder, Australian Capital Territory =

Conder
- Suburb
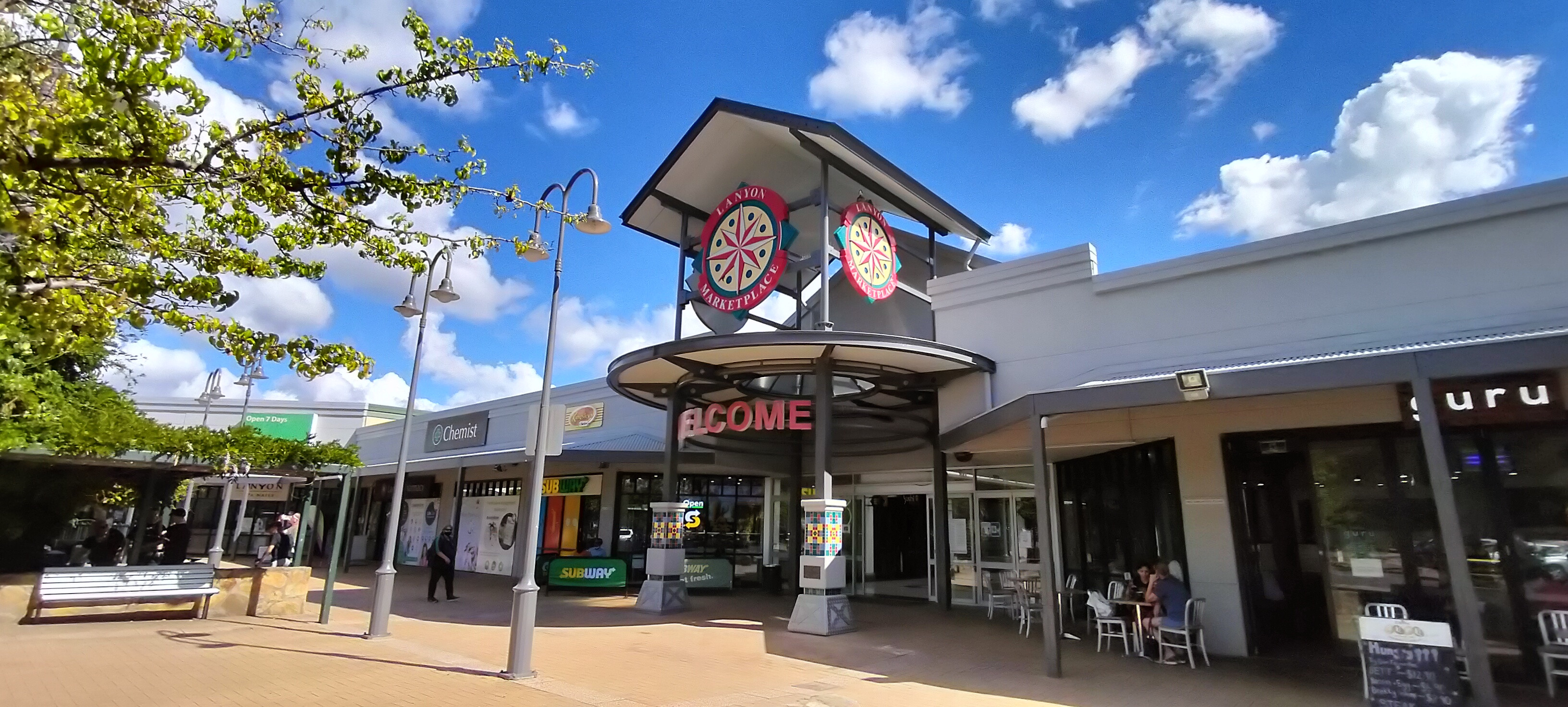
- Lanyon Marketplace in Conder

- Coordinates: 35°27′29″S 149°05′49″E
- Country: Australia
- State: Australian Capital Territory
- City: Canberra
- District: Tuggeranong
- Established: 1991

Government
  - Territory electorate: Brindabella
  - Federal division: Bean

Area
  - Total: 4.5 km^{2} (1.7 sq mi)

Population
  - Total: 5,108 (SAL 2021)
- Postcode: 2906
- Gazetted: 12 March 1987
Suburbs around Conder
Gordon	Calwell	Theodore
Gordon	Conder	Nature Reserve
Gordon	Banks	Nature Reserve

Conder is one of three suburbs in the Lanyon Valley in Canberra, Australia. It lies in the district of Tuggeranong. The three suburbs are presently (as of 2011) the southernmost suburbs of the city, although the small settlement of Tharwa exists only a short distance further south.

Named after artist Charles Conder, the suburb of Conder extends from the slopes of Tuggeranong Hill to the valley floor. Conder is home to the valley's main services including the Lanyon Market Place, Lanyon High School and one of the four Vikings clubs in Canberra. Also included in the suburb are St Clare of Assisi Primary School, Charles Conder Primary School, a youth centre, child care centre and a family services centre.

Just like the name of the suburb, the streets of Conder are named after artists, including members of the Heidelberg School and places associated with that school. Among those recognised are Russell Drysdale and Tom Roberts.

Major developments in Conder including "Eastern Valley Rise" and "The Landscape" have seen the Lanyon Valley's population grow rapidly. Conder has come out on top with the highest median house price growth year-on-year out of all Canberra suburbs.

== Geology ==
Quaternary Alluvium covers the whole suburb. Underneath the alluvium and on the surrounding hills are Deakin Volcanics erupted during the Silurian age at 414 Mya. These include ignimbrite and tuff

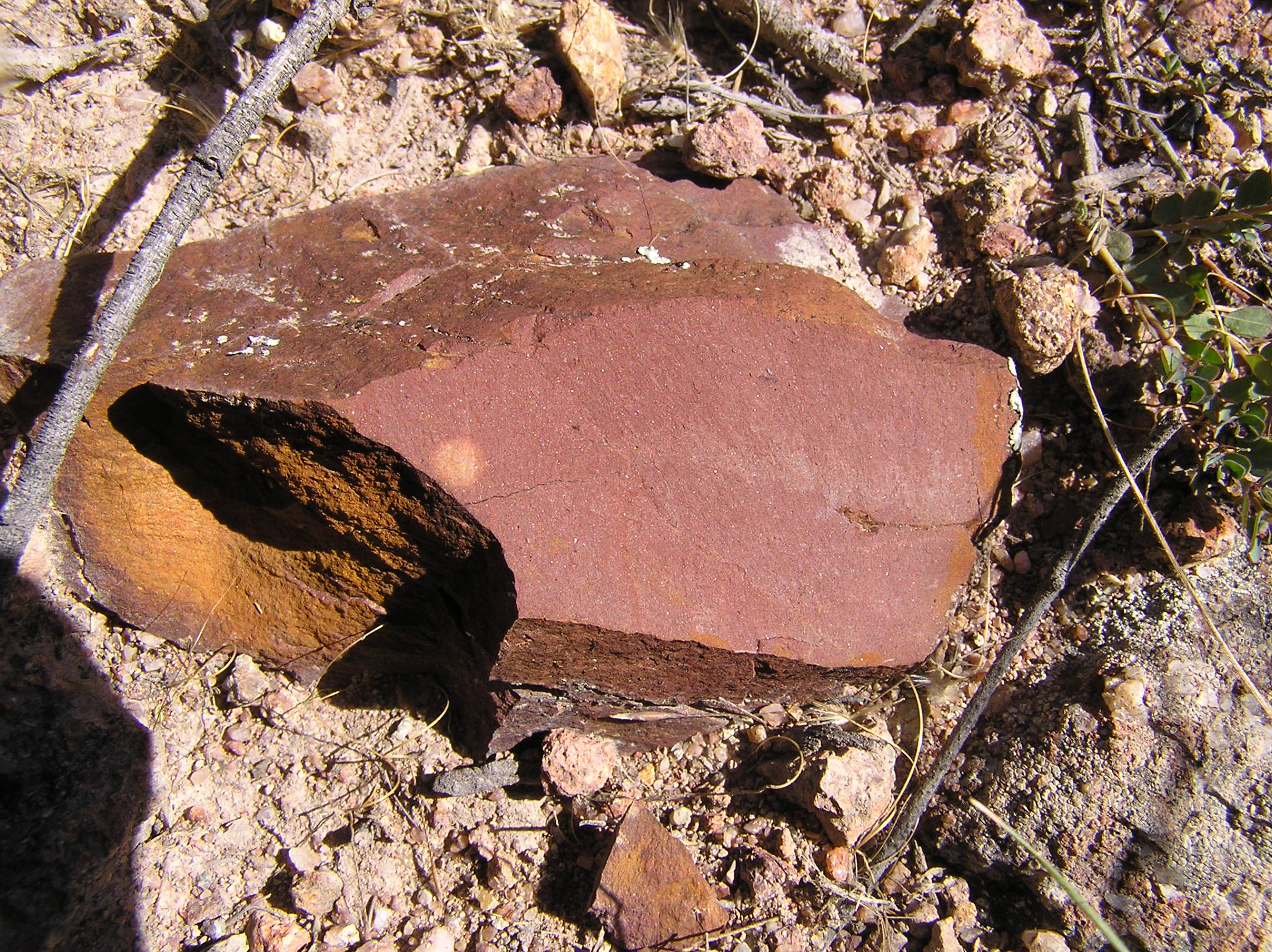
Red tuff from Tuggeranong Hill

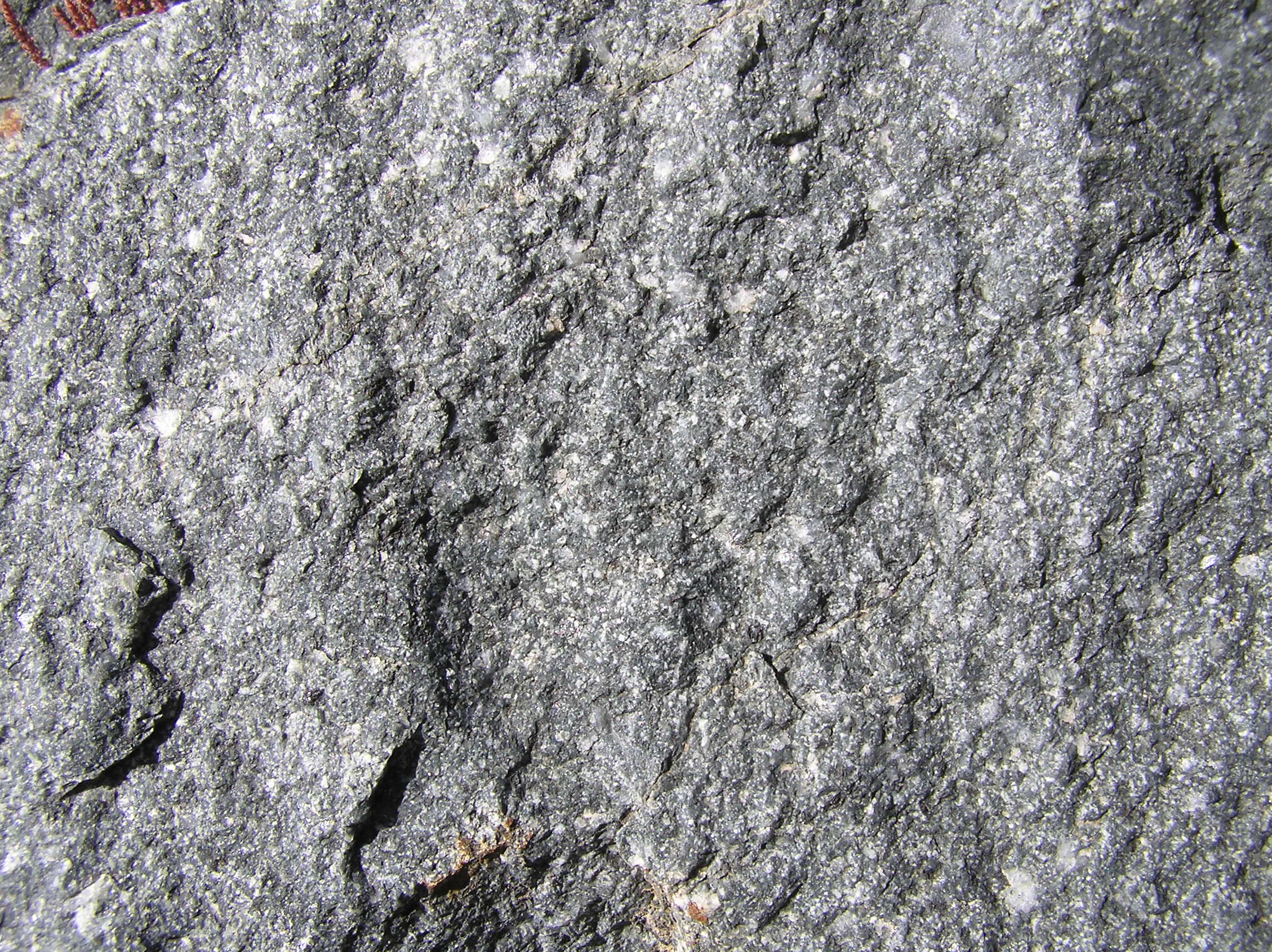
Ignimbrite from Tuggeranong Hill

== Gallery ==
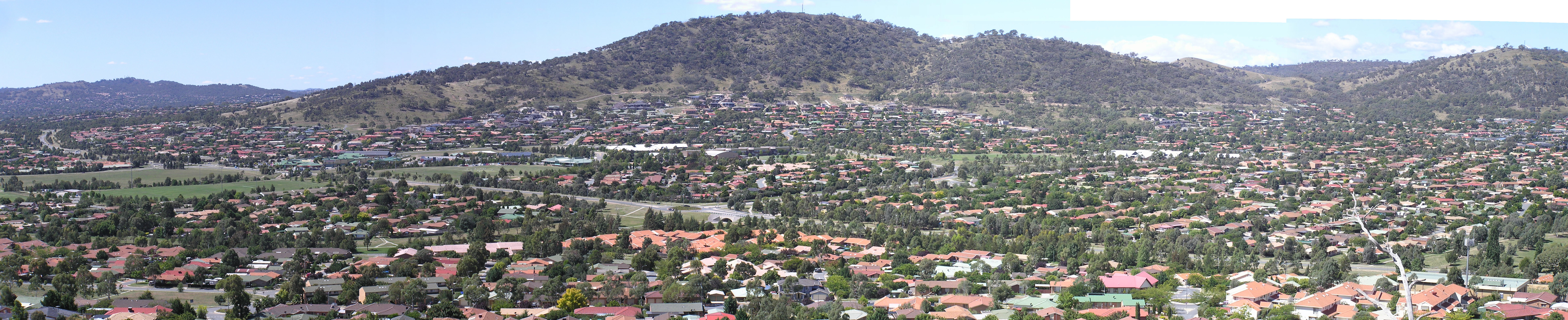
Panorama of Conder and the Lanyon Valley

View of Lanyon Valley with the Brindabella Ranges in the distance

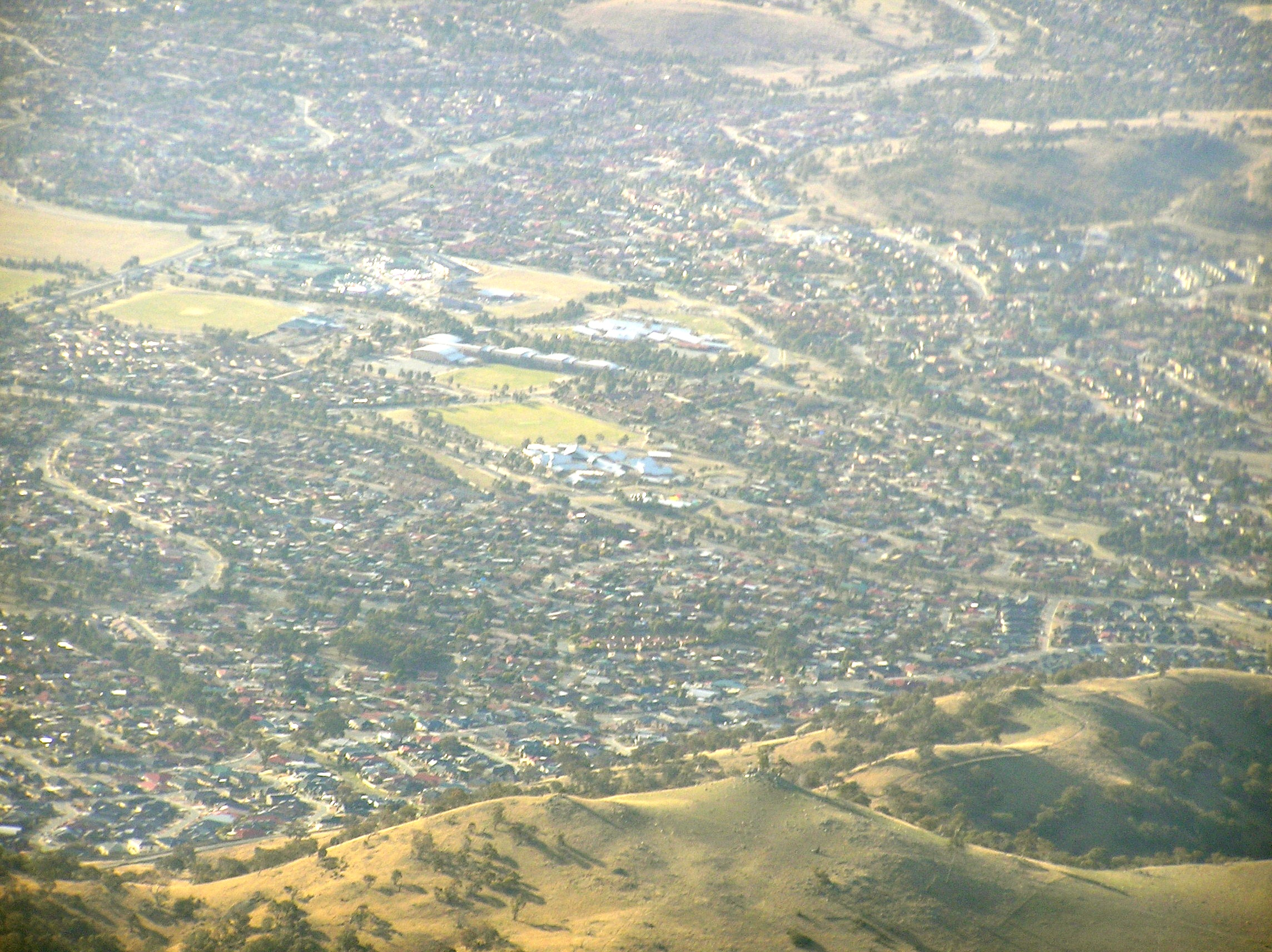
Aerial photo of Conder

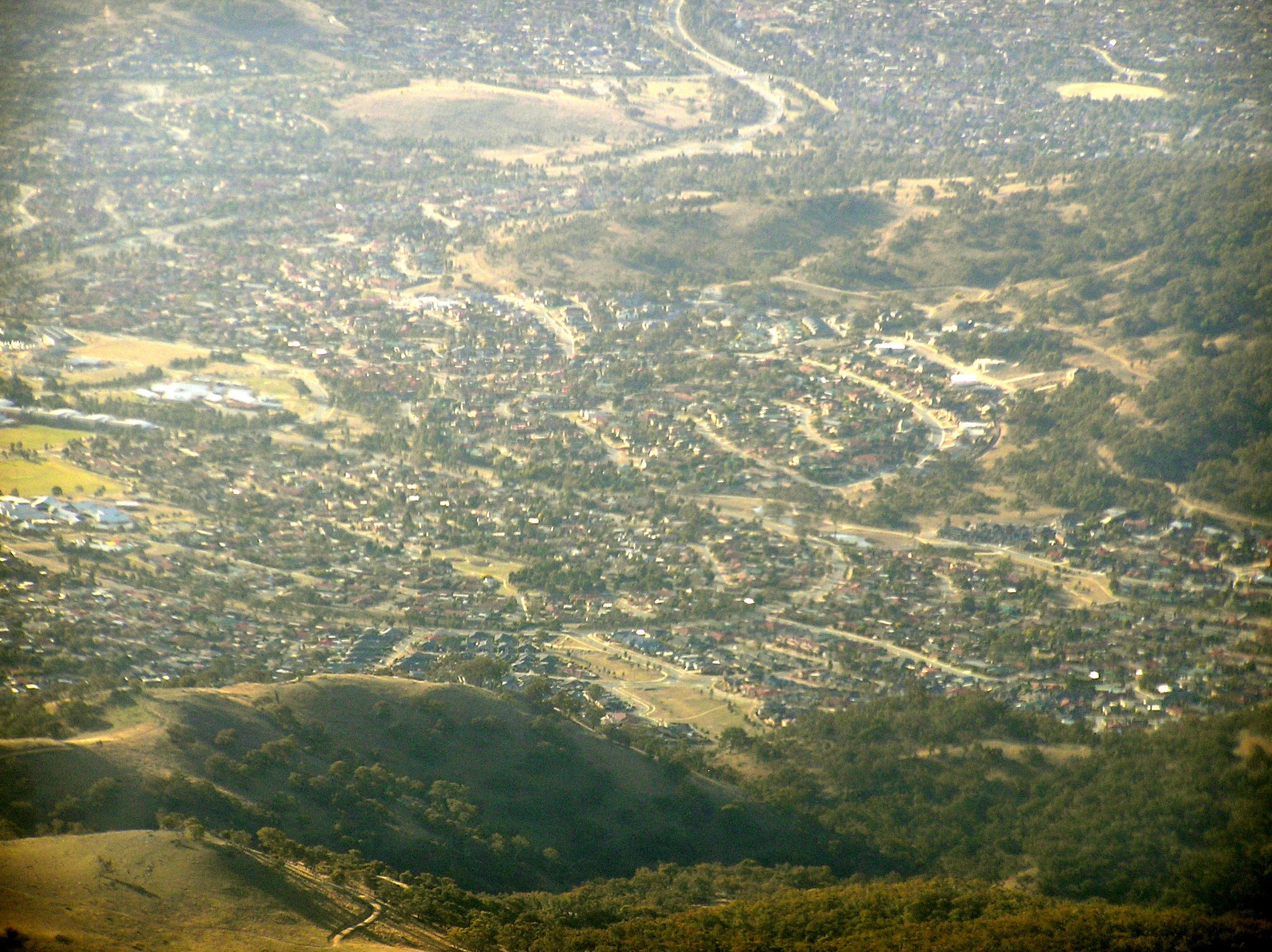
Aerial photo of eastern Conder nestled in the hills

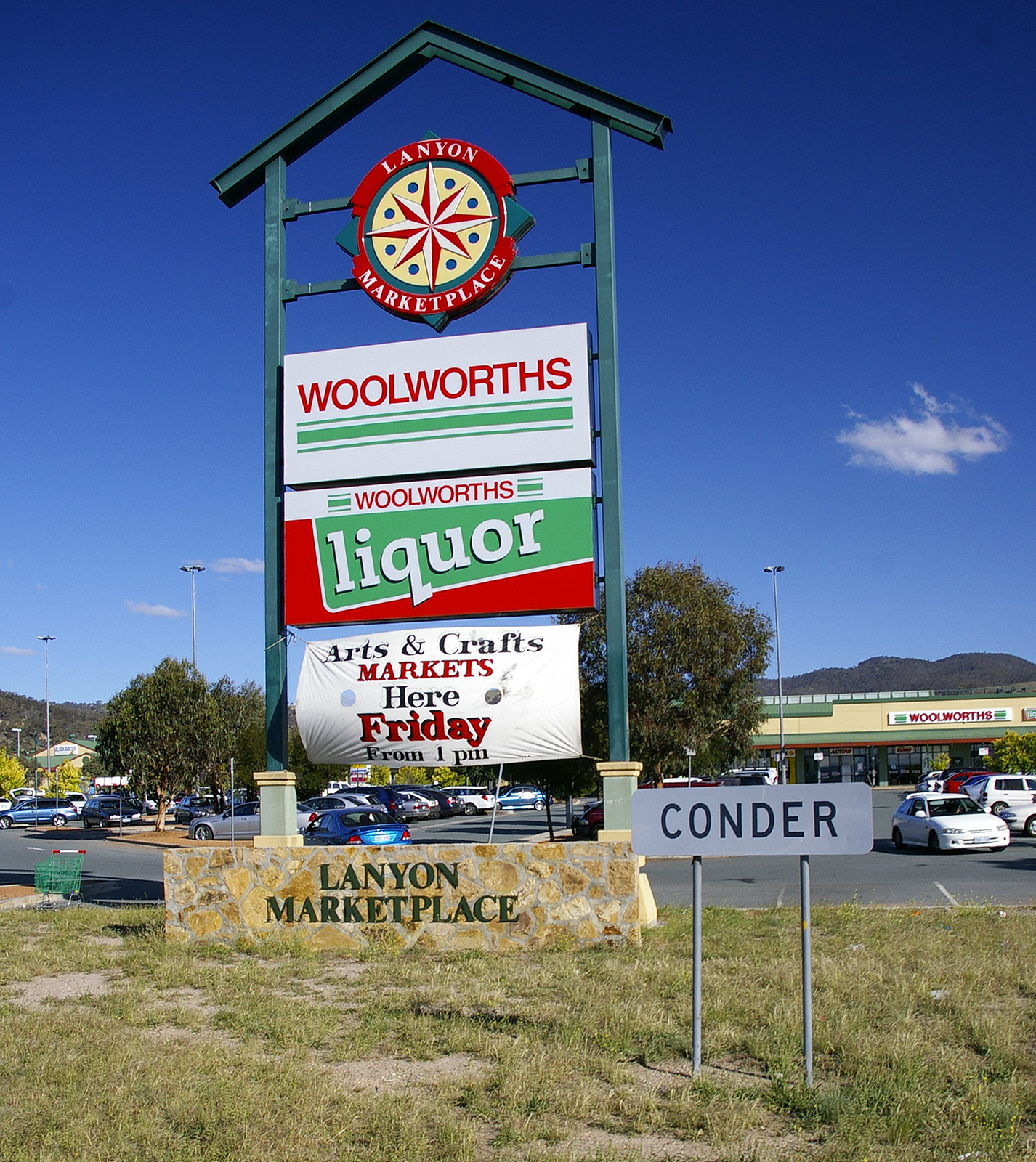
Lanyon Marketplace in January 2009

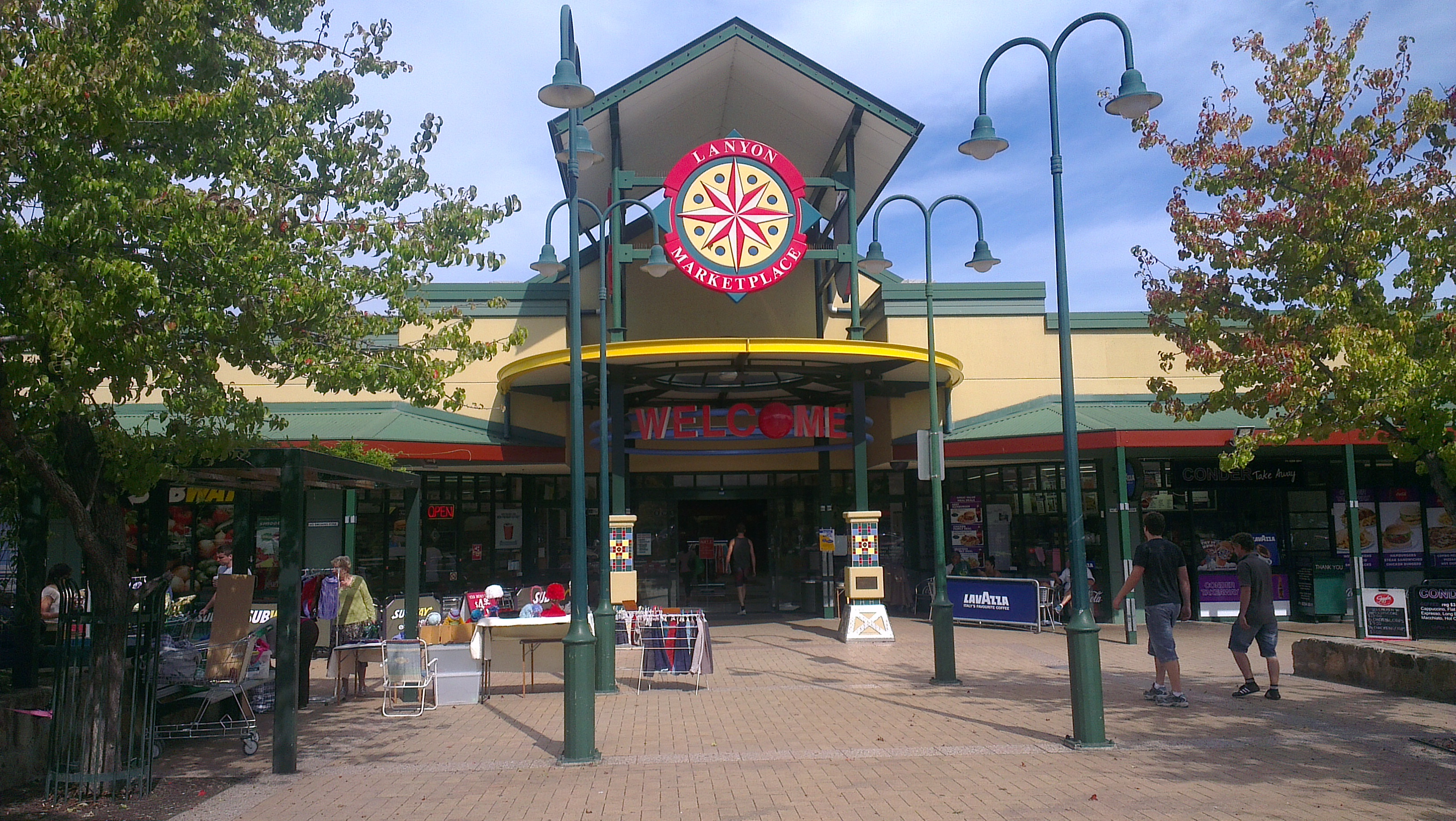
The Lanyon Marketplace entry
