= Gordon Primary School =

Gordon Primary School may refer to:

- Gordon Primary School in Gordon, Australian Capital Territory
- Gordon Primary School in Huntly, Aberdeenshire, Scotland
