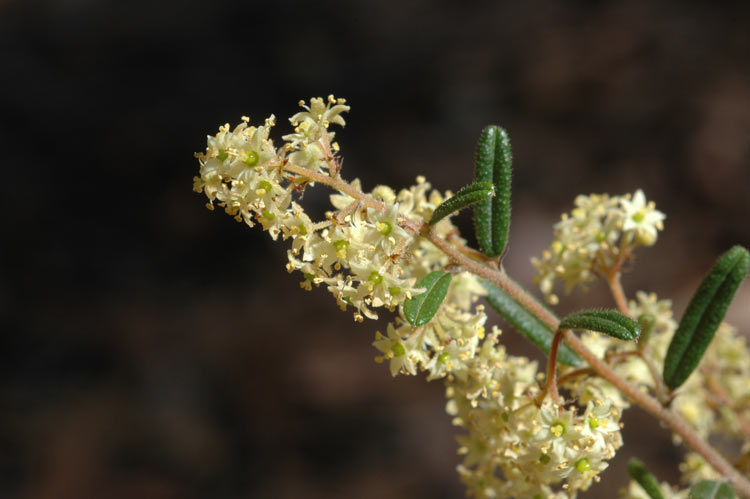
- Pomaderris helianthemifolia var. hispida in the ANBG

Scientific classification
- Kingdom: Plantae
- Clade: Tracheophytes
- Clade: Angiosperms
- Clade: Eudicots
- Clade: Rosids
- Order: Rosales
- Family: Rhamnaceae
- Genus: Pomaderris
- Species: P. helianthemifolia

Binomial name
- Pomaderris helianthemifolia (Reissek) N.A.Wakef.

= Pomaderris helianthemifolia =

Species of shrub

Pomaderris helianthemifolia is a species of flowering plant in the family Rhamnaceae and is endemic to south-eastern continental Australia. It is a bushy shrub with hairy young stems, narrowly elliptic to lance-shaped leaves with the narrower end towards the base, and small panicles of hairy yellowish flowers.

== Description ==
Pomaderris helianthemifolia is a bushy shrub that typically grows to a height of 1–2 m (3 ft 3 in – 6 ft 7 in), its stems covered with greyish to rust-coloured, star-shaped hairs. The leaves are narrowly elliptic to lance-shaped or oblong, 5–20 mm (0.20–0.79 in) long and 2–3 mm (0.079–0.118 in) wide with stipules 1–2.5 mm (0.039–0.098 in) long at the base but that fall off as the leaf develops. The upper surface of the leaves glabrous and the lower surface is densely covered with soft, greyish, star-shaped hairs. The flowers are borne in panicles 20–50 mm (0.79–1.97 in) of about twenty to fifty and are yellowish. The sepals are 1.5–2.0 mm (0.059–0.079 in) long but fall of as the flowers mature and there are no petals.

== Taxonomy ==
This species was first formally described in 1858 by Siegfried Reissek who gave it the name Trymalium helianthemifolium in Linnaea: ein Journal für die Botanik in ihrem ganzen Umfange, oder Beiträge zur Pflanzenkunde, from specimens collected by Ferdinand von Mueller in "Gipps Land". In 1951, Norman Arthur Wakefield changed the name to Pomaderris helianthemifolia in The Victorian Naturalist.

In 1997, Neville Grant Walsh and F. Coates described two subspecies in the journal Muelleria, and the names and those of the autonym are accepted by the Australian Plant Census:

- Pomaderris helianthemifolia (Reissek) N.A.Wakef. subsp. helianthemifolia (the autonym);
- Pomaderris helianthemifolia subsp. hispida N.G.Walsh & Coates has leaves 10–45 mm (0.39–1.77 in) long with stiff bristles or hairs on the upper surface;
- Pomaderris helianthemifolia subsp. minor N.G.Walsh & Coates has leaves 5–9 mm (0.20–0.35 in) long with stiff bristles or hairs on the upper surface.

== Distribution and habitat ==
This pomaderris usually grows on the banks of rocky streams. Subspecies helianthemifolia is only known from two restricted areas in Gippsland, in the Maffra-Briagolong area and near the Genoa River. Subspecies hispida is widespread, but not common in a few locations in New South Wales and in north-eastern Victoria and subspecies minor is found in north-eastern Victoria, but no longer occurs near Bendigo.
