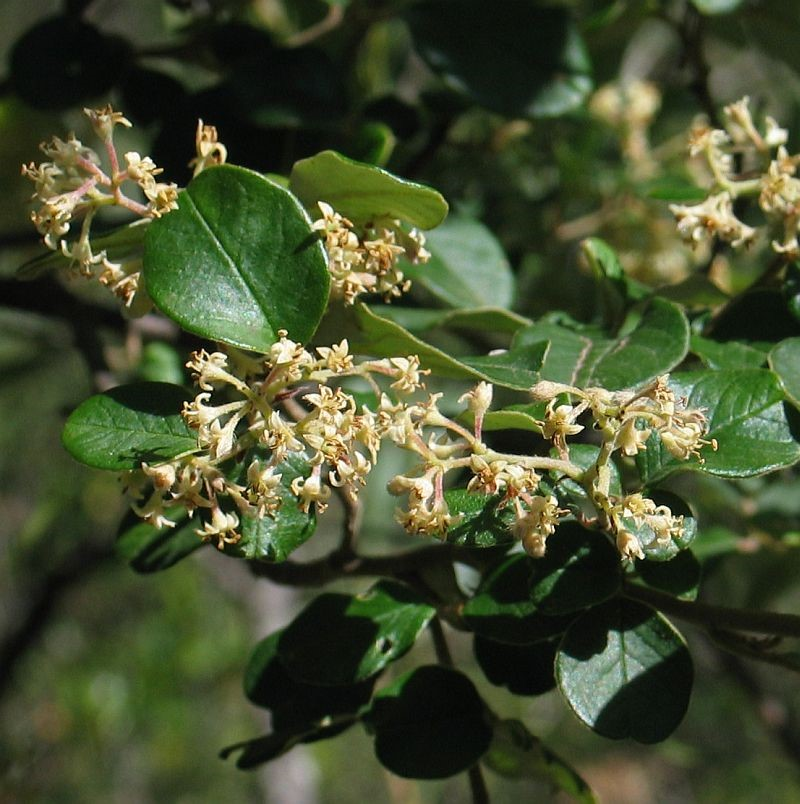
- Pomaderris cotoneaster in the Bungonia State Conservation Area

Conservation status
- Endangered (EPBC Act)

Scientific classification
- Kingdom: Plantae
- Clade: Tracheophytes
- Clade: Angiosperms
- Clade: Eudicots
- Clade: Rosids
- Order: Rosales
- Family: Rhamnaceae
- Genus: Pomaderris
- Species: P. cotoneaster

Binomial name
- Pomaderris cotoneaster N.A.Wakef.

= Pomaderris cotoneaster =

Cotoneaster pomaderris

Species of flowering plant

Pomaderris cotoneaster, commonly known as cotoneaster pomaderris, is a species of flowering plant in the family Rhamnaceae and is endemic to south-eastern continental Australia. It is an erect shrub with woolly-hairy stems, elliptic leaves, and leafy panicles of cream-coloured flowers.

== Description ==
Pomaderris cotoneaster is an erect shrub that typically grows to a height of 1–4 m (3 ft 3 in – 13 ft 1 in), its branchlets densely covered with woolly, white, star-shaped hairs. The leaves are egg-shaped to elliptic, 15–30 mm (0.59–1.18 in) long and 10–15 mm (0.39–0.59 in) wide, the upper surface with bristly hairs and the lower surface densely covered with soft, star-shaped, white and rust-coloured hairs. The flowers are cream-coloured and borne in leafy, more or less pyramid-shaped panicles 30–100 mm (1.2–3.9 in) long, each flower on a pedicel 1.5–2.5 mm (0.059–0.098 in) long. The floral cup is 0.5–1.0 mm (0.020–0.039 in) long, the sepals 1.6–2.0 mm (0.063–0.079 in) long but fall off as the flowers open, and there are no petals. Flowering occurs in October and November.

== Taxonomy ==
Pomaderris cotoneaster was first formally described in 1951 by Norman Arthur Wakefield in The Victorian Naturalist from specimens he collected near the Upper Genoa River in 1950. The specific epithet (cotoneaster) means "quince-likeness".

== Distribution and habitat ==
This pomaderris grows in forest and woodland, often along rivers or on cliffs and is found from near Mittagong in New South Wales to the upper Genoa River in far north-east Victoria, but is rare in both states.

== Conservation status ==
Cotoneaster pomaderris is listed as "endangered" under the Australian Government Environment Protection and Biodiversity Conservation Act 1999, the Victorian Government Flora and Fauna Guarantee Act 1988 and the New South Wales Government Biodiversity Conservation Act 2016. The main threats to the species include climate change, grazing by herbivores, and weed invasion.
