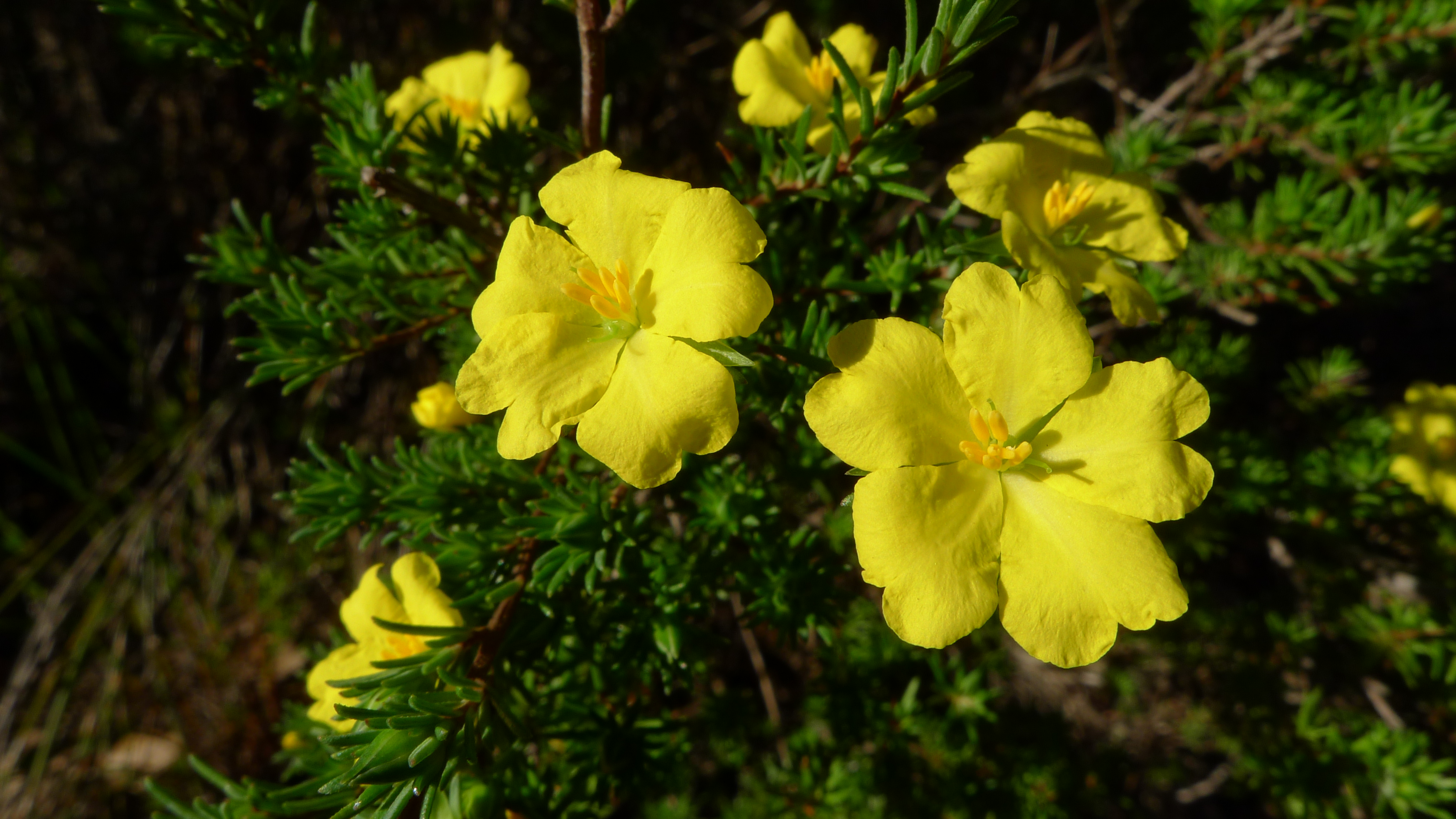
- Subspecies cistiflora in Heathcote National Park

Scientific classification
- Kingdom: Plantae
- Clade: Tracheophytes
- Clade: Angiosperms
- Clade: Eudicots
- Order: Dilleniales
- Family: Dilleniaceae
- Genus: Hibbertia
- Species: H. cistiflora

Binomial name
- Hibbertia cistiflora N.A.Wakef.

Synonyms
- Pleurandra cistiflora Rchb.; Pleurandra cistiflora Sieber ex Spreng. nom. illeg.; Hibbertia stricta var. glabriuscula auct. non Benth.: Bentham, G. (1863)

= Hibbertia cistiflora =

Species of flowering plant

Hibbertia cistiflora is a species of flowering plant in the family Dilleniaceae and is endemic to south-eastern continental Australia. It is a small, erect to low-lying shrub with linear to lance-shaped leaves and yellow flowers usually with four or six stamens arranged in a single cluster.

== Description ==
Hibbertia cistiflora is an erect to low-lying shrub that typically grows to a height of 30 cm (12 in) and has wiry branches. The leaves are linear to lance-shaped, 4–10 mm (0.16–0.39 in) long and 0.8–1.2 mm (0.031–0.047 in) wide on a petiole 0.2–1 mm (0.0079–0.0394 in) long. The flowers are arranged singly on the ends of branchlets and are sessile and there are usually three or four triangular bracts 1.0–1.3 mm (0.039–0.051 in) long. The sepals are joined at the base, the outer lobes oblong, 4.5–5.1 mm (0.18–0.20 in) long, the inner lobes egg-shaped and 4.2–4.5 mm (0.17–0.18 in) long. The petals are yellow, broadly egg-shaped with the narrower end towards the base, 4.5–12.4 mm (0.18–0.49 in) long with two lobes. There are usually four or six stamens in a single cluster on one side of the glabrous carpels.

== Taxonomy ==
This species was described in 1826 by Kurt Polycarp Joachim Sprengel in Systema Vegetabilium and given the name Pleurandra cistiflora from an unpublished description by Franz Sieber, but the name was illegitimate because it had already been used by Ludwig Reichenbach for a different species. In 1956, Norman Wakefield changed the name to Hibbertia cistiflora in The Victorian Naturalist.

In 1995, Hellmut R. Toelken described two subspecies, cistiflora and rostrata and in 2012, a third - subsp. quadristaminea. All three were published in the Journal of the Adelaide Botanic Gardens and are accepted by the Australian Plant Census:

- Hibbertia cistiflora N.A.Wakef. subsp. cistiflora has flowers with six stamens and leaves with scattered tubercles and a central vein not protruding and the tip of the leaf, flowering mainly from August to October;
- Hibbertia cistiflora subsp. quadristaminea Toelken has flowers with four, sometimes five stamens, and leaves with few tubercles and a central vein that does not protrude at the tip of the leaf, flowering from August to October;
- Hibbertia cistiflora subsp. rostrata Toelken has six stamens and a central vein that protrudes up to 0.6 mm (0.024 in) beyond the tip of the leaf, flowering mainly from September to November.

== Distribution and habitat ==
Subspecies cistiflora is widespread in the Sydney district and the Blue Mountains where it grows in heath, but has been recorded as far north as Werrikimbe National Park and from Braidwood to Nerriga in the south of New South Wales. Subspecies rostrata grows in heath on or near the tops of ridges in the Grampians of Victoria. Subspecies quadristaminea is found in low heath on the Central Tablelands of New South Wales.
