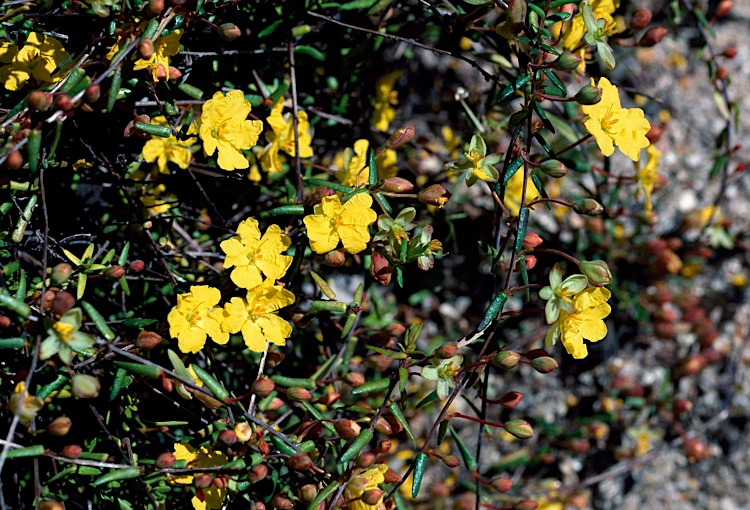
- Hibbertia rufa in the ANBG

Scientific classification
- Kingdom: Plantae
- Clade: Tracheophytes
- Clade: Angiosperms
- Clade: Eudicots
- Order: Dilleniales
- Family: Dilleniaceae
- Genus: Hibbertia
- Species: H. rufa

Binomial name
- Hibbertia rufa N.A.Wakef.

Synonyms
- Hibbertia stricta var. pedunculata Maiden & Betche

= Hibbertia rufa =

Brown guinea flower

Species of flowering plant

Hibbertia rufa, commonly known as brown guinea flower, is a species of flowering plant in the family Dilleniaceae and is endemic to south-eastern Australia. It is a weak, prostrate to scrambling shrub with wiry branches, linear leaves and yellow flowers with three or four stamens arranged in a cluster on one side of the two carpels.

== Description ==
Hibbertia rufa is a weak, prostrate to scrambling shrub with wiry branches that sometimes form adventitious roots. The leaves are linear to lance-shaped, 3.1–8 mm (0.12–0.31 in) long and 0.8–1.4 mm (0.031–0.055 in) wide on a petiole 0.2–0.54 mm (0.0079–0.0213 in) long. The edges of the leaves are rolled under and there is a tuft of hairs on the tip. The flowers are arranged on the ends of short side-shoots on a peduncle 5–15 mm (0.20–0.59 in) long, with linear to triangular bracts 0.5–1.4 mm (0.020–0.055 in) long at the base. The sepals are joined at the base, the outer lobes 3.0–4.5 mm (0.12–0.18 in) long and the inner lobes longer and broader. The petals are yellow, egg-shaped with the narrower end towards the base, 5.5–7.0 mm (0.22–0.28 in) long with a deep notch at the tip. There are three or four stamens in a single cluster on one side of the two glabrous carpels, each with four ovules.

== Taxonomy ==
Hibbertia rufa was first formally described in 1955 by Norman Arthur Wakefield in The Victorian Naturalist from specimens collected near the Cann River in 1948.

== Distribution and habitat ==
This hibbertia mainly grows on the edges of swamps and in wet heathland in scattered locations on the coast and tablelands of New South Wales, in far eastern Victoria and near St Helens in north-eastern Tasmania.

== Conservation status ==
Hibbertia rufa is classified as "rare" under the Tasmanian Government Threatened Species Protection Act 1995.
