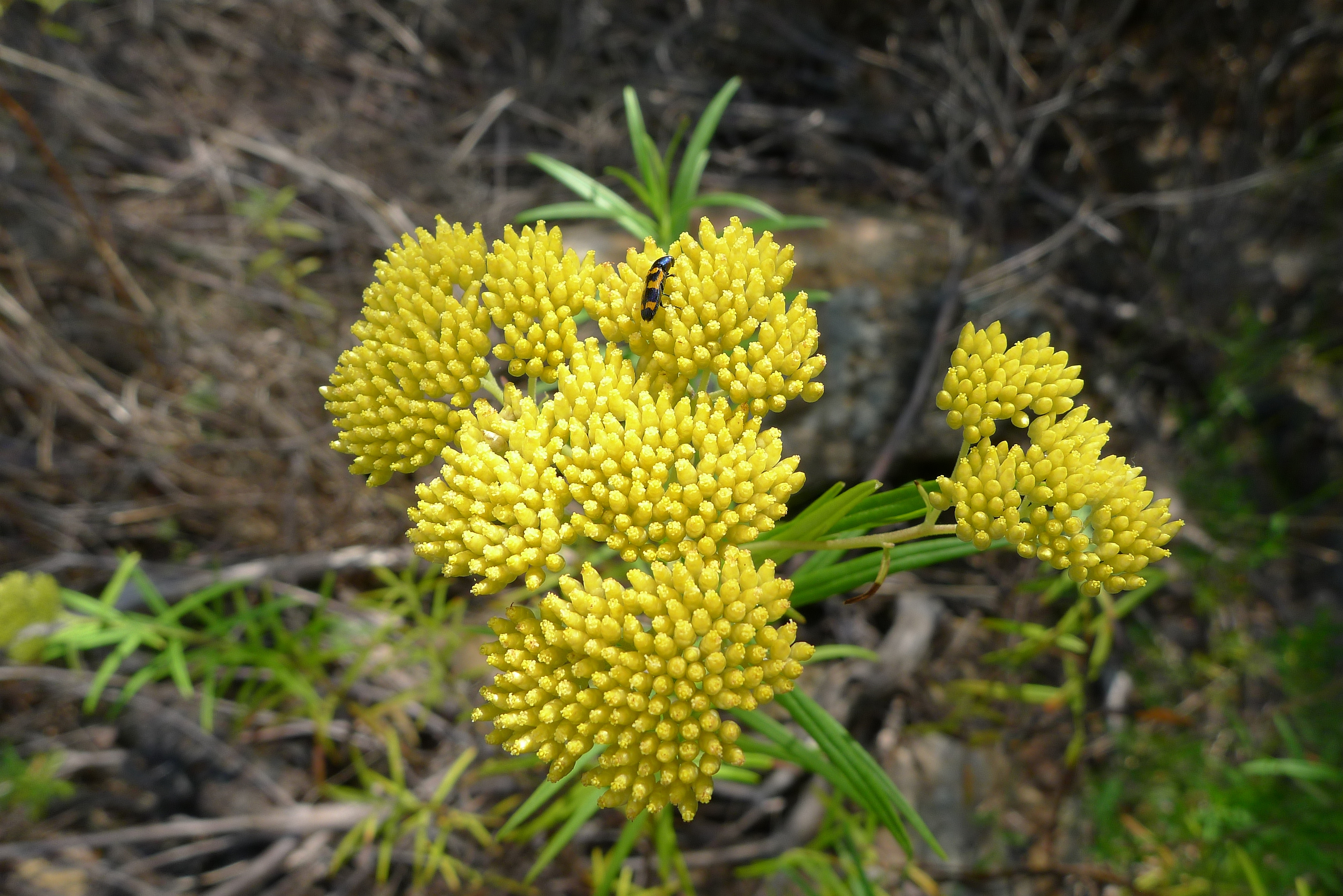
- Cassinia aureonitens in the Royal National Park

Scientific classification
- Kingdom: Plantae
- Clade: Tracheophytes
- Clade: Angiosperms
- Clade: Eudicots
- Clade: Asterids
- Order: Asterales
- Family: Asteraceae
- Genus: Cassinia
- Species: C. aureonitens

Binomial name
- Cassinia aureonitens N.A.Wakef.

Synonyms
- Cassinia aurea R.Br. nom. illeg.; Chromochiton aurea B.D.Jacks. nom. inval., pro syn.

= Cassinia aureonitens =

Yellow cassinia

Species of flowering plant

Cassinia aureonitens, commonly known as the yellow cassinia is a species of flowering plant in the family Asteraceae and is endemic to eastern New South Wales. It is a shrub with elliptic leaves and heads of yellow flowers arranged in dense corymbs.

== Description ==
Cassinia aureonitens is a shrub that typically grows to a height of 2–3 m (6 ft 7 in – 9 ft 10 in), its branches covered with glandular hairs. The leaves are elliptic, 30–70 mm (1.2–2.8 in) long and 2–5 mm (0.079–0.197 in) wide, dark green on the upper surface and paler below. The flower heads are 1–3 mm (0.039–0.118 in) long and about 1 mm (0.039 in) in diameter, each with five or six yellow florets surrounded by four or five overlapping whorls of involucral bracts. The heads are arranged in a dense corymb up to 120 mm (4.7 in) in diameter. Flowering occurs in spring and summer and the achenes are about 0.5 mm (0.020 in) long with a pappus about 2 mm (0.079 in) long.

== Taxonomy ==
Yellow cassinia was first formally described in 1818 by Robert Brown and given the name Cassinia aurea in the Transactions of the Linnean Society of London, but the name was illegitimate because Brown had used the same name in 1813 for a different species now known as Angianthus tomentosus. In 1951 Norman Arthur Wakefield designated the name Cassinia aureonitens for this species, publishing the new name in The Victorian Naturalist.

== Distribution and habitat ==
Cassinia aureonitens grows in heath and woodland on the coast of New South Wales between Taree and Eden and inland to the Central Tablelands.
