= Lanyon Valley =

Coordinates: 35.460°S 149.094°E

Lanyon Valley (/ˈlænjən/) is a district located at the southeast end of Canberra, Australia, including the suburbs of Gordon, Conder, and Banks.

== Region ==
The Lanyon Valley is a small community containing five schools: Lanyon High School, Covenant College, Conder Primary School, Gordon Primary School, and St. Clare of Assisi. Lanyon Valley contains three shopping facilities, Lanyon Shopping Centre being the main with more than 20 shopping facilities including a Woolworth's, McDonald's, Subway, Kingsleys; also two Asian restaurants, two takeaways, and chemist, newsagents, butchers, and local and Woolworth liquor. The two other shopping facilities are Banks Shops located on Pocket Avenue and Gordon Shopping Centre located on Lewis Luxton avenue of Woodcock Drive.

Suburbs include:

- Gordon
- Conder
- Banks
