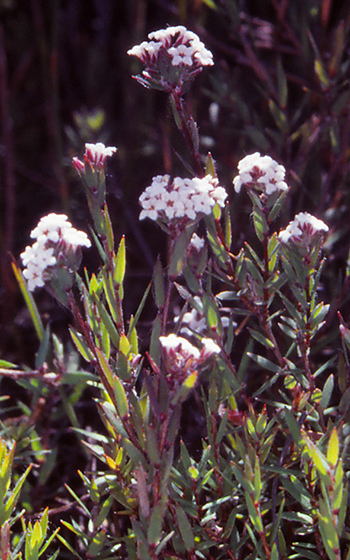
- In the South East Forests National Park

Scientific classification
- Kingdom: Plantae
- Clade: Tracheophytes
- Clade: Angiosperms
- Clade: Eudicots
- Clade: Asterids
- Order: Ericales
- Family: Ericaceae
- Genus: Leucopogon
- Species: L. pilifer

Binomial name
- Leucopogon pilifer N.A.Wakef.
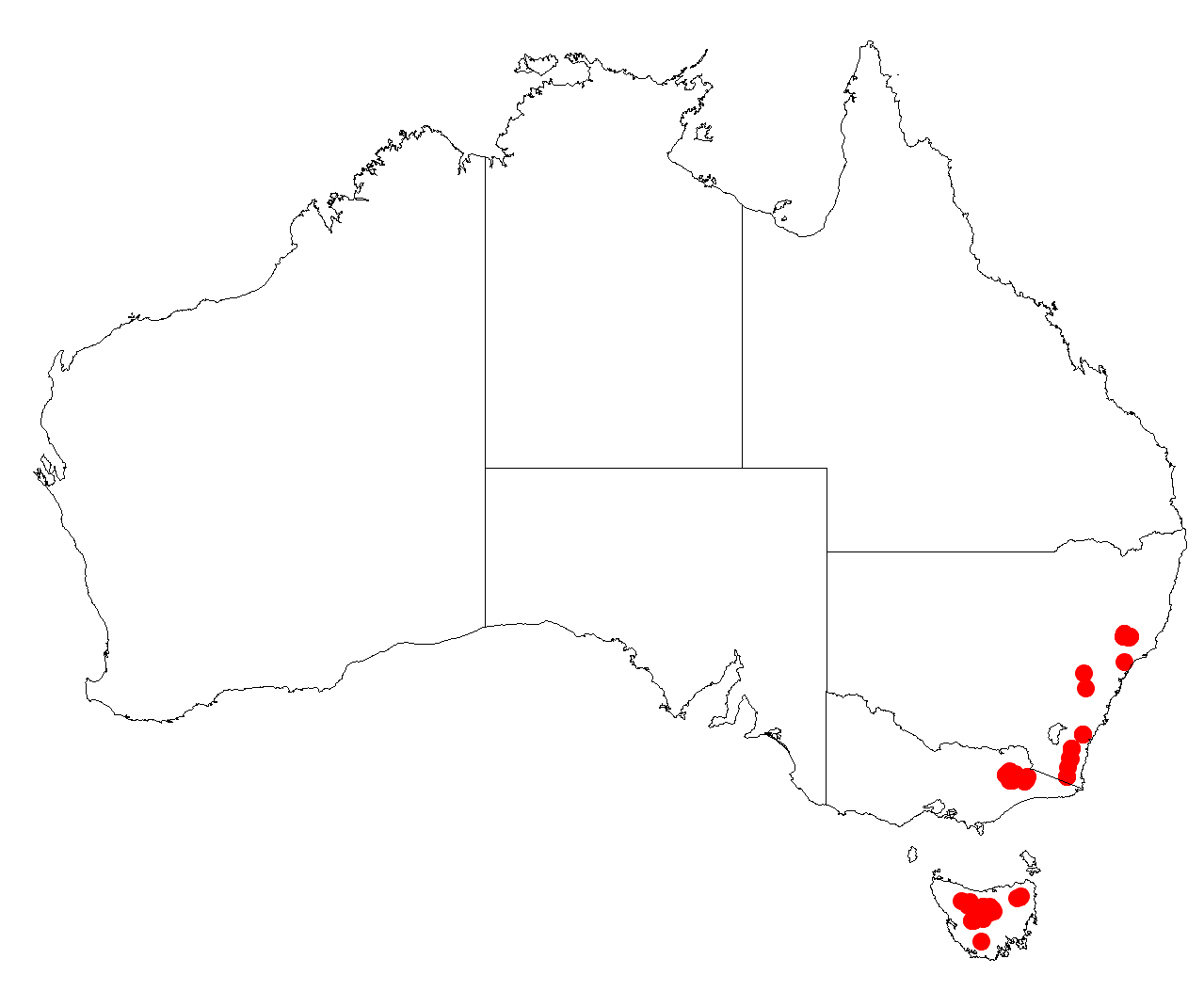
- Occurrence data from AVH

Synonyms
- Leucopogon ciliatus var. β p.p.; Leucopogon piliferus N.A.Wakef. orth. var.; Styphelia pilifera (N.A.Wakef.) J.H.Willis; Leucopogon collinus auct. non (Labill.) R.Br.: Bentham, G. (16 December 1868)

= Leucopogon pilifer =

Species of plant

Leucopogon pilifer, commonly known as thready beard-heath, is a species of flowering plant in the heath family Ericaceae and is endemic to south-eastern Australia. It is a low-lying, dwarf, often mat-forming shrub with long branches, oblong to lance-shaped leaves and crowded, white spikes of densely bearded flowers arranged in groups of between 4 and 9.

== Description ==
Leucopogon pilifer is a low-lying, dwarf shrub with branches up to about 30 m (98 ft) long, and that often forms mats, its young branchlets densely covered with soft hairs. The leaves are more or less erect, oblong to lance-shaped, 3.1–7.3 mm (0.12–0.29 in) long and 0.7–1.3 mm (0.028–0.051 in) wide on a petiole up to 0.5 mm (0.020 in) long. The leaves are more or less glabrous, with 3 to 5, more or less parallel veins visible on the lower surface. The flowers are erect and arranged on the ends of branches and in upper leaf axils in groups of between 4 and 9 with white bracteoles 0.9–1 mm (0.035–0.039 in) long. The sepals are egg-shaped, 1.4–1.6 mm (0.055–0.063 in) long, and the petals are white, 0.9–1.2 mm (0.035–0.047 in) long and joined at the base, forming a tube, with densely bearded lobes about 1.0 mm (0.039 in) long. Flowering occurs from October to February, and the fruit is a glabrous, slightly ridged drupe 1.5–2.0 mm (0.059–0.079 in) long.

== Taxonomy ==
Leucopogon pilifer was first formally described in 1859 by Norman Arthur Wakefield in The Victorian Naturalist from specimens collected by James Hamlyn Willis on the Bogong High Plains in 1947. The specific epithet (pilifer) means "bearing hairs".

== Distribution and habitat ==
Thready beard-heath grows in heath and shrubland at higher altitudes from near Barrington Tops in north-eastern New South Wales to the higher eastern ranges of Victoria, and on the Central Plateau of Tasmania.
