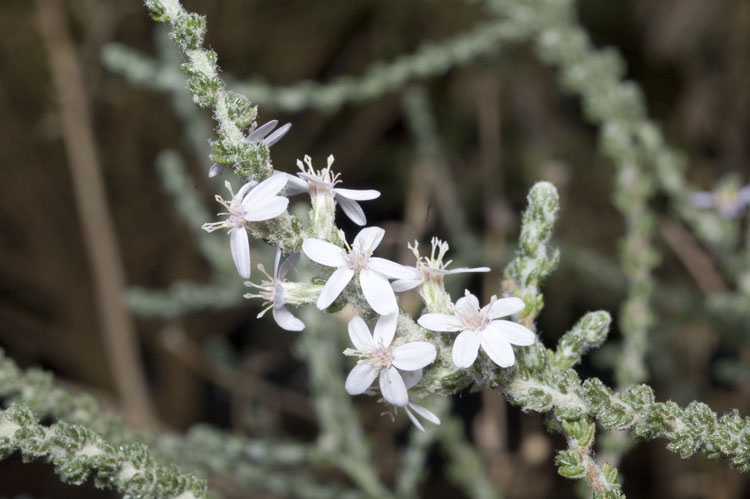
- In the Australian National Botanic Gardens

Scientific classification
- Kingdom: Plantae
- Clade: Tracheophytes
- Clade: Angiosperms
- Clade: Eudicots
- Clade: Asterids
- Order: Asterales
- Family: Asteraceae
- Genus: Olearia
- Species: O. lanuginosa

Binomial name
- Olearia lanuginosa (J.H.Willis) N.A.Wakef.

Synonyms
- Olearia floribunda var. lanuginosa J.H.Willis

= Olearia lanuginosa =

Species of flowering plant

Olearia lanuginosa is a species of flowering plant in the family Asteraceae and is endemic to southern Australia. It is an erect shrub with egg-shaped leaves and white to mauve and yellowish, daisy-like inflorescences.

== Description ==
Olearia lanuginosa is an erect, twiggy shrub that typically grows to a height of up to 1 m (3 ft 3 in) and has cottony-hairy branchlets. Its leaves are arranged alternately along the branchlets, egg-shaped, 0.5–2 mm (0.020–0.079 in) long, 0.5–1.3 mm (0.020–0.051 in) wide, sessile and cottony-hairy. The heads or daisy-like "flowers" are arranged singly on the ends of short side-branchlets and are 7–12 mm (0.28–0.47 in) in diameter and sessile. Each head has four to seven white to mauve ray florets, the ligule 3–5 mm (0.12–0.20 in) long, surrounding five to ten mauve to yellowish disc florets. Flowering occurs from November to March and the fruit is a hairy achene, the pappus with whitish bristles about 2.5 mm (0.098 in) long.

== Taxonomy ==
Woolly olearia was first formally described in 1956 by James Hamlyn Willis who gave it the name Olearia floribunda var. lanuginosa in the journal Muelleria, based on material collected by Joseph Maiden near Murray Bridge in 1907. In the same year, Norman Arthur Wakefield raised the variety to species status as Olearia lanuginosa in The Victorian Naturalist. The specific epithet (lanuginosa) means "abounding in wool".

== Distribution and habitat ==
Olearia lanuginosa grows in heath, mallee and woodlands in the Coolgardie, Great Victoria Desert, Mallee and Murchison bioregions of Western Australia, in the south-east of South Australia and in the Big and Little Deserts and Grampians regions of Victoria.

== Conservation status ==
Woolly daisy bush is listed as "not threatened" by the Department of Biodiversity, Conservation and Attractions.
