= Lanyon High School =

Location
- Heidelberg Crescent, Conder; Canberra, Australian Capital Territory, 2906; Australia; 35.4605°S 149.0962°E

Information
- School type: High School
- Principal: Trish Marton
- Deputy Principal: Julie Wardle
- Deputy Principal: Jenni Evans-Holder
- Grades: Year 7–10
- Age range: 12–17
- Enrolment: 650
- Average class size: 25–30
- Education system: Public Education
- Language: English
- Colours: White and Navy
- Nickname: Lanyon High
- Feeder schools: Bonython Primary School, Gordon Primary School and Conder Primary School
- Website: www.lanyonhs.act.edu.au

Lanyon High School is a secondary school located in Conder, Australian Capital Territory. It serves the Lanyon Valley and surrounding rural areas in the Tuggeranong district of Canberra, Australia. The school was established in 1996 by the ACT department of education to address the needs of young people in years 7–10 as they move from primary school to further education, training or employment.

== History ==
There is a lot of history in the school walls, such as the Canberran singing legend himself, Timomatic. The school has had many visits from famous names of the world, and has been interviewed by WIN News.

== School structure ==
The school is split into four sub schools:

- Green – English/SOSE/LOTE
- Gold – Maths/Science/PE
- Red – The Arts and Technology
- Blue – Student Services

== Buildings ==
Lanyon's main building is two stories high. The top level is Green (English/SOSE/LOTE) and the bottom is split into two areas, Red (The Arts and Technology) and Gold (Maths/Science/PE). The school has four computer labs plus a library. There are six science labs, as well as a separate dance and drama room. The majority of rooms are equipped with smartboards.

== School houses ==
Students participate in the Athletics carnival, Swimming Carnival and the Cross country in their school houses. Students are placed into school houses according to their surname.

- Bond (Red) A–F (named after Australian Paralympic wheelchair Rugby Player Chris Bond)
- Buchanan (Yellow) G-O (named after Olympian Caroline Buchanan who is an Australian cyclist in BMX and mountain biking)
- Mills (Green) P–Z (named after Olympian Patrick Mills who is an Indigenous Australian professional basketball player)

== Enrolment ==
Lanyon High School enrolls students in Year 7 from a number of feeder primary schools, including Gordon, Conder and Bonython primary schools. For year 8–10 enrolments are accepted for students living in the area according to vacant spaces available at the school.

== Lanyon Cluster ==
The Lanyon Cluster schools are:

- Bonython Primary School
- Gordon Primary School
- Charles Conder Primary School

== See also ==
- List of schools in the Australian Capital Territory
