= Theodore, Australian Capital Territory =

Theodore
- Suburb
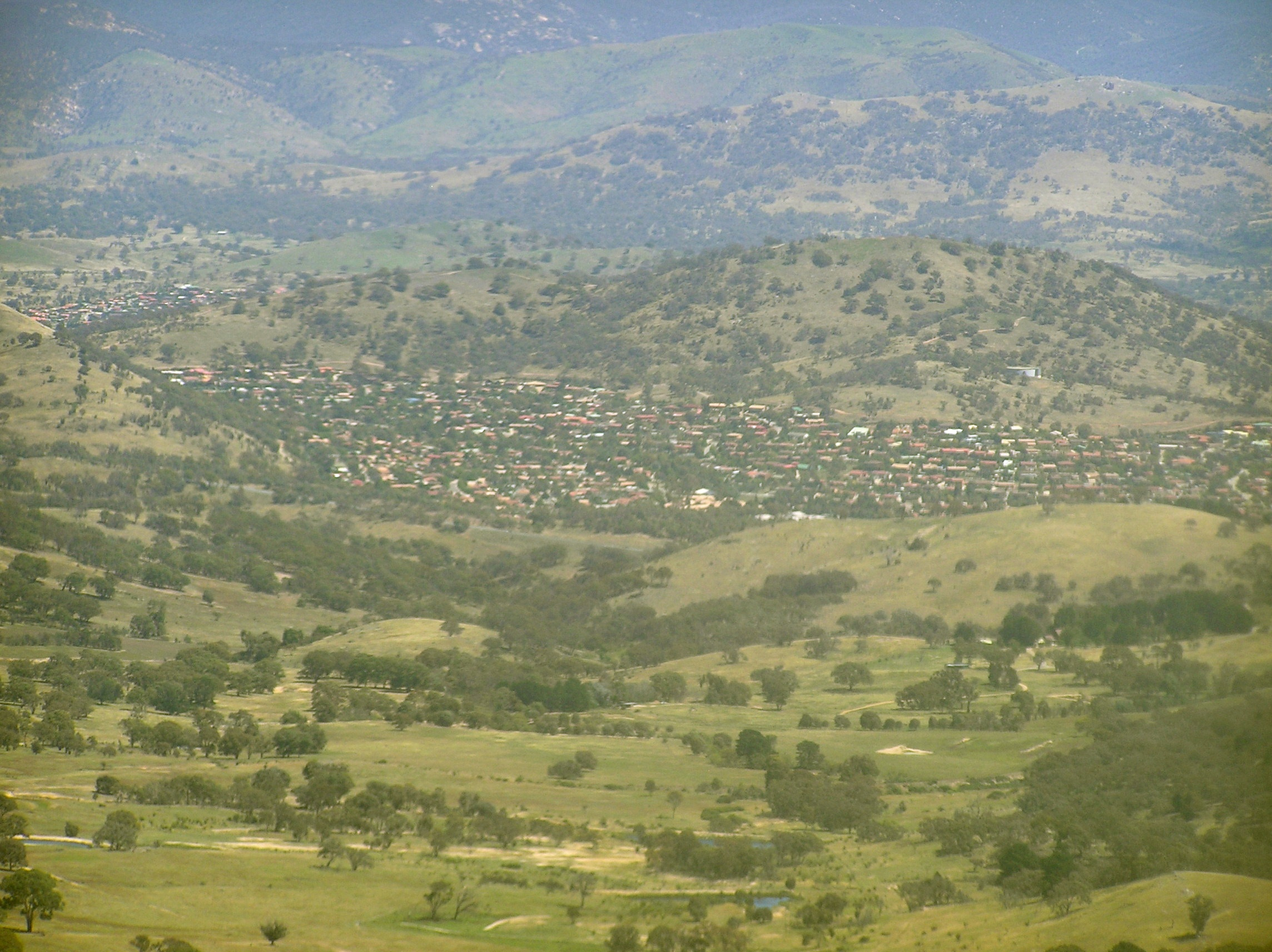
- Aerial photo

- Coordinates: 35°26′46″S 149°07′19″E
- Country: Australia
- State: Australian Capital Territory
- City: Canberra
- District: Tuggeranong
- Established: 1986

Government
  - Territory electorate: Brindabella
  - Federal division: Bean

Area
  - Total: 3.1 km^{2} (1.2 sq mi)

Population
  - Total: 3,798 (2021 census)
  - Density: 1,225/km^{2} (3,170/sq mi)
- Postcode: 2905
- Gazetted: 5 August 1975
Suburbs around Theodore
Calwell	Calwell	Nature reserve
Conder	Theodore	Nature reserve
Conder	Nature reserve	Nature reserve

Theodore is a suburb in the Canberra, Australia district of Tuggeranong. The suburb is named after Edward Granville Theodore (1884–1950), a Queensland premier and deputy Prime Minister. It was gazetted on 5 August 1975. Streets are named after people involved with the civilian war effort during the world wars. The main street through the suburb is named after Sir Lawrence Wackett KBE, DFC, AFC, who is widely regarded as the "father of the Australian aircraft industry".

At the 2021 census, Theodore had a population of 3,798.

It is next to the suburbs of Conder and Calwell. It is bounded by the Monaro Highway and Tharwa drive. Located in the suburb is Theodore Primary School and a neighbourhood oval. It borders on Tuggeranong Hill and the Canberra Nature Park of Tuggeranong Hill nature reserve.

== History ==
On the North Eastern side of Theodore are the Theodore Grinding Grooves. The Theodore Aboriginal artefact grinding grooves demonstrate an important aspect of past Aboriginal lifestyles and technology. A place of this type is rare in the ACT and highly valued by the Ngunnawal people as evidence of the importance of the artefact grinding process and the surrounding area to their ancestors. It is a notable example of this type of site, with a large number of grooves and associated artefacts, indicating continuous and varied use of the site over time.

== Geology ==
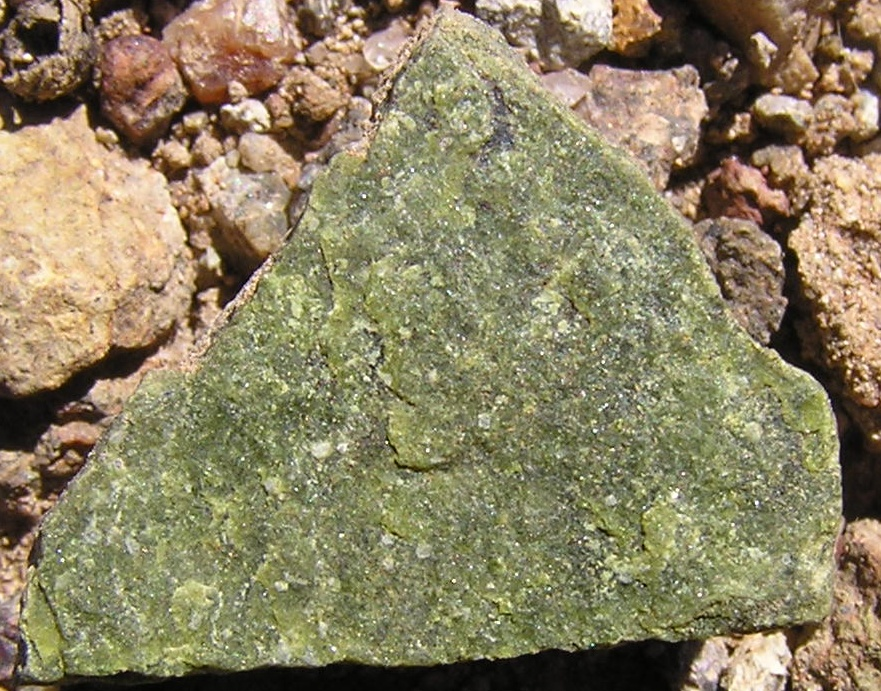
Green modified rhyodacite from Theodore

Deakin Volcanics of various kinds underlie the suburb. These are from the late Silurian age 414 Mya. Deakin Volcanics Rhyodacite and sediments are in the east. Deakin Volcanics red-purple and green grey rhyodacite are in the centre. Deakin Volcanics green grey and purple rhyodacite are in the west. Deakin Volcanics cream rhyolite is in high south east parts. Quaternary alluvium is in the north lower parts, washed off the surrounding slopes.
