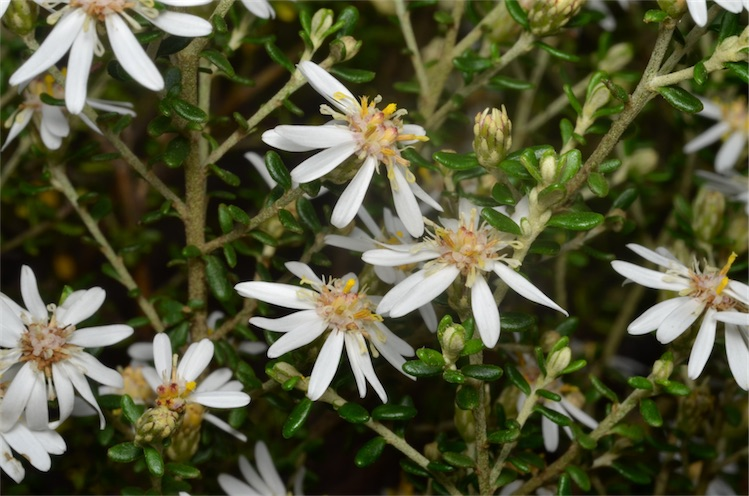
- In Lincoln National Park

Scientific classification
- Kingdom: Plantae
- Clade: Tracheophytes
- Clade: Angiosperms
- Clade: Eudicots
- Clade: Asterids
- Order: Asterales
- Family: Asteraceae
- Genus: Olearia
- Species: O. brachyphylla

Binomial name
- Olearia brachyphylla (F.Muell. Sond.) N.A.Wakef.

Synonyms
- Aster brachyphyllus (F.Muell. ex Sond.) F.Muell.; Aster exilifolius F.Muell.; Eurybia brachyphylla F.Muell. ex Sond.; Olearia exilifolia F.Muell. nom. inval., pro syn.; Olearia exilifolia (F.Muell.) F.Muell. ex Benth.

= Olearia brachyphylla =

Species of plant

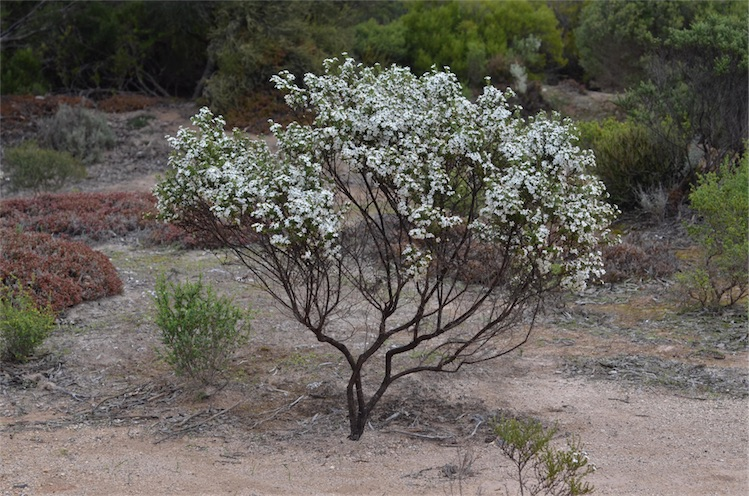
Habit

Olearia brachyphylla is a species of flowering plant in the family Asteraceae and is endemic to southern continental Australia. It is a densely-branched, aromatic shrub with woolly-hairy stems, oblong to egg-shaped leaves with the narrower end towards the base and small white and pale yellow, daisy-like inflorescences.

== Description ==
Olearia brachyphylla is a densely-branched, aromatic shrub that typically grows to a height of 0.3–1.5 m (1 ft 0 in – 4 ft 11 in) with its stems covered with woolly hairs. The leaves are oblong to egg-shaped with the narrower end towards the base, 1–3 mm (0.039–0.118 in) long, up to 1 mm (0.039 in) wide and more or less sessile. The edges of the leaves are rolled under, the lower surface covered with a thin layer of woolly hairs. The heads or daisy-like "flowers" are arranged singly on the ends of stems and short side branchlets, and are more or less sessile, with three or four rows of bracts forming an involucre 4–5 mm (0.16–0.20 in) long at the base. Each head has five to nine ray florets, the white petal-like ligules 3–9 mm (0.12–0.35 in) long, surrounding four to eight pale yellow disc florets. Flowering occurs from July to October and the fruit is an achene 1.5–2 mm (0.059–0.079 in) long, the 25 to 40 pappus bristles about 3 mm (0.12 in) long.

== Taxonomy ==
This daisy-bush was first formally described in 1853 by Otto Wilhelm Sonder who gave it the name Eurybia brachyphylla in the journal Linnaea: ein Journal für die Botanik in ihrem ganzen Umfange, oder Beiträge zur Pflanzenkunde, from an unpublished description by Ferdinand von Mueller. In 1956, Norman Arthur Wakefield changed the name to Olearia brachyphylla in The Victorian Naturalist. The specific epithet (brachyphylla) means "short-leaved".

== Distribution and habitat ==
Olearia brachyphylla grows in mallee and heath in southern South Australia, and in the Avon Wheatbelt, Esperance Plains and Mallee biogeographic regions of south-western Western Australia.
