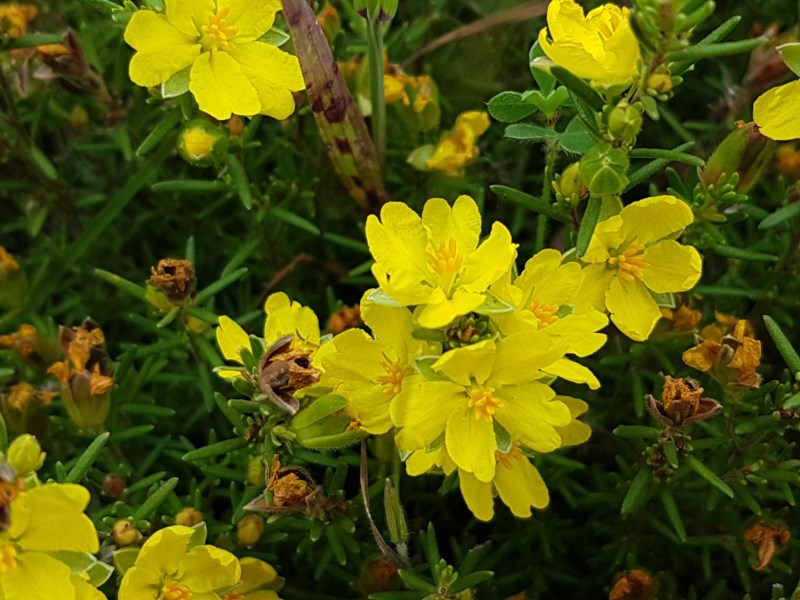
- Near Hall in the A.C.T.

Scientific classification
- Kingdom: Plantae
- Clade: Tracheophytes
- Clade: Angiosperms
- Clade: Eudicots
- Order: Dilleniales
- Family: Dilleniaceae
- Genus: Hibbertia
- Species: H. calycina

Binomial name
- Hibbertia calycina (DC.) N.A.Wakef.

= Hibbertia calycina =

Lesser guinea flower

Species of flowering plant

Hibbertia calycina, commonly known as the lesser guinea flower, is a species of flowering plant in the family Dilleniaceae and is endemic to south-eastern Australia. It is a small shrub with linear leaves and yellow flowers with eight to eighteen stamens in a single cluster on one side of the two carpels.

== Description ==
Hibbertia calycina is a shrub that typically grows to a height of up to 30 cm (12 in). The leaves are linear, mostly 5–10 mm (0.20–0.39 in) long and about 1 mm (0.039 in) wide on a petiole 0.3–0.9 mm (0.012–0.035 in) long and with the edges rolled under. The flowers are arranged on the ends of branchlets and are sessile. Each flower is surrounded by small leaves and a single triangular bract 1.4–2.2 mm (0.055–0.087 in) long. The sepals are 4.4–6.8 mm (0.17–0.27 in) long and hairy, the petals yellow and 5.5–6.8 mm (0.22–0.27 in) long. There are eight to eighteen stamens arranged in a single cluster on one side of the two woolly-hairy carpels. Flowering occurs from September to November.

== Taxonomy ==
This species was first described in 1817 by Augustin Pyramus de Candolle and given the name Pleurandra calycina in Regni Vegetabilis Systema Naturale. In 1955, Norman Arthur Wakefield changed the name to Hibbertia calycina in The Victorian Naturalist.

== Distribution and habitat ==
Lesser guinea flower grows in woodland on rocky slopes on the ranges and tablelands of southern New South Wales, the Australian Capital Territory and north-eastern Victoria. It also occurs in a few places in eastern Tasmania where it is very rare.

== Conservation status ==
Hibbertia calycina is listed as "vulnerable" under the Tasmanian Government Threatened Species Protection Act 1995.
