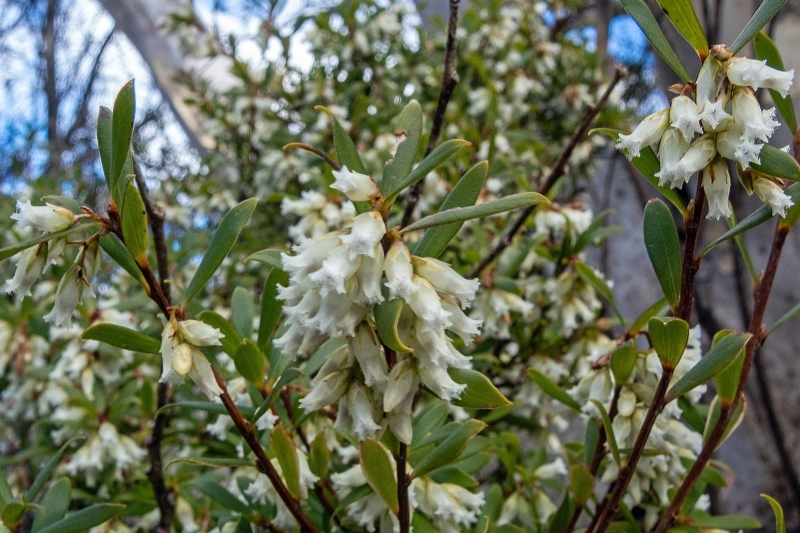
- Near Tidbinbilla

Scientific classification
- Kingdom: Plantae
- Clade: Tracheophytes
- Clade: Angiosperms
- Clade: Eudicots
- Clade: Asterids
- Order: Ericales
- Family: Ericaceae
- Genus: Leucopogon
- Species: L. gelidus

Binomial name
- Leucopogon gelidus N.A.Wakef.
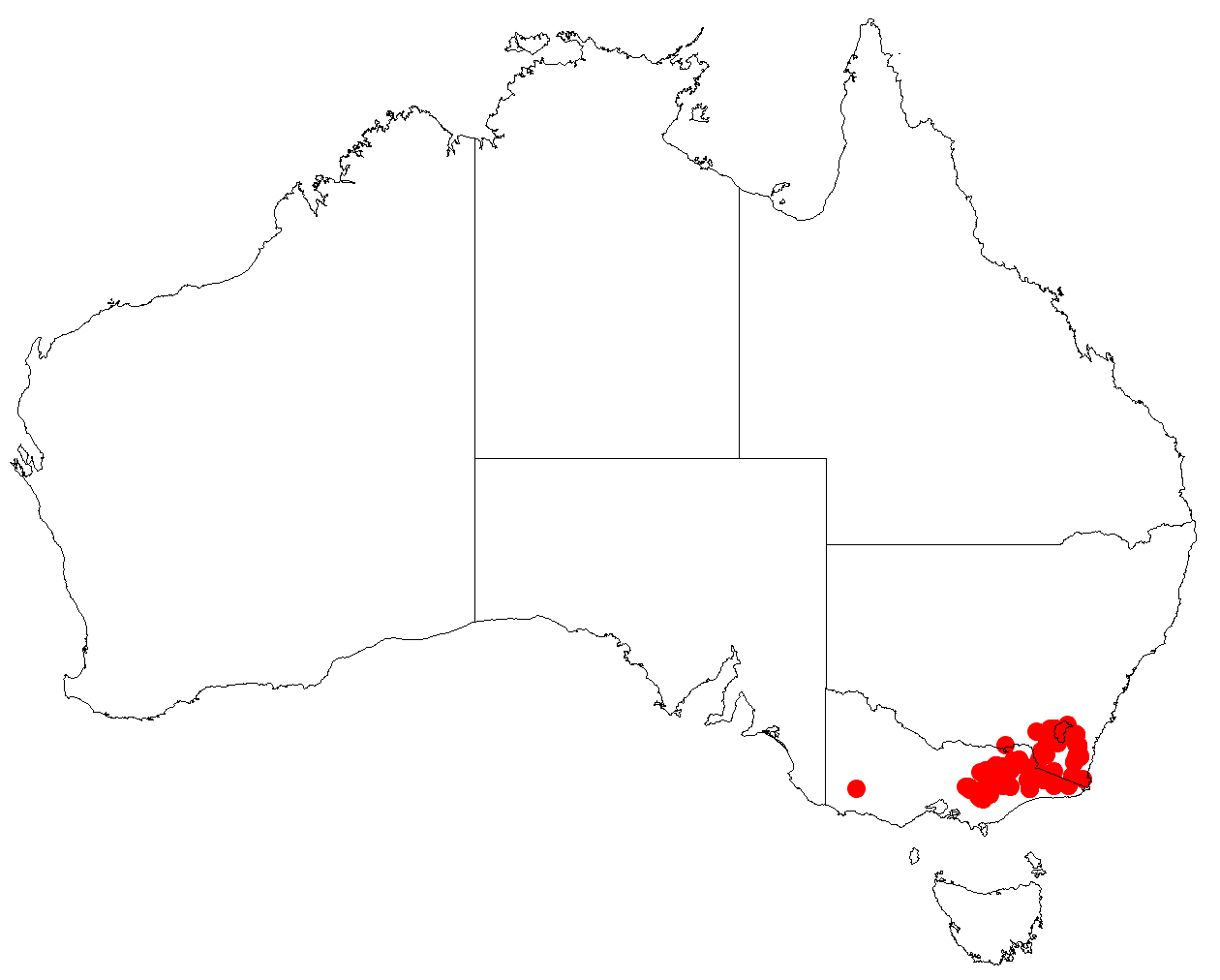
- Occurrence data from AVH

Synonyms
- Leucopogon lanceolatus var. gelida F.Muell. orth. var.; Leucopogon lanceolatus var. gelidus F.Muell.; Leucopogon lanceolatus var. gelidus Benth. nom. illeg.; Monotoca concolor Gand.; Styphelia gelida (N.A.Wakef.) J.H.Willis

= Leucopogon gelidus =

Species of flowering plant

Leucopogon gelidus is a species of flowering plant in the heath family Ericaceae and is native to south-eastern continental Australia. It is a slender, compact shrub with elliptic to egg-shaped leaves, and spikes of drooping, tube-shaped white flowers.

== Description ==
Leucopogon gelidus is a slender, compact shrub that typically grows to a height of up to about 2 m (6 ft 7 in) and has sparsely softly-hairy branchlets. Its leaves are more or less erect, egg-shaped to lance-shaped with the narrower end towards the base, 10–25 mm (0.39–0.98 in) long, 2–6.5 mm (0.079–0.256 in) wide and glabrous. The flowers droop and are arranged in spikes of 3 to 8, 7–15 mm (0.28–0.59 in) long with egg-shaped bracteoles 1.4–2.3 mm (0.055–0.091 in) long at the base. The sepals are egg-shaped, 2.5–3.0 mm (0.098–0.118 in) long, the petals forming a tube 2.1–4.8 mm (0.083–0.189 in) long and softly-hairy inside, the petal lobes 1.3–2.4 mm (0.051–0.094 in) long. Flowering mainly occurs from September to February and the fruit is a glabrous, pink to red, oval to spherical drupe 3.5–4.0 mm (0.14–0.16 in) long.

== Taxonomy ==
Leucopogon gelidus was first formally described in 1956 by Norman Arthur Wakefield in The Victorian Naturalist. The specific epithet (gelidus) means "very cold".

== Distribution and habitat ==
This leucopogon grows in subalpine woodland on scree slopes and between rocks at higher altitudes south from Mount Gingera in New South Wales and the Australian Capital Territory to Lake Mountain in eastern Victoria.
