= Banks, Australian Capital Territory =

Banks
- Suburb
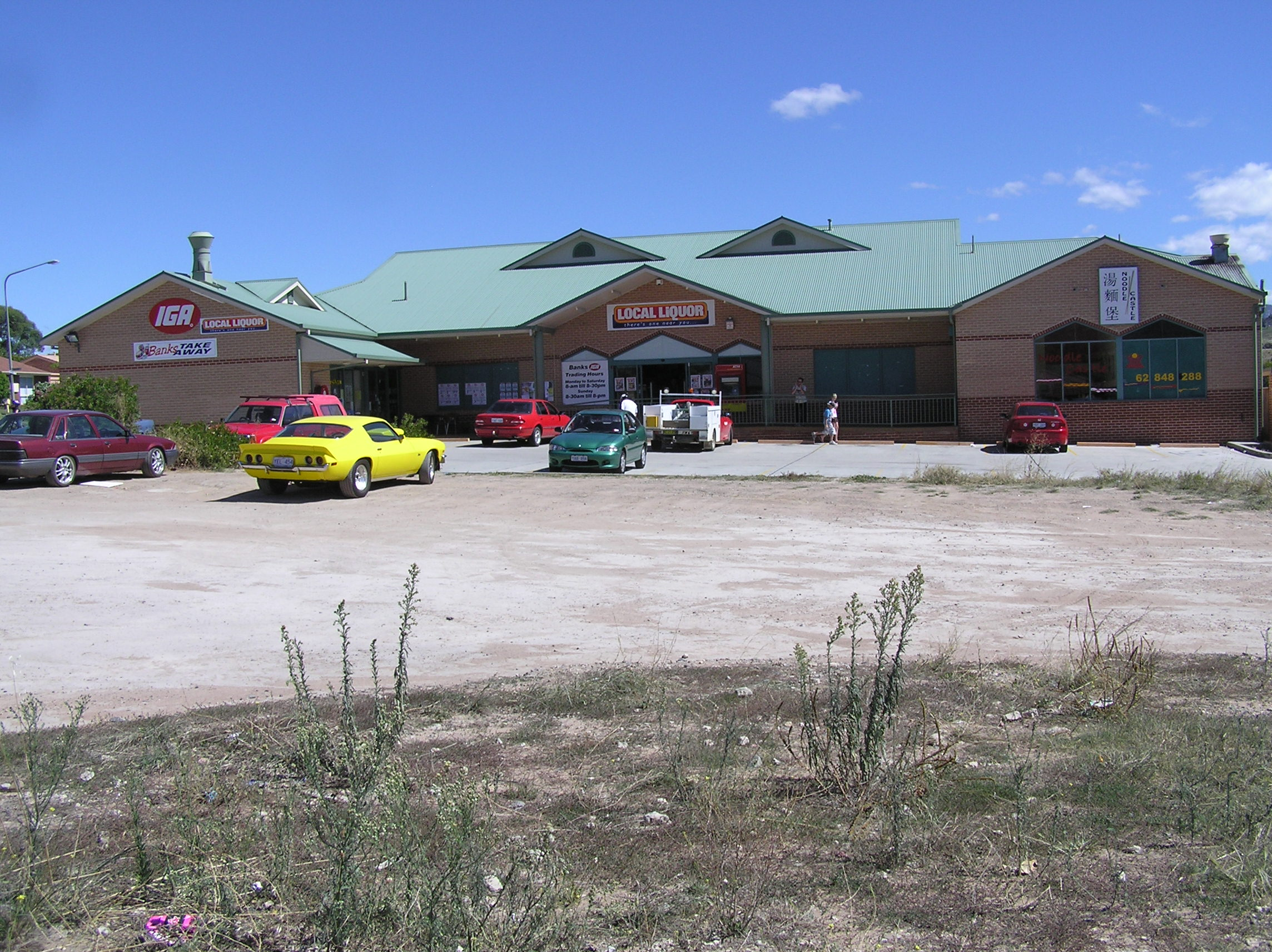
- Shops at Pockett Avenue

- Coordinates: 35°28′23″S 149°05′42″E
- Country: Australia
- State: Australian Capital Territory
- City: Canberra
- District: Tuggeranong
- Established: 1992

Government
  - Territory electorate: Brindabella
  - Federal division: Bean

Area
  - Total: 2.3 km^{2} (0.89 sq mi)

Population
  - Total: 5,100 (SAL 2021)
- Postcode: 2906
- Gazetted: 12 March 1987
Suburbs around Banks
Gordon	Conder	Conder
Gordon	Banks	Rob Roy Nature Reserve
Murrumbidgee River corridor	Tharwa Drive	Rob Roy Nature Reserve

Banks is a suburb in the Canberra, Australia district of Tuggeranong. It is the most southerly suburb of Canberra. The suburb is named after Sir Joseph Banks (1743–1820), the botanist who accompanied Captain James Cook to Botany Bay in 1770. The suburb was gazetted on 12 March 1987. The theme of the street names is botany or natural history.

Banks is located adjacent to the suburbs of Conder and Gordon. It is bounded by Box Hill Avenue, Tom Roberts Avenue and Tharwa Drive. Located in the suburb is Beau and Jessi Park and the Banks Oval.

The Rob Roy Nature Reserve, part of Canberra Nature Park, is a hilly region to the east of Banks that includes Mt Rob Roy. Nearer and also to the east of Banks is the smaller mountain Big Monks, accessible from Wollemi Place. Big Monks has a gliding stage near the top, allowing paragliders and hang-gliders to fly over the suburb of Banks. The suburb itself slopes gently to the west-northwest.

There is a small shopping centre in the suburb, on the main internal road, Pockett Avenue. It includes two small take-away food shops, a pet grooming shop and a SUPAEXPRESS supermarket.

Banks 1, Banks' only oval, is used for local events such as Little Athletics and the Saint Clare of Assisi Primary School Athletics Carnival.

== Geology ==
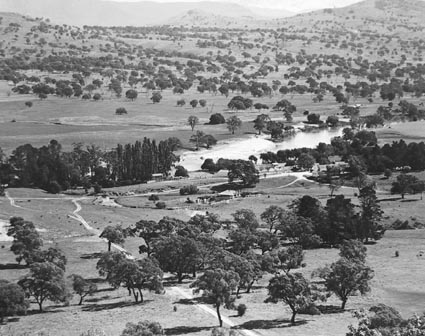
Aerial view of Lanyon Station, 1950

Alluvium is the surface geology for the whole suburb. Beneath the alluvium and making up the surrounding hills are the Deakin Volcanics, which erupted during the Silurian age 414 million years ago.

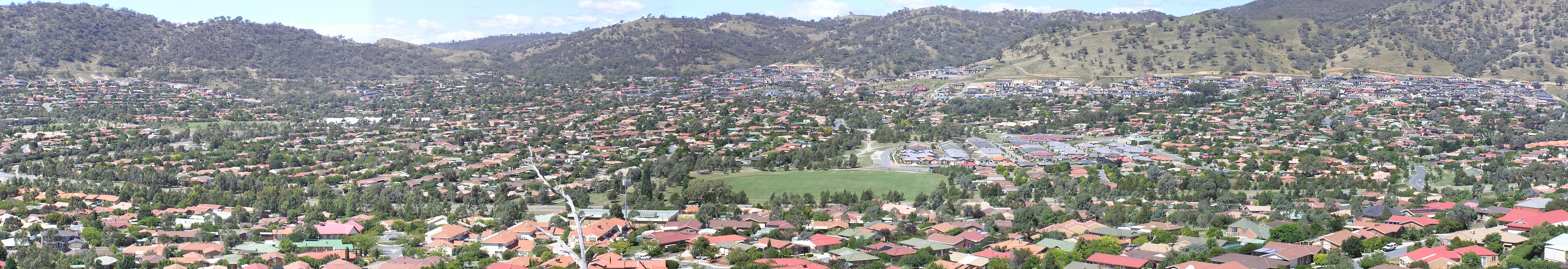
