= Tuggeranong Hill =

Mountain in Australian Capital Territory

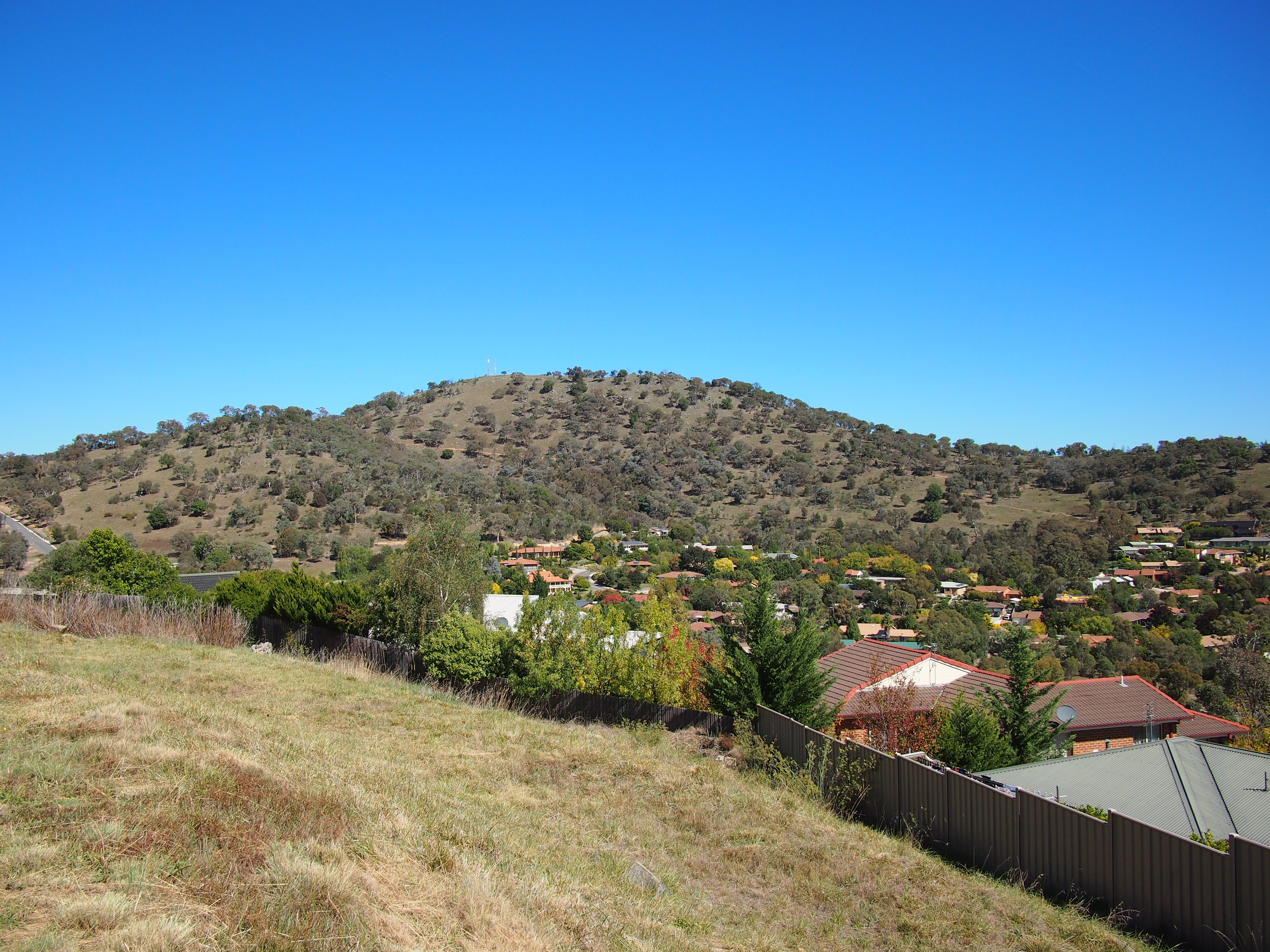
- Tuggeranong Hill viewed from Chisholm

Highest point
- Elevation: 855 m (2,805 ft)
- Prominence: 618 m
- Coordinates: 35°27′12″S 149°06′28″E

Geography
- Location within Australian Capital Territory
- Location: Australian Capital Territory, Australia

Tuggeranong Hill is located in Tuggeranong, Canberra. It is sometimes referred to as Mount Tuggeranong due to its prominence.

Lanyon Valley is almost completely surrounded by hills and mountains and consequently television transmissions from Black Mountain are affected. To overcome this, there is a broadcast translator on top of Tuggeranong Hill. There is a track to the repeater on top of Tuggeranong Hill for service vehicles that doubles as a fire trail.

Tuggeranong Hill is part of the Canberra Nature Park. A walk to the top of Tuggeranong Hill provides views of the Lanyon Valley and of the rest of southern Canberra.

Tuggeranong Hill stands 855 metres (2800 feet) above sea level.

Panorama view from Tuggeranong Hill facing south. The broadcast translator towers can be seen in the foreground to the right

== See also ==
- Tuggeranong (district)
