= Gordon, Australian Capital Territory =

Gordon
- Suburb
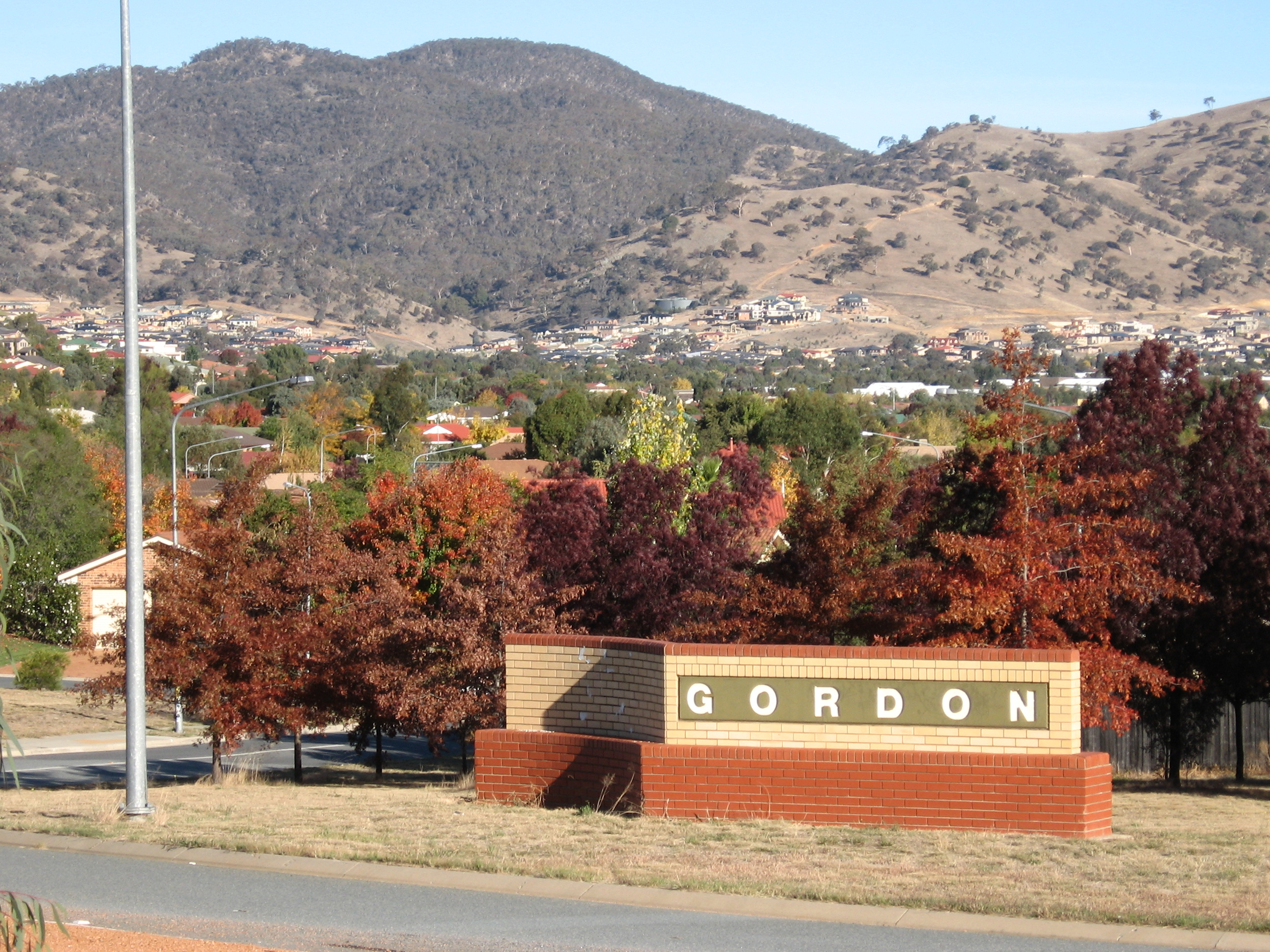
- View across Gordon towards Mount Rob Roy

- Coordinates: 35°27′04″S 149°05′06″E
- Country: Australia
- State: Australian Capital Territory
- City: Canberra
- District: Tuggeranong
- Established: 1990

Government
  - Territory electorate: Brindabella
  - Federal division: Bean

Area
  - Total: 4.4 km^{2} (1.7 sq mi)

Population
  - Total: 7,892 (SAL 2021)
- Postcode: 2906
- Gazetted: 12 March 1987
Suburbs around Gordon
Bonython	Bonython	Calwell
Murrumbidgee River Corridor	Gordon	Conder
Murrumbidgee River Corridor	Murrumbidgee River Corridor	Banks

Gordon is a suburb in the Canberra, Australia district of Tuggeranong. The postcode is 2906. The suburb is named after the poet Adam Lindsay Gordon (1833–1870). It was gazetted on 12 March 1987. Streets are named after sportspersons, an example is Woodfull Loop, named after the captain of the Australia national cricket team during the Bodyline test series.

It is next to the suburbs of Bonython, Conder and Banks. It is located on the west side of Tharwa Drive. Located in the suburb is the Point Hut Pond, with the Point Hut district park. Gordon has a primary school and neighbourhood oval.

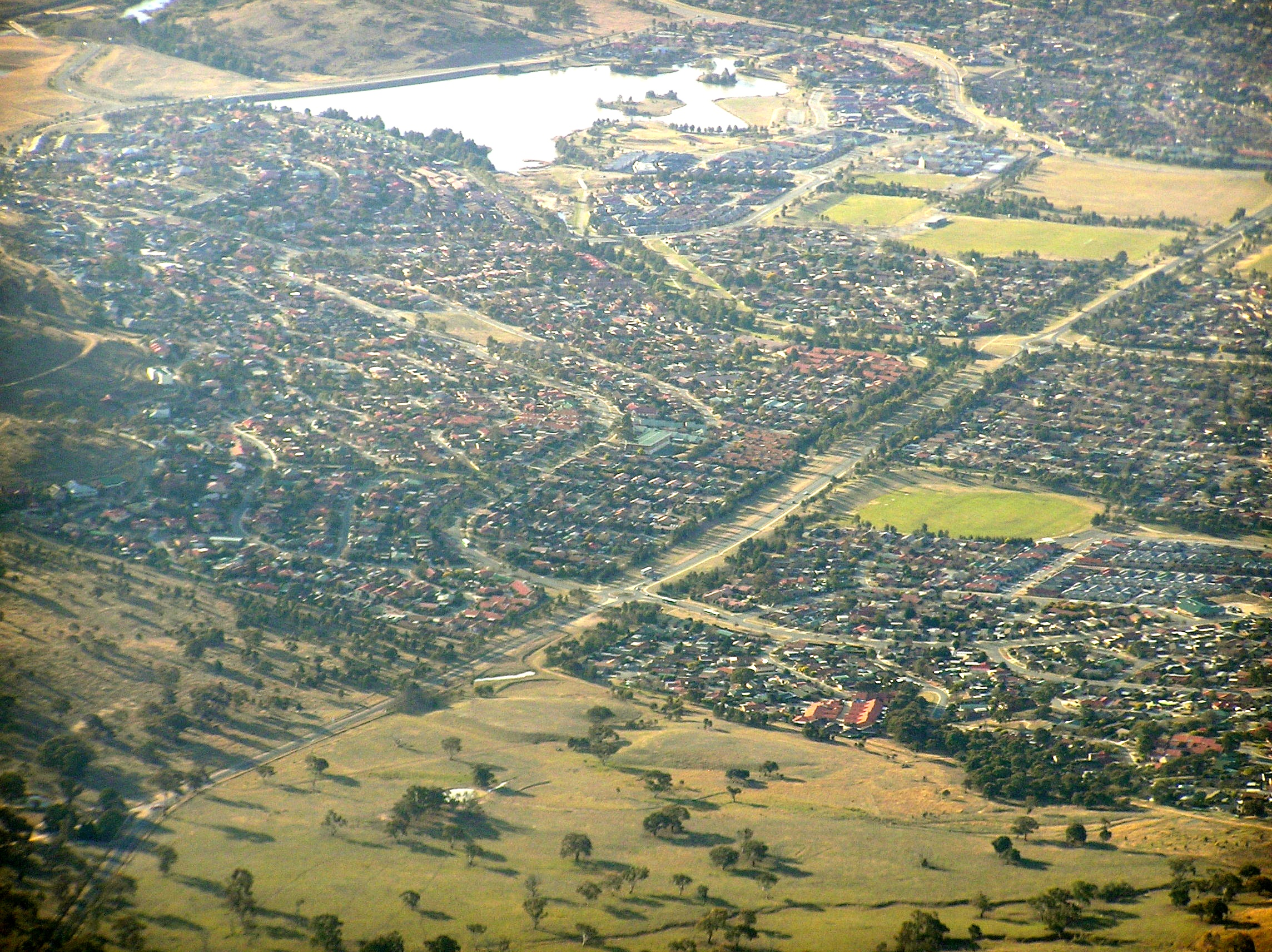
Aerial view of Gordon from south east

== Geology ==
Quaternary alluvium is found in south and centre of Gordon. Deakin Volcanics rhyodacitic crystal tuff from the Silurian age is on the surface in the north of the suburb.
