= Norman Arthur Wakefield =

Australian naturalist (1918–1972)

Norman Arthur Wakefield (28 November 1918 – 23 September 1972) was an Australian teacher, naturalist, paleontologist and botanist, notable as an expert on ferns. He described many new species of plants.

Wakefield was born in Romsey, Victoria, and educated at state schools in Orbost and at Scotch College, Melbourne with a BSc in biology. He joined the Victorian Education Department in 1934 and served as a teacher in various parts of East Gippsland.

During the Second World War Wakefield served with the Australian Army in Papua and New Guinea (1943–1944) and on Bougainville (1944–1945).

From 1955 to 1965 he lectured in natural history and science at the Melbourne Teachers' College. In 1960 he graduated as a Bachelor of Science at the University of Melbourne, and in 1969 completed an MSc in paleontology at Monash University, as well as lecturing in biology at Monash Teachers' College.

In the early 1960s he made broadcasts on school nature study for the ABC, as well as writing a regular column for the Melbourne Age 1963–1971. He wrote numerous popular articles on natural history as well as many scientific papers in international and local journals. Books he wrote include:

- 1955 – Ferns of Victoria and Tasmania. (Field Naturalists' Club of Victoria: Melbourne. Revised edition published 1976).
- 1967 – Naturalist's Diary. (Longmans: Melbourne).

The majority of the herbarium specimens collected by Wakefield are held by the National Herbarium of Victoria (MEL), Royal Botanic Gardens Victoria. The ferns collected during his war service are also housed in the British Museum.

== FNCV ==
Wakefield was very active in the Field Naturalists Club of Victoria (FNCV), which he joined in 1938. He founded its Fauna Group and also edited its journal, the Victorian Naturalist 1953–1964, contributing 126 articles on ornithology, botany and history. In 1956 he was elected an Honorary Life Member of the FNCV, and in 1962 was awarded the Australian Natural History Medallion.

Wakefield was killed at the age of 53 in a fall from a tree, while lopping branches, in his garden at his home in Sherbrooke, Victoria.
