= Hyperdome =

Hyperdome may refer to:

- Logan Hyperdome, a shopping centre in Logan City, Queensland
- South.Point Tuggeranong, formerly Tuggeranong Hyperdome, a shopping centre in Tuggeranong, Australian Capital Territory
