= Harbourside Residences =

Residential skyscraper in Sydney, Australia

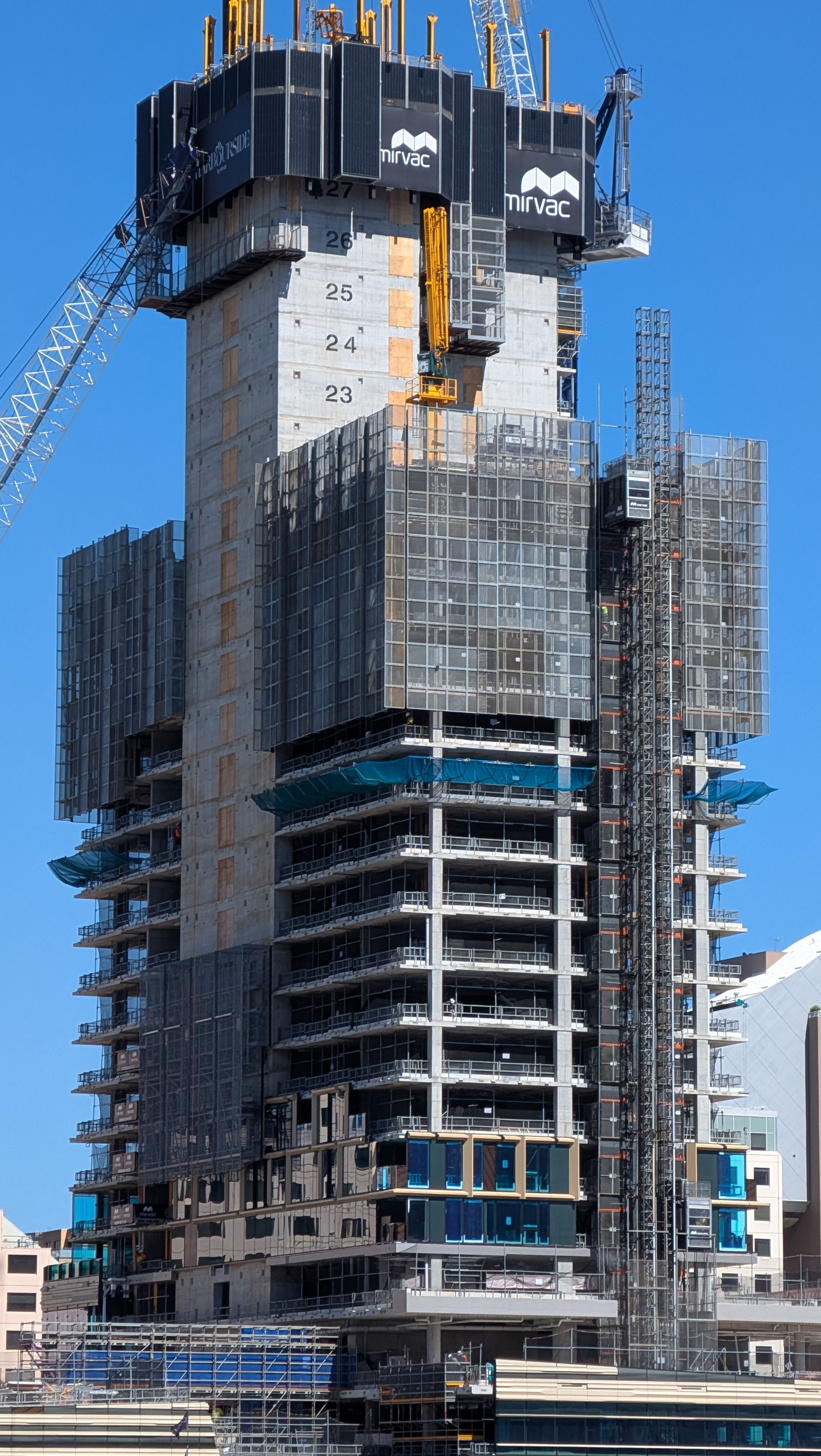
- Harbourside Residences under construction in November 2025
- Interactive map of the Harbourside Residences area

General information
- Type: Residential
- Location: Sydney, Australia
- Coordinates: 33.871386°S 151.198823°E
- Construction started: 2023
- Opening: 2027

Height
- Height: 160 metres

Design and construction
- Architecture firm: Snøhetta
- Developer: Mirvac

Harbourside Residences is a residential skyscraper in Sydney, Australia, which is under construction as of 2023.

== History ==
Construction work on the building, jointly designed by the architectural firms Snøhetta and Hassell and developed by the real estate company Mirvac as part of the broader urban regeneration project of the former Harbourside Shopping Centre, began in 2023 with completion expected in 2027. In 2024, the first release of the tower's apartments generated over 600 million Australian dollars in pre-sales over the course of a single weekend. In September 2025, it was announced that the Japanese company Mitsubishi Real Estate Co had joined the project by acquiring a 50% stake.

== Description ==
Located on Sydney's Darling Harbour waterfront, the building will rise 48 stories to a height of around 160 metres.
