= Renault PR100.3 =

French step-entrance and low-floor single-decker bus

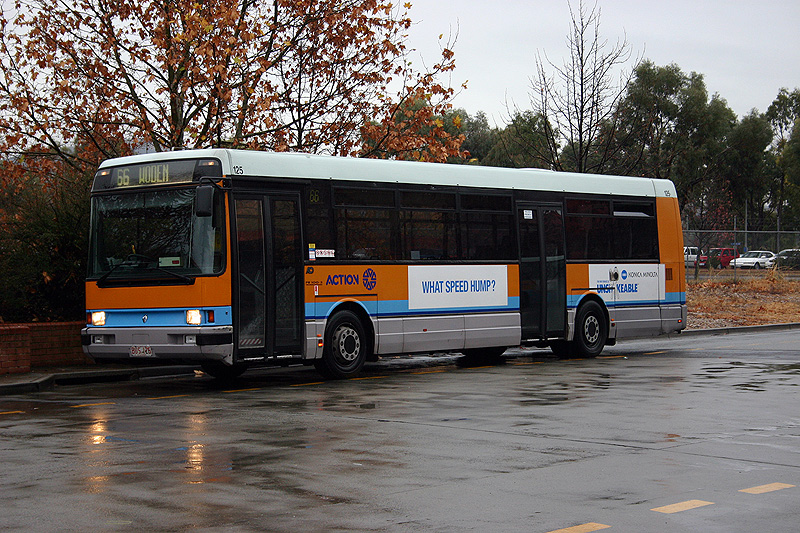
- ACTION Austral Denning bodied Renault PR100.3 at Tuggeranong Interchange in June 2006

Overview
- Manufacturer: Renault Trucks
- Assembly: Saint-Priest, France

Body and chassis
- Doors: 1 or 2
- Floor type: Step-entrance (PR100.3); Low floor (PR100.3A)

Powertrain
- Capacity: 34 to 50 seated

Dimensions
- Length: 11.95 metres
- Width: 2.50 metres
- Height: 3.00 metres
- Curb weight: 14.4 tonnes

The Renault PR100.3 was a step-entrance and low-floor single-decker bus marketed in Australia, based on the Renault R312. The bus, like the PR100.2, was a package with a standard R312 front, chassis and dash (with steering column), and choices of bodywork.

== Australia ==
Only three operators in Australia purchased the PR100.3: ACTION, King Brothers and Transperth.

=== ACTION ===
ACTION purchased 42 PR100.3 buses, all with Austral-Denning bodies which incorporated the R312 front. Two of these were originally powered by compressed natural gas (CNG), but were converted to operate on diesel in 2007. All 42 buses were withdrawn by July 2020.

=== Busways ===
Busways inherited 25 PR100.3s when it purchased King Brothers from its receivers in 2004. Twenty-four were bodied by Custom Coaches and one by Northcoast Bus & Coach. They are mainly on the Mid North Coast of New South Wales, but a few have made their way to Blacktown, in Western Sydney.

=== Transperth ===
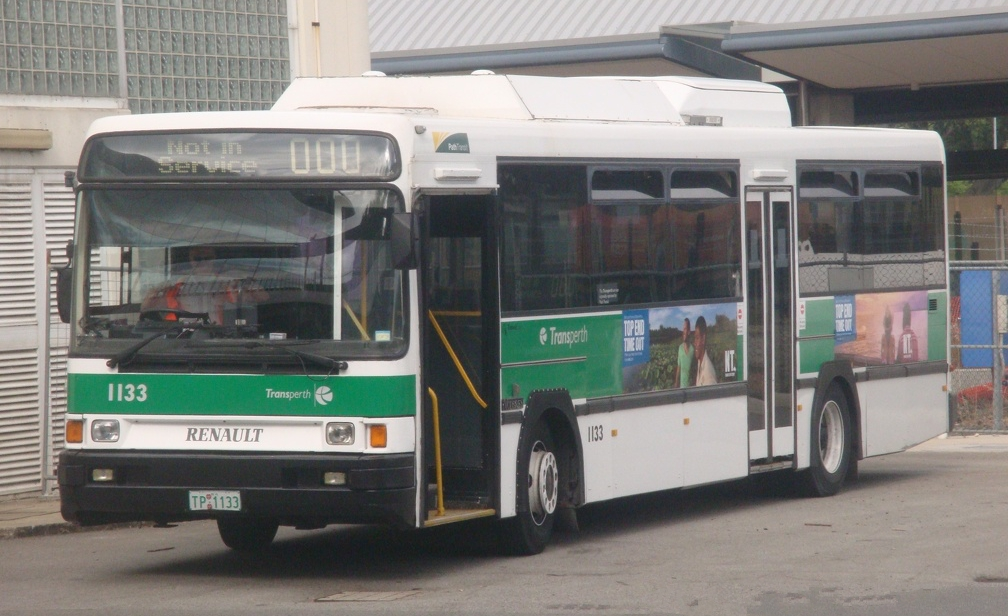
Transperth Volgren bodied PR100.3

Transperth purchased one Volgren bodied PR100.3. It was operated by Path Transit. This bus differs in many ways from the ACTION fleet in the shape and design of the body and interior (looking less like the European R312), and also has an evaporative cooler. The only similar features are the dash, chassis, steering column and the R312 front.

This bus was numbered 1133 in the Transperth fleet and was offered for sale in 1993, but there was no buyer. It was normally used by Transperth only when it was critically required due to its poor performance. It was converted to Compressed Natural Gas (CNG) fuel by Transcom. This bus was withdrawn in 2016 and has sold to a private owner to be secured for preservation.
