= Tuggeranong Interchange =

Bus station in Canberra, Australia

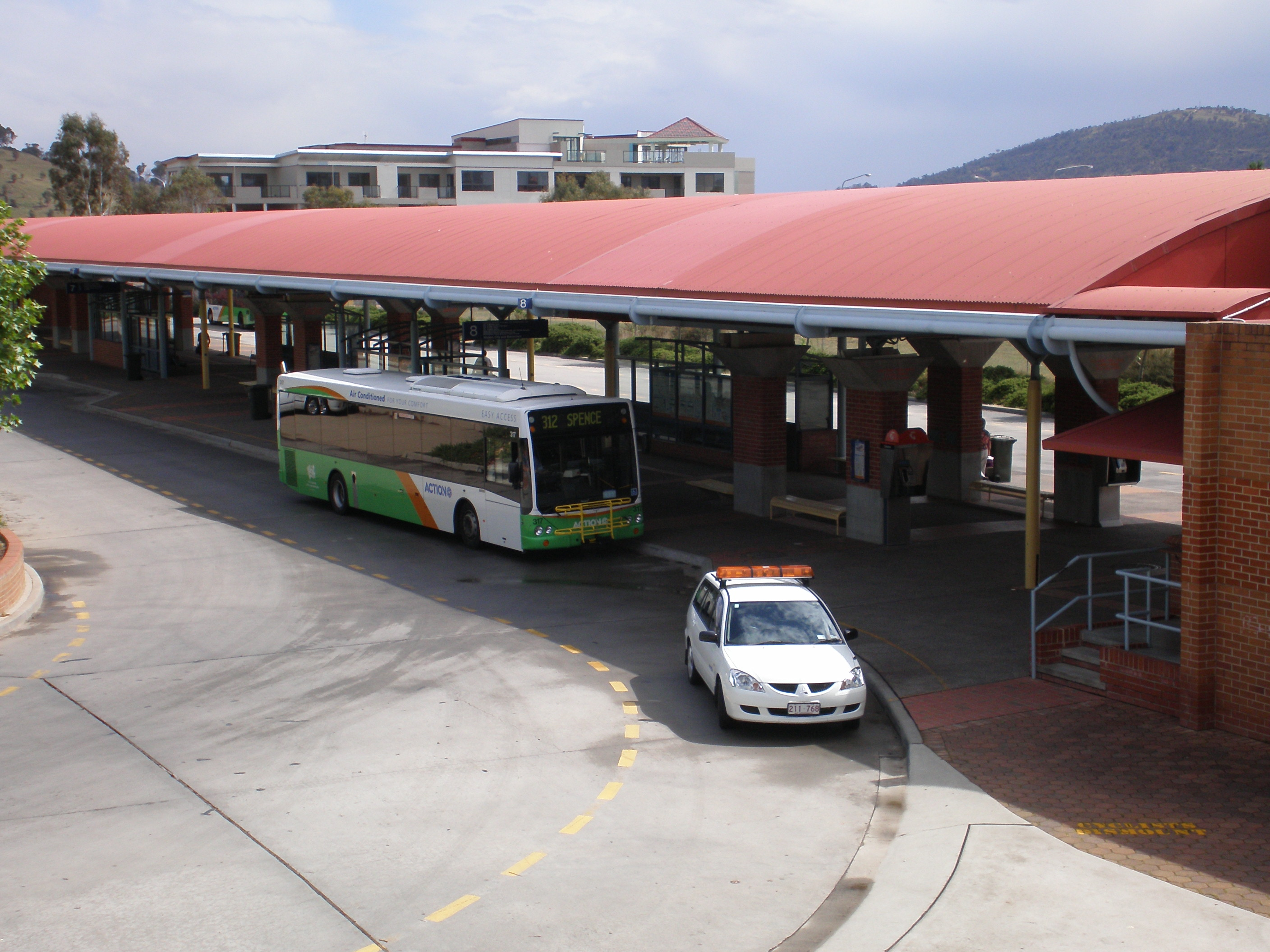
- An ACTION bus at the Tuggeranong Interchange

General information
- Location: Pitman Street, Tuggeranong Town Centre
- Coordinates: 35.4146°S 149.0655°E
- Owner: Transport Canberra
- Bus routes: 13
- Bus stands: 7
- Bus operators: ACTION

Other information
- Website: Transport Canberra

History
- Opened: 9 August 1991
Location

Tuggeranong Interchange is located in Tuggeranong Town Centre, Canberra. All services are operated by ACTION. It consists of 7 platforms and provides connections between bus routes servicing the District of Tuggeranong. The bus station is located next to South.Point Tuggeranong on a section of Pitman St between Holwell and Anketell Streets which is closed to regular vehicular traffic.

== History ==
Tuggeranong bus station opened on 9 August 1991. In April 2019 it was renamed Tuggeranong Interchange.

== Services ==
Tuggeranong Interchange is served by ACTION services.

Service	Destination	Notes
Platform 3
72	Woden Interchange	via Erindale Centre, Oxley
73	Woden Interchange	via Monash, Wanniassa
79	Calwell	via Isabella Plains, Theodore
Platform 4
70	Woden Interchange	via Kambah West, Cooleman Court
71	Woden Interchange	via Kambah East, Cooleman Court
80	Lanyon Marketplace	via Conder, Banks
81	Lanyon Marketplace	via Bonython, Gordon
Platform 5
74	Chisholm Loop	via Erindale Centre, Richardson
75	Chisholm Loop	via Richardson, Erindale Centre
77	Woden Interchange	via Gowrie, Erindale Centre
Platform 6
	School Services
Platform 7
76	Calwell	via Calwell, Erindale Centre
78	Richardson Loop	via Isabella Plains
Platform 8
R4	Belconnen	via Woden Interchange, City Interchange
Platform 9
	Special Events Services
