= Harbourside Shopping Centre =

Defunct shopping centre in Sydney, New South Wales, Australia

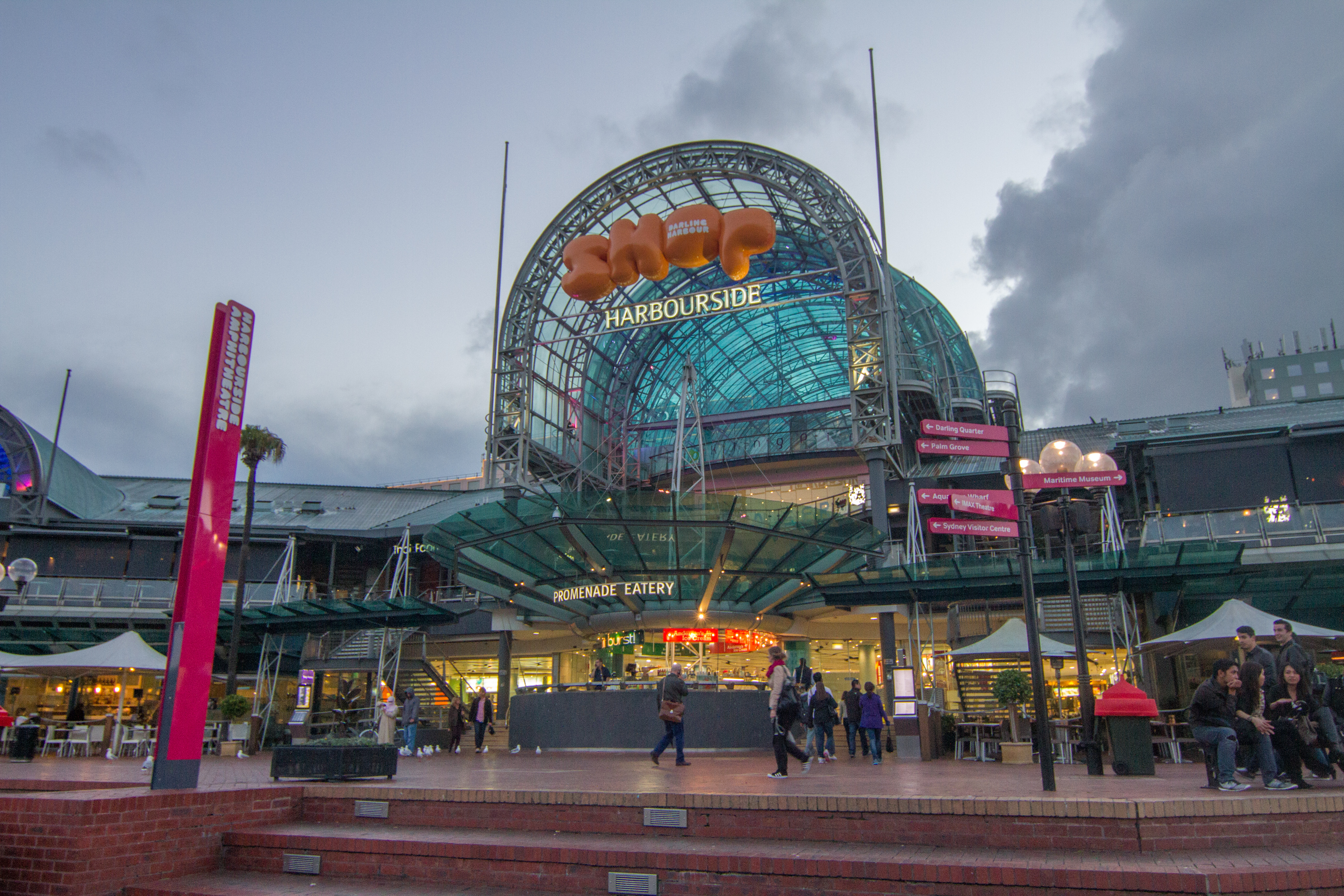
- Main entrance (August 2014)
- Location: Sydney, Australia
- Coordinates: 33°52′19″S 151°11′56″E
- Opened: 4 May 1988; 38 years ago
- Closed: 9 December 2022; 3 years ago
- Demolished: Early 2023–2024
- Previous names: Darling Harbourside Festival Marketplace
- Developer: Enterprise Development Co., The Hayson Group and Merlin International Properties Ltd.
- Manager: Mirvac
- Owner: Mirvac
- Architect: Clarke Perry Blackmore and RTKL Associates
- Num. of stores: 200+ (at peak)
- Floor area: 20,497 m^{2} (220,628 sq ft)
- Floors: 3
- Parking: 1,430 spaces
- Website: www.harbourside.com.au (2021 archive)

Harbourside was a shopping centre in Darling Harbour, Sydney, Australia. Built in 1988 as a festival marketplace and as part of the urban redevelopment of the Darling Harbour area during the 1980s, it was in close proximity to other notable buildings such as the Sydney Convention and Exhibition Centre and the Australian National Maritime Museum. On 9 December 2022, the centre closed permanently preceding its demolition. As of 2025, the site is being redeveloped as a mixed-use tower and retail complex.

== History ==
=== 1983–1988: Development and opening ===
In 1983, property developer Tom Hayson was appointed by then-premier Neville Wran to assist with the Darling Harbour redevelopment. Hayson was inspired by the American festival marketplace format pioneered by James W. Rouse, and believed a design similar to that of Harborplace and Faneuil Hall Marketplace could be implemented in Darling Harbour.

Hayson invited Rouse to Australia to discuss the project in 1984. Later that year Rouse called upon his principle planner Mort Hoppenfeld to help present the festival marketplace proposal to the government, so it could be included in the masterplan. But the masterplan was published the day before his arrival in Australia, excluding the festival marketplace. Hoppenfeld successfully advocated the proposal to Laurie Brereton, who took an executive decision to freeze the masterplan and appoint Hoppenfeld as the master planner for Darling Harbour.

The Hayson Group (later Merlin International Properties) won the development contract for Harbourside by tender in 1985. Architectural group Clarke Perry Blackmore worked with RTKL Associates to design the building. The design's centrepiece was an arched glass atrium, dubbed the 'Crystal Galleria' and inspired by The Crystal Palace in London. In 1987, Merlin International Properties appointed David Humphries as Director of Applied and Decorative Arts for Harbourside. Humphries coordinated the Public Art Squad, a team of over 40 artists, to create art instalments throughout the building. The most substantial piece was Oceania Fountain, a sculpture in the central atrium depicting dolphins on a globe, sculpted by Doug Hurr and painted by Garry Andrews. Among other notable works included terrazzo and pottery by Aboriginal artists Banduk Marika and Thancoupie.

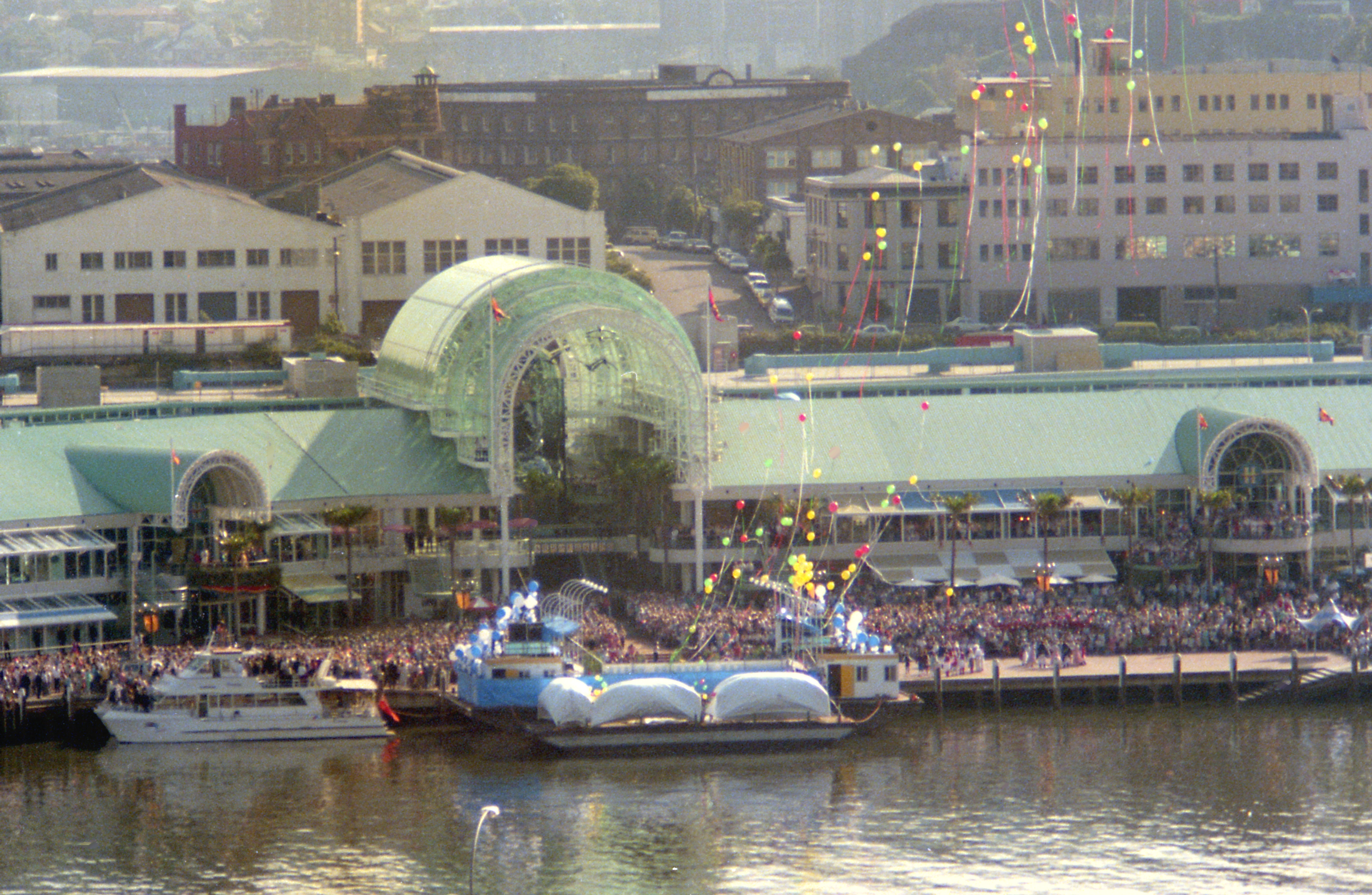
Opening by Queen Elizabeth II in May 1988. The celebration included a youth pageant and balloon release.

Harbourside was opened on 4 May 1988 by Queen Elizabeth II, in which she formally opened the Darling Harbour redevelopment as part of the Australian Bicentennial celebrations. Sydney Aquarium was the first attraction to open and was soon followed by a host of museums, shops, restaurants, hotels and bars. The centre was referred to as Darling Harbourside Festival Marketplace in its early years of operation, though the shorthand Harbourside later became more prevalent. The centre's initial slogan was There's nothing like it!. Darling Harbourside was also regarded as the first interpretation of the festival marketplace format outside of the United States.

=== 1989–2005 ===
A spring festival was hosted by KLM at Harbourside in September 1989, attracting over 15,000 visitors. The festival featured various aspects of Dutch culture, including thousands of imported tulips.

Malaysian investors Kar Wai Chan and Thomas Tiong acquired the centre for $111 million in 1995, and spent $70 million on a refurbishment in 1999. They commissioned Rice Daubney for the refurbishment plans, which converted the central atrium from being an open-air space to an enclosed one, and added 4,000 square metres of lettable area. As a result, the Oceania Fountain sculpture which occupied the atrium was removed and slated for disposal. Only the globe component of the sculpture was returned to the Public Art Squad after documentation of its creation was provided. Due to its scale, the sculpture could not be accommodated at their studio and was briefly at risk of being scrapped by Sims Metal before arrangements were made for its relocation to a paddock in Windsor. It was stored there for several years, eventually being repurposed as a local monument at 1378 Windsor Road, Grantham Farm.

Beville Group acquired the centre for $127 million in 2004. In 2005, Harbourside underwent a full refurbishment which unveiled a new and expanded food court, and an entertainment level which was home to a 20-lane Kingpin Bowling Centre, M9 Laser Skirmish and Australia's first Boeing 737-800 flight simulator, Flight Experience.

=== Redevelopment ===
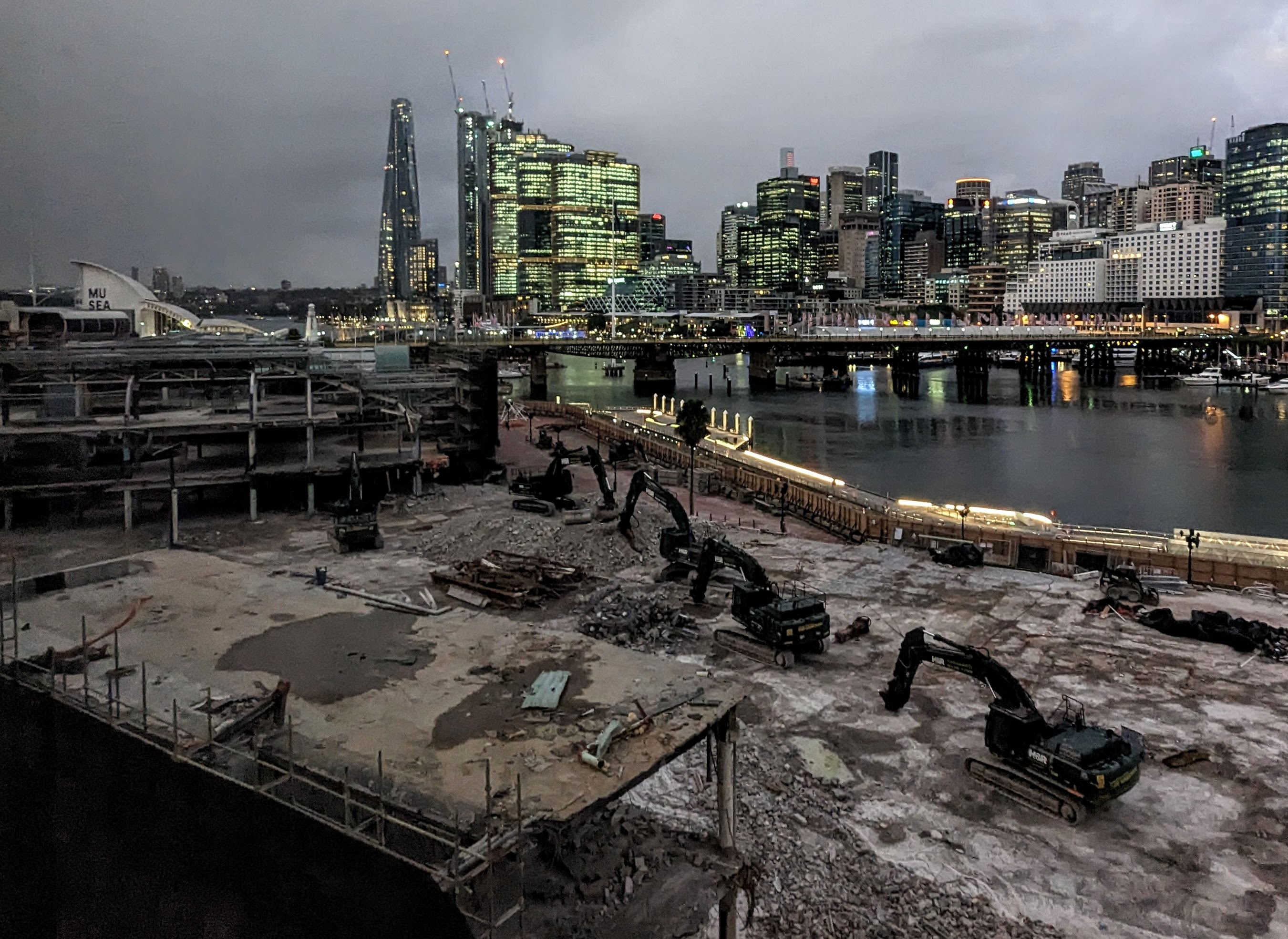
Demolition in April 2023

On 7 November 2013, Harbourside Shopping Centre was acquired by Mirvac for $252 million.

As part of the $3 billion project underway Mirvac planned for a significant new retail shopping centre and commercial office tower," documents, lodged with the Department of Planning & Environment as part of the Harbourside Shopping Centre development in 2015.

In August 2016, Mirvac dropped plans for an office complex at Darling Harbour and instead looked to build a taller, slimmer apartment tower as part of its proposed $400 million redevelopment of the Harbourside Shopping Centre.

In October 2020, Mirvac updated its plans for the new retail centre and apartments which will include a new public domain of over 8,200m². This redevelopment will include the demolition of the existing shopping centre and removal of the existing pedestrian bridge over Darling Drive and the old monorail station. The development will include a mixture of non-residential and residential uses, including a new shopping centre containing retail and restaurants, residential apartments and public open spaces.

The centre closed on 9 December 2022 and demolition commenced in early 2023. By late 2023, construction began on the new mixed use tower and retail complex on the same site; Harbourside Residences.

== Tenants ==
Harbourside had 20,497 square metres (220,630 sq ft) of floor space prior to its closure in 2022. The major attractions included Kingpin bowling alley (includes M9 Laser Skirmish), Australia's first retail Jet flight simulator, RaceCentre, 9D motion moving cinema and Hard Rock Cafe (Sydney's only restaurant). The Hard Rock Cafe opened its 500-seat venue at Harbourside in 2011, as a revival of its previous location in Darlinghurst (which had closed in 2007).

Upon its opening in 1988, Harbourside offered over 15,000m² of retail space across 232 individual tenancies, including 92 small tenancies in an area known as the Bazaar. Among the notable tenants was Virgin Records, a British-based chain of record stores, which opened its first location outside the UK at Harbourside. A 320-seater Ettamogah restaurant opened in Harbourside in 1997, though its tenancy was short-lived.

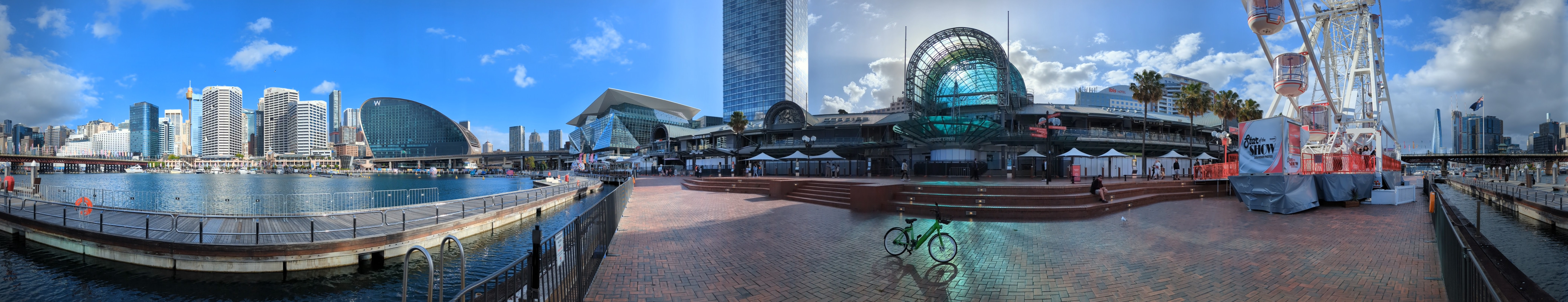
Panoramic view of Harbourside shopping centre and Darling Harbour cityscape
