= R4 (Canberra) =

Bus route in Canberra, Australia

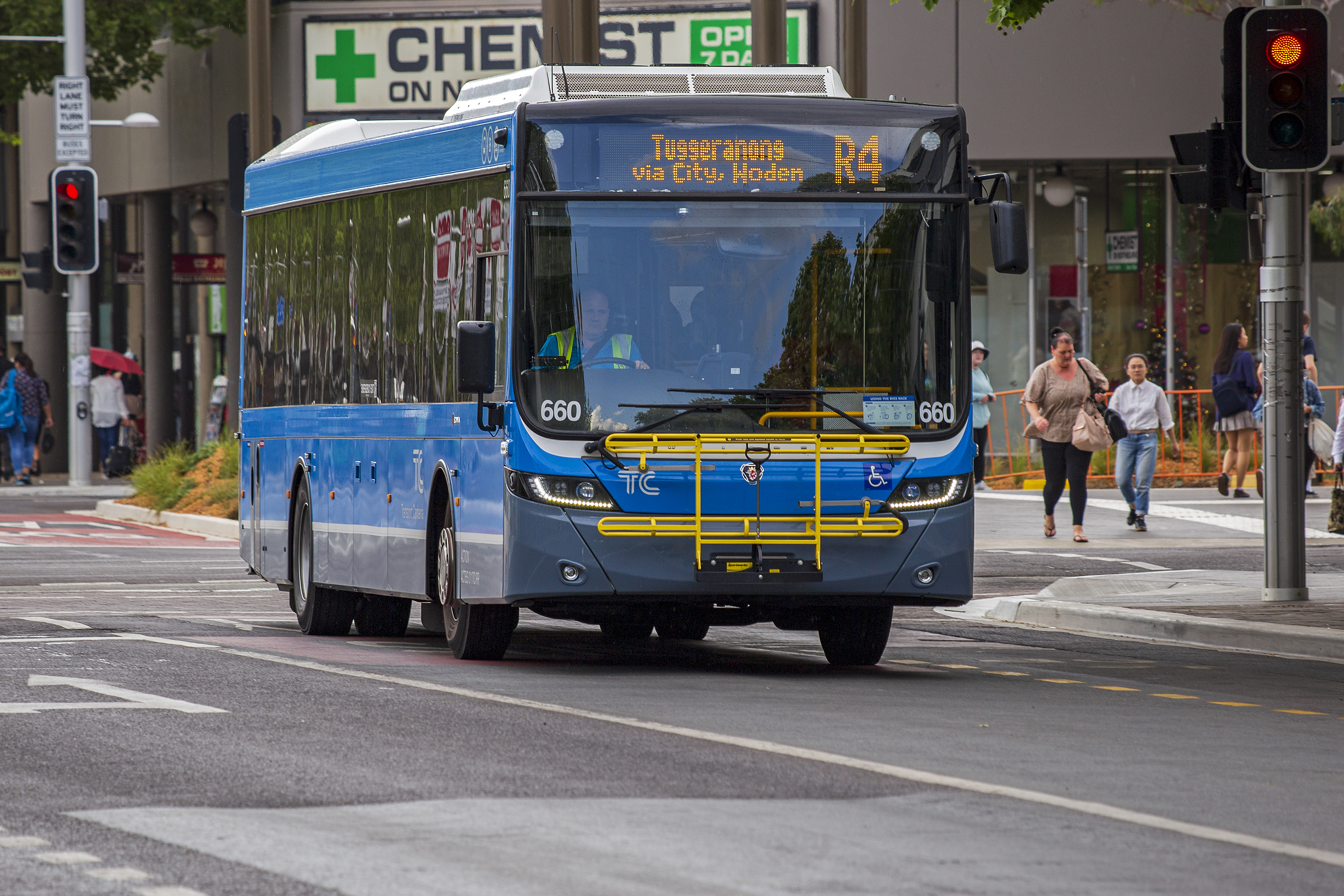

Overview
- Operator: ACTION
- Began service: 29 April 2019
- Predecessors: Blue Rapid

Route
- Start: Cohen Street Bus Station
- Via: Westfield Belconnen; University of Canberra; North Canberra Hospital; Australian National University; City Interchange; Albert Hall
- End: Tuggeranong Interchange

Service
- Level: Daily
- Timetable: Route R4

Route R4 is a main cross-city bus route in Canberra, Australia operated by ACTION between Belconnen, City, Woden Town Centre and Tuggeranong.

== History ==
The origins of the route can be traced back to the introduction by ACTION of bus services between Canberra City Centre and the growing Woden Valley and Tuggeranong regions in the 1970s. In January 1989, the Intertown brand was introduced on cross-city route 333 between Belconnen and Tuggeranong. In 1998 route 333 was split into six separate routes with each operating beyond Tuggeranong to different termini.

The Blue Rapid brand was introduced in November 2010. Route 300 was introduced on weekends on 7 October 2017. It had a sister service known as the Red Rapid with a further seven originally planned to be introduced by 2018. The Blue Rapid branding was discontinued on 29 April 2019 and it was rebranded as route R4 to coincide with the addition of eight rapid bus routes and the light rail.

On weekdays, route R4 operates at a 5 to 10 minute frequency between 07:00 and 19:00 with a 15 minute frequency until midnight. On weekends, it operates at a 15 minute frequency from first to last service.

== Bus Stations ==
Route R4 serves the following bus stations which are located in different districts.

=== Cohen Street Interchange ===
Northbound services stop at platform 6 and southbound services at platform 3. The bus station is located adjacent to Belconnen bus depot.

=== Westfield Belconnen ===
Northbound services stop at platform 2 and southbound services at platform 1. The bus station is located on the Lathlain Street entrance of Westfield Belconnen.

=== Belconnen Interchange ===
Northbound services stop at platform 4 and southbound services at platform 1.

=== City Interchange ===
Northbound services stop at platform 1 and southbound services at platform 4 with connections to CDC Canberra services to Queanbeyan and Yass.

City Interchange is located on East Row and Alinga Street. Connection is available to the Canberra Light Rail to Gungahlin.

=== Woden Interchange ===
At Woden Interchange, northbound services stop at platform B and southbound services stop at platform A with connections to Qcity Transit and Transborder Express services.

=== Tuggeranong Interchange ===
At Tuggeranong Interchange, northbound services stop at platform 8 and southbound services arrive at platform 2.
