= Erindale Centre =

Shopping center in Australia

Coordinates: 35.403°S 149.099°E

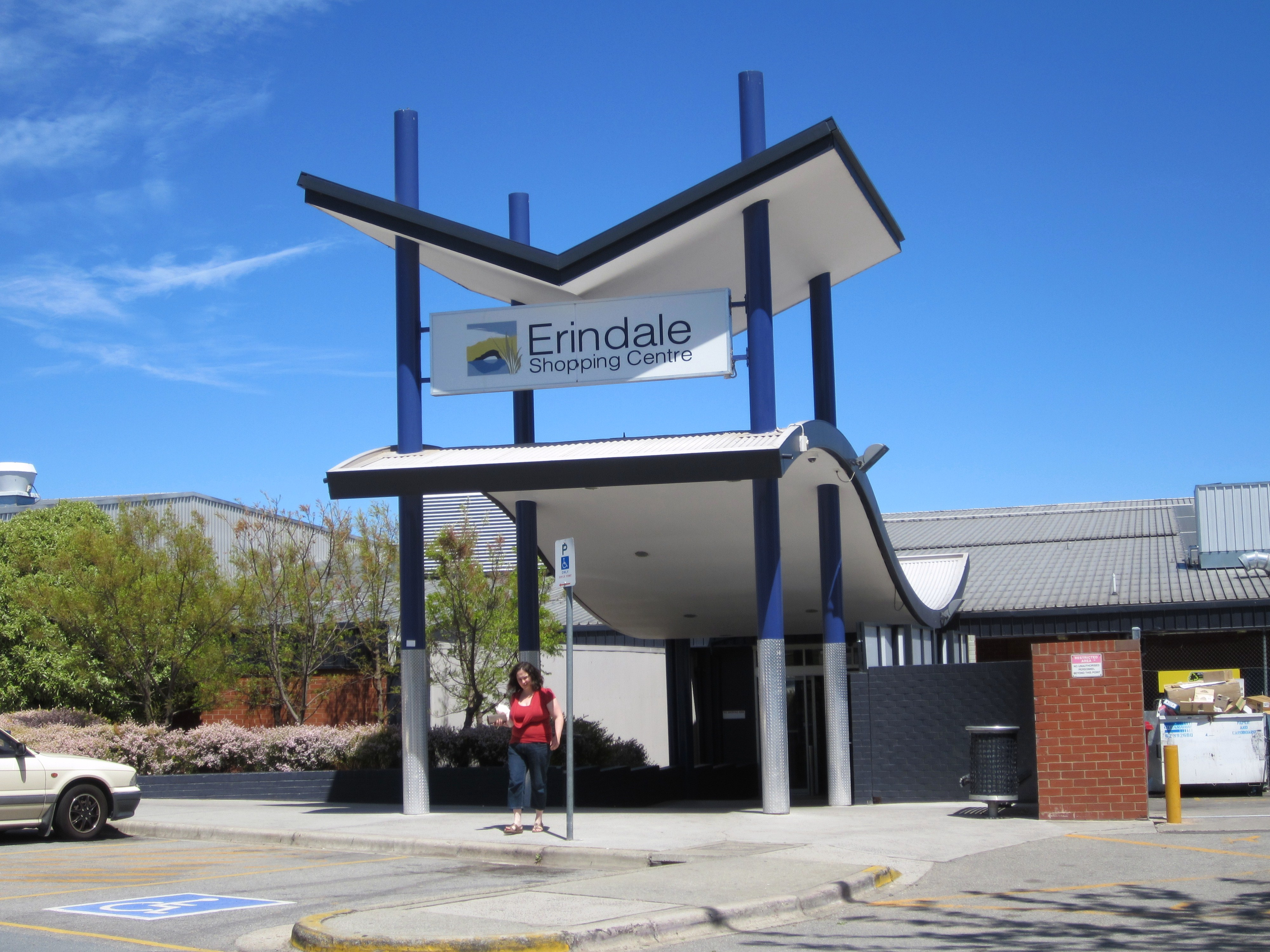
Northern entrance of the Erindale shopping centre

Erindale Shopping Centre (/ˈɛrɪndeɪl/) is a small shopping centre located in the Tuggeranong suburb of Wanniassa in the Canberra region of Australia. It stands on the former site of the Erindale Homestead for which it is named, and comprises 121,815.17 m^{2} (1,311,207.6 sq ft) of both indoor and outdoor area with 76 stores, restaurants, cafes, and entertainment venues.

== History ==
Erinale may have been named "Erinvale". It was labelled with this name on a 1936 map.

Erindale Shopping Centre was first developed in 1985, two years before the Tuggeranong Hyperdome. It was intended as a “district retail centre”, to serve the Tuggeranong area. The land mass of Erindale was initially gazetted by the ACT Government with many independent retailers purchasing properties, but was later purchased by Charter Hall and operated as a neighbourhood shopping centre under their name. In the early 2010s, the centre was revitalised to include a new bus station, which was serviced as a terminus by several of ACTION's southbound bus routes, and a modernized facade, as well as the addition of three new retail locations inside the indoor building on Denigan Street.

In 2019, Savills invested an undisclosed amount into the centre, purchasing its operations and managing it independently.

== Extra reading ==
- Reynolds, Peter (29 September 2009). "Call for planning for Erindale". The CanberraTimes. ProQuest 1020403567.
- Violante, Victor (29 September 2009). "Greens push through Erindale master plan". The CanberraTimes. Greens succeed in getting the government to develop a master plan for Erindale.
- "Providing a safe environment for young people in Erindale". The Canberra Times. Canberra, A.C.T. 18 March 2009. p. 22.
- "Fed-up Erindale traders might hire own security". The Canberra Times. 9 March 2006. p. 2.
- "McDonalds franchise fined over safety breach" (Document). Sydney: ABC Premium News. 14 April 2004. ProQuest 457853691.
- Reynolds, Peter (18 October 2011). "Supermarket opposition". The Canberra Times. p. 1. opposition to a second supermarket
- "One of Canberra's best-kept secrets". The Canberra Times. 18 March 2009. p. 20. ProQuest 1020444328. Shopping centre was refurbished in 2001.
- "Improvements underway". The Canberra Times. 4 March 2008. A new community garden between Erindale College and the Shops was organised by Communities@Work, Gugan Gulwan Youth Aboriginal Corporation and ACT Department of Territory and Municipal Services.
- Clack, Peter (19 December 1999). "Land Auction A $3.8m Boost". The Canberra Times. p. 2. ProQuest 1012250497. The ACT government failed to sell the site of the Erindale Police Station.
- Centenera, Jeff (19 September 2000). "Boost For ACT Aboriginal Businesses". The Canberra Times. Canberra, A.C.T. p. 4. The Ngunnawal ACT and District Indigenous Peoples Aboriginal Corporation planned to move to the former police station.
- Lynne Minion (24 December 2007). "YouTube doctor after a remedy". The Canberra Times. p. 10. ProQuest 1019943983. Obstetrician Doug Lee opened the Erindale Medical Practice in the late 1980s; recently tried to recruit doctors for it on YouTube.
- Clack, Peter (13 February 1998). "Closed Again: Pool-bug Cases Hit 139". The Canberra Times. ProQuest 1012387932. A cryptosporidium outbreak scare closed Erindale pool on 4 February 1998.
