= Renault R312 =

Bus model

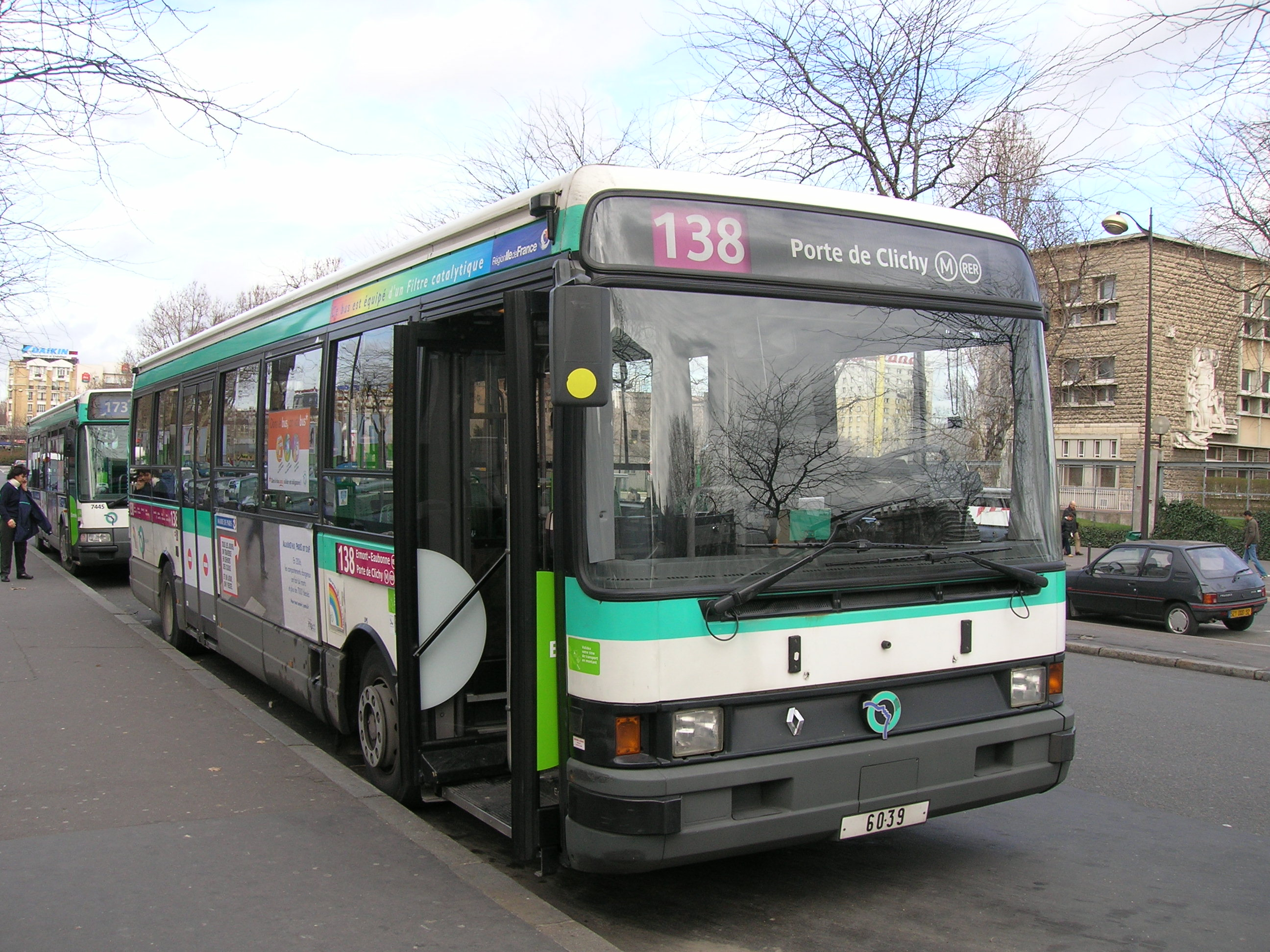
- RATP Renault R312 in Paris in March 2007

Overview
- Manufacturer: Renault Trucks
- Production: 1987-1996

Body and chassis
- Doors: 2 or 3
- Floor type: Step entrance

Powertrain
- Engine: 9.8 litres
- Power output: 152 kW (207 PS; 204 hp); 187 kW (254 PS; 251 hp)
- Transmission: ZF 4 HP 50

Dimensions
- Length: 12.00 m (472.4 in)
- Width: 2.50 m (98.4 in)
- Height: 3.10 m (122.0 in)
- Curb weight: 11,450 kg (25,240 lb)

Chronology
- Predecessor: Renault PR100; Saviem SC 10
- Successor: Irisbus Agora

The Renault R312 is a bus manufactured by Renault Trucks from 1987 to 1996. A prototype was completed in 1984. It succeeded the SC 10, which was originally a Saviem design from the 1960s.

The 12m long bus is rear-engined, powered by a 6-cylinder Renault turbo-diesel engine with a displacement of 9.8 litres available with either 152 kW (207 PS; 204 hp) or 187 kW (254 PS; 251 hp). By placing the engine in the rear, the interior was flat over the vehicle's whole length. It was primarily built as an integral bus, although some were completed as rolling chassis.

The bus was popular in France, with over 4,000 produced, with RATP operating over 1,500 during the 1990s. In Australia, the Renault PR100.3 has the same visual appearance as the R312. Export sales were made to Germany, Italy and Switzerland.
