= South.Point Tuggeranong =

Shopping center in Greenway, Australia

Coordinates: 35.4164°S 149.0664°E

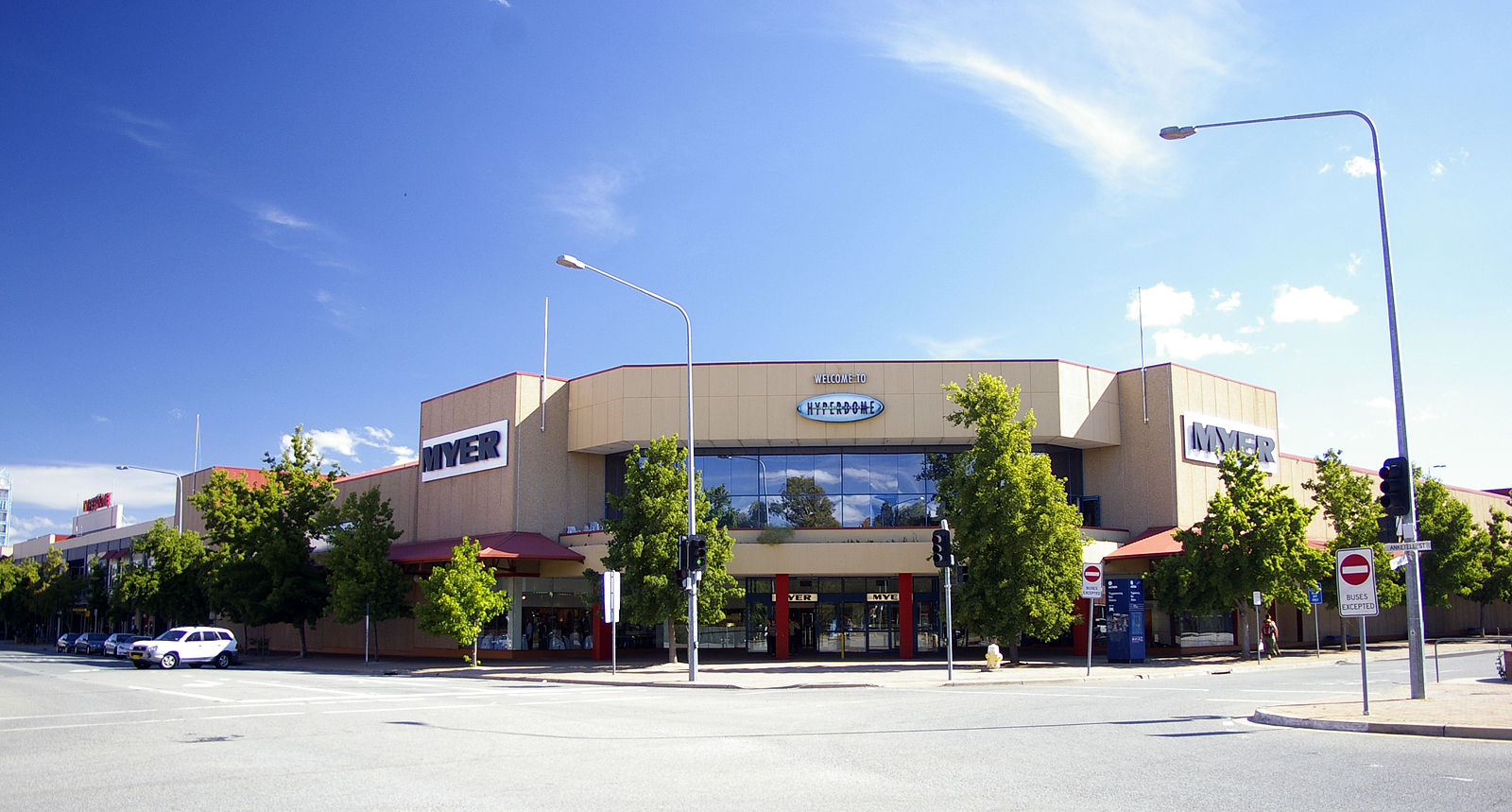
- South.Point with its previous Hyperdome signage
- Location: Tuggeranong, Australian Capital Territory, Australia
- Opened: 1987; 39 years ago
- Manager: Leda Holdings Pty Ltd
- Owner: Leda Holdings Pty Ltd
- Num. of stores: 183
- Num. of anchor tenants: 7
- Floor area: 56,175 m^{2} (604,660 sq ft)
- Floors: 2
- Parking: 2,400 (three level multistorey with one underground level)
- Website: southpointcanberra.com.au

South.Point Tuggeranong (previously Tuggeranong Hyperdome) is a two-storey regional shopping centre located in Greenway, Australian Capital Territory, servicing the district of Tuggeranong.

== Ownership ==
South.Point Tuggeranong is a regional shopping centre with a Gross Lettable Area of 70,298 square metres. The centre was established in 1987 and is managed by Leda Holdings.

== History ==
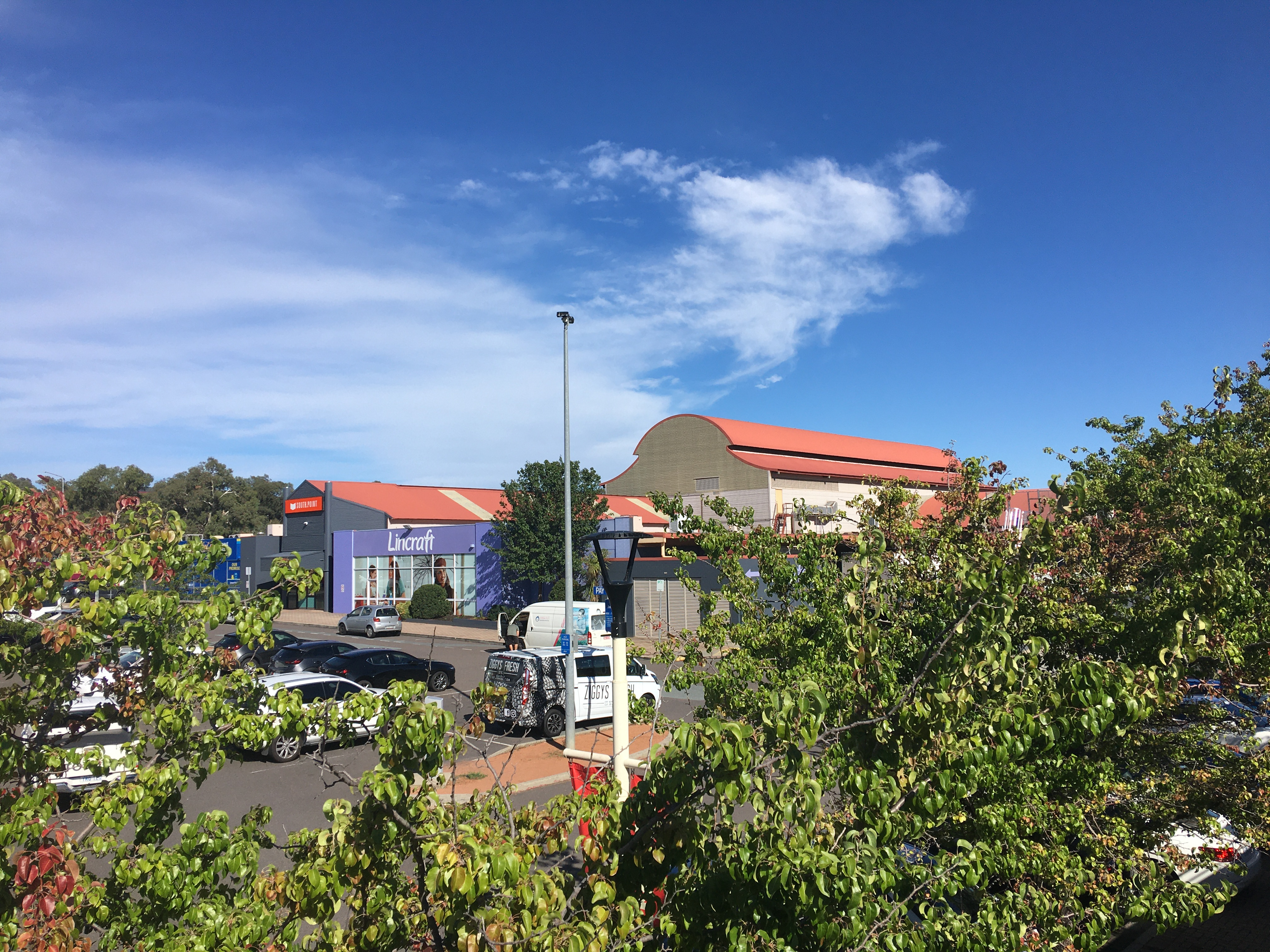
Tuggeranong Lifestyle Centre

It was officially opened in 1987 as Hyperdome Shopping Centre and has had incremental expansions over time. It underwent subsequent development and expansion between 1997 and 1999. It was designed by the architects of Donald Crone and Associates. The nearby Tuggeranong Markets were built in the 1990s, but they eventually became part of the Hyperdome site as the Tuggeranong Lifestyle Centre. In 2006 when Centro became managers as well as part owners of the shopping centre, a minor redevelopment of the shopping centre was completed. The development included refurbishment of the inner and outer facades, additional retail stores, new Centro Signature sections and construction also began on a new dining and entertainment precinct along Anketell Street. This outdoor precinct was later named SouthLife on Anketell. From 1 December 2016 Leda Holdings regained full ownership and management of the centre. It was renamed South.Point on 10 May 2018. (although many locals who lived in the area before May 2018 still call it the Hyperdome).

== Retailers ==
Major retailers in the main centre include:

- Coles supermarket (4,712m²)
- Kmart discount department store (7,568m²)
- Target discount department store (6,566m²)
- Woolworths supermarket (5,568m²)
- Big W discount department store (6,996m²)
- Harris Scarfe discount department store
- JB-Hi-Fi Home Electronics Store
- TK Maxx discount department store
- Rebel sports store
- Limelight cinema complex
- The Reject Shop discount variety store
- Myer department store (formerly, closed in 2012)

Major retailers in the Lifestyle Centre include:

- Lincraft craft store
- The Good Guys appliance store
- Best Friends Pets store

South.Point is also home to 183 specialty retailers, eateries and service providers.

== Location and transport ==
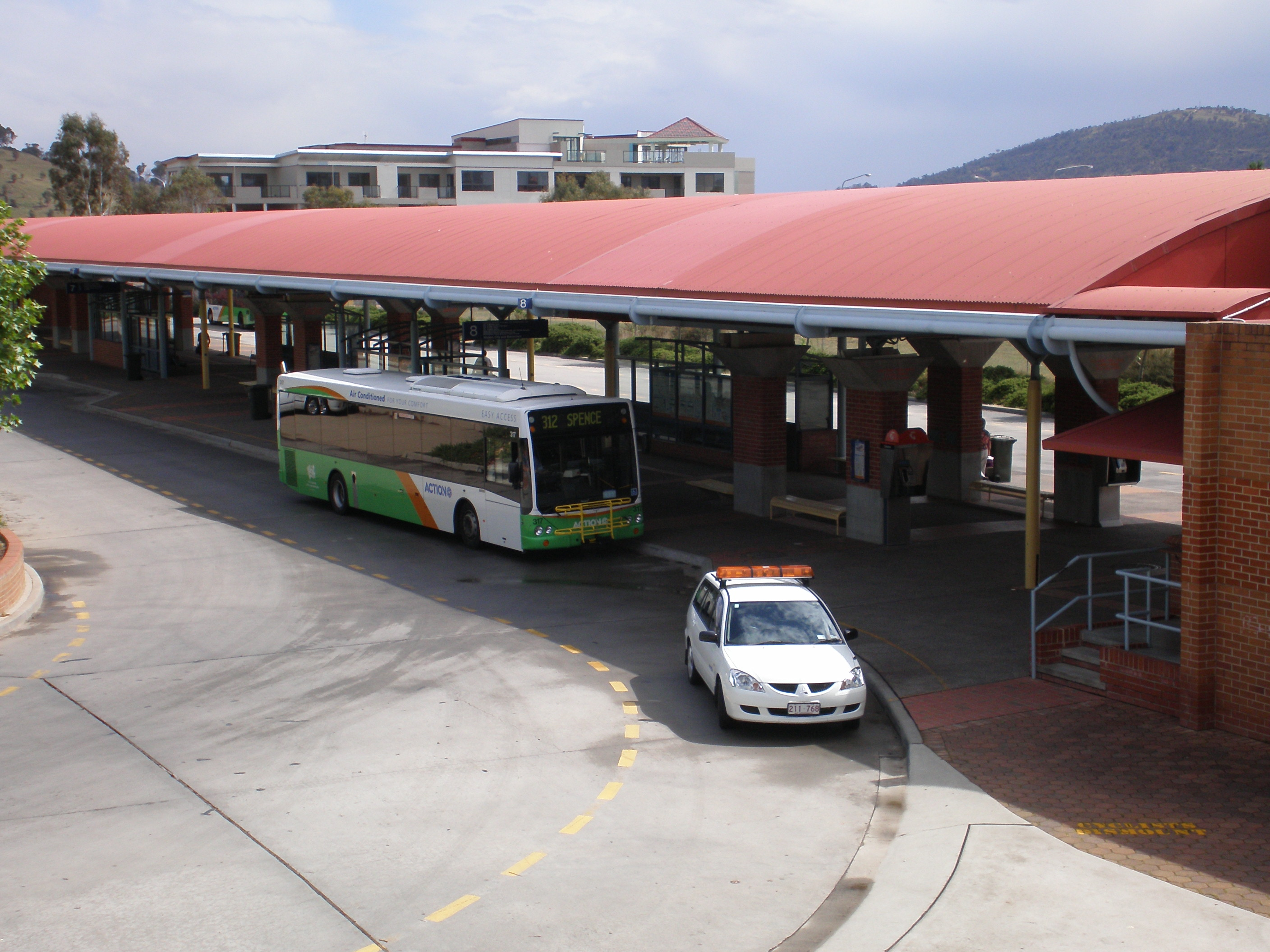
Tuggeranong Interchange

South.Point is central to the Tuggeranong Town Centre. The centre faces onto Anketell Street to the east, Pitman Street to the north and Reed Street to the south. Between the main centre and Athllon Drive, to the west, is an additional building known as the Tuggeranong Lifestyle Centre. Between the Lifestyle Centre and the main building, there is an outdoor food court known as The Point. Access to 2,366 parking spaces is off Pitman and Reed Streets. Tuggeranong Interchange on the other side of Pitman Street is served by ACTION.
