= Cooleman Court =

Australian sub-regional shopping centre

Coordinates: 35.3412°S 149.0528°E

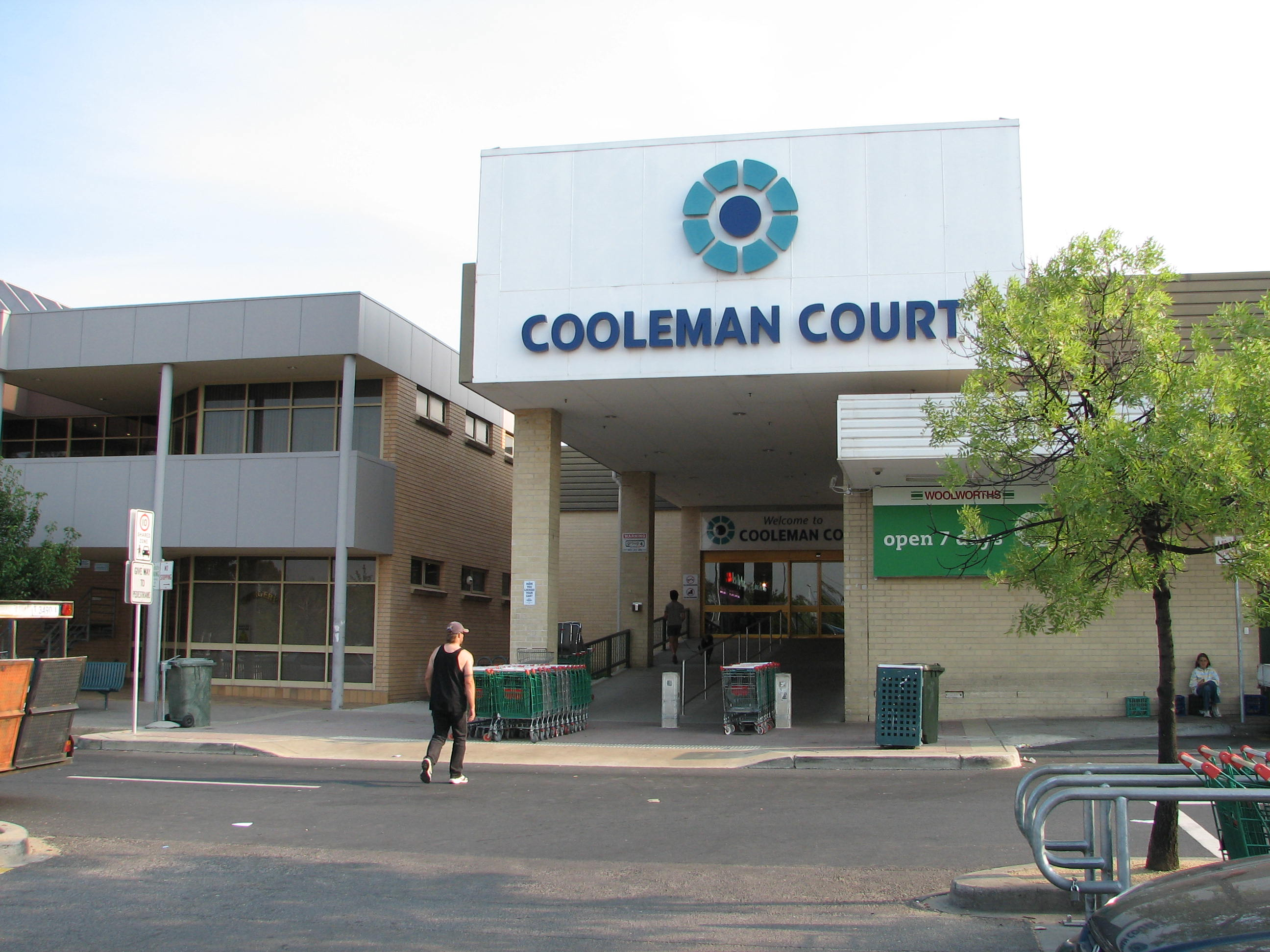
- Location: Weston Creek, Australian Capital Territory, Australia
- Address: Brierly Street, Weston ACT 2611, Australia.
- Opened: 1978
- Renovated: 2009, 2021, 2024
- Developer: Mirvac
- Owner: Region Group
- Num. of stores: 35
- Num. of anchor tenants: 2
- Floor area: 10,155 m^{2} (109,310 sq ft)
- Floors: 4
- Parking: 512
- Public transit: Cooleman Court Interchange
- Website: coolemancourt.com.au

Cooleman Court, sometimes known colloquially as "Coolo", is a sub-regional shopping centre located in the Weston Creek suburb of Weston, Australia. Cooleman Court offers a total of 35 stores, spanning indoor and outdoor space, replicating something of a town square. Its major tenants are Woolworths and Aldi Süd. Other retailers in the centre include The Reject Shop, Best & Less, Bakers Delight and BWS.

== History ==
Cooleman Court was opened in 1978 as a neighbourhood shopping centre, designed to contrast and compete with the already-existing Woden Plaza (now Westfield Woden). Its only major tenant was Woolworths, and was designed to serve the western suburbs of Woden and the far-northern suburbs of Tuggeranong.

During the late 1990s, development began to expand the Centre outwards, including buildings to house the Weston Raiders Club, a Caltex service station (now Ampol), and what is now known as the Weston Arcade. It would introduce the Target discount department store, among many other retailers, making the Centre form to serve entire regions rather than a set of suburbs. The shopping centre was renovated and extended in 2009.

In early 2019, a Master Plan was announced by Mirvac to expand the Centre to the north, and create an additional space to house the Fresh Food and Dining districts, and easier access to the carpark. This new section was opened in early 2020. The current floor area of the centre is 10,155 m^{2} (109,310 sq ft).

As part of nationwide restructuring, the Target store closed in mid 2021.

Cooleman Court was bought from Mirvac by Region Group in June 2024.
