= ACTION =

Bus operator in Canberra, Australia

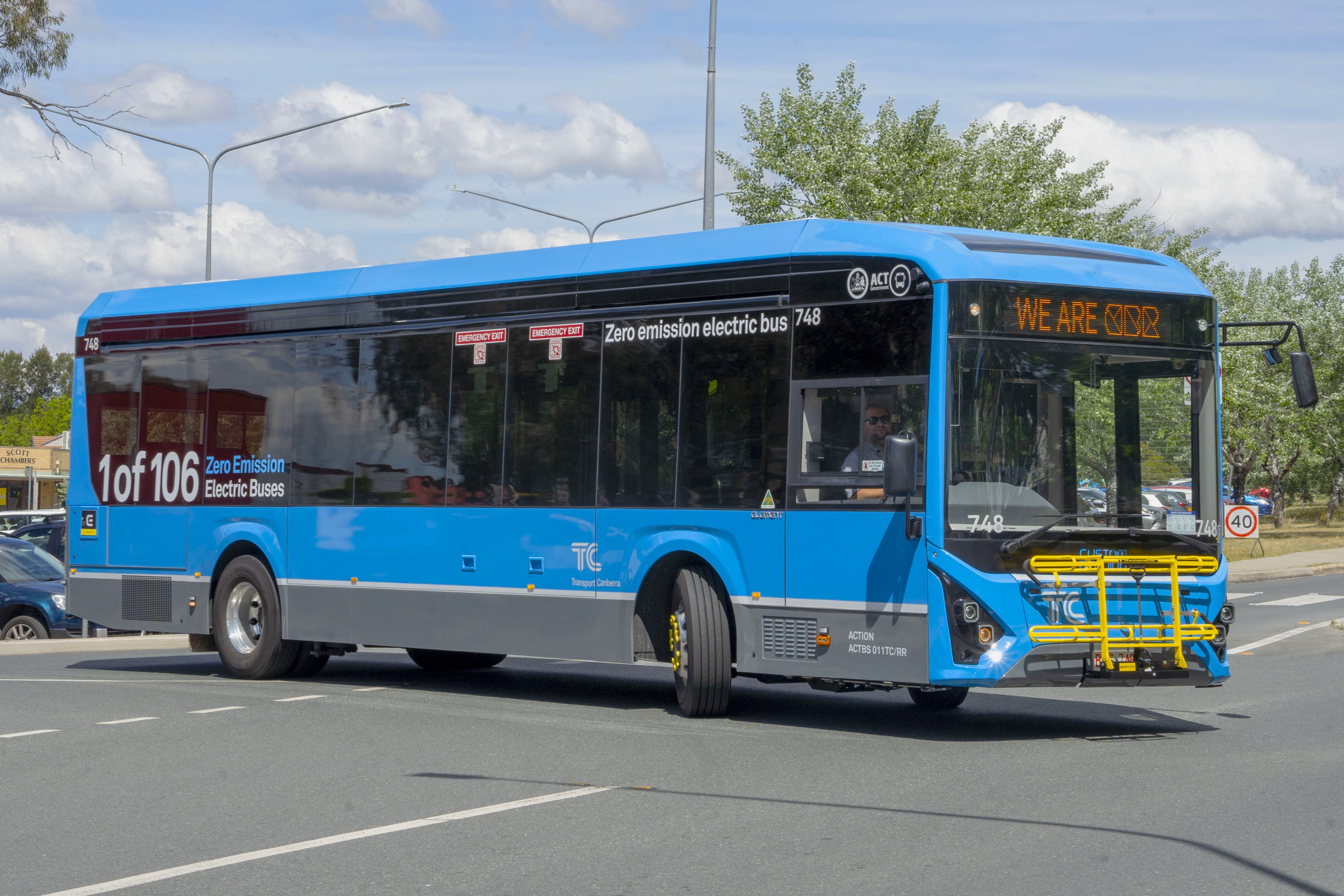
- An ACTION Custom Denning Element at Kippax Interchange in November 2024
- Parent: Transport Canberra & City Services
- Commenced operation: 19 July 1926
- Headquarters: Greenway
- Locale: Canberra
- Service type: Bus services
- Hubs: City Interchange
- Depots: 3
- Fleet: 454 (June 2026)
- Annual ridership: 17.8 million (2015/16)
- Chief Operating Officer: Bren Burkevics
- Website: www.transport.act.gov.au

ACTION (Australian Capital Territory Internal Omnibus Network) is a bus operator in Canberra, Australia, owned by the Government of the Australian Capital Territory.

== History ==
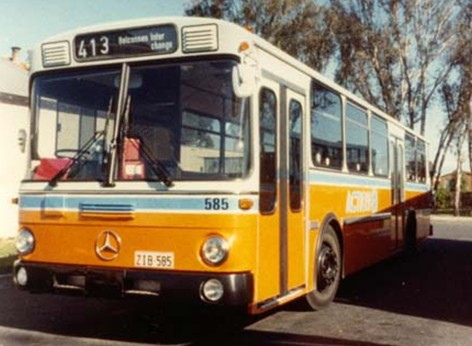
Ansair bodied Mercedes-Benz O305 at Spence in 1982

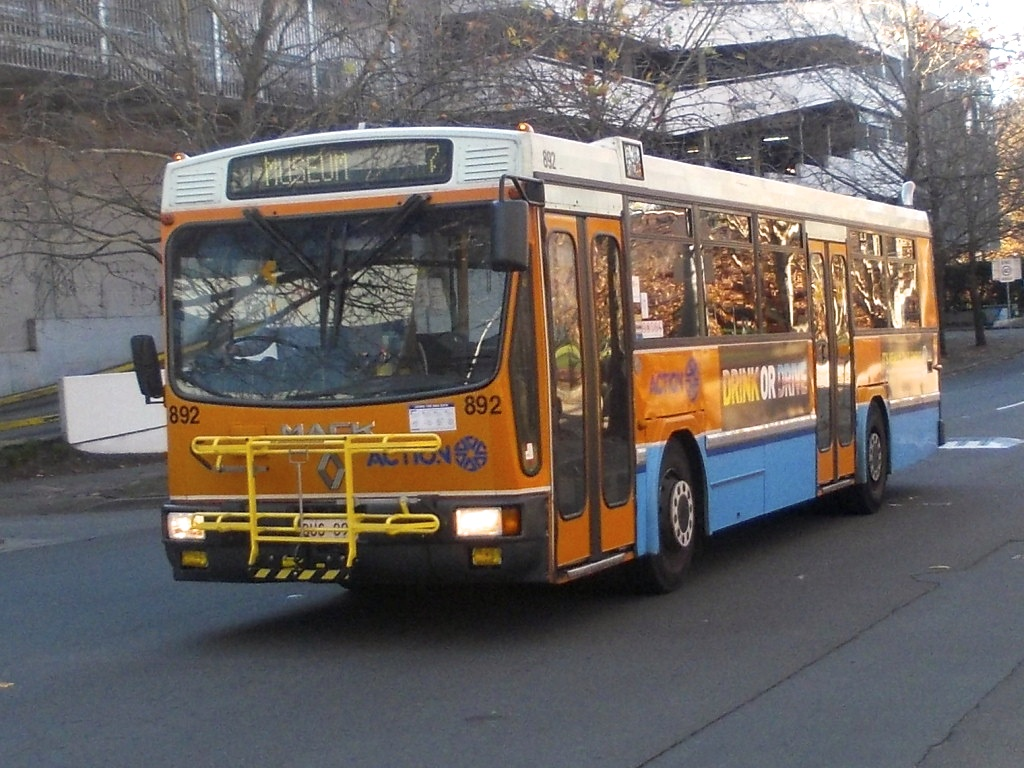
Ansair bodied Renault PR100.2

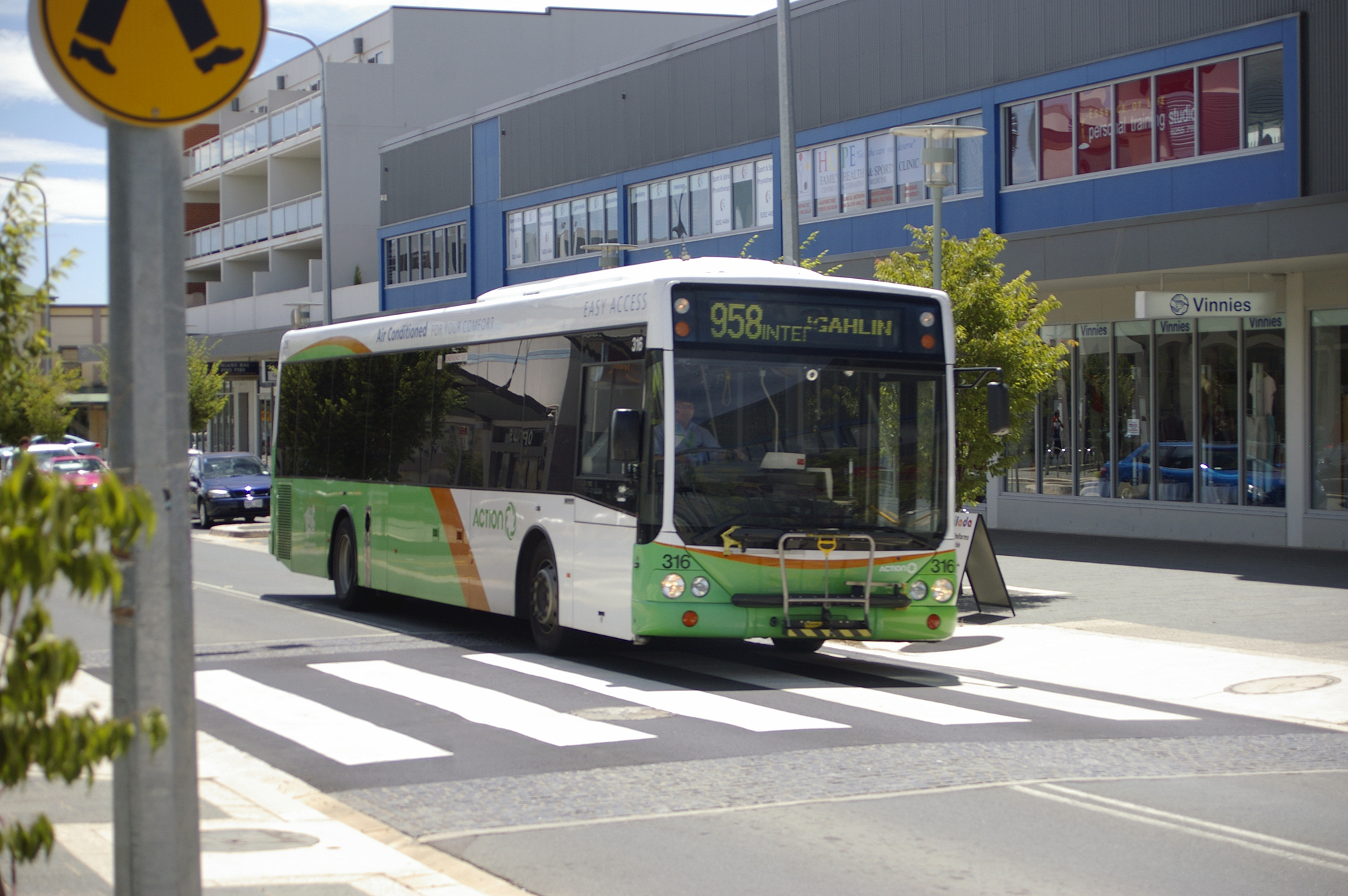
Custom Coaches bodied Irisbus Agora Line at Gungahlin Town Centre in January 2010

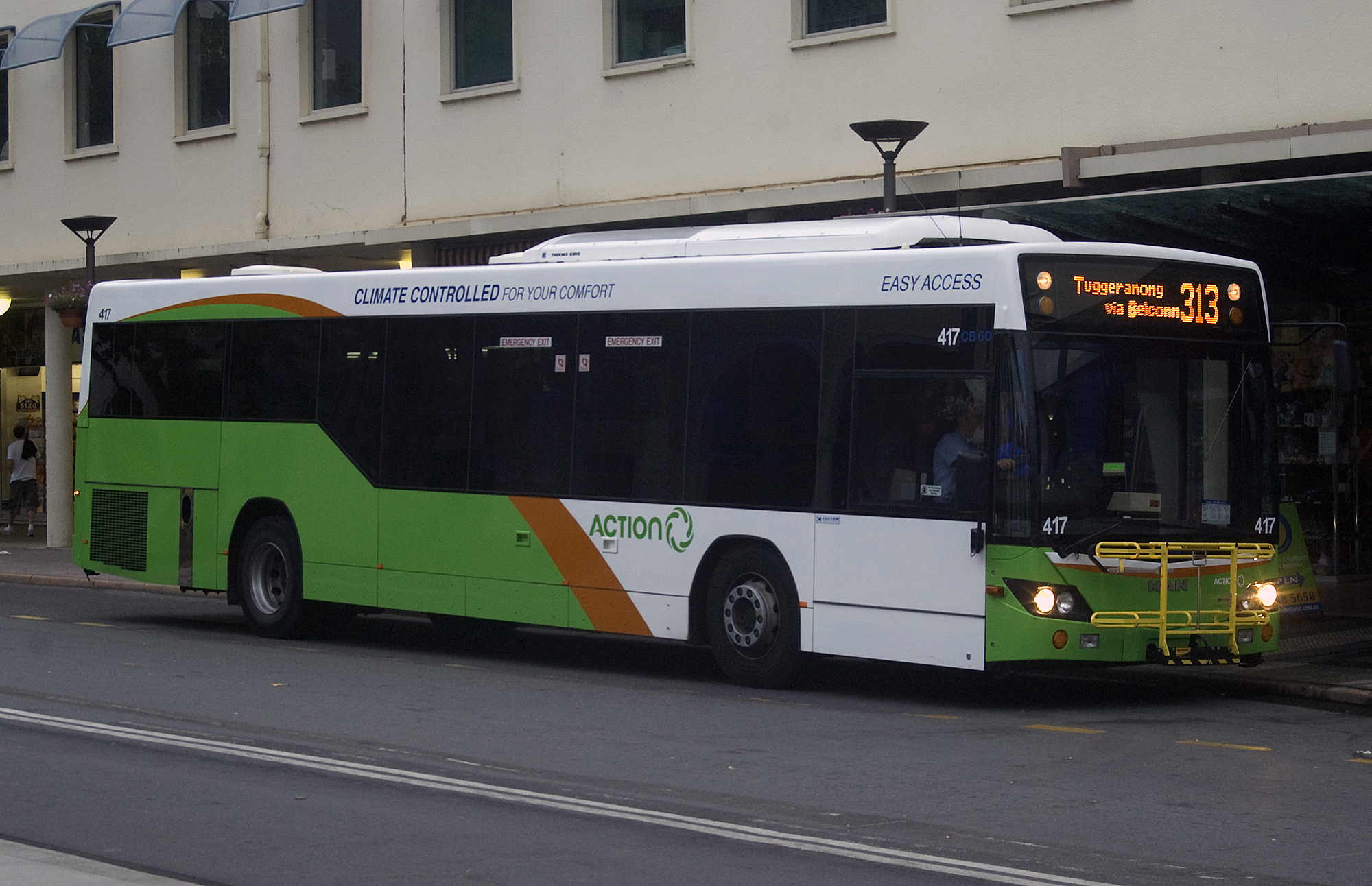
Custom Coaches bodied MAN 18.320 on Blue Rapid route 313

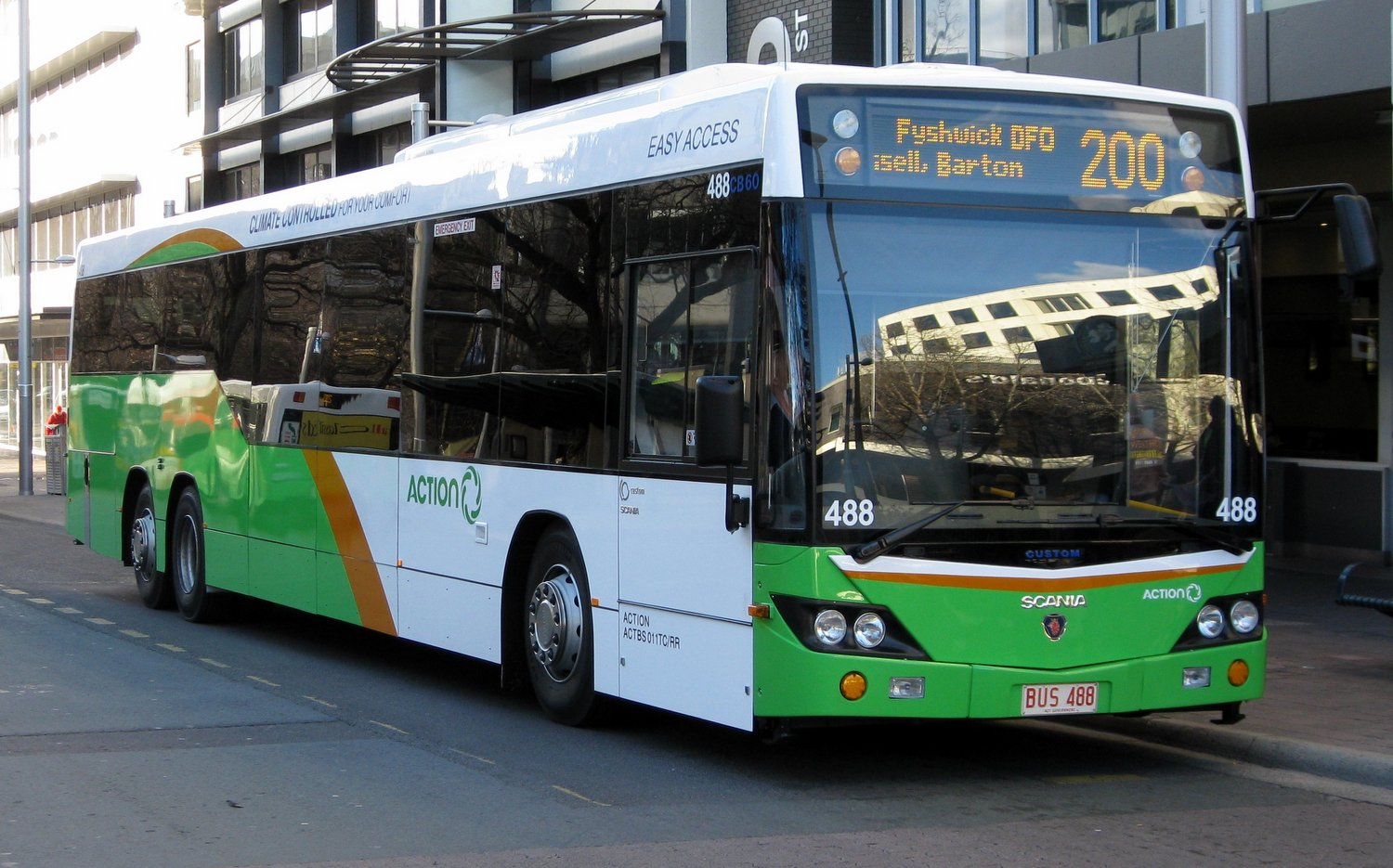
Custom Coaches bodied Scania K320UB at City Interchange in July 2012

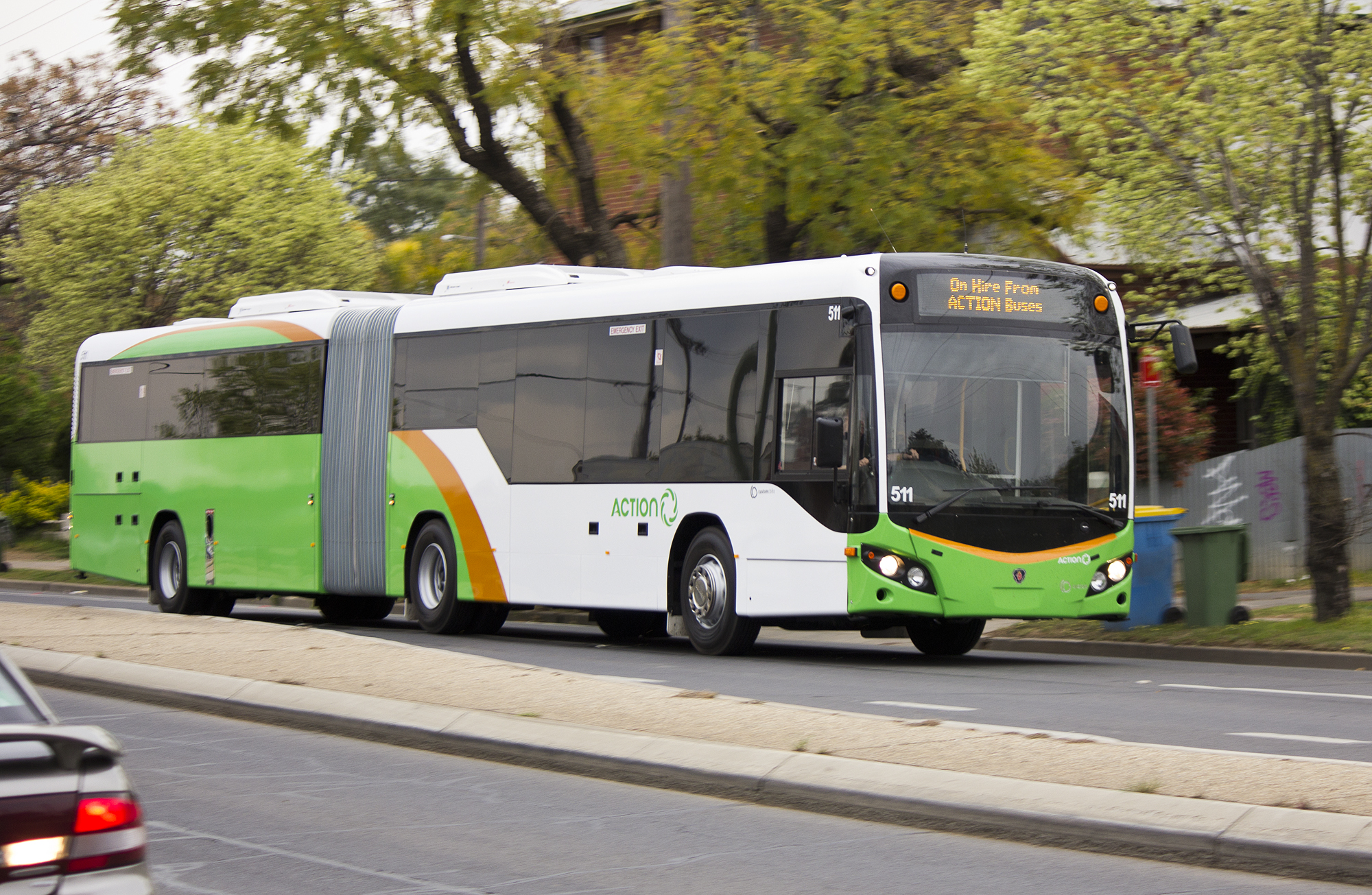
Custom Coaches bodied Scania K360UA in Wagga Wagga in September 2012

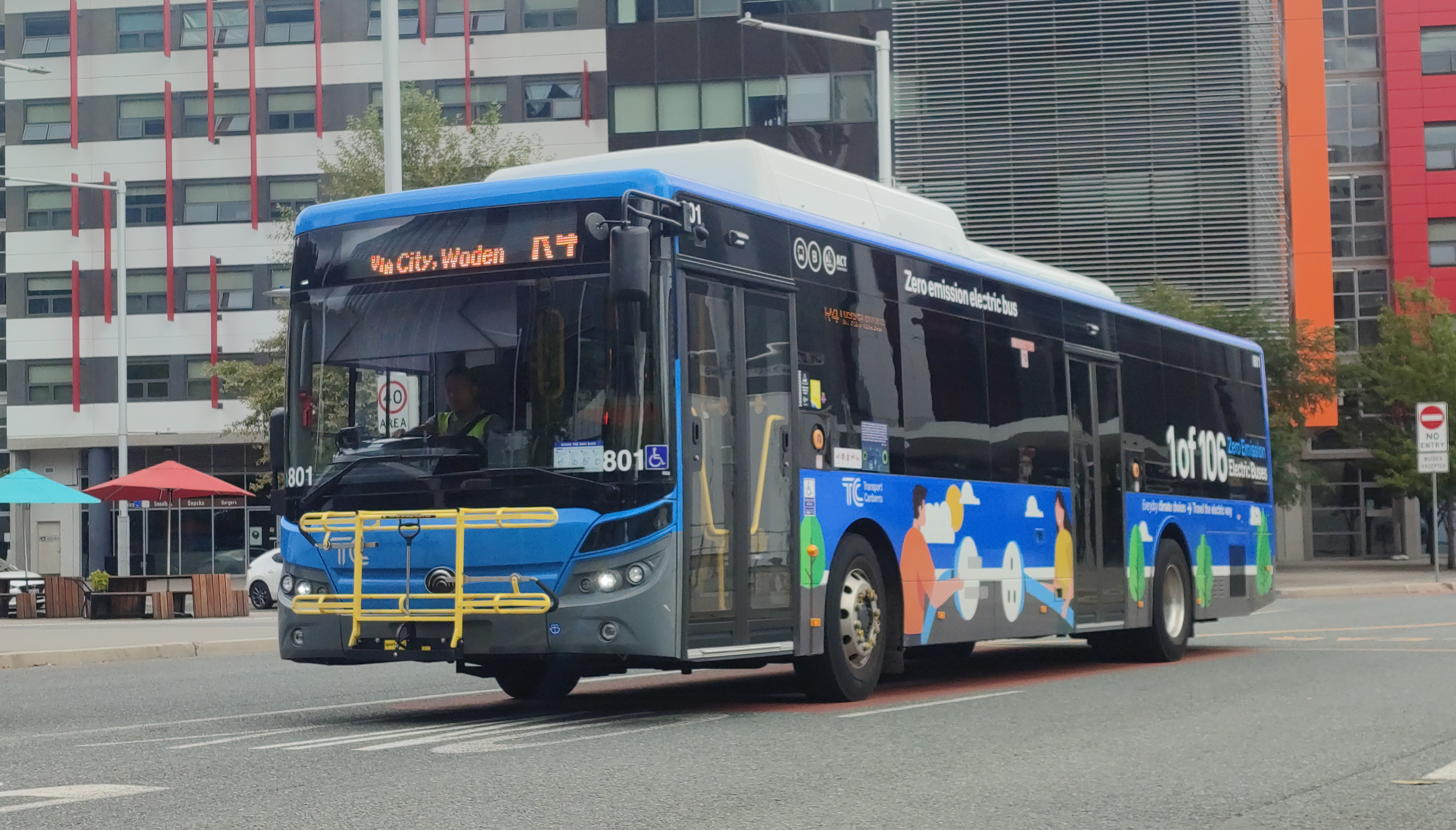
Yutong E12 electric bus in 2024

On 19 July 1926, the Federal Capital Commission commenced operating public bus services between Kingston in the south and Ainslie in the north.

The service was first known as Canberra City Omnibus Service, but it has had a number of names over the years, including Canberra City Bus Service, Canberra Omnibus Service and Canberra Bus Service. On 14 February 1977, it was renamed as the Australian Capital Territory Internal Omnibus Network, or ACTION for short.

In 1976, Canberra became the first city in Australia to operate articulated buses after the purchase of 25 MAN SG192s. In May 1982, ACTION commenced operating the Canberra Explorer in a joint venture with Murrays.

As part of the move to ACT self-government, responsibility for ACTION passed from the Federal Government to the Government of the Australian Capital Territory in 1989. In 2001, ACTION became a statutory authority.

=== Network 2019 ===
In June 2018, the Government of the Australian Capital Territory released a proposal for changes to the bus network to coincide with the opening of the Light Rail which included a 7-day network with 10 rapid routes and an overhaul of the route numbers. The proposed changes caused controversy due to changes to school services and the removal of all Xpresso services. Public consultation for the proposal lasted between June and August 2018 and a modified proposal was released in October 2018. The starting date of the new bus network was pushed back to 29 April 2019 due to delays on the construction of the Light Rail.

== Corporate structure ==
ACTION is a business unit of the Public Transport Division of Transport Canberra & City Services. Transport Canberra was formed on 1 July 2016 by combining the Public Transport Division and Capital Metro Agency to manage all public transport operations within the ACT.

== Current routes ==
ACTION operates a 7-day network of bus routes including nine main routes and 48 local routes.

=== Rapid routes ===
Nine routes, designated as Rapid routes (R2–R10), provide relatively direct and frequent services. Routes R2, R3 and R4 together provide a frequent service between City and Belconnen and routes R4 and R5 together provide a frequent service between City and Woden.

==== R2 ====
Route R2 links Fraser, Kippax, Belconnen, City, Parkes, Barton and Iron Knob Street, Fyshwick (at the Canberra Outlet Centre). The section from Fraser to Belconnen Interchange is temporarily being operated as Route 12 and frequency on R2 has been reduced from 12 to 15 minutes on weekdays due to work on Commonwealth Avenue Bridge.

It operates at 15-minute frequencies on weekdays and 30-minute frequencies on weekends and public holidays.

==== R3 ====
Route R3 links Spence, Belconnen, City, Russell Offices and Canberra Airport. The section from Spence to Belconnen Interchange is temporarily being operated as Route 13 due to work on Commonwealth Avenue Bridge.

It operates at a 15-minute frequency on weekdays and it operates at a 30-minute frequency on weekends and public holidays.

==== R4 ====
Route R4 services provide a link between Belconnen, City, Woden and Tuggeranong. Frequency has been reduced from 12 to 15 minutes on weekdays due to work on Commonwealth Avenue Bridge.

It operates 15-minute frequencies on weekdays, weekends and public holidays.

==== R5 ====
Route R5 is link between the City, Woden, Erindale Centre, Calwell Centre and Lanyon Marketplace. Frequency has been reduced from 12 to 15 minutes on weekdays and it has been extended to Belconnen due to work on Commonwealth Avenue Bridge.

It operates at 15-minute frequencies on weekdays and 30-minute frequencies on weekends and public holidays.

==== R6 ====
Route R6 is a link between the City, Parkes, Barton, Kingston, Manuka, Narrabundah, the Canberra Hospital and Woden. Frequency has been reduced from 12 to 15 minutes on weekdays and it has been extended to Belconnen due to work on Commonwealth Avenue Bridge.

It operates at 15-minute frequencies on weekdays and 30-minute frequencies on weekends and public holidays.

==== R7 ====
Route R7 provides a direct link between the City, Cooleman Court and Chapman.

It operates 15-minute frequencies on weekdays and 30-minute frequencies on weekends and public holidays.

==== R8 ====
Route R8 is a direct route between the Gungahlin Town Centre and the bus stations at Belconnen.

It operates at 15-minute frequencies on weekdays and 30-minute frequencies on weekends and public holidays.

==== R9 ====
Route R9 is an east-west link between Belconnen, Canberra Stadium, Dickson and Watson.

It operates at a 15-minute frequencies on weekdays and 30-minute frequencies on weekends and public holidays.

==== R10 ====
Route R10 is a direct link between Denman Prospect and the City.

It operates 15-minute frequencies on weekdays and 30-minute frequencies on weekends and public holidays.

=== Regular route services ===
ACTION's regular weekday services operate either as feeder services to a single town centre or connect two or three town centres via suburban streets.

During weekends and public holidays, ACTION provides a reduced level of service with most suburban routes operating with an hourly or two-hourly frequency.

=== Other peak services ===
ACTION operates three weekday peak hour routes as an express service between outer suburbs of Tuggeranong and City Interchange. These routes are numbered in the 100 series.

ACTION trialled a shuttle bus loop service from Canberra Airport to the Fairbairn Business Park on a three month trial basis. The service operated from 7am until 10am in the morning and again from 4pm until 7pm in the afternoon on weekdays.

=== School services ===
School services are provided by ACTION to schools and colleges throughout the ACT. These are numbered in the 1000 and 2000 series.

=== Special needs transport ===
ACTION also operates the special needs transport division which provides transport for school students with a disability. This division is operated using a dedicated fleet of wheelchair-accessible minibuses.

=== Flexible bus service ===
The Flexible bus service operates on weekdays to provide a free, basic bus service to passengers with limited access to normal public transport options. Six services operate daily providing a pick up service in the morning from designated suburbs to shopping centres and hospitals, with return services operating in the afternoon.

These bus services are operated by the special needs transport minibuses.

== Ticketing ==
=== Cash fares ===
There are four cash fare options on ACTION:

- Adult Single (with 90-minute transfer)
- Adult Daily
- Concession Single (with 90-minute transfer)
- Concession Daily

Concession tickets are available to school students, full-time tertiary students, seniors card holders and various government concession card holders.

=== Pre-paid fares ===
The pre-paid ticketing system operated is known as MyWay. It uses contactless smart cards with MIFARE-Technology onto which credit is loaded. Passengers are required to 'tag on' when boarding the bus and 'tag off' when exiting, at which point the appropriate fare is calculated and, if required, deducted from the stored value on the MyWay card.

The MyWay system uses Parkeon software and equipment including Wayfarer 200 consoles and Axio card readers. The system was built and installed by Parkeon's Australian distributor, Downer EDi. Instead of being developed from scratch, MyWay was adapted from Transperth's SmartRider system which also uses Parkeon hardware and software.

== Fleet ==
As at June 2026, ACTION's route service fleet consisted of 454 buses.

Chassis	Body	Type	Air con	Bike rack fitted	Easy Access	Notes	Number in service	Image
Renault PR100.2	Ansair	Step entrance rigid, Diesel		✓		Branded as Macks	4 (used for driver training)	
MAN A69 18.320 HOCL-NL/E5	Custom Coaches CB60 Evo II	Low-floor rigid, Euro V Diesel	✓	✓	✓		87	
MAN A69 18.310 HOCL-R-NL	Custom Coaches CB60 Evo II	Low-floor rigid, Euro IV Diesel	✓	✓	✓		2	
Scania K320UB 6x2*4	Custom Coaches CB60 Evo II	Low-floor rigid tri-axle (steerable-tag), Euro V Diesel	✓		✓		26	
Scania K360UA 6x2/2	Custom CB80	Low-floor articulated, Euro V/EEV Diesel	✓	✓	✓	Fitted with bike racks in June 2017	33	
Scania K320UB 4x2	Custom CB80	Low-floor rigid, Euro VI Diesel	✓	✓	✓		82	
Scania K360UA 6x2/2	Volgren Optimus	Low-floor articulated, Euro VI/EEV Diesel	✓	✓	✓		11	
Scania K320UB 4x2	Bustech VST	Low-floor rigid, Euro VI Diesel	✓	✓	✓		81	
Scania K320UB 4x2	Volgren Optimus	Low-floor rigid, Euro VI Diesel	✓	✓	✓		20	
Hino Poncho		Low-floor midibus, Euro V Diesel	✓		✓	Only operates on route 903	2	
Yutong ZK6131HG1	Yutong E12	Low-floor rigid, Battery electric	✓	✓	✓		102	
Custom Denning Element	Custom	Low-floor rigid, Battery electric	✓	✓	✓		4	

Bicycle racks have been fitted to the front of 94% of the buses in the fleet. Each rack can hold two bicycles. Passengers may load a bicycle onto the rack for free, but must pay a regular fare to travel on the bus.

Apart from buses with all over advertising or special designs, ACTION's fleet sport either a blue, orange and white (Renault buses) or a green, orange and white livery (all other buses). In December 2016, a predominantly blue livery was introduced.

ACTION's Special Needs Transport division operates a fleet of eighteen Mitsubishi Fuso Rosa minibuses. These buses are white in colour and do not operate on route services.

ACTION also operate Toyota Hiace Commuter and Hyundai iMax vans which can be used to transport passengers, Hino Dutro trucks used by mechanics to attend broken down buses and a single Mack tow truck.

ACTION's heritage fleet consists of a 1949 AEC Regal III and a 1961 AEC Reliance.

=== History ===
Until the mid-1970s, purchases mainly comprised heavyweight British built AEC and Leyland chassis before a switch was made to European chassis. In 1972, the first Volvo B58s were purchased. These were followed by MAN SL200s from 1975, articulated MAN SG192s from 1976, Mercedes-Benz O305s from 1981, articulated O305Gs from 1982, Renault PR100.2s from 1986, articulated Renault PR180.2s from 1988 and Renault PR100.3s from 1994. The Renaults were badged as Macks although they carried the Renault diamond badge. Around 1976, the first of the new MAN buses were being tested in Germany.

Although primarily purchasing new buses, ACTION has on occasions purchased and hired second-hand buses. With industrial action in England causing a shortage of both chassis and parts at a time Canberra was undergoing phenomenal growth, in February 1974, 12 Leyland OPS2/1s were hired from the Public Transport Commission. In June 1974 the entire 10 bus fleet of Bedford, Ford and Thornycroft buses of recently ceased operator Bowden's Bus Service of Tamarama was purchased. A number of Bedfords and Fords were purchased from dealer's stock.

In 1997, 25 Wright Crusader bodied Dennis Darts were imported from Northern Ireland. In 2001, 17 former North & Western Bus Lines Hino RG197Ks were leased from Sydney Buses for a short period. In February 2004, 20 Custom Coaches bodied Irisbus Agoras built for, but not delivered to King Brothers entered service.

=== Livery ===
Fleet livery was originally fawn with a yellow stripe. This was replaced by the 1960s by a coffee body with arctic green window area and red stripe. In 1973, a yellow body with arctic green window surrounds and light blue stripe livery was introduced. This was replaced in 2004 a white, green and orange livery.

=== Registrations ===
Initially buses were registered in the C#### series. By the 1960s, buses were registered as ZIB### in the Commonwealth of Australia series. In May 1989, the fleet was reregistered onto ACT Government BUS### plates.

== Infrastructure ==
=== Depots ===
==== Current depots ====
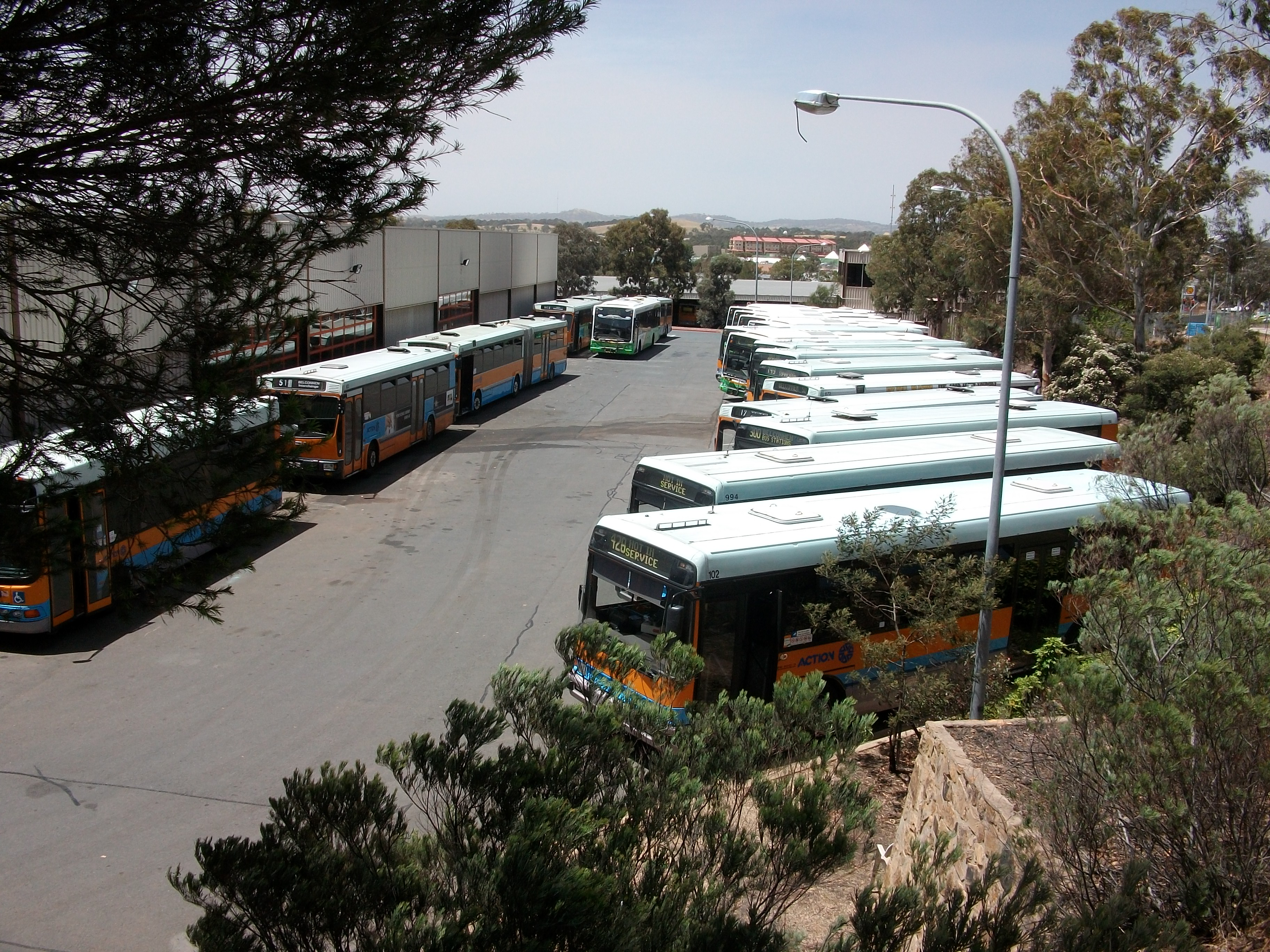
Belconnen Bus Depot in November 2009

ACTION operates three depots:

- Woden, Prospect Court, Phillip opened 16 April 1974, closing in February 1997 before reopening in 2009. From 2009 it housed the Special Needs Transport minibus fleet and buses which are not in service. It was demolished in 2018. A new electric bus depot opened on the site in April 2025.
- Belconnen, Cohen Street, Belconnen opened 3 September 1979, includes a bus wash, workshop, undercover bus parking, diesel refill, drivers amenities and administrative area.
- Tuggeranong, Scollay Street, Greenway opened in August 1989, includes a bus wash, workshop, undercover bus parking, CNG and diesel fuelling facilities, drivers amenities and administrative area.

==== Former depots ====
- Ainslie closed in February 1976, reopened in April 1976 to relieve overcrowiding at Kingston, closed September 1979 after Belconnned depot opened Demolished in April 1983 and redeveloped as townhouses
- Kingston, opened in 1926, closed March 1994, demolished in 2001

=== Bus stations ===
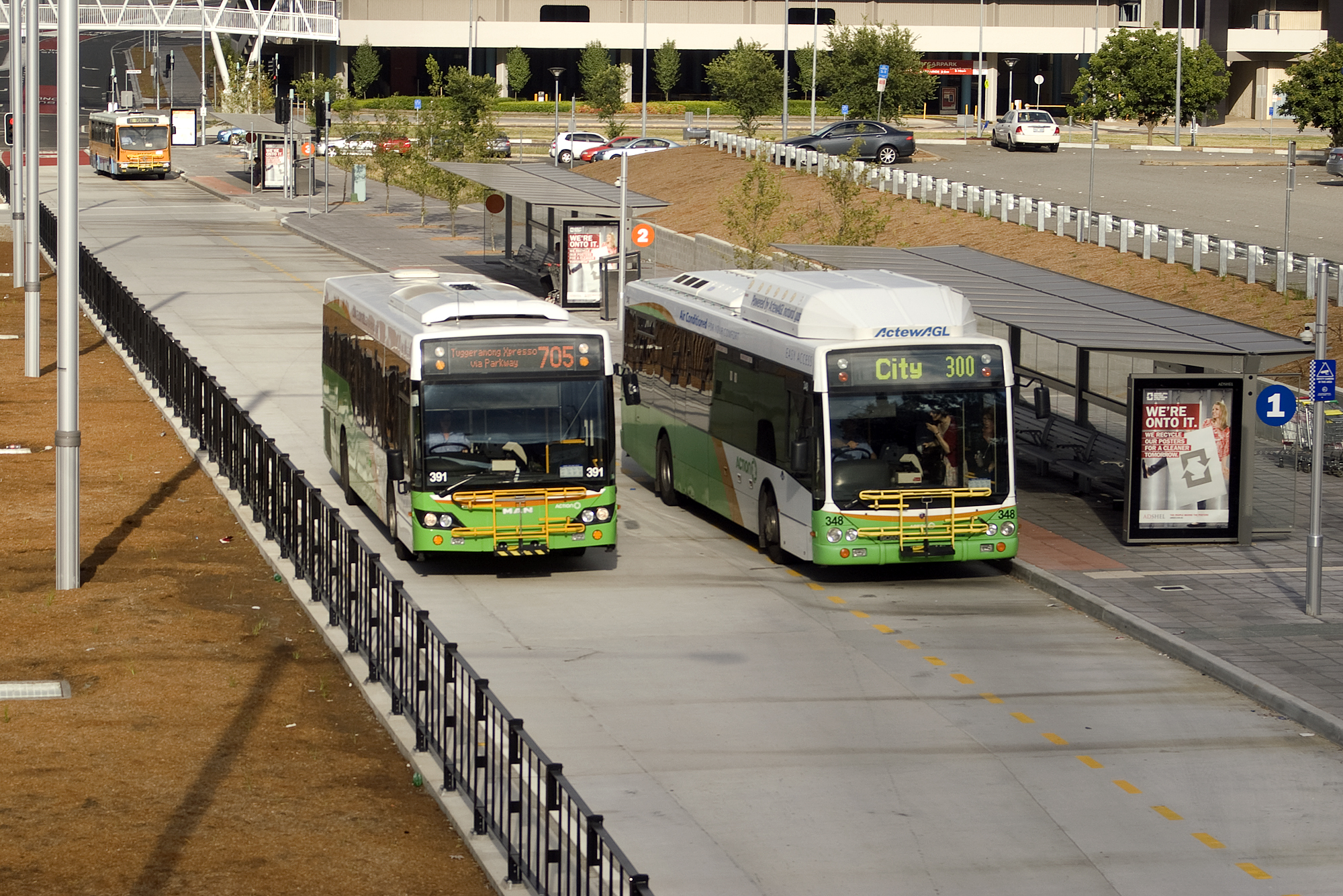
Belconnen Community Bus Station in January 2011

ACTION operates seven bus stations, which act as hubs for the districts of Canberra.

- City Interchange, opened 23 November 1982
- Woden Interchange, opened 4 December 1972, as the first dedicated off street facility in Australia, with a second stage opened in 1982, closed in January 2023 to make way for a Canberra Institute of Technology campus, replacement Woden Interchange opened to the north of the old facility in April 2026
- Tuggeranong Interchange, opened 12 August 1991
- Located in Belconnen Town Centre are three bus stations - Cohen Street (opened 2009) and Belconnen Community Station (opened November 2010) and Westfield Belconnen Station - which serve Belconnen, R2, R3, R4, R8 and R9 services
- Gungahlin Town Centre - located on Gungahlin Place - serves Gungahlin and R8 services. It provides interchange with light rail (R1)

City Interchange is located on East Row, Mort Street and Alinga Street. Limited local access is permitted on Mort and Alinga Streets, while East Row is a bus-only street. Since April 2019, several major routes stop in the part of Aligna Street to the west of Northbourne Avenue, but it continued to be open to traffic until 26 July 2019.

On 24 October 1994 the two platform City West terminal opened on Marcus Clarke Street with a layover for terminating city services. It closed in 2023 with a new layover facility opened on the northern side of Barry Drive.

Belconnen Town Centre is serviced by two bus stations located along Cohen Street: Cohen Street Bus Station (located outside the Belconnen Bus Depot near the intersection with Josephson Street, opened in May 2009) and Belconnen Community Bus Station (located between Benjamin Way and Emu Bank, at the site of the former Belconnen Interchange, opened in November 2010). In addition, a major stop is located outside Westfield Belconnen, near the intersection of Cohen and Lathlain Streets. All bus routes travelling to or through Belconnen Town Centre service all three locations. Additional stops are located on Emu Bank and Eastern Valley Way which are serviced by most routes which travel through Belconnen Town Centre.

=== Bus shelters ===
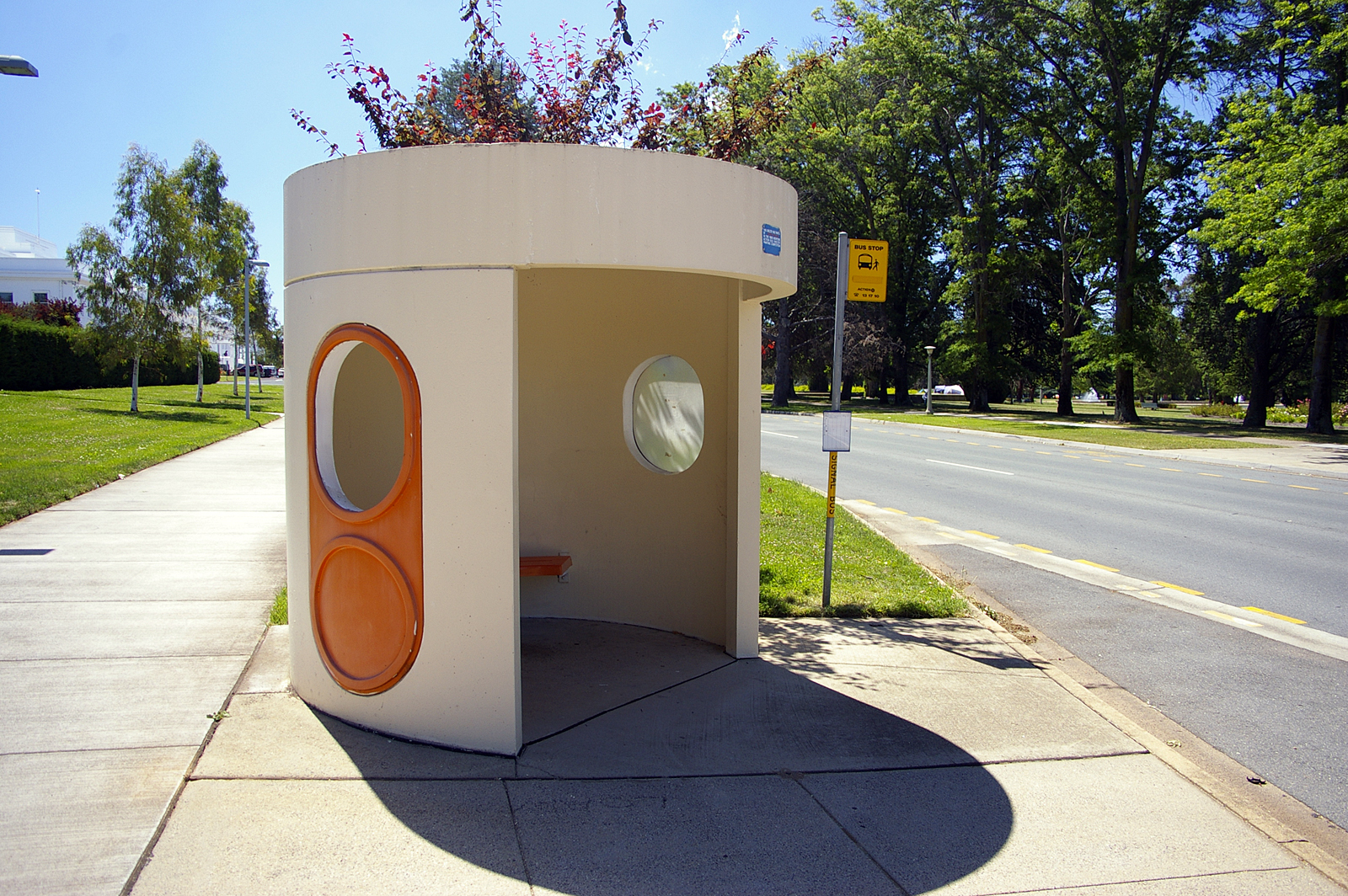
Concrete bunker shelter outside Old Parliament House, Parkes

Bus shelters installed at stops include what is referred to as a "concrete bunker" which were first installed in May 1975. More modern shelters include glass-sided Adshel shelters (both with and without advertising) which were first installed in 2007 and CAM (Community Asset Management NZ Limited) shelters which were first installed in 2012.
