= Mirvac =

Australian property company

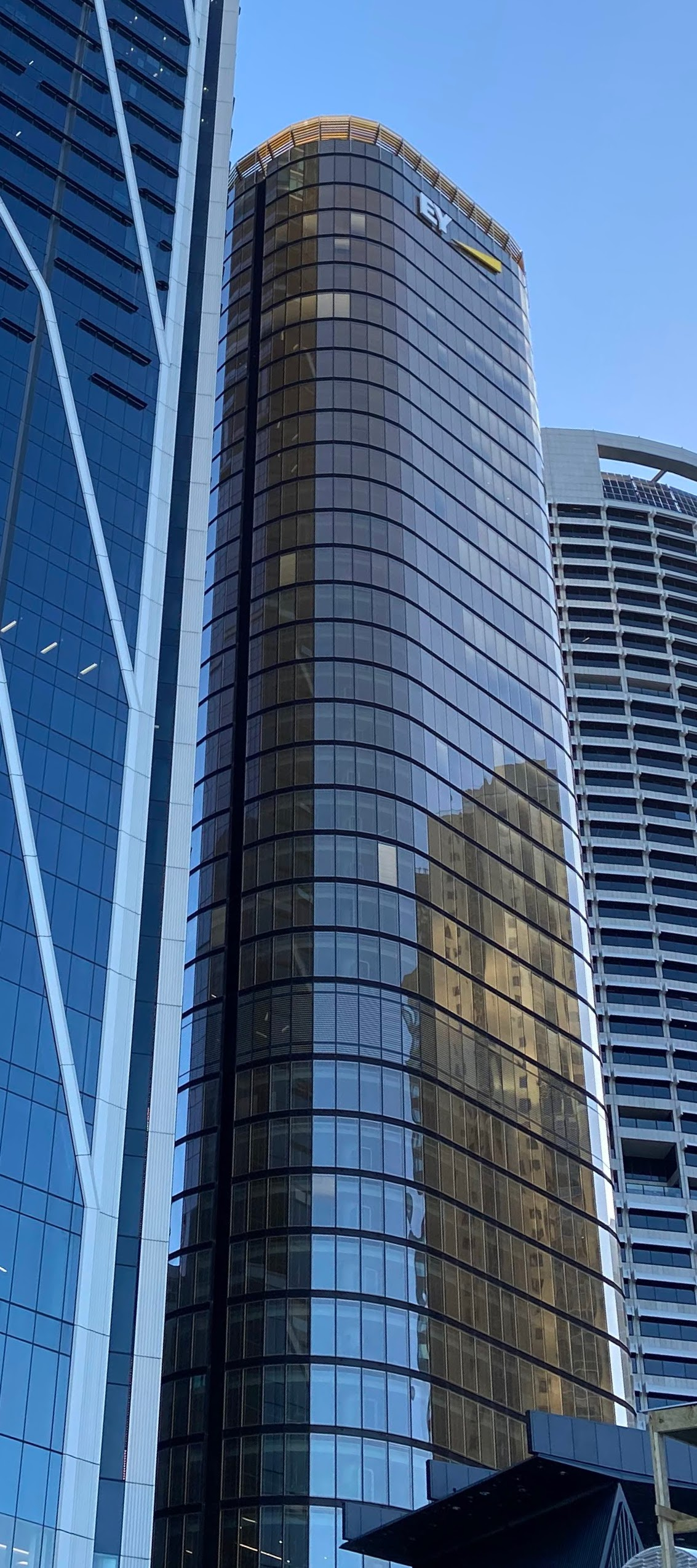
- Headquarters at 200 George Street
- Type: Public
- Traded as: ASX: MGR
- Industry: Property, Investment, Retail Property
- Founded: 1972; 54 years ago
- Founder: Bob Hamilton; Henry Pollack
- Headquarters: EY Centre (200 George Street); Sydney, Australia
- Key people: Rob Sindel (Chairman); Campbell Hanan (Managing Director)
- Website: www.mirvac.com

Mirvac is an Australian property group with operations across property investment, development, and retail services.

== History ==
Mirvac was founded in 1972 by Bob Hamilton and Henry Pollack. Its first project was a block of 12 apartments in Rose Bay. In October 2004 Mirvac purchased the James Fielding Group.

== Notable projects ==
- CSR Refinery, New Farm redevelopment
- Harold Park Paceway and Rozelle Tram Depot redevelopment
- Waverley Park redevelopment

== Office buildings ==
Notable office buildings owned by Mirvac include:

- Allendale Square
- David Malcolm Justice Centre (50%)
- Westpac Place (50%)

== Shopping centres ==
Notable shopping centres owned by Mirvac include:

- Birkenhead Point Outlet Centre
- Broadway Shopping Centre (50%)
- Cherrybrook Village Shopping Centre
- Cooleman Court
- Harbourside Shopping Centre
- Kawana Shoppingworld (50%)
- Rhodes Waterside (50%)
- Waverley Gardens Shopping Centre
