= List of rivers of New South Wales (L–Z) =

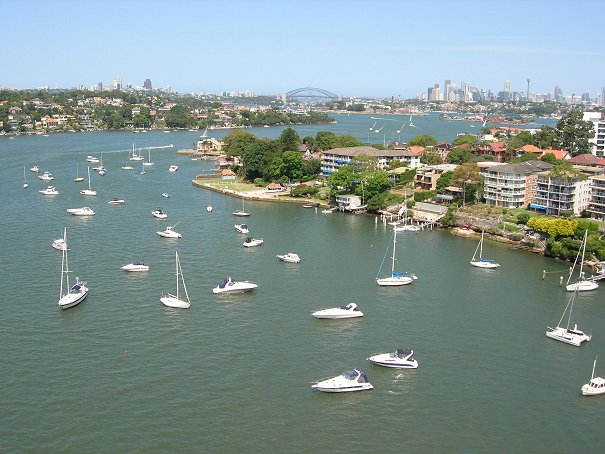
Parramatta River from Gladesville Bridge

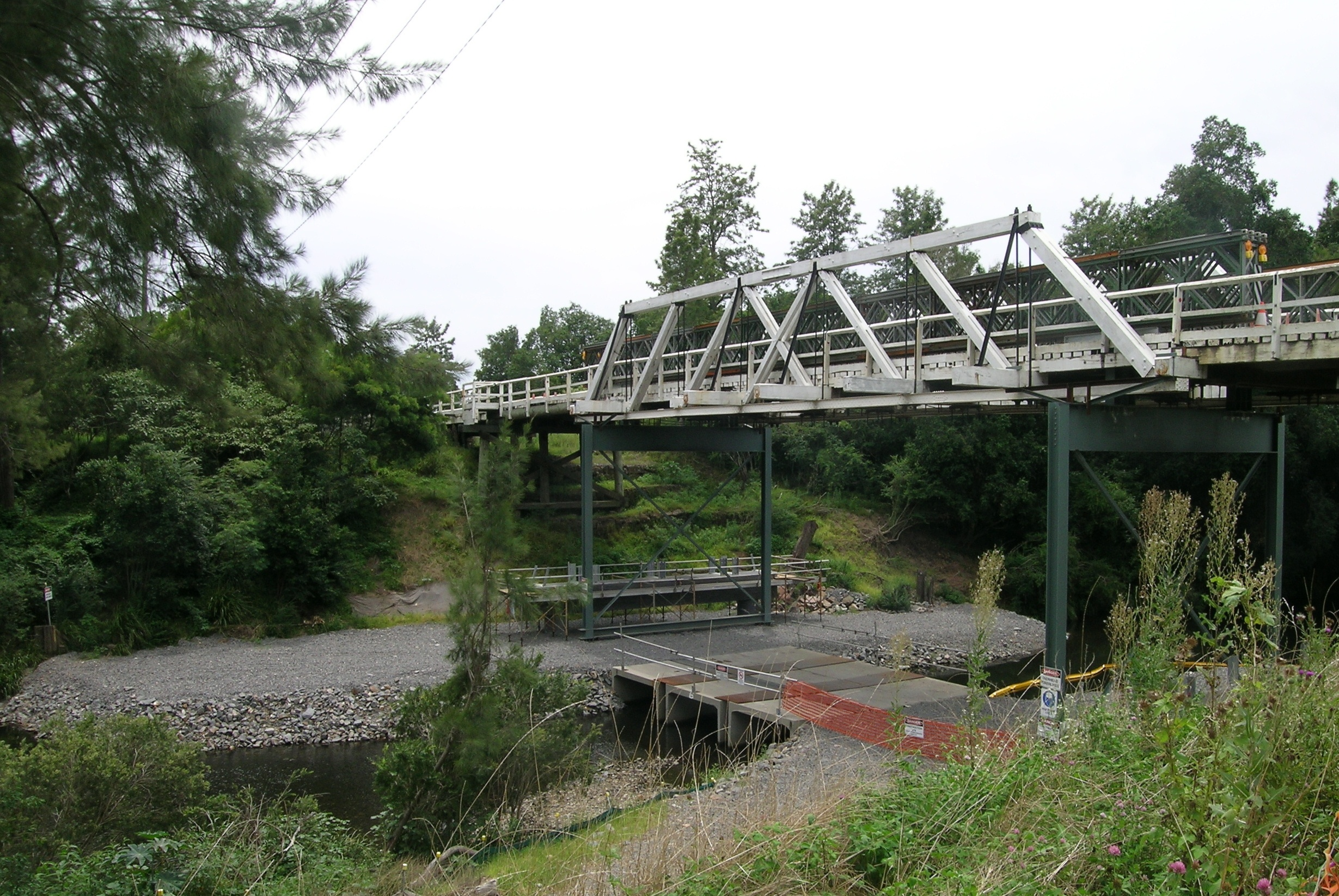
Williams River, Dungog, NSW

This is the second part of a list of rivers of New South Wales, Australia. With List of rivers of New South Wales (A–K) it includes all 439 rivers, as of 7 June 2008, listed by the Geographical Names Board of New South Wales in the Geographical Names Register (GNR) of NSW.

River name	Previous names	Source LGA	Source location
Lachlan	Western Branch; Branch of Lachlan River; Deadmans Creek and Boorungullen Chain; Mutbilly Creek	Boorowa	34°05′54″S 149°01′04″E
Lane Cove	Turrumburra	Hornsby	33°44′54″S 151°05′34″E
Lansdowne		Greater Taree	31°42′54″S 152°32′04″E
Lee Creek	Benjang Creek	Mid-Western Regional	32°28′54″S 150°08′04″E
Leycester Creek	Hanging Rock Creek; Terania Creek	Lismore	28°39′54″S 153°08′04″E
Little Murray		Bellingen	30°19′54″S 152°37′04″E
Little Nymboida		Coffs Harbour	30°10′54″S 152°52′04″E
Little Plains		Bombala	37°01′54″S 149°06′04″E
Little	Tomahawk Creek, The Little River.; Unga Creek	Wollondilly	34°10′54″S 150°28′04″E
Little	Mountain Station Creek; Paling Yards Creek; Dilga Creek	Dubbo	32°29′54″S 148°42′04″E
Little		Oberon	33°45′54″S 150°08′04″E
Little		Wingecarribee	34°31′54″S 150°37′04″E
Little Run Creek		Greater Taree	31°43′54″S 152°10′04″E
Little Weir		Walgett	29°00′54″S 148°51′04″E
Macdonald	Muluerindie – State Map Co. Inglis	Tamworth Regional	30°52′54″S 151°10′04″E
Macdonald	Mullen Malong Creek; Mullen Malone Creek; Branch Creek; Head Of Macdonald River *	Singleton	32°59′54″S 150°48′04″E
Macintyre	Karaula River	Inverell	28°49′54″S 150°40′04″E
Maclaughlin		Bombala	36°36′54″S 149°07′04″E
Macleay	(Includes Muddy River)	Armidale Dumaresq	30°44′54″S 152°15′04″E
Macquarie	Macquarie or Wammerawa River; Wammerawa River; Wambool	Bathurst Regional	32°59′54″S 149°15′04″E
Macquarie Rivulet		Wingecarribee	34°33′54″S 150°42′04″E
Mammy Johnsons	Mammy Johnsons Creek	Great Lakes	32°14′54″S 152°03′04″E
Mangrove Creek		Gosford	33°18′54″S 151°08′04″E
Mann	Mitchell River; Ben Lomond Creek; Mann River; Backwater R.	Clarence Valley	29°39′54″S 152°09′04″E
Manning		Gloucester	31°53′54″S 151°28′04″E
Maria	Maria River South Branch; Scrubby Creek	Kempsey	31°08′54″S 152°50′04″E
Maryland		Tenterfield	28°34′54″S 152°15′04″E
Medway Rivulet	Carrada Rivulet	Wingecarribee	34°32′54″S 150°19′04″E
Mehi	Gwydir or Meei River; Gwydir River; Meei River	Moree Plains	29°33′54″S 149°30′04″E
Meroo	Meroo Creek	Mid-Western Regional	32°44′44″S 149°29′04″E
Merrica		Bega Valley	37°19′54″S 149°54′04″E
Merriwa	Smiths Rivulet; Merriwa Creek; Middle Creek; Harrys Creek	Upper Hunter	32°05′54″S 150°22′04″E
Middle Creek	Deep Creek; Big Deep Creek	Narrabri	30°21′54″S 150°13′04″E
Minnamurra		Kiama	34°38′54″S 150°45′04″E
Mirrool Creek	Merool Creek	Bland	34°19′54″S 147°57′04″E
Mogo Creek	Wallambine Creek	Hawkesbury	33°09′54″S 151°02′04″E
Mole	The Mole River	Tenterfield	29°06′54″S 151°45′04″E
Molonglo		Queanbeyan	35°22′54″S 149°15′04″E
Mongarlowe	Little River	Palerang	35°24′54″S 149°56′04″E
Moonan Brook	Bells Creek	Upper Hunter	31°57′54″S 151°21′04″E
Mooney Mooney Creek		Gosford	33°20′54″S 151°15′04″E
Mooni	Moonie River	Walgett	29°09′54″S 148°38′04″E
Moppy	Morpey Creek	Gloucester	31°55′54″S 151°30′04″E
Moredun Creek	Clerks Creek; Kellys Creek; Branch Moredun Creek	Guyra	30°04′54″S 151°20′04″E
Moruya		Eurobodalla	35°54′54″S 150°07′04″E
Mowamba	Mowamba River; Moonbah River	Snowy River	36°30′54″S 148°27′04″E
Mulga Creek		Cobar	30°54′54″S 146°21′04″E
Mulla Mulla Creek	Mulla Creek	Tamworth Regional	31°17′54″S 151°18′04″E
Mulwaree	Mulwaree Ponds or Creek; Merigan Creek	Goulburn Mulwaree	34°59′54″S 149°39′04″E
Mummel		Greater Taree	31°27′54″S 151°54′04″E
Munmurra	Munmurra Brook	Upper Hunter	32°08′54″S 150°01′04″E
Murrah	Dry River	Bega Valley	36°31′54″S 150°01′04″E
Murray	Hume; Indi; Upper Indi; Millewa	Tumbarumba	36°47′48″S 143°11′46″E
Murruin Creek		Wollondilly	34°12′54″S 150°03′04″E
Murrumbidgee		Cooma-Monaro	35°39′47″S 149°08′00″E
Myall	Upper Myall River	Great Lakes	32°13′54″S 152°10′04″E
Nadgee		Bega Valley	37°25′54″S 149°52′04″E
Nadgigomar Creek	Curra Creek	Goulburn Mulwaree	35°06′54″S 149°52′04″E
Namoi		Narrabri	30°19′54″S 149°40′04″E
Nangahrah Creek		Tamworth Regional	30°21′54″S 150°48′04″E
Narran		Brewarrina	29°09′54″S 148°02′04″E
Nattai		Wollondilly	34°14′54″S 150°21′04″E
Nepean	Cowpasture River; Mittagong River; London River.	Penrith	33°43′52″S 150°39′32″E
Never Never	Never Never or North Creek	Bellingen	30°21′54″S 152°54′04″E
Niemur		Wakool	35°14′54″S 144°00′04″E
Nowendoc	Peel Creek	Greater Taree	31°37′54″S 151°48′04″E
Nowlands Creek		Guyra	30°07′54″S 151°58′04″E
Nullica	Myrrial River	Bega Valley	37°04′54″S 149°48′54″E
Numeralla	Umaralla River	Cooma-Monaro	36°32′54″S 149°24′04″E
Nunnock		Bega Valley	36°36′54″S 149°27′04″E
Nymboida	Coutts Water:; The Harness Cask	Clarence Valley	30°14′54″S 152°37′04″E
Oaky		Armidale Dumaresq	30°34′54″S 152°03′04″E
Oban	Ann River	Guyra	30°06′54″S 151°53′04″E
O'Briens Creek		Wagga Wagga	35°18′54″S 147°27′04″E
Orara	Wooworra River	Clarence Valley	29°59′54″S 152°59′04″E
Ourimbah Creek	Ourinbah Creek	Wyong	33°19′54″S 151°20′04″E
Oxley	Middle Arm Tweed River	Tweed	28°20′54″S 153°17′04″E
Paddys	Patricks River	Wingecarribee	34°38′54″S 150°10′04″E
Paddys	Cowra Creek; Paddys River	Tumbarumba	35°51′54″S 148°04′04″E
Pages Creek		Upper Hunter	31°44′54″S 151°16′04″E
Pages		Upper Hunter	31°59′54″S 151°00′04″E
Pambula	Panbula River	Bega Valley	36°55′54″S 149°50′04″E
Pappinbarra	Pappinbarra Creek; Left Arm of Pappinbarra Creek	Port Macquarie-Hastings	31°20′54″S 152°28′04″E
Parma Creek		Shoalhaven	35°00′54″S 150°31′04″E
Paroo	Paroo Channel; Paroo River Channels	Central Darling	30°27′54″S 143°58′04″E
Parramatta		Parramatta	33°49′54″S 151°06′04″E
Paterson	Yimmang River; Cedar Arms River	Dungog	32°19′54″S 151°30′04″E
Peak	Atkinsons Creek; Baloo Arm; Peak River	Tumut	35°28′54″S 148°26′04″E
Peel (A Section Of)	Cockburn River (A Section Of)	Tamworth Regional	31°06′54″S 150°57′04″E
Peel	Peel River (Eastern Branch)	Gunnedah	30°59′54″S 150°50′04″E
Peelwood Creek	Kangaloolah Creek; Kangaloolah Arm of Tuena Creek	Upper Lachlan	34°07′54″S 149°24′34″E
Phils		Upper Lachlan	34°14′24″S 149°30′04″E
Pigna Barney		Upper Hunter	31°45′54″S 151°30′04″E
Pinch	Moyangul or Pinch River	Snowy River	36°44′54″S 148°20′04″E
Pinchgut Creek		Junee	34°38′54″S 147°42′04″E
Pipers Creek		Kempsey	31°14′54″S 152°50′04″E
Pudman Creek	Pudmans Creek	Boorowa	34°29′54″S 148°54′04″E
Queanbeyan	Burra Creek; Sallee Creek (Nr)	Cooma-Monaro	35°39′54″S 149°22′04″E
Queen Charlottes Creek	Vale Creek; Queen Charlottes Ponds; Vale Ponds; Queen Charlottes Vale Creek	Bathurst Regional	33°28′54″S 149°34′04″E
Queens Pound		Bega Valley	36°18′54″S 149°38′04″E
Queensborough	Dormittys River	Bombala	37°07′54″S 149°02′04″E
Quegobla Creek	Waubebunga Creek	Walgett	30°22′54″S 148°48′04″E
Quirindi Creek	Dry Creek; Duri Creek.	Liverpool Plains	31°24′54″S 150°32′04″E
Ralfes Creek	Sheepstation Creek; Ralfes Rivulet	Port Macquarie-Hastings	31°25′54″S 152°17′04″E
Reedy Creek		Tamworth Regional	31°15′24″S 151°02′34″E
Retreat	Little River	Oberon	33°59′54″S 149°47′04″E
Richmond		Kyogle	28°29′54″S 152°58′04″E
River Lett		Lithgow	33°31′54″S 150°12′04″E
Rock Flat Creek	Flat Creek; Tolbar Creek	Cooma-Monaro	36°06′54″S 149°11′04″E
Rocky Ponds Creek	Spring Creek	Harden	34°28′54″S 148°39′04″E
Rocky	Gwydir River	Uralla	30°38′27″S 151°28′09″E
Rosewood	Little North Arm Bellinger River; Little North Arm Bellingen River	Bellingen	30°22′54″S 152°46′04″E
Rouchel Brook		Upper Hunter	32°07′54″S 150°59′04″E
Rous	North Arm Tweed River	Tweed	28°17′54″S 153°16′04″E
Rowleys	Number Two River	Walcha	31°32′54″S 152°04′04″E
Rufus		Wentworth	34°02′54″S 141°15′04″E
Rush Creek	The Rush Creek	Hawkesbury	33°19′54″S 150°46′04″E
Sandon		Clarence Valley	29°42′54″S 153°15′04″E
Sandy Creek		Bland	34°08′54″S 146°47′04″E
Sandy Creek	Crowl Creek	Cobar	32°12′54″S 144°30′04″E
Sandy Creek		Richmond Valley	28°59′54″S 153°06′04″E
Sandy Creek		Tamworth Regional	31°17′24″S 151°04′34″E
Sara	Mitchell River	Glen Innes Severn	29°59′54″S 152°05′04″E
Severn		Glen Innes Severn	29°34′54″S 151°53′04″E
Sewells Creek	Stony or Davys Creek	Oberon	33°44′54″S 149°38′04″E
Shannon Brook	Deep Creek; Branch of Deep Creek; Piora Creek *; Mummulgum Creek	Kyogle	28°55′54″S 153°00′04″E
Shoalhaven		Palerang	34°59′54″S 150°05′04″E
Snowy		Snowy River	36°30′54″S 148°27′04″E
Stewarts Brook	North Arm of Stewarts Brook	Upper Hunter	31°58′54″S 151°10′04″E
Stewarts		Greater Taree	31°42′54″S 152°36′04″E
Strike-a-Light	Tinderry Creek (Part); Strike-A-Light Creek *	Cooma-Monaro	35°49′54″S 149°19′04″E
Styx		Armidale Dumaresq	30°35′54″S 152°08′04″E
Summer Hill Creek	Fredericks Valley Creek	Cabonne	33°18′54″S 149°09′04″E
Swampy Plain	East Branch (Murray) River,; Murray River,; Geehi Creek; Cootapatamba Creek	Tumbarumba	36°21′54″S 148°10′04″E
Tabulam Rivulet	Kunbungy Creek:; Deep Creek	Kyogle	28°54′54″S 152°39′04″E
Talbragar		Upper Hunter	31°47′54″S 150°03′04″E
Tallawudjah Creek	Tallonagal Creek	Coffs Harbour	30°38′54″S 152°57′04″E
Tallowa Gully		Goulburn Mulwaree	34°44′54″S 150°13′04″E
Tarcutta Creek	Tarcatta Creek:; Oberne Creek	Wagga Wagga	35°24′54″S 147°50′04″E
Tarlo	Middle Arm Creek; Upper Tarlo Creek; Tarlo Creek; Cookbundoon River	Upper Lachlan	34°30′54″S 149°53′04″E
Tarrion Creek	Tarrian Creek	Brewarrina	30°01′54″S 146°45′04″E
Taylors Arm		Nambucca	30°44′54″S 152°39′04″E
Telegherry	Right Hand Branch Karuah River	Great Lakes	32°10′54″S 151°44′04″E
Terania Creek		Lismore	28°39′54″S 153°16′04″E
The Big Warrambool	The Big Warambool R; Booroona Creek; 35 Mile Warrambool	Walgett	29°37′54″S 148°00′04″E
The Branch	Sandy Creek; The Branch; Larpent River	Great Lakes	32°32′54″S 152°00′04″E
Thompsons Creek		Oberon	33°55′54″S 149°30′04″E
Thone		Port Macquarie-Hastings	31°33′54″S 152°29′04″E
Thredbo	Crackenback or Thredbo River; Crackemback River; Crackenback River	Snowy River	36°24′39″S 148°29′44″E
Tia	Crimps Creek	Walcha	31°10′54″S 151°49′04″E
Tilbuster Ponds	Commissioners Waters; Tilbuster Creek	Armidale Dumaresq	30°24′54″S 151°41′04″E
Timbarra	Rocky River	Tenterfield	29°19′54″S 152°15′04″E
Tindarey Creek		Central Darling	31°04′54″S 146°05′04″E
Tobins	Tobins Creek	Walcha	31°23′54″S 152°12′04″E
Tomaga		Eurobodalla	35°48′54″S 150°10′04″E
Tonalli		Wollondilly	34°05′54″S 150°15′04″E
Tooloom Creek		Tenterfield	28°34′54″S 152°29′04″E
Tooma		Tumbarumba	35°57′54″S 148°18′04″E
Towallum	Towallum or Back Creek	Clarence Valley	30°02′54″S 152°54′04″E
Towamba	Kiah River	Bega Valley	36°54′54″S 149°30′04″E
Trigalong Creek	Walladilly Creek	Temora	34°24′54″S 147°30′04″E
Tuglow		Oberon	33°58′54″S 149°55′04″E
Tumut	Doomut; Bewuck	Tumut	35°29′54″S 148°21′04″E
Turners Creek		Bogan	30°49′54″S 146°56′04″E
Turon		Lithgow	33°06′54″S 149°48′04″E
Tuross		Eurobodalla	36°14′54″S 149°45′04″E
Tweed	South Arm Tweed River; Jerrys Creek	Tweed	28°13′54″S 153°33′04″E
Undowah		Bombala	36°44′54″S 149°19′04″E
Upsalls Creek	Upsel Creek Or; Camden Haven River; (Northern Branch)	Port Macquarie-Hastings	31°36′54″S 152°29′04″E
Urumbilum		Coffs Harbour	30°16′54″S 152°57′04″E
Wadbilliga		Bega Valley	36°14′54″S 149°40′04″E
Wah Way Creek	Worwax Creek	Weddin	34°00′54″S 147°51′04″E
Walcrow		Greater Taree	31°27′54″S 151°50′04″E
Wallagaraugh		Bega Valley	37°11′54″S 149°30′04″E
Wallamba	Raikes River,; Browns Creek; Wollamba River	Greater Taree	32°05′54″S 152°15′04″E
Wallingat	Wallingat; Stony Creek (R)	Great Lakes	32°14′54″S 152°24′04″E
Wang Wauk	Maclean River	Greater Taree	32°09′54″S 152°14′04″E
Wangat	Little River	Dungog	32°09′54″S 151°40′04″E
Warbro Brook	Willi Willi Creek (Part)	Kempsey	30°54′54″S 152°30′04″E
Wards		Great Lakes	32°09′54″S 152°00′04″E
Warialda Creek	Gragin Creek; Reedy Creek R.; Gunnee Creek Nr:; Warialda Or Reedy Creek	Inverell	29°34′54″S 150°51′04″E
Warnes		Walcha	31°13′54″S 152°05′04″E
Warragamba		Wollondilly	33°52′54″S 150°36′04″E
Warrego		Bourke	29°59′54″S 145°23′04″E
Warrell Creek	Gurravembi Creek	Nambucca	30°44′54″S 152°55′04″E
Watagan Creek	Sugarloaf Creek,; South Arm of Wollombi Brook	Cessnock	33°00′54″S 151°10′04″E
Webbs Creek		Hawkesbury	33°19′54″S 150°55′04″E
Werong Creek		Singleton	32°54′54″S 151°00′04″E
Werriberri Creek	Monkey Creek	Wollondilly	33°56′54″S 150°33′04″E
Wheeny Creek		Hawkesbury	33°27′54″S 150°40′04″E
Wheeo Creek		Upper Lachlan	34°24′54″S 149°14′34″E
Whitbarrow Creek	Crowal; Whitbarrow Creek Nr.; Crowal Creek	Bogan	31°47′54″S 148°30′04″E
White Rock		Bombala	37°06′54″S 149°22′04″E
Widden Brook	Widdin Creek	Muswellbrook	32°26′54″S 150°23′04″E
Wild Cattle Creek		Bellingen	30°16′54″S 152°46′04″E
Williams	Dooribang River; N R. Double Falls Creek	Dungog	32°21′54″S 151°45′04″E
Williwa Creek	Willewa Creek; Williewa Creek	Lithgow	33°17′54″S 149°57′34″E
Wilson		Port Macquarie-Hastings	31°12′54″S 152°26′04″E
Wilsons	Wilsons Creek; North Arm Richmond River	Byron	28°31′04″S 153°21′21″E
Winburndale Rivulet	Windburndale Rivulet; Winborndale Rivulet	Bathurst Regional	33°22′54″S 149°41′04″E
Wingecarribee		Wingecarribee	34°29′54″S 150°23′04″E
Wog Wog		Bega Valley	37°02′54″S 149°30′04″E
Wolgan	Wolgan River (Western Branch)	Lithgow	33°23′03″S 150°09′24″E
Wollangambe	Wollangambe Creek	Lithgow	33°28′54″S 150°26′04″E
Wollemi Creek		Singleton	32°59′54″S 150°35′04″E
Wollombi Brook	Cockfighter Creek	Singleton	32°44′54″S 151°06′04″E
Wollomombi	Woolomombi Creek And; Rockvale Creek	Armidale Dumaresq	30°24′54″S 151°57′04″E
Wollondilly	Deerabublin River	Wollondilly	34°13′54″S 150°15′04″E
Wonboyn	Narrabarba Creek	Bega Valley	37°14′54″S 149°51′04″E
Wooli Wooli	Little River:; Wooli River	Clarence Valley	29°58′01″S 153°08′54″E
Worondi Rivulet	Chinamans Gully	Upper Hunter	32°16′54″S 150°28′04″E
Woronora		Wollongong	34°06′54″S 150°56′04″E
Wyong	Wyong Creek	Wyong	33°14′54″S 151°20′04″E
Yadboro	Yadboro Creek	Shoalhaven	35°18′54″S 150°07′04″E
Yancowinna Creek	Yancowinnia Creek	Unincorporated	31°46′32″S 141°33′20″E
Yanda Creek		Central Darling	31°49′54″S 146°20′04″E
Yango Creek		Cessnock	32°59′54″S 151°05′04″E
Yarrabandai Creek	Yarrabundie Creek,; Yarrabundry Creek,; Yarrabandi Creek,; Sandy Creek,	Forbes	33°05′54″S 147°34′04″E
Yarramanbah Creek	Yarrimanbah Creek	Liverpool Plains	31°40′54″S 150°25′04″E
Yarrangobilly	Heads of Yarrangobilly River	Tumut	35°38′54″S 148°30′04″E
Yarrow		Glen Innes Severn	29°51′54″S 151°55′04″E
Yarrowitch		Walcha	31°09′54″S 152°03′04″E
Yarrunga Creek		Wingecarribee	34°40′54″S 150°28′04″E
Yass	Cohen Creek (Part)	Palerang	35°00′54″S 149°15′04″E
Yowaka	Back Creek	Bega Valley	36°59′24″S 149°49′34″E
Yowrie	Yourie River	Bega Valley	36°19′54″S 149°42′04″E

== See also ==
- Rivers of New South Wales
- List of rivers of Australia
