= Sandy Creek (Richmond Valley) =

River in Australia

- Location of the Sandy Creek mouth in New South Wales

Location
- Country: Australia
- State: New South Wales
- Region: NSW North Coast (IBRA), Northern Rivers
- LGA: Richmond Valley

Physical characteristics
- Source
  - location: near Busbys Flat
- Mouth: confluence with the Richmond River
  - location: Bungawalbin
  - coordinates: 29°1′53″S 153°15′47″E
- Length: 55 km (34 mi)

Basin features
- River system: Richmond River catchment

The Sandy Creek, a perennial stream of the Richmond River catchment, is located in Northern Rivers region in the state of New South Wales, Australia.

== Location and features ==
Sandy Creek rises about 4 kilometres (2.5 mi) north of the village of Busbys Flat. The river flows generally east, north, east, and then south before reaching its confluence with the Richmond River near Bungawalbin, south of Coraki. The river flows for approximately 55 kilometres (34 mi) over its course.

== See also ==
- Rivers of New South Wales
- List of rivers of New South Wales (L-Z)
- List of rivers of Australia
