= Corindi River =

Coordinates: 30°02′S 153°08′E

Corindi River Redbank River, Corindi Creek

Location
- Country: Australia
- State: New South Wales
- IBRA: NSW North Coast
- District: Northern Rivers
- Local government area: Clarence Valley

Physical characteristics
- Source: Knobbys Lookout
  - location: west of Woolgoolga
  - elevation: 97 m (318 ft)
- Mouth: Coral Sea, South Pacific Ocean
  - location: near Red Rock
  - elevation: 0 m (0 ft)
- Length: 30 km (19 mi)
- Basin size: 146 km^{2} (56 sq mi)

Basin features
- Tributaries
  - left: Saltwater Creek (New South Wales)

Corindi River, an open mature wave dominated barrier estuary, is located in the Northern Rivers region of New South Wales, Australia.

== Course and features ==
Corindi River rises below Knobbys Lookout, in hilly country located to the west of Woolgoolga, and flows generally north northeast, north northwest, east northeast, and northeast, before reaching its mouth with the Coral Sea of the South Pacific Ocean north of Red Rock, descending 97 metres (318 ft) over its 30 kilometres (19 mi) course.

The river is transversed by the Pacific Highway near Corindi Beach.

== See also ==
- Rivers of New South Wales
- List of rivers of Australia
