= Lansdowne River =

Coordinates: 31°52′S 152°37′E

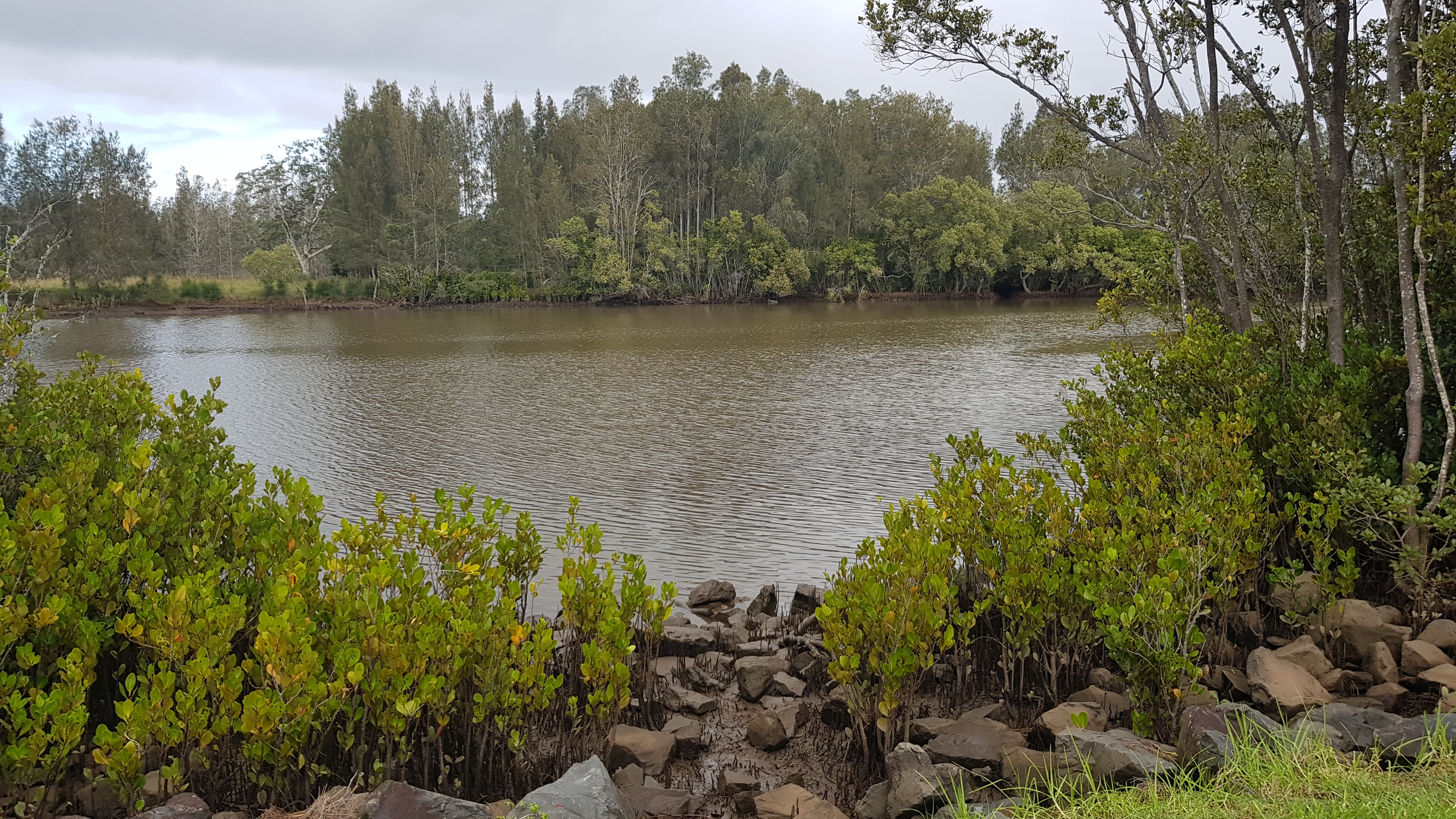
- Lansdowne River at Coopernook, 2023

Location
- Country: Australia
- State: New South Wales
- IBRA: NSW North Coast
- District: Mid North Coast
- Local government area: Greater Taree

Physical characteristics
- Source: Mount Gibraltar, Gibraltar Range
  - location: near Upper Lansdowne
  - elevation: 740 m (2,430 ft)
- Mouth: confluence with the Manning River
  - location: near Coopernook
  - elevation: 0 m (0 ft)
- Length: 51 km (32 mi)

Basin features
- River system: Manning River catchment
- National park: Coorabakh

Lansdowne River, a watercourse of the Manning River catchment, is located in the Mid North Coast district of New South Wales, Australia.

== Course and features ==
Lansdowne River rises below Mount Gibraltar in the Gibraltar Range, north northwest of Upper Lansdowne, and flows generally southeast before reaching its confluence with the Northern Arm of the Manning River, near Coopernook. The river descends 740 metres (2,430 ft) over its 51 kilometres (32 mi) course.

The Pacific Highway crosses the Lansdowne River south-east of Coopernook.

== See also ==
- Rivers of New South Wales
- List of rivers of New South Wales (L–Z)
- List of rivers of Australia
