= Little Burke River =

Little Burke River may refer to:

- Little Burke River (New South Wales), Australia, a tributary of Burke River (New South Wales)
- Little Burke River (Queensland), Australia.

== See also ==
- Burke River (disambiguation)
