= Burke River =

Burke River may refer to:

- Burke River (New South Wales), Australia, a tributary of Nepean River
- Burke River (Queensland), Australia
- Burke River (New Zealand)

also see:

- Little Burke River (disambiguation)
