= Wang Wauk River =

River in New South Wales, Australia

Coordinates: 32°11′S 152°23′E

Wang Wauk River Maclean River
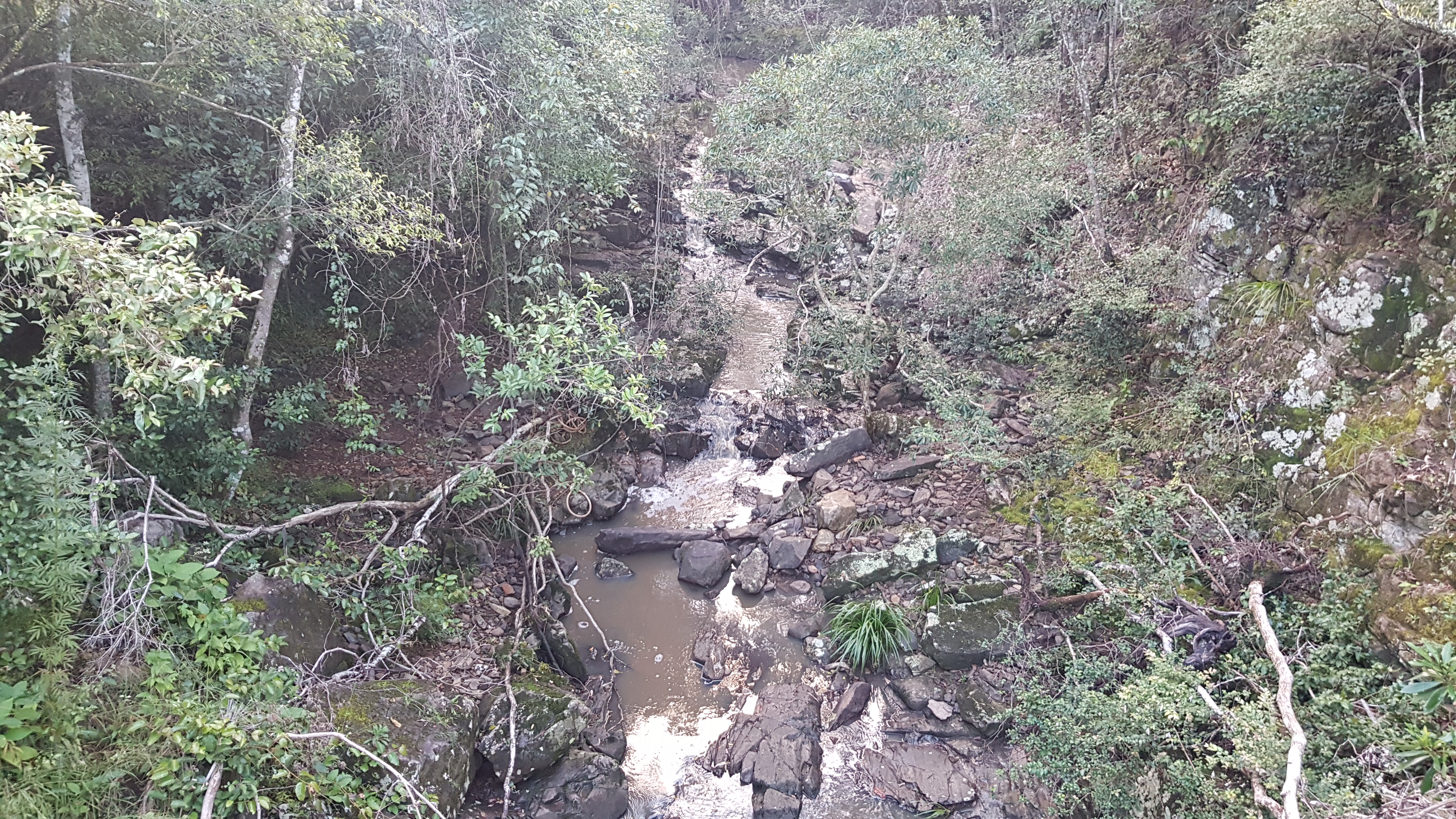
- Wang Wauk River, 2023

Location
- Country: Australia
- State: New South Wales
- Region: NSW North Coast (IBRA), Mid North Coast
- Local government area: Mid-Coast Council

Physical characteristics
- Source: Meyers Range
- 2nd source: Horse Creek and Teatree Creek
  - elevation: 228 m (748 ft)
- Mouth: confluence with Coolongolook River
  - location: southwest of Nabiac
  - elevation: 0 m (0 ft)
- Length: 38 km (24 mi)

Basin features
- River system: Great Lakes
- Tributaries
  - left: Bunyah Creek

Wang Wauk River, a perennial river of the Great Lakes system, is located in the Mid North Coast region of New South Wales, Australia.

== Course and features ==
Formed from the confluence of the Horse Creek and Teatree Creek, the Wang Wauk River rises on the slopes of the Meyers Range within Wang Wauk State Forest, and flows generally north and then east, joined by one minor tributary before reaching its confluence with the Coolongolook River, southwest of Nabiac. The river descends 231 metres (758 ft) over its 38 kilometres (24 mi) course.

== See also ==
- Rivers of New South Wales
- List of rivers of Australia
- List of rivers of New South Wales (L–Z)
