= Little River (Wingecarribee) =

Coordinates: 34°32′S 150°37′E

Little

Location
- Country: Australia
- State: New South Wales
- Region: Sydney Basin (IBRA), Southern Highlands
- Local government area: Wingecarribee

Physical characteristics
- Source
  - location: north of Hilltop, near Robertson
- Mouth: confluence with the Dudewaugh Creek
- Length: 8 km (5.0 mi)

Basin features
- River system: Hawkesbury-Nepean catchment

The Little River, a watercourse that is part of the Hawkesbury-Nepean catchment, is located in the Southern Highlands region of New South Wales, Australia.

== Course and features ==
The Little River rises south southeast of the locality of Wills Hill, near Robertson, and flows generally north before reaching its confluence with the Dudewaugh Creek, a tributary of the Burke River within the Upper Nepean River catchment. The course of the river is approximately 8 kilometres (5.0 mi).

== See also ==
- List of rivers of New South Wales (L–Z)
- List of rivers of Australia
- Rivers of New South Wales
