= Pigna Barney River =

River in New South Wales, Australia

Coordinates: 31°52′S 152°37′E

Location
- Country: Australia
- State: New South Wales
- IBRA: NSW North Coast
- District: Upper Hunter
- Local government area: Upper Hunter

Physical characteristics
- Source: Mount Royal Range
  - location: south of Glenrock
  - elevation: 1,210 m (3,970 ft)
- Mouth: confluence with the Manning River
  - location: south of Mount Myra
  - elevation: 389 m (1,276 ft)
- Length: 40 km (25 mi)

Basin features
- River system: Manning River catchment

Pigna Barney River, a partly perennial river of the Manning River catchment, is located in the Upper Hunter district of New South Wales, Australia.

== Course and features ==
Pigna Barney River rises on the eastern slopes of Mount Royal Range, south of the locale of Glenrock, and flows generally east by south before reaching its confluence with the Manning River, south of Mount Myra. The river descends 818 metres (2,684 ft) over its 40 kilometres (25 mi) course.

== See also ==
- Rivers of New South Wales
- List of rivers of New South Wales (L–Z)
- List of rivers of Australia
