= Nowlands Creek =

Coordinates: 30°02′S 152°08′E

Location
- Country: Australia
- State: New South Wales
- Region: NSW North Coast (IBRA), Northern Tablelands
- Local government area: Armidale

Physical characteristics
- Source: Thunderbolts Range
  - location: Diggers Hill
  - elevation: 1,290 m (4,230 ft)
- Mouth: confluence with the Sara River
  - location: Nightcap Range
  - elevation: 549 m (1,801 ft)
- Length: 37 km (23 mi)

Basin features
- River system: Clarence River catchment

The Nowlands Creek, a watercourse of the Clarence River catchment, is located in the Northern Tablelands region in the state of New South Wales, Australia.

== Location and features ==
Nowlands Creek rises in Thunderbolts Range, below The Black Mountain, about 1.5 kilometres (0.93 mi) east of Diggers Hill. The river flows generally northeast before reaching its confluence within the Sara River in remote country with the Nightcap Range. The river descends 739 metres (2,425 ft) over its 37 kilometres (23 mi) course.

== See also ==
- Rivers of New South Wales
- List of rivers of New South Wales (L-Z)
- List of rivers of Australia
