= Phils River =

River in Australia

Phils
- Location of the Phils River mouth in New South Wales

Location
- Country: Australia
- State: New South Wales
- Region: South Eastern Highlands (IBRA), Central West
- Municipality: Upper Lachlan

Physical characteristics
- Source: Great Dividing Range
  - location: near Thalaba
- Mouth: Bolong River
  - location: east of Blanket Flat
  - coordinates: 34°16′10″S 149°29′10″E
- Length: 30 km (19 mi)

Basin features
- River system: Lachlan sub-catchment, Murray–Darling basin

Phils River, a watercourse that is part of the Lachlan catchment within the Murray–Darling basin, is located in the central western region of New South Wales, Australia.

The river rises on the western slopes of the Great Dividing Range, near Thalaba, below Big Magpie Hill, and flows generally north–east, before reaching its confluence with the Bolong River, east of Blanket Flat.

== See also ==
- List of rivers of New South Wales (L–Z)
- List of rivers of Australia
- Rivers of New South Wales
