= Coopernook, New South Wales =

Coopernook New South Wales
- Coordinates: 31°49′25″S 152°36′50″E
- Population: 430 (2021 census)
- Postcode(s): 2426
- LGA(s): Mid-Coast Council
- State electorate(s): Port Macquarie
- Federal division(s): Lyne

Coopernook is a small town in mid-north New South Wales, Australia. It is located 24 kilometres north of Taree and 11 kilometres west of Harrington and is administered by Mid-Coast Council. At the 2021 census, Coopernook and the surrounding area had a population of 625 people, while the town itself had 430 inhabitants. It was formerly situated on the Pacific Highway, until 22 March 2006, when the Coopernook Bypass was opened. The old highway crossed the Lansdowne River on a narrow iron girder bridge.

== History ==
The name "Coopernook" means "the elbow" in the local Aboriginal language, Biripi. This name refers to the bend in the Lansdowne River which looks like an elbow of an arm.

Early settlers included Calvin, Rose, Eggins, Gillogilly, Longworth, Latham, Towers and Buchanan. A sandstone obelisk erected in 1997 commemorates the combatants in World War I, World War II and the Vietnam War.

== Population ==
Historical population
Year	Pop.	±%
1971	290	—
1976	262	−9.7%
1981	285	+8.8%
1986	333	+16.8%
1991	328	−1.5%
1996	352	+7.3%
2001	379	+7.7%
2006	365	−3.7%
2011	303	−17.0%
2016	365	+20.5%
2021	430	+17.8%
Source: Australian Bureau of Statistics data.

In the 2021 Census, there were 430 people in Coopernook. 86.0% of people were born in Australia and 92.3% of people spoke only English at home. The most common responses for religion were No Religion 36.7%, Anglican 23.3% and Catholic 12.1%.

== 2021 flood ==
Extreme rainfall on the east coast of Australia beginning on 18 March 2021 led to widespread flooding in New South Wales, affecting regions from the North Coast to the Sydney metropolitan area in the south.

On 20 March 2021, the Lansdowne River broke its bank and flooded across low-lying areas of Coopernook, cutting the township off completely. The Coopernook Hotel flooded to a level up over the bartop and had to close business for a number of weeks afterwards to refurbish the establishment. Houses around the hotel and all but one along Wharf Road were devastated by the water which entered houses during the night.

An evacuation centre was established in the United Church of Coopernook during the natural disaster to assist residents who had to leave their homes. The Australian government declared many parts of the east coast a natural disaster zone after the flooding rains forced 18,000 people to evacuate, in addition to over 1,000 flood rescues.

The floods occurred less than 18 months after Australia was affected by the Black Summer bushfires, impacting many towns still recovering from that disaster.

== See also ==
- Coorabakh National Park
