= Rosewood River =

Coordinates: 30°23′S 152°46′E

Rosewood River Little North Arm Bellinger River, Little North Arm Bellingen River

Location
- Country: Australia
- State: New South Wales
- Region: NSW North Coast (IBRA), Mid North Coast
- Local government area: Bellingen

Physical characteristics
- Source: Dorrigo Plateau, Great Dividing Range
  - location: east of Dorrigo
- Mouth: confluence with the Bellinger River
  - location: near Thora

Basin features
- River system: Bellinger River catchment
- National park: Dorrigo National Park

Rosewood River, a perennial river of the Bellinger River catchment, is located in the Mid North Coast region of New South Wales, Australia.

== Course and features ==
Rosewood River rises on the eastern slopes of the Dorrigo Plateau, part of the Great Dividing Range, within Dorrigo National Park east of Dorrigo, and flows in a meandering course south before reaching its confluence with the Bellinger River near Thora.

== See also ==
- Rivers of New South Wales
- List of rivers of New South Wales (L–Z)
- List of rivers of Australia
