= Pinchgut Creek =

Pinchgut
- Location of the Pinchgut Creek mouth in New South Wales

Location
- Country: Australia
- State: New South Wales
- Region: Riverina (IBRA), South West Slopes
- LGA: Junee

Physical characteristics
- Source: Dudauman Range, Great Dividing Range
  - location: south of Stockinbingal
  - coordinates: 34°34′11″S 147°47′43″E
  - elevation: 370 m (1,210 ft)
- Mouth: confluence with the Houlaghans Creek
  - location: north of Junee Reefs
  - coordinates: 34°40′50″S 147°36′00″E
  - elevation: 276 m (906 ft)
- Length: 31 km (19 mi)

Basin features
- River system: Murrumbidgee catchment, Murray–Darling basin

The Pinchgut Creek, a non–perennial stream that is part of the Murrumbidgee catchment within the Murray–Darling basin, is located in the South West Slopes region of New South Wales, Australia.

== Course and features ==
The Pinchgut Creek (technically a river) rises below Dudauman Range, part of the Great Dividing Range. The creek flows generally southwest before reaching its confluence with the Houlaghans Creek (itself a tributary of the Murrumbidgee River), near the locality of Junee Reefs. The creek descends 94 metres (308 ft) over its 31-kilometre (19 mi) course.

== See also ==
- List of rivers of New South Wales (L-Z)
- Rivers of New South Wales
