= Bilgola Creek =

Coordinates: 33°38′S 151°19′E

Bilgola Creek Bulgola Creek
- Etymology: Aboriginal: belgoula, meaning "swirling waters", or perhaps "a pretty beach with steep slopes, studded with cabbage palms".

Location
- Country: Australia
- State: New South Wales
- Region: Sydney basin (IBRA), Northern Beaches
- Local government areas: Northern Beaches Council

Physical characteristics
- Source: Bilgola Escarpment
  - location: Bilgola Plateau
- Mouth: confluence with the Tasman Sea
  - location: Bilgola Beach
  - elevation: 0 m (0 ft)
- Length: 0.5 km (0.31 mi)

Bilgola Creek is an urban gully or open channel that is located in the northern beaches region of Sydney, New South Wales, Australia.

== Course and features ==
Bilgola Creek rises about 1 kilometre (0.62 mi) west of Bilgola Head and flows generally east by south, from the Bilgola Escarpment through Littoral rainforest, coastal woodland and coastal clay heath communities directly out onto Bilgola Beach and into the Tasman Sea. A smaller ephemeral creek line also flows down from the escarpment at the northern end of Bilgola Beach.

== See also ==
- Rivers of New South Wales
