= Pages Creek =

Coordinates: 31°45′S 151°16′E

Location
- Country: Australia
- State: New South Wales
- Region: Sydney Basin (IBRA), Upper Hunter
- Local government area: Upper Hunter Shire

Physical characteristics
- Source: Great Dividing Range
  - location: Ben Halls Gap
  - elevation: 1,360 m (4,460 ft)
- Mouth: confluence with the Hunter River
  - location: at Ellerston
  - elevation: 513 m (1,683 ft)
- Length: 38 km (24 mi)

Basin features
- River system: Hunter River catchment

Pages Creek, a mostly perennial stream of the Hunter River catchment, is located in the Hunter region of New South Wales, Australia.

== Course ==
Officially designated as a river, the Pages Creek rises on the southern slopes of the Great Dividing Range near Ben Halls Gap. The river flows generally southeast before reaching its confluence with the Hunter River at Ellerston. Pages Creek descends 842 metres (2,762 ft) over its 38 kilometres (24 mi) course.

== See also ==
- List of rivers of Australia
- List of rivers of New South Wales (L-Z)
- Rivers of New South Wales
