= Wonboyn Lake =

Lake in the state of New South Wales, Australia

- Location within New South Wales
- Location: New South Wales
- Coordinates: 37°14′40″S 149°55′40″E
- Basin countries: Australia

Wonboyn Lake is a tidal lake situated at the south-east tip of New South Wales in Australia. The nearest commercial centre is the town of Eden.

Wonboyn River is classed as a barrier river with an intermittently closed entrance. Water quality is monitored by NSW Department of Planning, Industry and Environment.

In 2021, Council discussed management of the lake in emergency. The local newspaper (The Magnet) reported: "Councillors heard that Wonboyn Lake which is home to oyster leases, had never closed between 1930 and 2004 but then it closed in 2004, 2009 and 2019. The lake was mechancially [sic] opened twice in 2020 to address bushfire impacts."

Sapphire Coast Tourism Industry Resources states "Wonboyn has a reputation second to none for some of the finest lake, estuary, beach and land based game fishing on the coast." Oyster farming is a core part of the local economy.
