= Nadgee River =

Coordinates: 37°26′S 149°52′E

Location
- Country: Australia
- State: New South Wales
- Region: South East Corner (IBRA), South Coast
- Local government area: Bega Valley

Physical characteristics
- Source: Mount Nadgee
  - elevation: 319 m (1,047 ft)
- Mouth: Tasman Sea, South Pacific Ocean
  - location: Black Head, Cape Howe
- Length: 21 km (13 mi)
- Basin size: 58.8 km^{2} (22.7 sq mi)
- Depth
  - average: 0.5 m (1 ft 8 in)

Basin features
- Tributaries
  - left: Daylight Creek
  - right: Wombat Creek

The Nadgee River is a mature intermittently closed saline coastal lagoon; or perennial river located in the South Coast region of New South Wales, Australia.

== Course and features ==
Nadgee River rises on the southern slopes of Mount Nadgee within the Nadgee Nature Reserve in remote country near the boundary between New South Wales and Victoria; located about 6 kilometres (3.7 mi) northwest by west of Mount Victoria. The river flows generally east, joined by two minor tributaries before reaching its mouth with the Tasman Sea of the South Pacific Ocean, west northwest of Black Head, north of Cape Howe. The river descends 319 metres (1,047 ft) over its 21 kilometres (13 mi) course.

The catchment area of the river is 58.8 square kilometres (22.7 sq mi) with a volume of 89.6 megalitres (3.16×10^{6} cu ft) over a surface area of 0.3 square kilometres (0.12 sq mi), at an average depth of 0.5 metres (1 ft 8 in).

== See also ==
- Rivers of New South Wales
- List of rivers of New South Wales (L–Z)
- List of rivers of Australia
