= Nullica River =

River in New South Wales, Australia

Coordinates: 37°05′00″S 149°48′50″E

Nullica River Myrrial River

Location
- Country: Australia
- State: New South Wales
- Region: South Eastern Highlands (IBRA), South Coast
- Municipality: Bega Valley

Physical characteristics
- Source: Nullica Hill, Nullica State Forest
  - location: west of Eden
  - elevation: 137 m (449 ft)
- Mouth: Tasman Sea, South Pacific Ocean
  - location: Nullica Bay, Twofold Bay
- Length: 11 km (6.8 mi)
- Basin size: 55 km^{2} (21 sq mi)
- Depth
  - average: 0.6 m (2 ft 0 in)

Basin features
- Tributaries
  - right: Leos Creek

The Nullica River is a perennial river, which transitions into an intermittently closed semi-mature saline coastal lagoon at its mouth, located in the South Coast region of New South Wales, Australia.

== Course and features ==
The Nullica River rises below Nullica Hill within Nullica State Forest, approximately 11 kilometres (6.8 mi) west of Eden, The river flows generally east southeast, joined by one minor tributary, before reaching its mouth at the northern end of Beermuna (Boydtown Beach), east of Nullica. The mouth of the river is intermittently closed by a sandbar, but when the mouth is open the river empties into Nullica Bay, the southern bight of Twofold Bay in the Tasman Sea. The river descends 137 metres (449 ft) over its 11 kilometres (6.8 mi) course.

The catchment area of the river is 55 square kilometres (21 sq mi) with a volume of 176 megalitres (6.2×10^{6} cu ft) over a surface area of 0.3 square kilometres (0.12 sq mi), at an average depth of 0.6 metres (2 ft 0 in).

West of the river's mouth, the Princes Highway crosses the Nullica River.

== See also ==
- List of rivers of Australia
- List of rivers of New South Wales (L–Z)
- Rivers of New South Wales
