= Jacobs River (New South Wales) =

Coordinates: 36°45′S 148°27′E

Jacobs River Tongaroo River

Location
- Country: Australia
- State: New South Wales
- Region: Australian Alps (IBRA), Snowy Mountains
- Local government area: Snowy Monaro Regional Council

Physical characteristics
- Source: Snowy Mountains, Great Dividing Range
  - location: near Mount Stony
  - elevation: 1,230 m (4,040 ft)
- Mouth: confluence with the Snowy River
  - location: below Stockyard Ridge
  - elevation: 266 m (873 ft)
- Length: 26 km (16 mi)

Basin features
- River system: Snowy River catchment
- Tributaries
  - left: Teatree Creek, Tuross Creek, Thatchers Hole Creek, Ingebirah Creek
  - right: Connors Camp Creek
- National park: Kosciuszko NP

The Jacobs River, a perennial river of the Snowy River catchment, is located in the Snowy Mountains region of New South Wales, Australia.

== Course and features ==
The Jacobs River rises below Purgatory Hill within the Snowy Mountains Range, part of the Great Dividing Range, contained within the Kosciuszko National Park, on the western slopes of Mount Stony. The river flows generally west and then southeast, joined by five minor tributaries, before reaching its confluence with the Snowy River below Stockyard Ridge. The river descends 966 metres (3,169 ft) over its 26 kilometres (16 mi) course.

== See also ==
- List of rivers of New South Wales (A–K)
- List of rivers of Australia
- Rivers of New South Wales
