= Rouchel Brook =

Coordinates: 32°08′S 150°59′E

Location
- Country: Australia
- State: New South Wales
- Region: Sydney Basin (IBRA), Upper Hunter
- Local government area: Upper Hunter

Physical characteristics
- Source: Mount Royal Range
  - location: below Big Losy Mountain
  - elevation: 840 m (2,760 ft)
- Mouth: confluence with the Hunter River
  - location: south of Glenbawn Dam
  - elevation: 188 m (617 ft)
- Length: 46 km (29 mi)

Basin features
- River system: Hunter River catchment
- Tributaries
  - left: Davis Creek (New South Wales)
  - right: Back Creek (Upper Hunter, New South Wales)

Rouchel Brook, a perennial stream of the Hunter River catchment, is located in the Hunter region of New South Wales, Australia.

== Course ==
Officially designated as a river, the Rouchel Brook rises below Big Losy Mountain on the western slopes of the Mount Royal Range. The river flows generally south of west, joined by two minor tributaries, before reaching its confluence with the Hunter River south of Glenbawn Dam, east of Aberdeen. Rouchel Brook descends 652 metres (2,139 ft) over its 46 kilometres (29 mi) course.

== See also ==
- List of rivers of Australia
- List of rivers of New South Wales (L-Z)
- Rivers of New South Wales
