= Little Murray River (New South Wales) =

Anabranch of the Murray River, New South Wales, Australia

Coordinates: 35°31′S 144°00′E

Location
- Country: Australia
- State: New South Wales, Victoria
- Region: Riverina (IBRA)
- Municipalities: Wakool, Balranald

Physical characteristics
- Source: Murray River
  - location: near Barham
- Mouth: confluence with the Murray River
  - location: Gonn Crossing, Victoria
  - elevation: 75 m (246 ft)
- Length: 30.6 km (19.0 mi)

Basin features
- River system: Murray River, Murray–Darling basin
- Island: Campbells Island

Little Murray River (New South Wales), an anabranch of the Murray River and part of the Murray–Darling basin, is located in the western Riverina region of south western New South Wales, Australia.

The river rises northwest of Barham in New South Wales and flows generally northwest before reaching its confluence with the Murray River near Gonn Crossing in Victoria. Little Murray River and the Murray River enclose Campbells Island, that forms part of the Campbells Island State Forest.

== See also ==
- List of rivers of New South Wales
- List of rivers of Australia
