= Pambula Beach, New South Wales =

Pambula Beach
- Town
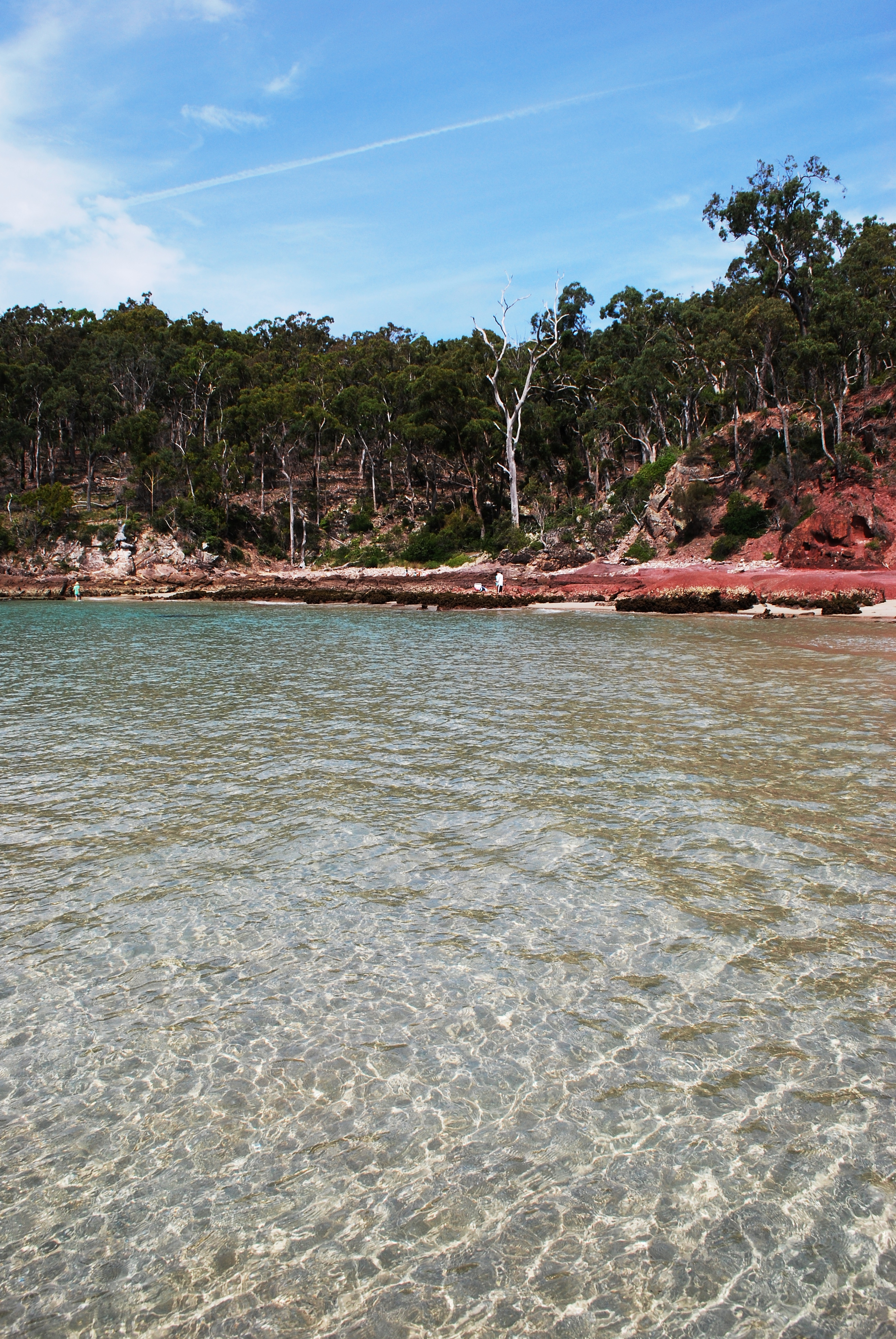
- Pambula Beach

- Coordinates: 36°56′S 149°54′E
- Country: Australia
- State: New South Wales
- LGA: Bega Valley Shire

Government
  - State electorate: Bega
  - Federal division: Eden-Monaro

Population
  - Total: 654 (2016 census)
- Postcode: 2549

Pambula Beach is a town in New South Wales, Australia not far from Pambula. At the 2016 census, Pambula Beach had a population of 654 people.

There are three surfing beaches. 1. The Main Beach, Pambula Beach, is located in front of the Pambula Beach Holiday Hub and the surf club next door. It is the most popular of all the beaches in the town and the beach curves around the bay until it becomes Main Beach in the nearby township of Merimbula. 2. south past the coastal rocks and cliffs, is Lions Beach. Behind the beach lies Lions Park, with a barbecue and picnic area. 3. The 250 metres (820 ft) long beach ends at the mouth of the Pambula River: or The River Mouth. This surfing spot, named for the former sand banks, has been a surfing spot in the region. Today, however, the River Mouth suffers from lack of swell and insufficient sand banks.
