= Wonboyn River =

Coordinates: 37°15′S 149°58′E

Wonboyn River Narrabarba Creek

Location
- Country: Australia
- State: New South Wales
- Region: South East Corner (IBRA), South Coast
- Local government area: Bega Valley

Physical characteristics
- Source: Narrabarba Creek and Watergums Creek
  - elevation: 44 m (144 ft)
- Mouth: Tasman Sea, South Pacific Ocean
  - location: Disaster Bay, near Green Cape
- Length: 18 km (11 mi)
- Basin size: 335 km^{2} (129 sq mi)
- Depth
  - average: 2.7 m (8 ft 10 in)

Basin features
- Tributaries
  - left: Stevens Creek

The Wonboyn River, an open youthful wave dominated barrier estuary or perennial stream, is located in the South Coast region of New South Wales, Australia.

== Course and features ==
Wonboyn River is formed by the confluence of Narrabarba Creek and Watergums Creek, within Beowa National Park, east of the Princes Highway and southeast of the locality of Kiah, approximately 3 kilometres (1.9 mi) north of Timbillica Hill. The river flows generally east, northeast, and then southeast, joined by one minor tributary, flowing through Wonboyn Lake, before reaching its mouth within Disaster Bay, at the Tasman Sea of the South Pacific Ocean southeast of Green Cape. The river descends 44 metres (144 ft) over its 18 kilometres (11 mi) course.

The catchment area of the river is 335 square kilometres (129 sq mi) with a volume of 9,809 megalitres (346.4×10^{6} cu ft) over a surface area of 4.2 square kilometres (1.6 sq mi), at an average depth of 2.7 metres (8 ft 10 in).

== See also ==
- Rivers of New South Wales
- List of rivers of New South Wales (L–Z)
- List of rivers of Australia
