= Pambula River =

Coordinates: 36°56′S 149°52′E

Pambula River Panbula River

Location
- Country: Australia
- State: New South Wales
- Region: South East Corner (IBRA), South Coast
- Local government area: Bega Valley

Physical characteristics
- Source: Timbered highlands
  - location: near Lochiel
  - elevation: 83 m (272 ft)
- Mouth: Tasman Sea, South Pacific Ocean
  - location: near Pambula Beach
- Length: 15 km (9.3 mi)
- Basin size: 296 km^{2} (114 sq mi)
- Depth
  - average: 2.2 m (7 ft 3 in)

Basin features
- Tributaries
  - left: Chalkhills Creek

Pambula River is an open semi-mature wave dominated barrier estuary or perennial river located in the South Coast region of New South Wales, Australia.

== Course and features ==
Pambula River rises in timbered highlands near the locality of Lochiel and flows generally east, flowing through Pambula Lake, before reaching its mouth into the Tasman Sea of the South Pacific Ocean near the locality of Pambula Beach. The river descends 83 metres (272 ft) over its 15 kilometres (9.3 mi) course.

The catchment area of the river is 296 square kilometres (114 sq mi) with a volume of 9,774 megalitres (345.2×10^{6} cu ft) over a surface area of 4.7 square kilometres (1.8 sq mi), at an average depth of 2.2 metres (7 ft 3 in).

South of Pambula, the Princes Highway crosses the river.

The river also passes north of the town South Pambula that is named after the river passing north of it.

== See also ==
- Rivers of New South Wales
- List of rivers of New South Wales (L–Z)
- List of rivers of Australia
