= Sandon River =

River in New South Wales, Australia

Coordinates: 29°43′S 153°15′E

Location
- Country: Australia
- State: New South Wales
- Region: NSW North Coast (IBRA), Northern Rivers
- Local government area: Clarence Valley

Physical characteristics
- Source: Summervale Range
  - location: near Blue Gum Flat
  - elevation: 37 m (121 ft)
- Mouth: Coral Sea, South Pacific Ocean
  - location: below Sandon Bluffs
  - elevation: 0 m (0 ft)
- Length: 16 km (9.9 mi)
- Basin size: 131 km^{2} (51 sq mi)

Basin features
- Tributaries
  - left: Candole Creek

Sandon River, an open mature wave dominated, barrier estuary, is located in the Northern Rivers region of New South Wales, Australia.

== Course and features ==
Sandon River rises of the eastern slopes of the Summervale Range, west of Blue Gum Flat and flows generally northeast before reaching its mouth at the Coral Sea of the South Pacific Ocean below Sandon Bluffs, descending 37 metres (121 ft) over its 16 kilometres (9.9 mi) course.

== See also ==
- Rivers of New South Wales
- List of rivers of Australia
