= Thone River =

Coordinates: 31°33′55″S 152°29′5″E

Location
- Country: Australia
- State: New South Wales
- IBRA: NSW North Coast
- District: Mid North Coast
- local government area: Port Macquarie-Hastings

Physical characteristics
- Source: Mount Gibraltar, Gibraltar Range
- Mouth: confluence with the Hastings River
- Length: 32 km (20 mi)

Basin features
- River system: Hastings River catchment

Thone River, a perennial stream of the Hastings River catchment, is located in the Mid North Coast region of New South Wales, Australia.

== Course and features ==
Thone River rises on the eastern slopes of Mount Gibraltar, within the Gibraltar Range, and flows generally north northeast for 32 kilometres (20 mi) before reaching its confluence with the Hastings River.

== See also ==
- Rivers of New South Wales
- List of rivers of New South Wales (A–K)
- List of rivers of Australia
