= Merrica River =

Coordinates: 37°20′S 149°54′E

Location
- Country: Australia
- State: New South Wales
- Region: South East Corner (IBRA), South Coast
- Local government area: Bega Valley

Physical characteristics
- Source: Mount Nadgee
  - elevation: 230 m (750 ft)
- Mouth: Tasman Sea, South Pacific Ocean
  - location: Disaster Bay
- Length: 19 km (12 mi)
- Basin size: 60.5 km^{2} (23.4 sq mi)
- Depth
  - average: 0.4 m (1 ft 4 in)

Basin features
- Tributaries
  - left: Daylight Creek
  - right: Wombat Creek

The Merrica River is an intermediate intermittently closed saline coastal lagoon or perennial river located in the South Coast region of New South Wales, Australia.

== Course and features ==
Merrica River rises on the northern slopes of Mount Nadgee within the Nadgee Nature Reserve; located about 9 kilometres (5.6 mi) southwest of Tumbledown Mountain. The river flows generally northeast before reaching its mouth with the Tasman Sea of the South Pacific Ocean, emptying into Disaster Bay. The river descends 230 metres (750 ft) over its 19 kilometres (12 mi) course.

The catchment area of the river is 60.5 square kilometres (23.4 sq mi) with a volume of 48.5 megalitres (1.71×10^{6} cu ft) over a surface area of 0.1 square kilometres (0.039 sq mi), at an average depth of 0.4 metres (1 ft 4 in).

== See also ==
- Rivers of New South Wales
- List of rivers of New South Wales (L–Z)
- List of rivers of Australia
