= Maclaughlin River =

Coordinates: 36°49′S 148°59′E

Location
- Country: Australia
- State: New South Wales
- Region: South Eastern Highlands (IBRA), Monaro
- Local government area: Snowy Monaro Regional Council

Physical characteristics
- Source: Great Dividing Range
  - location: near Nimmitabel
  - elevation: 1,070 m (3,510 ft)
- Mouth: confluence with the Snowy River
  - location: near Mount Rix
  - elevation: 533 m (1,749 ft)
- Length: 84 km (52 mi)

Basin features
- River system: Snowy River catchment
- Tributaries
  - left: Bungee Peak Creek, Garlands Creek
- Nature reserve: Merriangaah Nature Reserve

The Maclaughlin River, a perennial river of the Snowy River catchment, is located in the Monaro region of New South Wales, Australia.

== Course and features ==
The Maclaughlin River rises on the southern slopes of the Great Dividing Range approximately 10 kilometres (6.2 mi) south southeast of Nimmitabel. The river flows generally west and then southwest, joined by two minor tributaries, before reaching its confluence with the Snowy River approximately 5 kilometres (3.1 mi) south by west of Mount Rix. The river descends 532 metres (1,745 ft) over its 84 kilometres (52 mi) course, flowing through Merriangaah Nature Reserve.

In its upper reaches, the Maclaughlin River is crossed by the Monaro Highway near Nimmitabel.

== See also ==
- Rivers of New South Wales
- List of rivers of New South Wales (L–Z)
- List of rivers of Australia
