= Mowamba River =

Coordinates: 36°27′S 148°39′E

Mowamba River Moonbah River

Location
- Country: Australia
- State: New South Wales
- Region: Australian Alps (IBRA), Snowy Mountains
- Local government area: Snowy Monaro Regional Council

Physical characteristics
- Source: Snowy Mountains, Great Dividing Range
  - location: near Mount Terrible
  - elevation: 1,360 m (4,460 ft)
- Mouth: confluence with the Snowy River
  - location: near Jindabyne
  - elevation: 853 m (2,799 ft)
- Length: 32 km (20 mi)

Basin features
- River system: Snowy River catchment
- Tributaries
  - left: Tulon Creek
  - right: Grosses Plain Creek
- National park: Kosciuszko NP

The Mowamba River, a perennial river of the Snowy River catchment, is located in the Snowy Mountains region of New South Wales, Australia.

== Course and features ==
The Mowamba River rises within The Snowy Mountains Range, part of the Great Dividing Range, contained within the Kosciuszko National Park, on the northeastern slopes of Mount Terrible. The river flows generally south, then northeast by east, joined by two minor tributaries, before reaching its confluence with the Snowy River approximately 2 kilometres (1.2 mi) south of Jindabyne, in the Jindabyne Gorge. The river descends 507 metres (1,663 ft) over its 32 kilometres (20 mi) course.

=== Water management ===
Water from the Mowamba River is diverted to Jindabyne Dam via the Mowamba weir and aqueduct; this is part of the Snowy Mountains Scheme.

On 28 August 2002, the Mowamba Weir was "turned out" allowing environmental water to overtop the weir. Environmental water releases occurred until January 2006. Since January 2006, environmental water releases to the Snowy River have occurred from Jindabyne Dam as the infrastructure upgrades to the dam wall had been completed.

== See also ==
- List of rivers of New South Wales (L–Z)
- List of rivers of Australia
- Rivers of New South Wales
