= Pinch River =

River in New South Wales, Australia

Coordinates: 36°48′S 148°25′E

Pinch River Moyangul River

Location
- Country: Australia
- State: New South Wales
- Region: Australian Alps (IBRA), Snowy Mountains
- Local government area: Snowy Monaro Regional Council

Physical characteristics
- Source: Snowy Mountains, Great Dividing Range
  - location: near Paradise Hill
  - elevation: 1,230 m (4,040 ft)
- Mouth: confluence with the Snowy River
  - location: below the Charcoal Range
  - elevation: 250 m (820 ft)
- Length: 24 km (15 mi)

Basin features
- River system: Snowy River catchment
- Tributaries
  - left: Lookout Creek
- National park: Kosciuszko NP

The Pinch River, a perennial river of the Snowy River catchment, is located in the Snowy Mountains region of New South Wales, Australia.

== Course and features ==
The Pinch River rises west of Paradise Hill in remote alpine country within the Snowy Mountains Range, part of the Great Dividing Range, contained within the Kosciuszko National Park. The river flows generally south-southeast, then west, then west-southwest, and then southeast, before reaching its confluence with the Snowy River below the Charcoal Range. The river descends 983 metres (3,225 ft) over its 24 kilometres (15 mi) course.

== See also ==
- List of rivers of New South Wales (L–Z)
- List of rivers of Australia
- Rivers of New South Wales
