= Tomaga River =

River in New South Wales, Australia

Coordinates: 35°50′S 150°11′E

Location
- Country: Australia
- State: New South Wales
- Region: South East Corner (IBRA), South Coast
- Local government area: Eurobodalla
- Town: Tomakin

Physical characteristics
- Source: Mogo Hill
  - location: Rosedale North
  - elevation: 91 m (299 ft)
- Mouth: Tasman Sea, South Pacific Ocean
  - location: Mossy Point
- Length: 16 km (9.9 mi)
- Basin size: 92 km^{2} (36 sq mi)
- Depth
  - average: 1 m (3 ft 3 in)

Basin features
- Tributaries
  - right: Jeremadra Creek

The Tomaga River, an open mature wave dominated barrier estuary or perennial stream, is located in the South Coast region of New South Wales, Australia.

== Course and features ==
Tomaga River rises about 2.5 kilometres (1.6 mi) northeast of Mogo Hill and flows generally southwest and then southeast, joined by one minor tributary, before reaching its mouth at the Tasman Sea of the South Pacific Ocean at Mossy Point. The river descends 92 metres (302 ft) over its 16 kilometres (9.9 mi) course.

The catchment area of the river is 91.9 square kilometres (35.5 sq mi) with a volume of 1,411 megalitres (49.8×10^{6} cu ft) over a surface area of 1.8 square kilometres (0.69 sq mi), at an average depth of 1 metre (3 ft 3 in).

== See also ==
- Rivers of New South Wales
- List of rivers of New South Wales (L–Z)
- List of rivers of Australia
