= Tonalli River =

Coordinates: 34°08′S 150°21′E

Tonalli

Location
- Country: Australia
- State: New South Wales
- Region: Sydney Basin (IBRA), Blue Mountains
- Local government area: Wollondilly

Physical characteristics
- Source: Tonalli Range
  - location: near Mount Armour
  - elevation: 676 m (2,218 ft)
- Mouth: confluence with the Wollondilly River to form Lake Burragorang
  - location: Yerranderie State Conservation Area
  - elevation: 118 m (387 ft)
- Length: 26 km (16 mi)

Basin features
- River system: Hawkesbury-Nepean catchment
- National parks: Nattai, Kanangra-Boyd

The Tonalli River, a perennial river that is part of the Hawkesbury-Nepean catchment, is located in the Blue Mountains region of New South Wales, Australia.

== Course and features ==
The Tonalli River rises on the eastern alopes of Mount Marrup within the Tonalli Range in remote country within the Greater Blue Mountains Area World Heritage Site, and flows generally east southeast, east northeast, and then east southeast, before reaching its confluence with the Wollondilly River within Lake Burragorang in Yerranderie State Conservation Area. The river descends 559 metres (1,834 ft) over its 26-kilometre (16 mi) course.

The river flows through parts of the Nattai and Kanangra-Boyd national parks and is a source of water for the Sydney region.

== See also ==
- List of rivers of New South Wales (L–Z)
- List of rivers of Australia
- Rivers of New South Wales
