= Rivers of New South Wales =

Overview of rivers in New South Wales

This page discusses the rivers and hydrography of the state of New South Wales, Australia.

The principal topographic feature of New South Wales is the series of low highlands and plateaus called the Great Dividing Range, which extend from north to south roughly parallel to the coast of the Coral and Tasman seas of the South Pacific Ocean.

The two main categories of rivers in New South Wales, are those that rise in the Great Dividing Range and flow eastwards to the sea, the Coastal NSW Rivers; and those that rise on the other side of the crest of the range and flow westward, the Inland NSW Rivers. Most of the inland rivers eventually combine into the Murray-Darling network of rivers, which drains to the sea in South Australia.

== Major rivers ==
The following rivers are the longest river systems, by length.

Longest rivers in New South Wales by length (September 2008)
Order	River name	Length		Region(s)	Notes
Order	River name	km	mi	Region(s)	Notes
1	Murray	2,508	1,558	Riverina	Approx. 1,808 kilometres (1,123 mi) of the river course is located within NSW. Also Australia's longest river.
2	Murrumbidgee	1,488	925	Riverina	Approx. 1,429 kilometres (888 mi) of the river course is located within NSW. Also Australia's second longest river.
3	Darling	1,472	915	Far West	Entire course of the river is located in NSW. Also Australia's third longest river.
4	Lachlan	1,440	895	Central West and Riverina	Entire course of the river is located in NSW. Also Australia's fourth longest river.
5	Macquarie	960	597	Central West	Entire course of the river is located in NSW.
6	Barwon	700	435	North West Slopes	Entire course of the river is located in NSW.

== Coastal rivers ==
Due to the relatively close proximity of the Great Dividing Range to the eastern coast of New South Wales, in general, the coastal rivers are short, navigable only in their lowest reaches, if at all, and subject to flooding in periods of high rainfall. The inland rivers have little water, are also subject to flooding, and their limited resources are extensively used for irrigation in the more arid inland agricultural districts of the State. On all of the significant inland rivers, large dams have been constructed to regulate the water flow, to facilitate irrigation, and in some cases, to generate hydro-power.

For administrative purposes, the rivers are generally grouped into four major catchments defined by their drainage basin, and then a series of sub-catchments. The following is a list of the coastal rivers in New South Wales, in order from north to south, grouped according to catchment and sub-catchments, from mouth to upper reaches, organised by tributary:

=== Northern Rivers catchment ===
==== Tweed River sub-catchment ====
- Coral Sea
  - Tweed River
    - Oxley River
    - Rous River

==== Brunswick River sub-catchment ====
- Coral Sea
  - Brunswick River

==== Richmond River sub-catchment ====
- Coral Sea
  - Evans River
  - Richmond River
    - Bungawalbin Creek
    - Wilsons River
      - Coopers Creek (designated as a river)
      - Leycester Creek (designated as a river)
        - Back Creek (designated as a river)
    - Eden Creek (designated as a river)
    - Sandy Creek (designated as a river)
    - Shannon Brook (designated as a river)

==== Clarence River sub-catchment ====
- Coral Sea
  - Clarence River
    - Mann River
      - Nymboida River
        - Boundary Creek (Nymboida) (designated as a river)
        - Blicks River
        - Glen Fernaigh River
          - Boundary Creek (Glen Fernaigh) (designated as a river)
        - Clouds Creek (designated as a river)
        - Boyd River
          - Sara River
            - Oban River
            - Nowlands Creek (designated as a river)
          - Guy Fawkes River
            - Aberfoyle River
          - Chandlers Creek (designated as a river)
        - Little Murray River
        - Bielsdown River
        - Little Nymboida River
          - Bobo River
      - Henry River
      - Yarrow River
    - Tooloom Creek (designated as a river)
      - Beaury Creek (designated as a river)
    - Cataract River
    - Coldstream River
    - Timbarra River
    - Orara River
      - Urumbilum River
      - Kangaroo River
        - Towallum River
    - Esk River
  - Corindi River
  - Maryland River
    - Boonoo Boonoo River
  - Sandon River
  - Wooli Wooli River
    - Barcoongere River

==== Bellinger River sub-catchment ====
- Tasman Sea
  - Bellinger River
    - Never Never River
    - Rosewood River
  - Kalang River

==== Nambucca-Macleay River sub-catchment ====
- Tasman Sea
  - Nambucca River
    - Taylors Arm (designated as a river)
  - Macleay River
    - Apsley River
      - Tia River
      - Yarrowitch River
        - Warnes River
    - Chandler River
      - Oaky River
      - Styx River
      - Wollomombi River
    - Dyke River
    - Gara River
      - Commissioners Waters (designated as a river)
    - Georges Creek (designated as a river)
    - Blue Mountain Creek (designated as a river)
    - Christmas Creek (designated as a river)
    - Kunderang Brook (designated as a river)

==== Hastings River sub-catchment ====
- Tasman Sea
  - Hastings River
    - Forbes River
    - Pappinbarra River
    - Tobins River
    - Thone River
    - Ellenborough River
      - Doyles River
    - Maria River
      - Wilson River
  - Camden Haven River

=== Hunter and Central Rivers catchment ===
==== Manning River sub-catchment ====
- Tasman Sea
  - Manning River
    - Pigna Barney River
    - Barnard River
      - Back River
      - Myall River
      - Curricabark River
    - Nowendoc River
      - Cooplacurripa River
        - Mummel River
        - Walcrow River
      - Rowleys River
        - Burns Creek (designated as a river)
        - Cells River
    - Connollys Creek (designated as a river)
    - Dingo Creek (designated as a river)
      - Bobin Creek (designated as a river)
      - Caparra Creek (designated as a river)
    - Cedar Party Creek (designated as a river)
    - Dawson River
    - Lansdowne River
    - Gloucester River
      - Barrington River
        - Cobark River
          - Dilgry River
        - Moppy River
        - Kerripit River
      - Bowman River
      - Avon River

==== Great Lakes sub-catchment ====
- Tasman Sea
  - Coolongolook River
    - Wallamba River
    - Wallingat River
    - Wang Wauk River
  - Karuah River
    - Mammy Johnsons River
      - Wards River
    - The Branch River
    - Telegherry River
  - Myall River
    - Crawford River

==== Hunter River sub-catchment ====
- Tasman Sea
  - Hunter River
    - Pages Creek (designated as a river)
    - Moonan Brook (designated as a river)
    - Stewarts Brook (designated as a river)
    - Paterson River
      - Allyn River
    - Williams River
      - Chichester River
        - Wangat River
    - Rouchel Brook (designated as a river)
    - Pages River
      - Isis River
    - Goulburn River
      - Munmurra River
        - Cooba Bulga Stream (designated as a river)
        - Cattle Creek (designated as a river)
      - Krui River
      - Bow River
      - Merriwa River
      - Worondi Rivulet
      - Bylong River
        - Growee River
        - Lee Creek (designated as a river)
      - Baerami Creek (designated as a river)
      - Widden Brook (designated as a river)
        - Blackwater Creek (designated as a river)
    - Wollombi Brook
      - Congewai Creek (designated as a river)
        - Cedar Creek (designated as a river)

=== Sydney basin catchment ===
==== Central Coast sub-catchment ====
- Tasman Sea
  - Lake Macquarie
    - Dora Creek (designated as a river)
  - Tuggerah Lake
    - Budgewoi Lake
      - Lake Munmorah
    - Wyong River
      - Cedar Brush Creek
  - Wamberal Lagoon
  - Terrigal Lagoon
  - Avoca Lake
  - Nunns Creek
  - Erina River

==== Hawkesbury-Nepean sub-catchment ====
- Tasman Sea
  - Hawkesbury River
    - Grose River
    - Nepean River
      - Glenbrook Creek
      - Erskine Creek
        - Bedford Creek
        - Glen Erskine Creek
      - Warragamba River
        - Coxs River
          - Kedumba River
          - Little River (Oberon)
          - Jenolan River
          - Kowmung River
            - Hollanders River
            - Tuglow River
          - Wollondilly River
            - Paddys River
            - Tonalli River
            - Nattai River
              - Little River (Wollondilly)
            - Tarlo River
            - Jooriland River
            - Mulwaree River
            - Wingecarribee River
              - Joadja Creek
              - Little River (Wingecarribee)
      - Burke River
        - Little Burke River
      - Cordeaux River
        - Avon River
      - Cataract River
      - Bargo River
    - Colo River
      - Wollemi Creek
      - Wollangambe River
      - Wolgan River
      - Capertee River
    - South Creek
      - Eastern Creek
        - Breakfast Creek
        - Bells Creek
        - Reedy Creek
      - Kemps Creek
        - Bonds Creek
      - Blaxland Creek
      - Ropes Creek
      - Badgerys Creek
    - Macdonald River
    - Mangrove Creek (designated as a river)
    - Mooney Mooney Creek (designated as a river)
    - Berowra Creek
    - Cowan Creek
      - Coal and Candle Creek
      - Smiths Creek
  - Pittwater

==== Sydney Metropolitan sub-catchment ====
- Tasman Sea
  - Bilgola Creek
  - Port Jackson
    - Middle Harbour
      - Middle Harbour Creek
    - Parramatta River
      - Iron Cove Creek
      - Hawthorne Canal
      - Lane Cove River
        - Gore Creek
        - Scout Creek
        - Devlins Creek
        - Terrys Creek
      - Tarban Creek
      - Powells Creek
        - Saleyards Creek
      - Haslams Creek
      - Duck River
        - A'Becketts Creek
          - Duck Creek
            - Little Duck Creek
      - Charity Creek
      - Smalls Creek
      - Archer Creek
      - Subiaco Creek
        - The Ponds Creek
      - Vineyard Creek
      - Darling Mills Creek
      - Toongabbie Creek
        - Blacktown Creek
    - Whites Creek
    - Johnstons Creek
      - Orphan School Creek
  - Botany Bay
    - Cooks River
      - Coxs Creek
      - Wolli Creek
        - Bardwell Creek
      - Cup and Saucer Creek
      - Alexandra Canal
    - Georges River
      - Cabramatta Creek
      - Prospect Creek
        - Burns Creek
        - Orphan School Creek (Fairfield)
          - Clear Paddock Creek
            - Edensor Creek
      - Salt Pan Creek
      - Woronora River
      - Boggywell Creek
  - Port Hacking
    - Hacking River

=== Southern Rivers catchment ===
==== Illawarra sub-catchment ====
- Tasman Sea
  - Lake Illawarra
  - Minnamurra River
  - Port Kembla

==== Shoalhaven River sub-catchment ====
- Tasman Sea
  - Shoalhaven River
    - Kangaroo River
    - Mongarlowe River
    - Corang River
    - Endrick River
  - St Georges Basin

==== Eurobodalla catchment ====
- Tasman Sea
  - Clyde River
    - Yadboro River
    - Bimberamala River
    - Buckenbowra River
  - Moruya River
    - Deua River
      - Araluen Creek (designated as a river)
        - Majors Creek (designated as a river)
      - Bettowynd Creek (designated as a river)
  - Tomaga River
  - Tuross River
    - Back River
    - Wadbilliga River
      - Queens Pound River
      - Yowrie River
    - Pambula River
      - Yowaka River

==== Far South Coast sub-catchment ====
- Tasman Sea
  - Bega River
    - Brogo River
    - Bemboka River
      - Nunnock River
  - Bermagui River
  - Genoa River
    - White Rock River
    - Wallagaraugh River
      - Imlay Creek (designated as a river)
  - Merimbula Lake
  - Merrica River
  - Murrah River
    - Dry River
  - Nadgee River
  - Twofold Bay
    - Nullica River
    - Towamba River
      - Wog Wog River
  - Pambula River
  - Wonboyn River

==== Snowy River sub-catchment ====
- Bass Strait
  - Snowy River (mouth located in Victoria)
    - Mowamba River
    - Maclaughlin River
    - Jacobs River
    - Delegate River
      - Bombala River
        - Undowah River
        - Coolumbooka River
      - Little Plains River
        - Bendoc River
        - Queensborough River
    - Pinch River
    - Eucumbene River
    - Gungarlin River
      - Burrungubugge River
    - Thredbo River
      - Little Thredbo River
    - Suggan Buggan River (river and mouth located in Victoria)
      - Ingeegoodbee River (mouth located in Victoria)

== Inland-flowing rivers ==
The inland-flowing rivers in New South Wales can be considered in two groups. In the northern half of the state, a series of rivers rise on the western side of the Great Dividing Range. These rivers flow west and northwest and eventually combine into the Barwon, which becomes the Darling River further west near Bourke. The waters of the Darling River then flow south through the arid far west of NSW.

The second group of inland-flowing rivers in NSW rise in the southern part of the state, sourced predominantly from the western and southern slopes of the Snowy Mountains and the western slopes of the Great Dividing Range, and combine directly with the Murray River, which forms the southern border of NSW with Victoria.

The two groups converge at Wentworth in the far south-west corner of the state, where the Murray River crosses the New South Wales/Victorian/South Australia border, east of Paringa in South Australia.

=== North-western New South Wales ===
- Darling River in the northwestern sector of the state.
  - Barwon River
    - Bokhara River
    - Moonie River
    - MacIntyre River
      - Boomi River
      - Dumaresq River
        - Bluff River
        - Severn River (Queensland)
        - Mole River
      - Severn River, New South Wales
        - Beardy Waters
    - Gwydir River also Copeton Dam
      - Horton River
      - Moredun Creek
      - Rocky River
      - Mehi River
    - Namoi River also Keepit Dam
      - Peel River
        - Cockburn River
      - Manilla River
      - Mooki River
      - Macdonald River
    - Castlereagh River
    - Macquarie River also Burrendong Dam
      - Talbragar River
        - Coolaburragundy River
      - Cudgegong River
      - Little River
      - Bell River
      - Turon River
        - Crudine River
      - Fish River
        - Duckmaloi River
        - Campbells River
    - Bogan River

=== South-western New South Wales ===
In the southwestern sector of the state:

- Murray River also Lake Hume
  - Murrumbidgee River also Burrinjuck Dam
    - Lachlan River also Wyangala Dam
      - Abercrombie River
        - Bolong River
        - Isabella River
      - Boorowa River
      - Belubula River
      - Crookwell River
    - Tumut River also Blowering Dam
      - Goobarragandra River
      - Doubtful Creek (designated as a river)
    - Goodradigbee River
    - Yass River
    - Molonglo River also Cotter River and other rivers of the ACT
      - Queanbeyan River
      - Jerrabomberra Creek (designated as a river)
    - Bredbo River
      - Strike-a-Light River
  - Edward River
    - Wakool River
  - Swampy Plain River
    - Geehi River see Snowy Mountains Scheme
  - Tooma River
    - Tumbarumba Creek (designated as a river)

== See also ==
- List of rivers of New South Wales (A-K) - Detailed listing of New South Wales rivers showing previous names and source locations for each river.
- List of rivers of New South Wales (L-Z) - Detailed listing of New South Wales rivers showing previous names and source locations for each river.
- List of rivers of Australia for an alphabetical listing including rivers in other Australian states
