= Snowy River =

River in south-eastern Australia

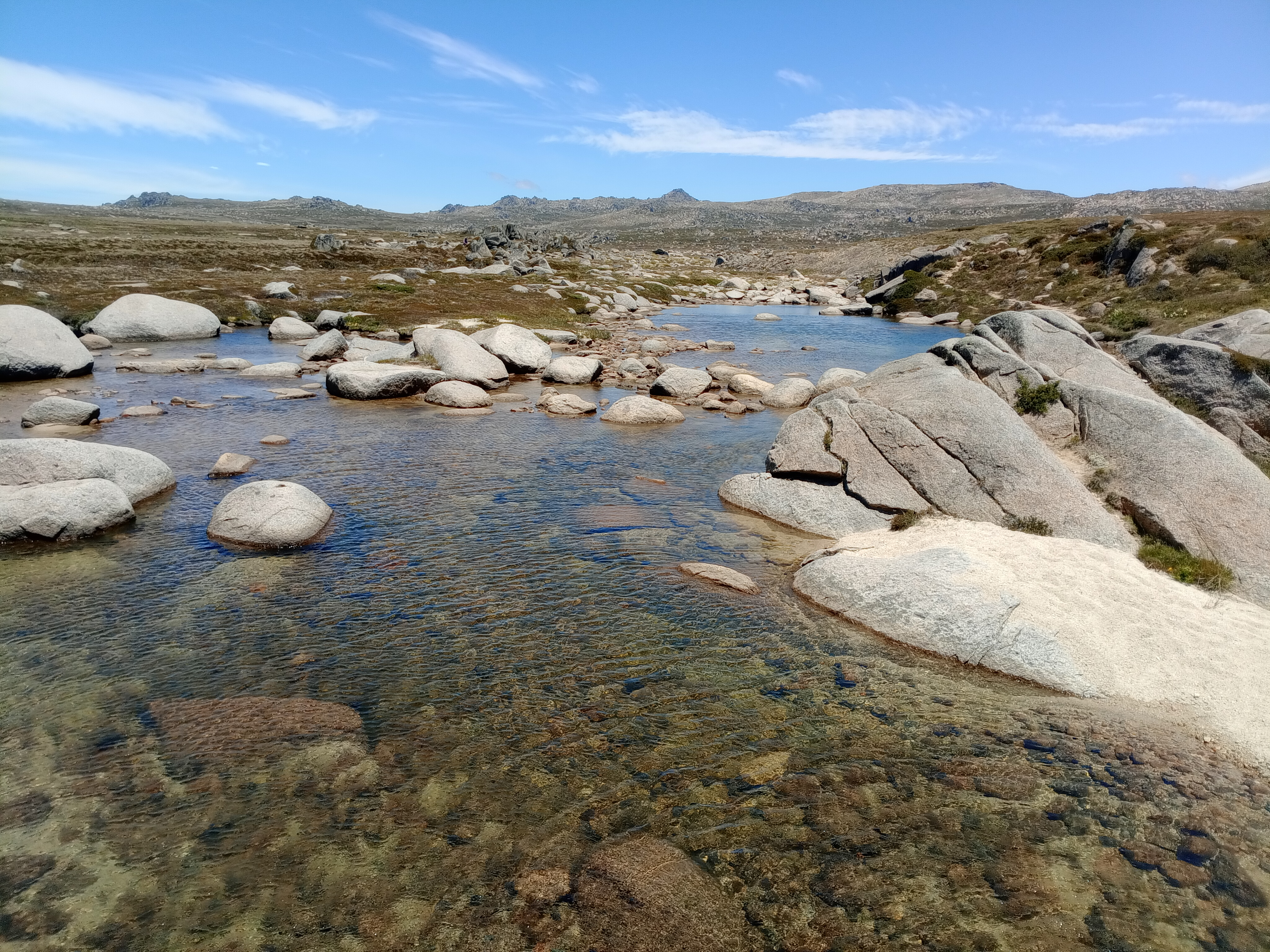
- The Snowy River pictured near its headwaters, December 2024.

- Location of the mouth of the river in Australia
- Etymology: Named by John Lhotsky in 1834
- Nickname: The Snowy
- Native name: Douriango (Ngarigu)

Location
- Country: Australia
- States: New South Wales, Victoria
- Region: South-east Australia
- Towns: Jindabyne (NSW), Orbost (Vic), Marlo (Vic)

Physical characteristics
- Source: Australian Alps, Great Dividing Range
  - location: below Mount Stilwell, New South Wales
  - elevation: 2,200 m (7,200 ft)
- Mouth: Bass Strait
  - location: Marlo, Victoria
  - coordinates: 37°47′S 148°31′E
  - elevation: 0 m (0 ft)
- Length: 352 km (219 mi)
- Basin size: 15,779 km^{2} (6,092 mi^{2})
- Discharge
  - location: mouth
  - average: 75 m^{3}/s (2,400 GL/a)

Basin features
- River system: Snowy River
- Tributaries
  - left: Moonbah River, Maclaughlin River, Jacobs River, Deddick River, Rodger River
  - right: Delegate River, Wullwye Creek, Pinch River, Suggan Buggan River, Buchan River, Brodribb River
- Waterfalls: Stone Bridge, Corrowong, Snowy, and Pinch
- National parks: Kosciuszko NP, Alpine NP, Snowy River NP

The Snowy River (Douriango in the Ngarigo language) is a major river in south-eastern Australia. It originates on the slopes of Mount Kosciuszko, Australia's highest mainland peak, draining the eastern slopes of the Snowy Mountains in New South Wales, before flowing through the Alpine National Park and the Snowy River National Park in Victoria and emptying into Bass Strait.

While the river's course and surroundings have remained almost entirely unchanged, the majority of it being protected by the Snowy River National Park, its flow was drastically reduced in the mid-20th century, to less than 1% (as measured at Jindabyne), after the construction of four large dams (Guthega, Island Bend, Eucumbene, and Jindabyne) and many smaller diversion structures in its headwaters in New South Wales, as part of the Snowy Mountains Scheme.

The river has been immortalised in cultural folklore through the poem The Man from Snowy River, written by Banjo Paterson in 1890, which formed the basis of many subsequent works in film, TV and music theatre.

== Geography ==
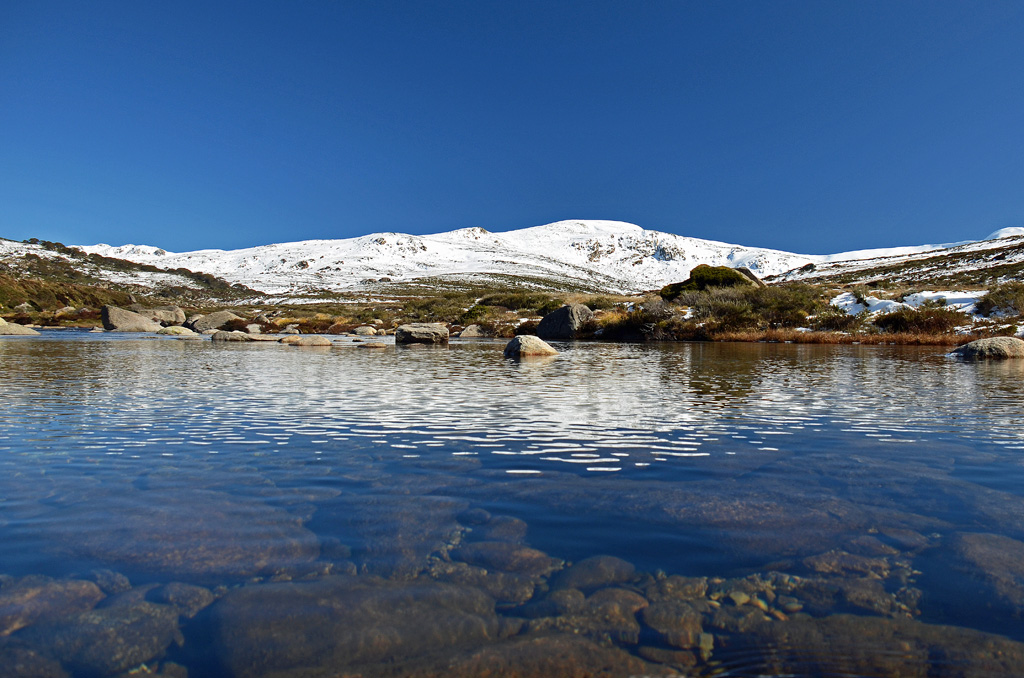
Headwaters of the Snowy River, with Mount Kosciuszko beyond

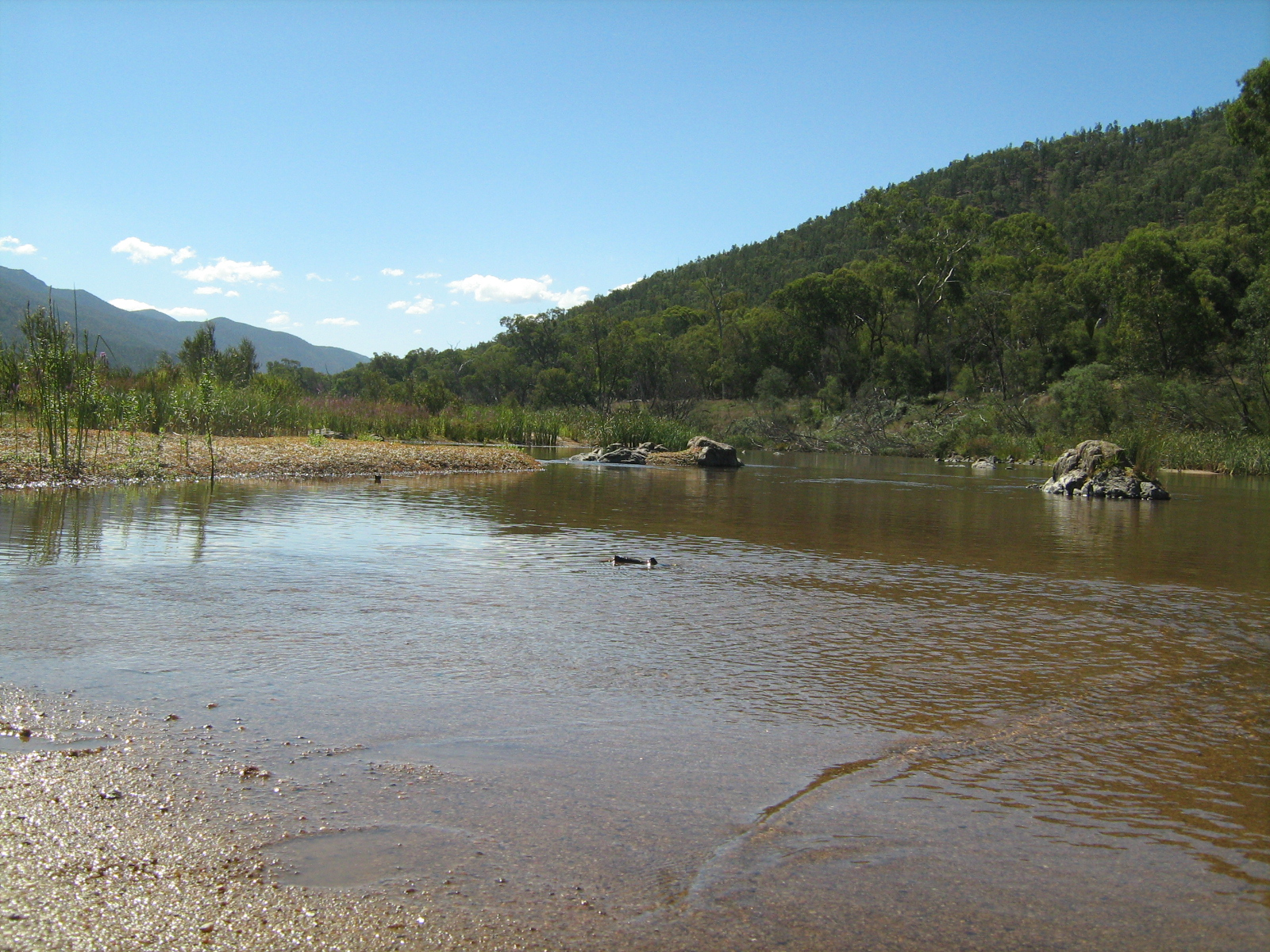
The Snowy River near Suggan Buggan, in Victoria, 2008

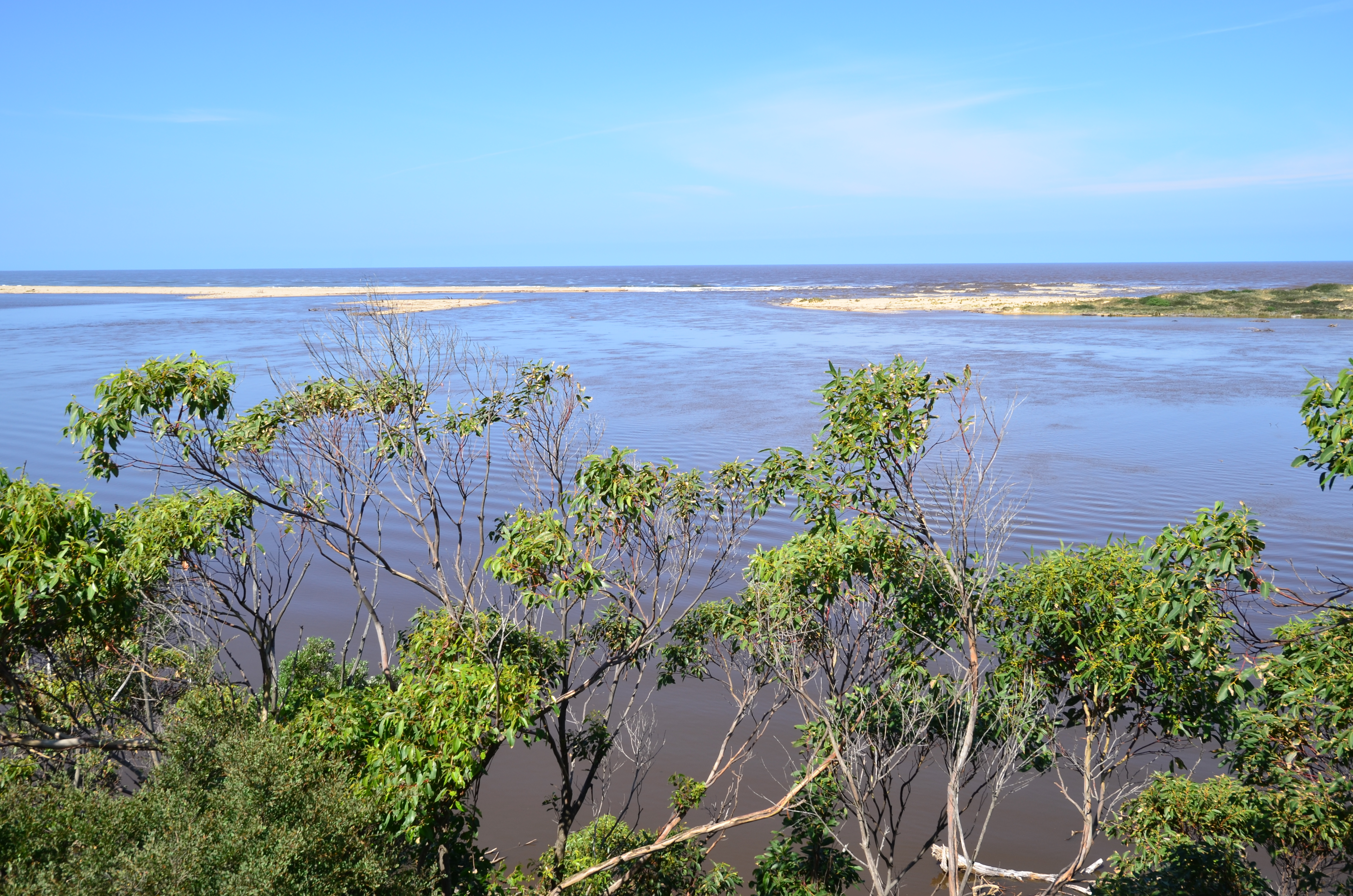
Snowy River mouth at Marlo in flood, 2012

The main headwaters of the Snowy River, which include the Eucumbene, Gungarlin and Thredbo rivers and many smaller alpine watercourses, are predominantly located in Kosciuszko National Park and meet near Jindabyne. From this point, the river winds 352 kilometres (219 mi) southwards through inaccessible country, comprising private lands and the Snowy River National Park, eventually reaching the sea in the Snowy Inlet, at Marlo, near Orbost.

In New South Wales, the river runs through the Snowy Monaro Regional Council. The tributaries of the Snowy River below Jindabyne include: the Mowamba, Wullwye Creek, Maclaughlin, Delegate, Jacobs, Pinch, Suggan Buggan, Deddick, Buchan, Rodger and Brodribb rivers. At a pinch point named Hutchings pass, water flows uphill.

In 1986, Jennings and Mabbutt mapped four geomorphic classes in the Snowy River Basin; (i) Australian Alps; (ii) the Monaro Tablelands; (iii) the East Victorian Uplands and (iv) the Gippsland Plains. Each class is physically distinct from the others.

=== Rainfall ===
The general distribution of rainfall over the Snowy River drainage basin (catchment) is controlled by orographic effects. There is a strong rainfall gradient across the basin.

The highest average annual rainfall is recorded in the higher alpine reaches of the Snowy Catchment, with 1,800 millimetres (70.9 in) recorded in areas above 1,500 metres (4,900 ft). The lowest average rainfall is recorded in the rain shadow affected north eastern catchment on the Monaro Plains around Dalgety, with average rain below 500 millimetres (20 in). The lower eastern sub-catchments are more strongly influenced by coastal rainfall patterns. For example, peak rainfall in the Delegate catchment is strongly influenced by east coast lows, rather than the alpine dominated precipitation patterns in the upper Snowy River catchment. These local variations in rainfall result in distinctly different hydrology in the rivers across the Snowy River catchment.

=== Hydrology ===
The snow melt derived rivers in the Snowy Mountains typically have the lowest average stream flow in the months from November to June, with October having the largest monthly flows of the year, e.g., mean monthly flow for October at Dalgety was 283,973 megalitres (62,465×10^{6} imp gal; 75,018×10^{6} US gal) prior to the Snowy Scheme. The large flows in September and October are derived from snowmelt and hydrologically it is one of the key aspects that defines these mountain waterways. Typically, Australian rivers can be defined as having highly variable river flows, with frequent zero flows even in humid areas, due to the extreme age of soils and consequent extremely high water absorption, which allows plants to absorb minimal phosphorus via proteoid and similar root types. The mixed snowmelt-rainfall rivers of the Snowy Mountains can be defined by strong seasonal patterns and remain permanent throughout the year, with no record of zero flow ever observed in the Lower Snowy. Prolonged base flows over the summer months are another feature of these types of rivers, driven by snowmelt derived groundwater.

In the lower reaches of the Snowy River catchment, the larger tributaries have a flow regime that is distinctly different from the snowmelt rivers of the Alps. These tributaries are typically dominated by the winter rainfall and often have peak monthly flows a few months earlier than the snow melt tributaries. The peak monthly flows for these lower Snowy River tributaries occur in June through July. Additionally, the flow regime in the lower tributaries is far more variable and unpredictable.

=== Waterfalls ===
The Snowy River below Jindabyne Dam contains four major waterfalls; Stone Bridge Falls, Corrowong Falls, Snowy Falls and Pinch Falls. Potentially, many of these waterfalls act as barriers for the large scale movement of aquatic species in the main stem of the Snowy River. The flows required to drown out the largest barrier, Snowy Falls, are potentially larger than the environmental water releases to the river via Jindabyne Dam.

== Parklands and protected areas ==
Around 70–80% of the Snowy River's length is protected by national parks, these include, from upstream to downstream:

- Kosciuszko National Park — New South Wales
- Alpine National Park — Victoria
- Snowy River National Park — Victoria

== River ecology ==
The aquatic flora and fauna of the snowy mountain snow melt rivers have evolved with the predictable seasonal hydrological snow melt peaks and constant summer base flow conditions. Many of these flora and fauna are coldwater specialists.

=== River habitat ===
The instream habitat of the Snowy River below Jindabyne has changed. Many of the in-stream features of a large upland river are not evident today. The substrate was previously typified by a clean cobble stone substrate. Today, the river channel has contracted and the substrate has a heavy cover of sediment, overlying much of the cobble stone riverbed.

The bushfires of 2002–03 added to this problem, as large amounts of sediment and organic matter were deposited in the river via tributary inflows. This input of sediment lead to the substrate becoming finer. This pattern of increased silt in the pools of rivers and streams has been observed across the Snowy Mountains following the bushfires. These bushfires are likely to have a long lasting influence on these waterways.

Larger events are required to start to improve the condition of the river bed. Events of 1,000 megalitres (220×10^{6} imp gal; 260×10^{6} US gal) per day will start to move the unconsolidated fine particles of the riverbed. Events between 1,000 and 3,000 megalitres (220×10^{6} and 660×10^{6} imp gal; 260×10^{6} and 790×10^{6} US gal) per day are important for conditioning the riffle habitats (i.e., a type of flowing water habitat).

The current poor condition of the river bed is one of the key factors inhibiting the aquatic fauna typical in a snow melt river.

=== Water quality ===
The mountain streams and rivers are typically low in nutrients and electrical conductivity. Conductivity is generally below 50 μS/cm.

Large dams can essentially influence downstream water quality via two key mechanisms, either by poor water quality released from the waters of the dam itself and reduced mixing of the river water column attributable to lower water velocities leading to anoxic conditions at the bottom of deep river pools.

==== Influence of Jindabyne Dam on water quality ====
Possibly the main influence on downstream water quality from Jindabyne Dam, is the influence on water temperature. Unlike many other dams where coldwater pollution is a concern, where water is released from the below the thermocline in the reservoir (i.e. the bottom water of the lake), the water is released from the surface waters of Lake Jindabyne. The water temperature of the Snowy River downstream can reach temperatures of 19 °C (66 °F) in summer.

The Snowy River is on average 4 °C (7 °F) warmer than the surrounding unregulated snow melt rivers, with a peak difference of up to 8 °C (14 °F). The water temperature in spring appears to be the greatly warmer than the surrounding snow melt rivers.

==== Thermal stratification ====
Thermal stratification in the river reaches below Jindabyne is typically restricted to a few of the larger or deeper pools. In general thermal stratification is spatially restricted to the pools that are typically greater than 4–5 metres (13–16 ft) deep. Pools shallower than 4 metres (13 ft) have not displayed any thermal stratification.

Stratification can occur between October and March, but typically does not persist for very long in the Snowy River in the Jindabyne Gorge. Breakdown of thermal stratification is frequently driven by the cooling overnight air temperature. This region experiences a very large temperature range between day and night (i.e. diurnal temperature range).

=== Algae ===
Algae is present in the water column and on the bed of the Snowy River. The water column algae is called phytoplankton, whereas the riverbed algae is defined as periphyton (attached algae).

==== Riverbed algae ====
Much of the bed of the Snowy River below Jindabyne contains high levels of attached algae. These taxa are typically filamentous algae. In the snowy mountains rivers unaffected by water diversions, large stands of filamentous algae are uncommon.

==== Water column algae ====
During 2008–09, the river pools of Jindabyne Gorge and the Dalgety uplands were typically dominated by blue green algae. Two blue green algae Aphanotheca spp. and Aphanocaspa spp. comprise about 25% of the total abundance. However, these abundances are still under the guidelines and its unclear if this is solely related to river regulation, but also reflects other catchment inputs.

The composition of algae in the free flowing snow melt rivers are typically defined by diatoms. Over 58% of taxa are diatoms, with Fragilaria spp. being the most numerically abundant taxa.

=== Water bugs ===
The water bugs in the Snowy River differ from the bugs of the snowmelt rivers. Dams have been shown to have an adverse impact on the water bugs of rivers.

Caenid mayflies (riffles) and oligochaete worms (pool edges) are generally typical of the upland regulated Snowy River. Other studies have also found greater densities of Caenidae mayflies in regulated rivers compared to unregulated rivers. Reduced high flows and constant low flows in the upper Snowy River are likely to have favoured high densities of worms through the buildup of silt and organic matter in the pools. Nichols et al. (2006) and Petts et al. (1993) also found greater densities of segmented worms associated with soft sediments and coarse organic debris in response to river regulation. Chironomids were also numerically dominant in riffles sampled in the regulated Snowy River. This response has been found in many other studies of regulated rivers and has been attributed to an increase of periphytic growth in riffles that increased overall habitat area and food availability.

Conoesucidae caddisflies (riffles), larval and adult elmids (riffles) and Oniscigastridae (pool edges) distinguished the snow melt rivers from regulated Snowy River. Marchant and Hehir (2002) reported that AUSRIVAS models (>50% probability) predicted Conoesucidae and elmids to be present in the upper Snowy River, but these taxa were not found in their study. The greater density of these taxa in snowmelt rivers compared the Snowy River is consistent with river regulation.

Marchant and Hehir attribute the absence of these taxa to dams acting as a barrier to drift and limiting recolonisation of these taxa and not to flow regulation. The upper Snowy River sites are all below the confluence of the Mowamba River which provides a pathway for recolonisation of the Snowy River. Therefore, the reduced flow and altered flow regime is likely to be the primary cause of reduced densities of these taxa in the upper Snowy River rather than the barrier effects of Jindabyne Dam. There is little information on the responses of Oniscigastridae to reduced flows and altered flow regimes, but it is probable that an elevated temperature regime combined with lack of suitable sandy edge habitat has reduced their densities in the Snowy River.

=== Fish ===
The fish assemblage of the Snowy River below Jindabyne are clearly divided into two components. This division is based on that which occurred in the upper catchment (above Snowy Falls) and that in the lower catchment (below Snowy Falls).

The major differences between the two zones were the low abundance or absence of diadromous migratory fish (except eels) and the greater abundance of short-finned eel and trout in the upper catchment, and the greater abundance of Australian smelt, congolli and long-finned eel below Snowy Falls. These upper and lower Snowy River zone differences were greater than the differences between un-regulated tributary streams and the highly regulated main channel of the Snowy River within either zone. In the upper catchment, river blackfish, brown trout and short-finned eel were more abundant in un-regulated tributaries, whilst long-finned eel and goldfish were more abundant in the regulated upper part of the Snowy River. In the lower zone, eastern gambusia, long-finned eel, Australian smelt, short-finned eel and congolli were all more abundant in Snowy River while common galaxias and short-headed lamprey were more abundant at tributaries.

== Flow thresholds below Jindabyne ==
River scientists are currently undertaking studies to determine the flow thresholds for a range of riverine processes. Some preliminary flow thresholds that have been developed include:

Discharge ML/day	River process
~300	Initial wetting of lower benches- old riverbed (Dalgety uplands)
850–1,000	Breakdown of thermal stratification (Jindabyne gorge)
1,000	Movement of fine silt from riverbed and initiating movement in unconsolidated coarse sands up to about 1.9 mm
1,000–3,000	Shear stress velocities across riffles are substantially greater than in pools (riffle maintenance)
10,370	Passage for Adult Australian Bass (Pinch Falls)
13,350	Passage for Juvenile Australian Bass (Pinch Falls)

Further defining of ecological flow thresholds is currently in progress via modelling, field based studies, and flow trials. See Snowy Flow Response Monitoring and Modelling.

== History of water management ==
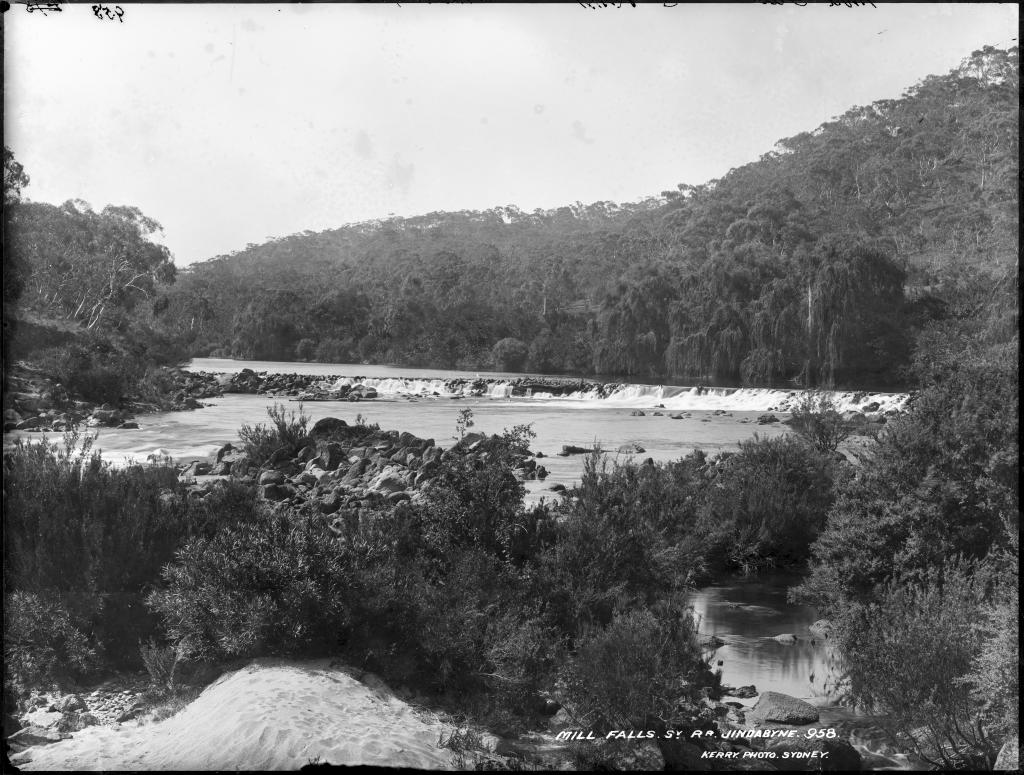
'Mill Falls' at Jindabyne

=== Early history ===
The Snowy River was initially utilised sustainably as a food and water resource by Indigenous Australians for around 30,000–40,000 years prior to European settlement. Evidence of human occupation at Cloggs Cave, near the Snowy River, near Buchan, was dated at up to 17,000 years. Despite the cold climate in the river's higher reaches, the Ngarigo nation held territory around the Australian Alps and the Snowy Mountains in modern-day New South Wales. As the river flowed southwards into modern day Victoria, it flowed in the Gunai nation's territory, particularly, the Krauatungalung clan's territory.

The first use of the Snowy River, for the extraction of energy, was by a water-powered flour mill, fed from a low weir across the river at Jindabyne. It was constructed by Stewart Ryrie Jr in 1847, and operated until around 1889.

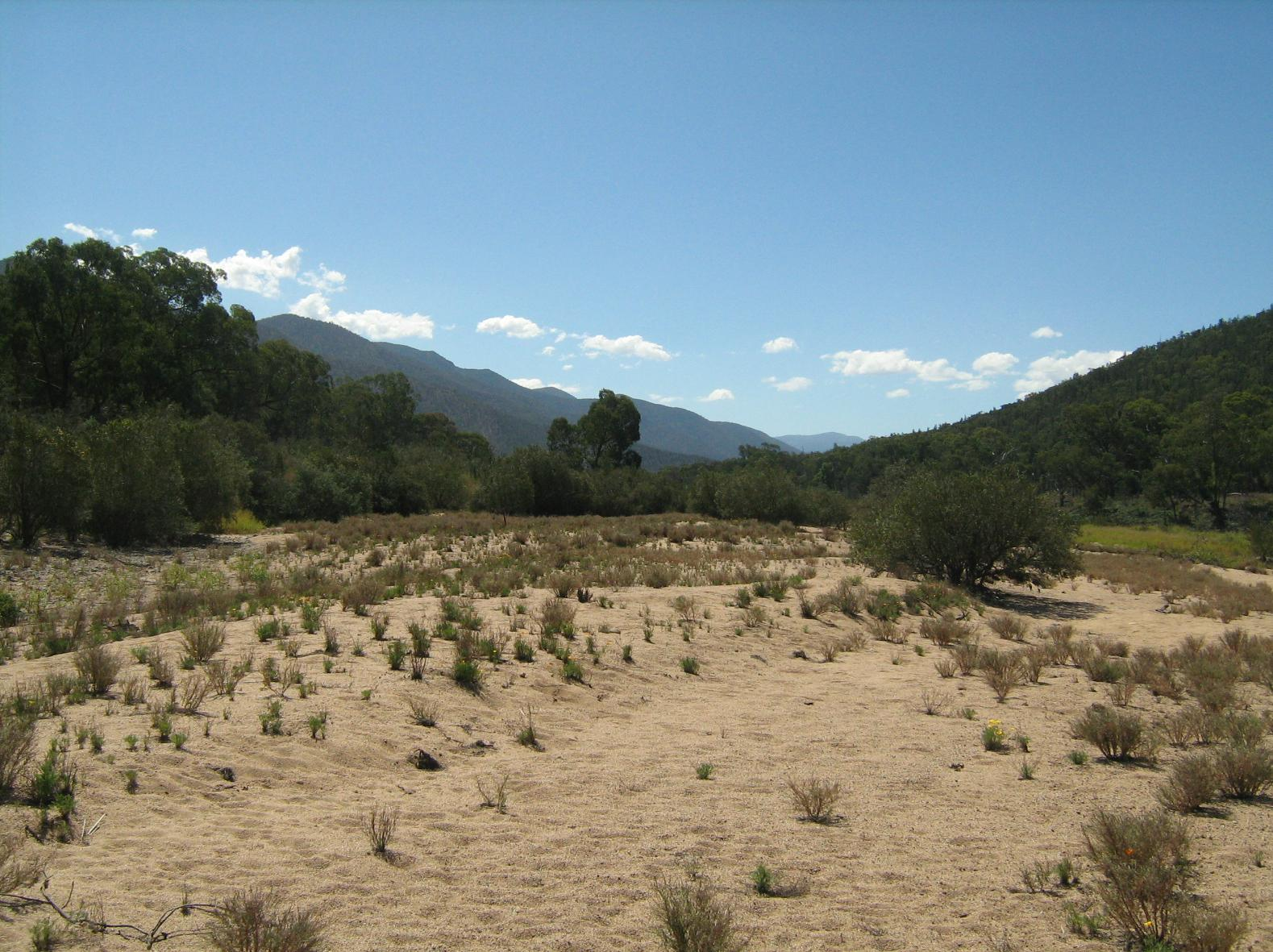
Exposed riverbed just south of the NSW/VIC border is a result of the reduction of the river's water flow by 99%

=== 1950–1990s reduced water flow ===
The Snowy River originally had a huge, often destructive flow during the spring snow-melt which flowed directly into the sea. In the 1950s and 1960s, as part of the Snowy Mountains Scheme, a network of four dams (i.e. Guthega, Island Bend, Eucumebene and Jindabyne) and many smaller water diversion structures were built to collect and divert 99% (as measured at Jindabyne) of the Snowy River's flow through the mountains, to provide more water to the Murray and Murrumbidgee River agricultural basins for irrigation. Several hydro-electric power stations were also constructed to generate electricity. While there was initial public opposition to the diversion of the river's water during the 1950s and '60s, it was largely ignored as the scheme provided agriculture with more water. It generated a large number of jobs in construction initially, then in agriculture and logistics, and added permanent and reliable, on-demand electricity generation to two states.

=== 1990s–2000: Increased awareness ===
By the 1990s, the reduced flows in the Snowy River became a major environmental concern in Victoria, New South Wales and across Australia. After the scheme was built downstream flows were insufficient to keep the channel clear of vegetation or move sediment in the stream bed. Salt water intrusion extended seven to ten kilometres up the estuary and outdoor recreational activities were curtailed along the lower reaches of the river.

This period of increased awareness of the impacts of water diversions led to the Snowy Water Inquiry, which looked at options to improve the health of the Snowy River. The key outcomes of the Snowy Water Inquiry was an initial agreement to increase environmental water releases to the Snowy River below Jindabyne by 15% and the Snowy Montane Rivers.

These series of staged flow targets (up to 28% of mean annual natural discharge) were set for the Snowy River below Jindabyne, with these dependent on water savings in the Murray and Murrumbidgee River catchments. The targets included 15% by 2009 and 21% by 2012.

=== 2002–2006: Environmental water releases from the Mowamba River in a low allocation period ===
From 28 August 2002 until January 2006, the first stage of environmental water was released to the Snowy River via the Mowamba River. The Mowamba River aqueduct was "turned out", preventing water being diverted to Jindabyne Dam. The releases from the Mowamba River essentially doubled the daily discharge at Dalgety from about 40 to 80 megalitres (8.8×10^{6} to 17.6×10^{6} imp gal; 11×10^{6} to 21×10^{6} US gal) per day. Additionally, it provided a small snow melt signal, peaking in September. Only a small percentage of the Mowamba River catchment is covered by snow in winter, compared to some of the upper catchments in the Snowy River catchment. Additionally, the release increased daily river flow variability, between 3 and 523 megalitres (660×10^{3} and 115,040×10^{3} imp gal; 790×10^{3} and 138,160×10^{3} US gal) per day, and the timing of flows was in keeping with natural events across the catchment. These small discharges saw a 20% increase in wetted habitat and a doubling of running water habitat (i.e. riffles) in the upper reaches of the Snowy River in the Dalgety Uplands, whereas the rest of the river saw a decline in discharge due to the prevailing drought.

This stage increased flows from 1% to approximately 4% of mean annual river discharge. Typically an annual release of 38 gigalitres (8.4×10^{9} imp gal; 1.0×10^{10} US gal) per year.

=== 2006–2010: Environmental water releases from Jindabyne Dam in a low allocation period ===
After the completion of capital works (i.e. multi-level offtake and the cone values) at Jindabyne Dam the environmental water releases were essentially released from Jindabyne Dam, rather than the Mowamba River. The second stage of environmental flow releases saw a very small increase in the median flow rate, but also a decline in daily flow variability compared to base flow compared to stage one.

Overall the annual volume released remained around 38GL year given the historical record drought.

=== 2010–2011: Environmental water releases in a higher allocation period ===
During this stage the "Water for Rivers" were able to secure more water entitlements (i.e. up 190 gigalitres (4.2×10^{10} imp gal; 5.0×10^{10} US gal)) in the Western Rivers and the allocations increased as the drought broke in South Eastern Australia. Actual allocations are weather dependent, so in dry periods the allocation will be smaller than during wet periods. During this period the annual water availability jumped from about 38 to 150 gigalitres (8.4×10^{9} to 3.30×10^{10} imp gal; 1.0×10^{10} to 4.0×10^{10} US gal) per annum. Although water is released all year, this period has seen two significant spring snow melt environmental water releases to the Snowy River.

In November 2010 the first spring snow melt release occurred. This small but important release had a peak discharge of 3,080 megalitres (680,000,000 imp gal; 810,000,000 US gal) per day, and was sufficient to start to scour the fines sediment from some sections of the bed of the Snowy.

In October 2011, with substantially greater water available a much larger spring snow melt release has occurred i.e. 84 gigalitres (1.8×10^{10} imp gal; 2.2×10^{10} US gal) over 19 days. This second and substantially larger release with a peak discharge rate of 12,000 megalitres (2.6×10^{9} imp gal; 3.2×10^{9} US gal) per day over three days is expected to scour the bed of the river. This releases targeted much larger particles, up to the size of 256 millimetres (10.1 in), as the bed of the river is heavily "armoured" and larger flows are required to move these particles to improve the instream habitat of the river. Once the armouring had been removed it is expected the fine sediment would be scoured within the river bed profile.

== Politics ==
A political campaign began, which aimed to increase the water flow from 1% to 28% of its original flow from the dam at Jindabyne. An independent candidate from the East Gippsland district, Craig Ingram, was elected to the Victorian Legislative Assembly in 1999 and re-elected in 2002 and 2006, on a platform to increase the flow of water in the Snowy River.

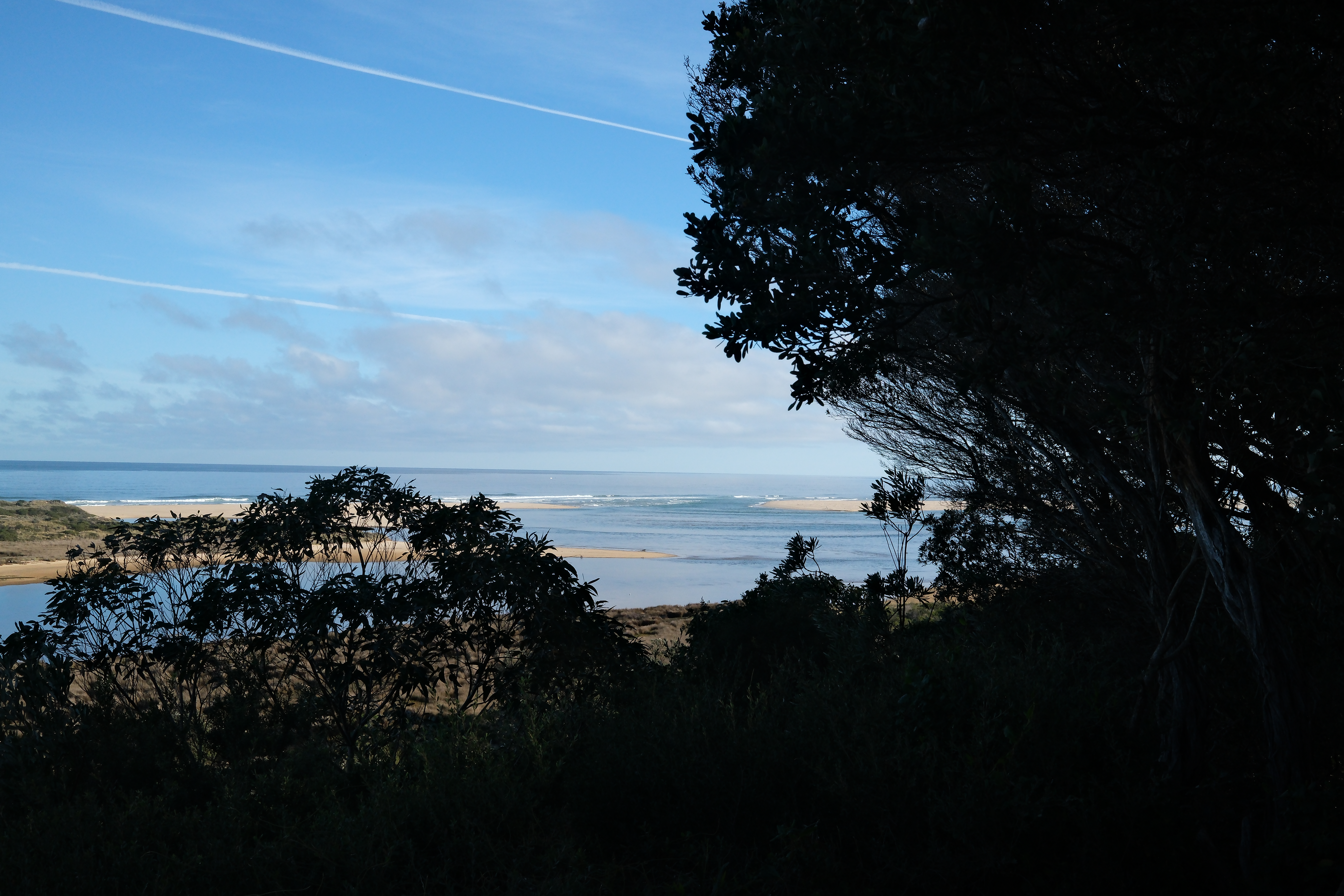
View of the mouth of the Snowy River.

After Ingram was elected to office, he became instrumental in the three shareholding governments reaching agreement to return of up to 28% ANF of an environmental flow to the Snowy River which was an outcome of the corporatisation of the Snowy Scheme, swinging the Victorian Government to sign the legislation. Although the Victorian, NSW and Federal governments promised that corporatisation would not lead to privatisation, in November 2005 they announced their intention to sell Snowy Hydro through a public float. Community groups rallied to stop the sale of Snowy Hydro and by June 2006 the Australian Prime Minister withdrew the Commonwealth's intention to sell Snowy Hydro.

== Cultural references ==
The poem The Man from Snowy River was written by 'Banjo' Paterson in 1890, which formed the basis of many subsequent works in film, TV and music theatre.

The natural environment surrounding the Snowy River formed part of the subject matter and setting for the 'Banjo' Paterson poem The Man from Snowy River, first published in 1890. The Snowy River has also been immortalised in a 1920 The Man from Snowy River silent film, as well as in the better-known 1982 Fox film The Man from Snowy River and its 1988 Disney sequel film The Man from Snowy River II (U.S. title: "Return to Snowy River" – UK title: "The Untamed"), as well as in The Man from Snowy River (TV series) and The Man from Snowy River: Arena Spectacular, all of which were based on the Banjo Paterson's poem.

== Settlements ==
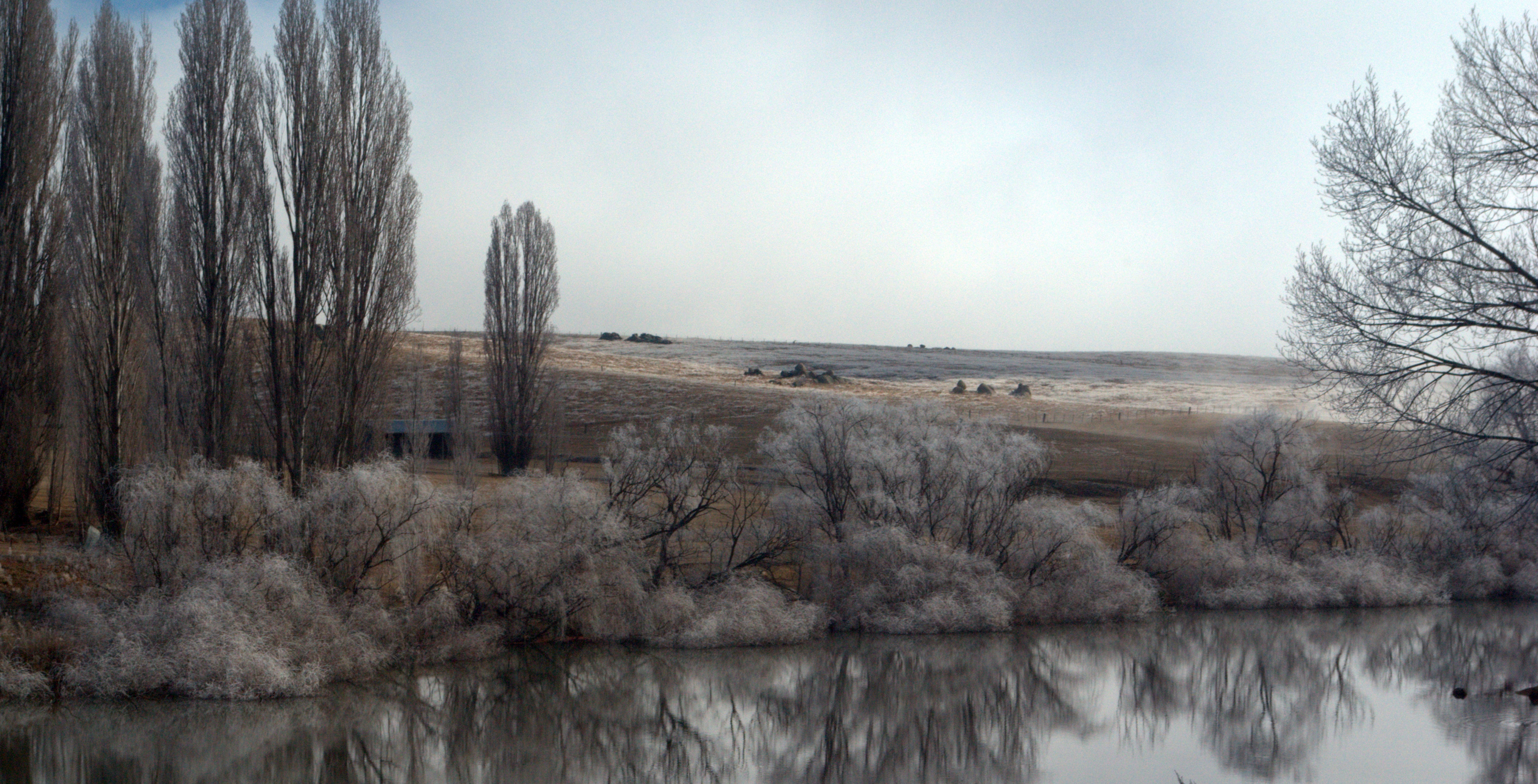
The Snowy River, at the small NSW town of Dalgety

There are very few towns located on the Snowy River, the following is a list of towns that sit on the Snowy River, ordered from upstream to downstream;

New South Wales

- Guthega ski village
- Jindabyne
- Dalgety
- Ironmungy (nearby)

Victoria

- Willis
- Suggan Buggan (nearby)
- Buchan (nearby)
- Orbost
- Marlo

== Crossings ==
New South Wales

- Summit Road (closed to vehicles) – Mount Kosciuszko
- Main Range Walk (ford, closed to vehicles) – Charlotte Pass
- Illawong suspension bridge (pedestrians only)
- Guthega Dam Wall (closed to vehicles)
- Munyang (Guthega) Power Station
- Island Bend Fire Trail at Gungarlin River
- Kosciuszko Road – Jindabyne
- Romero
- Snowy River Way – Dalgety

Victoria

- McKillops Bridge – McKillops Road
- Princes Highway – Orbost

== See also ==
- List of rivers of Australia
- Public Fight to Stop the Sale of Snowy Hydro
