= Moredun Creek =

Coordinates: 30°10′S 151°05′E

Location
- Country: Australia

Physical characteristics
- Source
  - location: New South Wales

Moredun Creek is a river of the state of New South Wales in Australia.

== See also ==
- List of rivers of Australia
