= Burke River (New South Wales) =

River in New South Wales, Australia

Coordinates: 34°27′S 150°35′E

Burke Wombat Creek

Location
- Country: Australia
- State: New South Wales
- Region: Sydney Basin (IBRA), Southern Highlands
- Municipality: Wingecarribee

Physical characteristics
- Source: Southern Highlands
  - location: near Mount Murray
  - elevation: 635 m (2,083 ft)
- Mouth: confluence with the Nepean River
  - location: near Yerrinbool
  - elevation: 324 m (1,063 ft)
- Length: 22 km (14 mi)

Basin features
- River system: Hawkesbury-Nepean catchment
- Tributaries
  - right: Little Burke River (New South Wales)
- Reservoir: Lake Nepean

The Burke River, a watercourse that is part of the Nepean River catchment, is located in the Southern Highlands of New South Wales, Australia.

The Burke River rises on the western slopes of Macquarie Pass, below Mount Murray, and flows generally to the north, before reaching its confluence with the Nepean River, as it is impounded by Lake Nepean. The river descends 312 metres (1,024 ft) over its 22-kilometre (14 mi) course.

The river flows within the Water Supply Reserve of Greater Sydney.

== See also ==
- List of rivers of New South Wales (A–K)
- List of rivers of Australia
- Rivers of New South Wales
