= New South Wales North Coast =

- Region
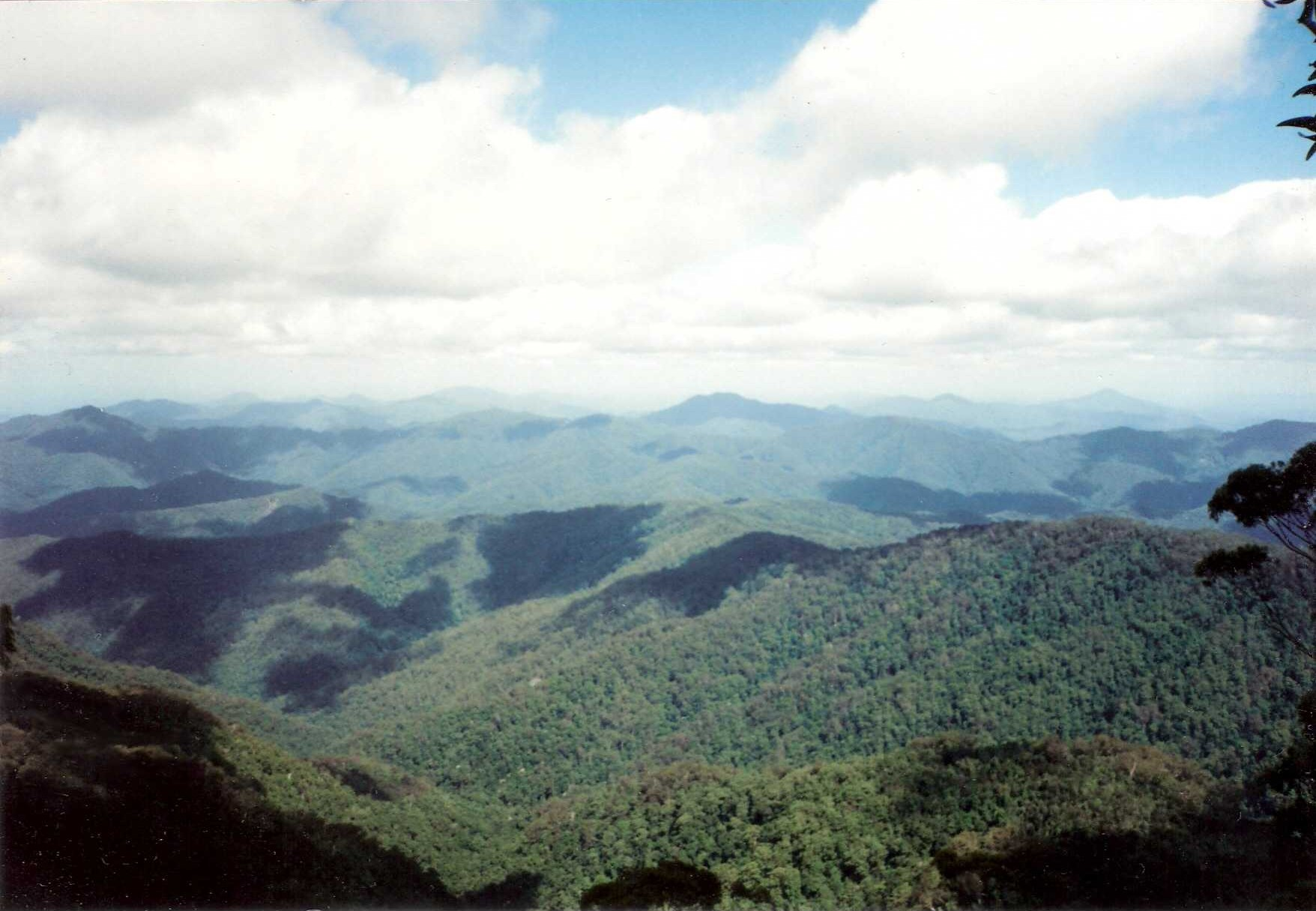
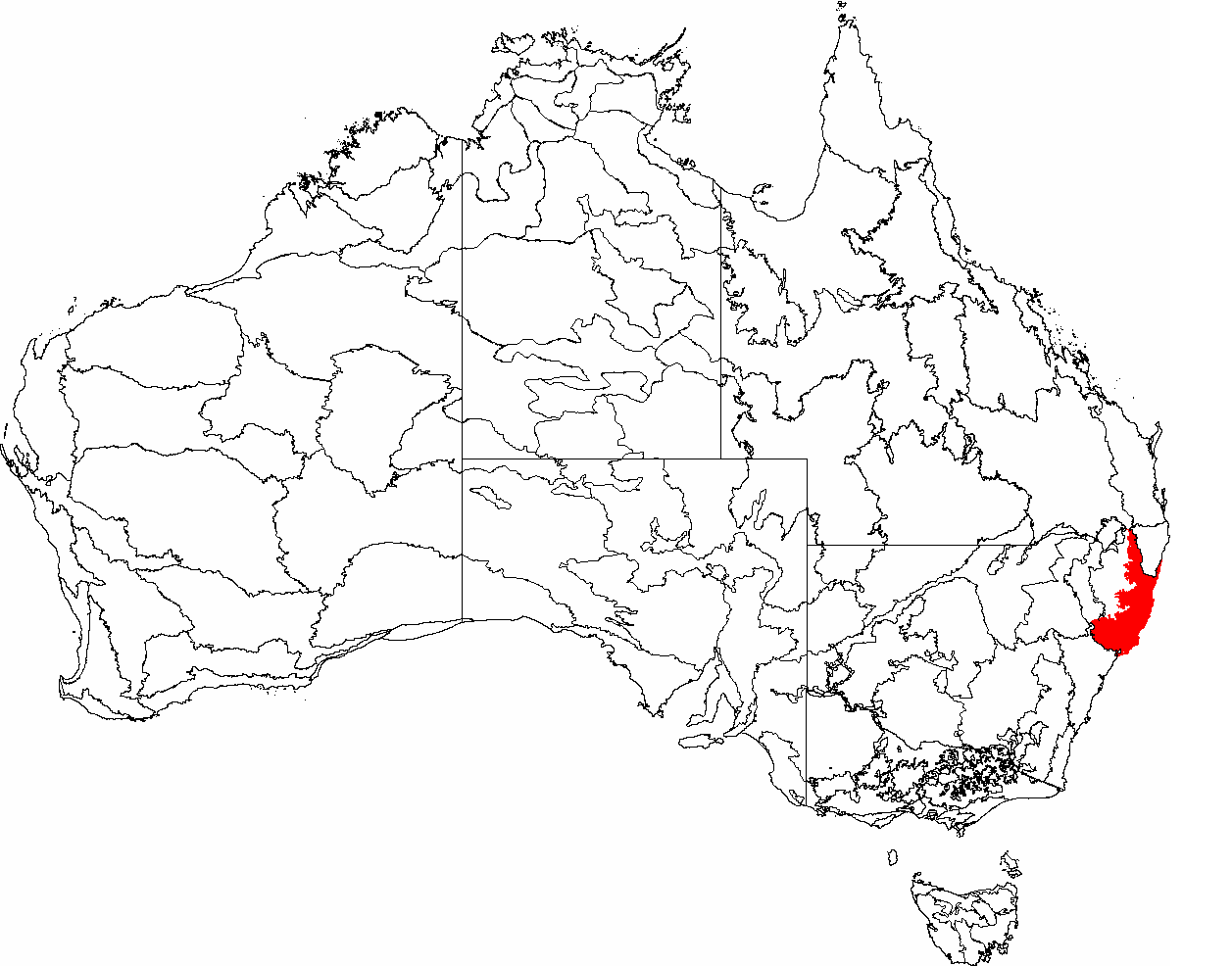
- View east over the NSW North Coast towards the Tasman Sea overlooking the Bellinger River valley. The interim Australian bioregions, with New South Wales North Coast in red.
- Country: Australia
- State: New South Wales
- LGA(s): Bellingen, Clarence Valley, Coffs Harbour, Kempsey, Mid-Coast, Nambucca Valley, Port Macquarie-Hastings, Richmond Valley

Government
  - State electorate(s): Ballina, Clarence, Coffs Harbour, Myall Lakes, Oxley, Port Macquarie, Tweed
  - Federal division(s): Cowper, Lyne, Page, Richmond

Area
  - Total: 39,966 km^{2} (15,431 sq mi)
Localities around New South Wales North Coast
New England Tablelands	South Eastern Queensland	South Pacific Ocean
Brigalow Belt South	New South Wales North Coast	South Pacific Ocean
South Eastern Highlands	Sydney Basin	Tasman Sea

New South Wales North Coast or NSW North Coast, an interim Australian bioregion, is located in New South Wales, comprising 3,996,591 hectares (9,875,790 acres).

== Subregions ==
In the IBRA system it has the code of (NNC), and it has nineteen sub-regions:

IBRA regions and subregions: IBRA7
IBRA subregion	IBRA code	Area	
IBRA subregion	IBRA code	ha	acres
Washpool	NNC01	59,377	146,720
Cataract	NNC02	121,338	299,830
Dalmorton	NNC03	316,458	781,980
Chaelundi	NNC04	188,279	465,250
Yuraygir	NNC05	45,815	113,210
Coffs Coast and Escarpment	NNC06	308,115	761,370
Macleay Hastings	NNC07	729,170	1,801,800
Carrai Plateau	NNC08	20,100	50,000
Macleay Gorges	NNC09	153,349	378,930
Upper Manning	NNC10	83,181	205,540
Comboyne Plateau	NNC11	123,315	304,720
Mummel Escarpment	NNC12	400,916	990,690
Barrington	NNC13	110,903	274,050
Tomalla	NNC14	227,615	562,450
Ellerston	NNC15	113,183	279,680
Upper Hunter	NNC16	232,750	575,100
Karuah Manning	NNC17	602,423	1,488,620
Rocky River Gorge	NNC18	86,829	214,560
Guy Fawkes	NNC19	73,477	181,570
