= Bonang (disambiguation) =

Bonang is a Javanese musical instrument. Bonang may also refer to

- Bonang, a village in Rembang Regency, Indonesia
- Bonang River in Victoria, Australia
- Bonang Highway in south-eastern Australia
- Bonang Matheba (born 1987), South African TV and radio personality
- Sunan Bonang (1465–1525), Indonesian nobleman
- Neoglyphidodon bonang, a species of damselfish
