= Delegate River, Victoria =

Delegate River Victoria
- Coordinates: 37.1383333°S 148.7769444°E
- Population: 27 (2016 census)
- Postcode(s): 3888
- Location: 43 km (27 mi) SW of Bombala; 348 km (216 mi) NE of Melbourne
- LGA(s): Shire of East Gippsland
- State electorate(s): Gippsland East
- Federal division(s): Gippsland
Suburbs around Delegate River:
Bonang	Delegate (NSW)	Delegate (NSW)
Bonang	Delegate River	Bendoc
Bendoc	Bendoc	Bendoc

Delegate River is a locality in the Shire of East Gippsland, Victoria, Australia. It is situated on the river of the same name. In the 2016 census, Delegate River had a population of 27 people.

It is an isolated community, with the nearest Victorian doctors located two hours away. Much of Delegate River is state forest, with the southern and eastern sections of the locality situated in the Cottonwood State Forest and a western section of the locality in the Bonang State Forest.

It contains both the Delegate River Fire Station and the Bonang Satellite Fire Station. Delegate River has a hotel, the Delegate River Tavern. The heritage-listed Delegate River Diversion Tunnel is located within the locality.

Delegate River State School (No. 2809) opened on 16 May 1887. It variously operated over time as a half-time and full-time school with periods of being unstaffed before its final closure on 14 March 1956. A second school, variously known as Delegate River Upper or Delegate River Lower (No. 3452), was located on the site of the current CFA station; it opened on 6 May 1903 and closed in 1947. Delegate River Post Office opened as a receiving office c. 1902, was upgraded to a post office on 1 July 1927 and closed on 28 February 1961. Delegate River East Post Office opened c. 1921-23 and closed on 20 December 1968. The Delegate River locality was described in 1923 as consisting of "about twenty houses, a hall and a nice little school at which twenty-six children attend."

The locality adjoins the Victoria-New South Wales border, with the New South Wales town of Delegate on the other side. In 2006, formal ceremonies were held at Delegate River attended by the Governors of both states to mark the formal proclamation of the border through the area, which had never been formally proclaimed despite having been surveyed c. 1870.

Delegate River was threatened by the 2019-20 East Gippsland bushfires, in which the locality was subject to an evacuation order in early January. It had previously been threatened by fires in 2003.
