= Bonang Road =

Road in Australia

Bonang Road Victoria
- Coordinates: 37.046700°S 148.812872°E (North end); 37.711387°S 148.457943°E (South end)

General information
- Type: Road
- Length: 113.7 km (71 mi)
- Gazetted: 1933 (as State Highway); November 1990 (as Main Road)
- Route number(s): C612 (1998–present)
- Former route number: State Route 199 (1986–1998)

Major junctions
- North end: Delegate Road; VIC/NSW border
- McKillops Road; Marlo Road
- South end: Princes Highway; Orbost, Victoria

Location(s)
- Major suburbs: Goongerah

Bonang Road (formerly known as Bonang Highway) is a rural road in south-eastern Australia, running generally south–north. It links the Gippsland region coastal town of Orbost, Victoria and the highland Monaro region town of Bombala, New South Wales.

Much of the road is subject to bushfires during summer and may be closed briefly during the fire season.

== Route ==
Bonang Road commences on the Victorian side of the interstate border with New South Wales, south of the town Delegate in the Snowy Mountains of the Great Dividing Range, and heads south, passing through the settlements of Bonang, Goongerah and Nurran, running through valleys to the east of the Snowy River, eventually ending on the river's eastern bank, terminating at the intersection with Princes Highway at Orbost.

By October 2024 the road was sealed for its entire length. Due its narrow, twisting route, following steep sides of ridges and creeks, Bonang Road provides a slower journey (nearly three hours, as opposed to one and three-quarter hours) compared with the equal distance of the Princes Highway (route A1, Orbost to Cann River) and Monaro Highway (route B23, Cann River to Bombala) route. The loop from Orbost to Bombala, with a return via Monaro Highway, is well known to motorbike riders as a scenic but difficult ride.

== History ==
The road was established after 1852, to allow access for people going to the gold mining in the Bendoc area south of Delegate, and as an access road for logging and other forestry activities in the late 19th and early 20th centuries. It is still primarily used for access to forest plantations in the Victorian State Forest areas adjoining the Snowy River National Park to its west and Errinundra National Park to its east. The road gives access to the Valley of the Giants area where the old-growth forest is a tourist attraction.

The passing of the Country Roads Act 1912 through the Parliament of Victoria provided for the establishment of the Country Roads Board (later VicRoads) and their ability to declare Main Roads, taking responsibility for the management, construction and care of the state's major roads from local municipalities; the later passing of the Highways and Vehicles Act 1924 provided for the declaration of State Highways, roads two-thirds financed by the state government through the Country Roads Board. Bonang Highway was declared a State Highway in 1933, slowly constructed from Orbost through Bonang to Delegate over the border in New South Wales (for a total of 73 miles); before this declaration, the road was referred to as the Orbost-Delegate Road; the declaration was made for "this very important road, which is considered to be the most direct road from the Princes Highway to Canberra", a role later delegated to Cann Valley Road (later the Victorian section of Monaro Highway).

Bonang Highway was signed within Victoria as State Route 199 in 1986; with Victoria's conversion to the newer alphanumeric system in the late 1990s, this was replaced by route C612 (the New South Wales section remains unallocated).

The passing of the Transport Act 1983 updated the provision for the declaration of State Highways through the Road Construction Authority (later VicRoads). In this rare case, its status as a State Highway was downgraded to that of a Main Road, and Bonang Road was declared along the same alignment in November 1990, from the border with New South Wales and ending at Princes Highway in Orbost.

The passing of the Road Management Act 2004 granted the responsibility of overall management and development of Victoria's major arterial roads to VicRoads: in 2004, VicRoads re-declared the road as Bonang Road (Arterial #5952), beginning at the border with New South Wales and ending at Princes Highway in Orbost.

=== Aboriginal lands ===
The road passes through the land of three Australian Aborigine peoples: the Krauatungalang in the coastal lowlands, the Bidawal in the highlands, and the Ngarigo in the Monaro region.

=== The Snowy River Bandit ===
The road cuts through the region frequented by the Snowy River Bandit (also known as "The Butcher’s Ridge Bandit"), perhaps Australia's last bushranger, who frequented the forests of the area in 1940, robbing people of food and clothing at gunpoint at isolated houses and on the roads. He was arrested on 20 December 1940 by Victoria Police constables, after being discovered by timber workers who saw his morning fire. He was discovered to be Alan Torney (1911–?) who had earlier been determined to be insane and was an escapee from a mental hospital at Goulburn, New South Wales. He was re-committed and reportedly spent the rest of his life at the Ararat Asylum.

== Major intersections and towns ==
State	LGA	Location	km	mi	Destinations	Notes
New South Wales	Snowy Monaro	Delegate	0.0	0.0	Delegate Road – Delegate, Bombala	Road continues north as Delegate Road to Bombala
State border			0.0	0.0	New South Wales – Victoria state border	
Victoria	East Gippsland	Delegate River	0.0	0.0	Bonang Road (C612)	Northern terminus of road and route C612
Victoria	East Gippsland	Delegate River	2.9	1.8	Delegate River Road – Delegate River	
Victoria	Bonang River		17.6	10.9	Bridge (name unknown)	
Victoria	East Gippsland	Bonang	20.8	12.9	McKillops Road (C611) – Deddick Valley	
Victoria	East Gippsland	Bendoc	28.3	17.6	Bendoc-Orbost Rooad – Bendoc	
Victoria	East Gippsland	Orbost	111.8	69.5	Nicholson Street (north) – Orbost; Jarrahmond Road (west) – Jarrahmond	
Victoria	East Gippsland	Orbost	113.3	70.4	Marlo Road (C107) – Marlo, Cape Conran	
Victoria	East Gippsland	Orbost	113.7	70.6	Princes Highway (A1) – Melbourne, Bairnsdale, Eden	Southern terminus of road and route C612
1.000 mi = 1.609 km; 1.000 km = 0.621 mi: Route transition
