= Bendoc =

- Suburb
- Coordinates: 37.1909713°S 148.8800407°E
- Country: Australia
- State: Victoria
- LGA: Shire of East Gippsland
- Location: 41 km (25 mi) SW of Bombala; 353 km (219 mi) NE of Melbourne

Government
  - State electorate: Gippsland East
  - Federal division: Gippsland
- Elevation: 862 m (2,828 ft)

Population
  - Total: 115 (2016 census)
- Postcode: 3888
- Mean max temp: 16.1 °C (61.0 °F)
- Mean min temp: 2.8 °C (37.0 °F)
- Annual rainfall: 988.5 mm (38.92 in)
Suburbs around Bendoc
Delegate River	Delegate (NSW)	Craigie (NSW)
Bonang	Bendoc	Buldah
Goongerah	Combienbar	Buldah

Bendoc is a locality in the Shire of East Gippsland, Victoria, Australia. It sits on the Bendoc River. In the 2016 census, Bendoc had a population of 115 people.

== History ==
It was a mining town for many years after the discovery of gold in the Bendoc River in the 1850s, with dairying and sawmilling replacing mining as local industries in later years. The population decreased over time, from about 500 in 1903 to 210 in 1911 and 90 in 1933. The town now contains the Bendoc Hotel (also known as the Commercial Hotel), the Bendoc Hall, a post office, police station, church, cemetery and Country Fire Authority brigade. The town also has a progress association, which operates a neighbourhood house and library outreach centre.

Bendoc Police Station opened in 1869. Bendoc Post Office opened on 1 January 1896 and became a licensed post office on 14 July 1994. The Bendoc Cemetery was gazetted on 17 June 1892, replacing an earlier cemetery used from the late 1880s. It closed in 1925 but was reopened in the 1990s and is managed by the Bendoc Cemetery Trust.

The Bendoc Union Church was built in 1903 and is now listed on the Victorian Heritage Register. It continues to be owned by a community trust and is used by Anglicans, Catholics and Presbyterians. It is described as a "rare and perhaps unique surviving example of a Union church still used for its original purpose and still owned by a community trust".

Bendoc State School (No. 1166) opened in 1873, replacing an earlier fee-paying school, and closed in 1987. The building remains in the grounds of the town's SES facility. A second school, Bendoc Lower State School (No. 3267) opened on 8 September 1896 and closed in December 1956. The building is now used by the town's fishing club, while a third school, North Bendoc State School (No. 3801) opened on 18 April 1913 and closed on 22 April 1941.

A Court of Petty Sessions opened at Bendoc on 1 November 1966. The state Law Department, which had recommended against its construction, held that the court "should not be visited by a magistrate except in special circumstances". It became a Magistrates' Court in 1971 along with other Courts of Petty Sessions and closed on 1 January 1983. It heard only 29 cases between 1976 and 1981.

Much of the broader Bendoc locality, particularly in the southern half, is part of state or national parks, variously the Bendoc State Forest, Bonang State Forest and Errinundra National Park.

The heritage-listed Delegate River Diversion Tunnel sits near the boundary with Delegate River, while several surviving relics and sites from the mining era are locally heritage listed.

The town was threatened by the 2019-20 East Gippsland bushfires, during which it was subject to an evacuation order. The town was cut off for several days after the blaze cut the main highway into East Gippsland, and was one of the last communities to be reached by rescue services.

== Climate ==
Delegate has a cool oceanic climate (Cfb), with cool to mild summers that are frequently interrupted by cold fronts, and frequent snowfalls in winter and spring (and more rarely, late spring and early summer snowfalls). On average there are 14.7 snowy days per annum. Being on the southern face of the dividing range, the region is shielded from the westerly storm track (in which case it would experience foehn winds), however its position well-south of the Monaro rain shadow exposes it to southerly and south-westerly systems. The latter is apparent in its high winter–spring precipitation and low maximum temperatures compared to Cooma or Bombala further north in the rain shadow proper.

The annual mean minimum temperature of 2.8 °C (37.0 °F), is extraordinarily low for its elevation. This is almost equal to that of Thredbo Village nearly 600 metres (2,000 ft) higher, showing the steep latitudinal gradient between the 36th and 37th parallels south.

Climate data for Craigie (Bondi Forest Lodge, 1930–1969, rainfall to 2022); 790 m AMSL; 37.15° S, 149.15° E
Month	Jan	Feb	Mar	Apr	May	Jun	Jul	Aug	Sep	Oct	Nov	Dec	Year
Mean daily maximum °C (°F)	23.1 (73.6)	22.7 (72.9)	20.4 (68.7)	15.9 (60.6)	12.6 (54.7)	9.4 (48.9)	8.7 (47.7)	10.2 (50.4)	13.3 (55.9)	16.4 (61.5)	18.6 (65.5)	21.5 (70.7)	16.1 (60.9)
Mean daily minimum °C (°F)	7.3 (45.1)	7.7 (45.9)	6.2 (43.2)	3.0 (37.4)	0.4 (32.7)	−1.2 (29.8)	−2.6 (27.3)	−1.7 (28.9)	0.2 (32.4)	3.0 (37.4)	4.9 (40.8)	6.5 (43.7)	2.8 (37.1)
Average precipitation mm (inches)	73.0 (2.87)	77.4 (3.05)	75.7 (2.98)	77.1 (3.04)	77.6 (3.06)	113.1 (4.45)	79.2 (3.12)	75.5 (2.97)	70.7 (2.78)	83.9 (3.30)	94.8 (3.73)	85.1 (3.35)	988.5 (38.92)
Average precipitation days (≥ 0.2 mm)	8.7	8.4	9.4	9.4	10.4	11.6	10.8	11.5	11.6	12.2	11.7	10.3	126.0
Source: Australian Bureau of Meteorology; Craigie (Bondi Forest Lodge)

== Hayden's Bog ==
The former settlement of Hayden's Bog is now contained within Bendoc. Hayden's Bog State School (No. 2537) operated from 1 January 1878 to 22 April 1941. It was a half-time school for much of its existence, initially shared with Bendoc and then with Bendoc Lower. Hayden's Bog Post Office opened as a receiving office c. 1902, became a post office on 1 July 1927 and closed on 1 November 1930.

== Clarkeville ==
The former gold mining town of Clarkeville is also located within the boundaries of modern Bendoc. Nothing of the settlement survives today. Clarkeville Post Office opened on 1 March 1892 and closed on 1 March 1895.
