= Little Plains River =

Coordinates: 37°00′S 149°06′E

Location
- Country: Australia
- State: New South Wales
- Region: Australian Alps (IBRA), Snowy Mountains
- Local government areas: Snowy Monaro Regional Council

Physical characteristics
- Source confluence: Bendoc River and Queensborough River
  - location: Bendoc Upper, near Delegate
  - elevation: 758 m (2,487 ft)
- Mouth: confluence with the Delegate River
  - location: between Delegate and Bombala
  - elevation: 693 m (2,274 ft)
- Length: 33 km (21 mi)

Basin features
- River system: Snowy River catchment
- Tributaries
  - right: Craigie Bog Creek, Deep Creek (Bombala, New South Wales), Boggy Creek

The Little Plains River, a perennial river of the Snowy River catchment, is located in the Snowy Mountains region of New South Wales, Australia.

== Course and features ==
The Little Plains River is formed by the confluence of the Queensborough River and the Bendoc River near the locality of Bendoc Upper, south-southeast of Delegate. The river flows generally north-northeast and west-northwest, joined by three minor tributaries, before reaching its confluence with the Delegate River near Balgownie, between Delegate and Bombala. The river descends 65 metres (213 ft) over its 33 kilometres (21 mi) course.

== See also ==
- Rivers of New South Wales
- List of rivers of New South Wales (L–Z)
- List of rivers of Australia
