= Bendoc River =

Bendoc Bendock
- Location of the Bendoc River mouth, north of the Black-Allan Line in New South Wales
- Etymology: Believed to be derived from "Ben's Dock"

Location
- Country: Australia
- States: Victoria, New South Wales
- Region: Australian Alps (IBRA), Victorian Alps, Snowy Mountains
- LGAs: East Gippsland, Snowy Monaro

Physical characteristics
- Source: Errinundra Plateau
  - location: near Bendoc, East Gippsland, Victoria
  - coordinates: 37°08′16″S 148°53′50″E
  - elevation: 848 m (2,782 ft)
- Mouth: confluence with Queensborough River to form the Little Plains River
  - location: near Craigie, Snowy Mountains, New South Wales
  - coordinates: 37°07′50″S 149°00′59″E
  - elevation: 756 m (2,480 ft)
- Length: 22 km (14 mi)

Basin features
- River system: Snowy River catchment
- Tributaries
  - left: Bidwell Creek, Snake Gully, Sawpit Creek, Brownlies Creek, Gibraltar Creek (New South Wales), Basin Creek, Tombong Creek
  - right: Hutchinson Creek, Boundary Creek (New South Wales), Riverview Creek, Haydens Bog Creek, Little Plains River, Mother Moores Creek, Bombala River, Slaughter House Creek
- National park: Errinundra NP

The Bendoc River is a perennial river of the Snowy River catchment, in the Alpine regions of the states of Victoria and New South Wales, Australia.

== Course and features ==
The Bendoc River rises within Errinundra National Park on the Errinundra Plateau, approximately 10 kilometres (6.2 mi) south by east of Bendoc, in East Gippsland, Victoria. The river flows generally north northwest, west northeast, southeast, and then northeast, joined by four minor tributaries, before joining with the Queensborough River to form the Little Plains River approximately 7 kilometres (4.3 mi) south southwest of Craigie, north of the Black-Allan Line that forms part of the border between Victoria and New South Wales. The river descends 92 metres (302 ft) over its 22-kilometre (14 mi) course.

== Etymology ==
The name of the river is believed to be derived from a dock that was located on the river in Victoria, adjacent to a pastoral lease held by Benjamin Boyd. The dock was named "Ben's Dock". However, there was a lack of uniformity in the spelling, variously as Bendoc or Bendock, in relation to a mountain, the river, a parish, and the town near the Victoria and New South Wales borders. In 1966, the Shire of Orbost informed the Victorian government that local sentiment wished to retain the spelling Bendoc. The matter was finalised when the decision of the Minister of Lands was published in the Victoria Government Gazette on 29 May 1968, proclaiming the town and river to be spelt Bendoc.

== See also ==
- List of rivers of New South Wales (A–K)
- List of rivers of Australia
- Rivers of New South Wales
