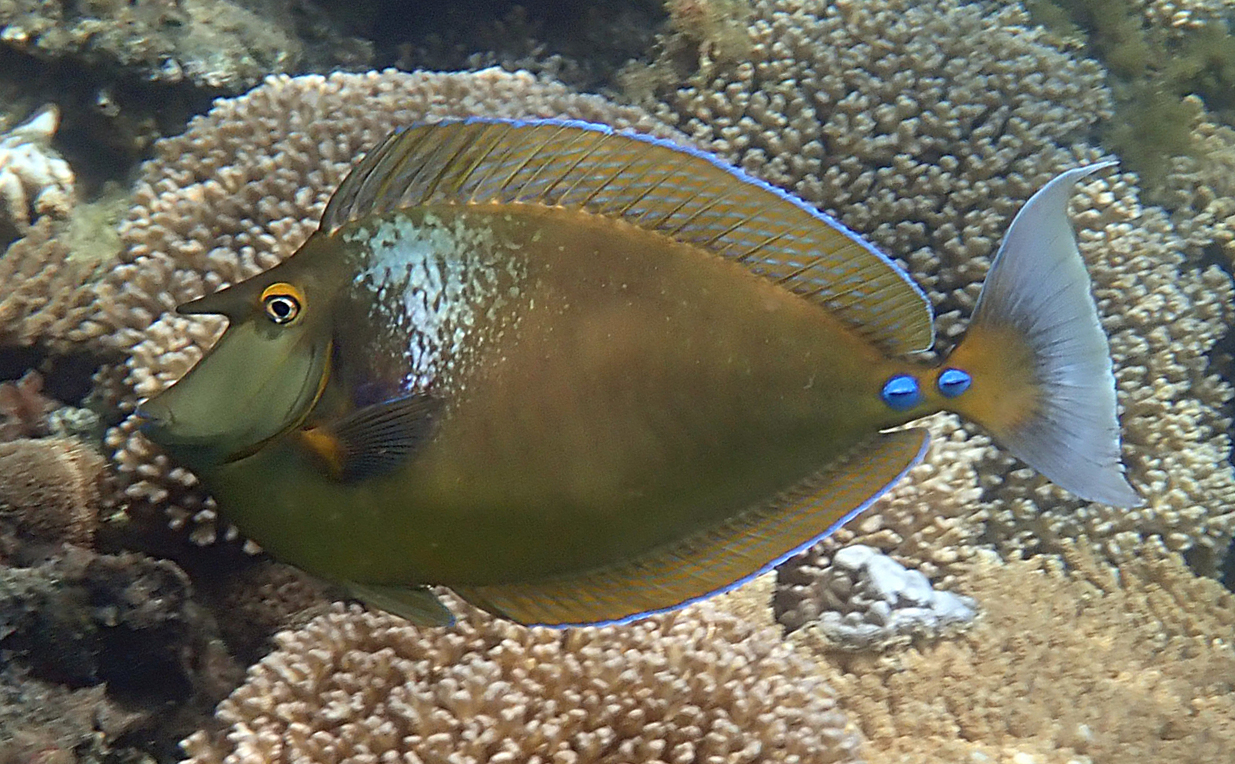
- Off Norfolk Island

Conservation status
- Least Concern (IUCN 3.1)

Scientific classification
- Kingdom: Animalia
- Phylum: Chordata
- Class: Actinopterygii
- Division: Teleostei
- Order: Acanthuriformes
- Family: Acanthuridae
- Genus: Naso
- Subgenus: Naso
- Species: N. unicornis

Binomial name
- Naso unicornis (Forsskål, 1775)

Synonyms
- List: Chaetodon unicornis Forsskål, 1775; Acanthurus unicornis (Forsskål, 1775); Monoceros biaculeatus Bloch & Schneider, 1801; Monoceros rain Bloch & Schneider, 1801; Naso fronticornis Lacépède, 1801; Harpurus monoceros Forster in Lichtenstein, 1844; Acronurus corniger Gronow in Gray, 1854

= Bluespine unicornfish =

Species of fish

The bluespine unicornfish (Naso unicornis), also known as the short-nose unicornfish, is a species of marine ray-finned fish belonging to the family Acanthuridae, the surgeonfishes, unicornfishes and tangs. This species is found in the Indo-Pacific. It is occasionally found in the aquarium trade. It grows to a size of 70 cm in length. It is called kala ('thorn') in Hawaii, dawa in New Caledonia, and ta or tā in Fiji. However the name kala refers to all three species of horned unicornfish found around Hawaii.

== Taxonomy ==
The bluespine unicornfish was first formally described as Chaetodon unicornis by the Swedish-speaking Finnish explorer, orientalist, naturalist, and an apostle of Carl Linnaeus Peter Forsskål with its type locality given as Jeddah. In 1801 the French zoologist Bernard Germain de Lacépède described a new species Naso fronticornis as a replacement name for Chaetodon unicornis, which, in 1917 David Starr Jordan designated as the type species of the genus Naso, which had first been proposed as a genus by Lacépède when he described N. fronticornis. Naso is the only genus in the monogeneric subfamily Nasinae, proposed by Henry Weed Fowler and Barton Appler Bean in 1929 within the family Acanthuridae.

== Description ==
The bluespine unicornfish has a blueish-gray body with two blue spines on each side at the base of the tail and a short rostrum or bony horn on the forehead. In small fish the horn is missing. The species is sexually dimorphic, with males having much larger tail spines than females. Males on average also have slightly longer horns and slightly longer tail streamers than females.

These fish have a leather-like skin instead of scales. The bluespine unicornfish can grow up to 70 cm (28 in) with the largest one caught to be 5.8 kg (13 lb).

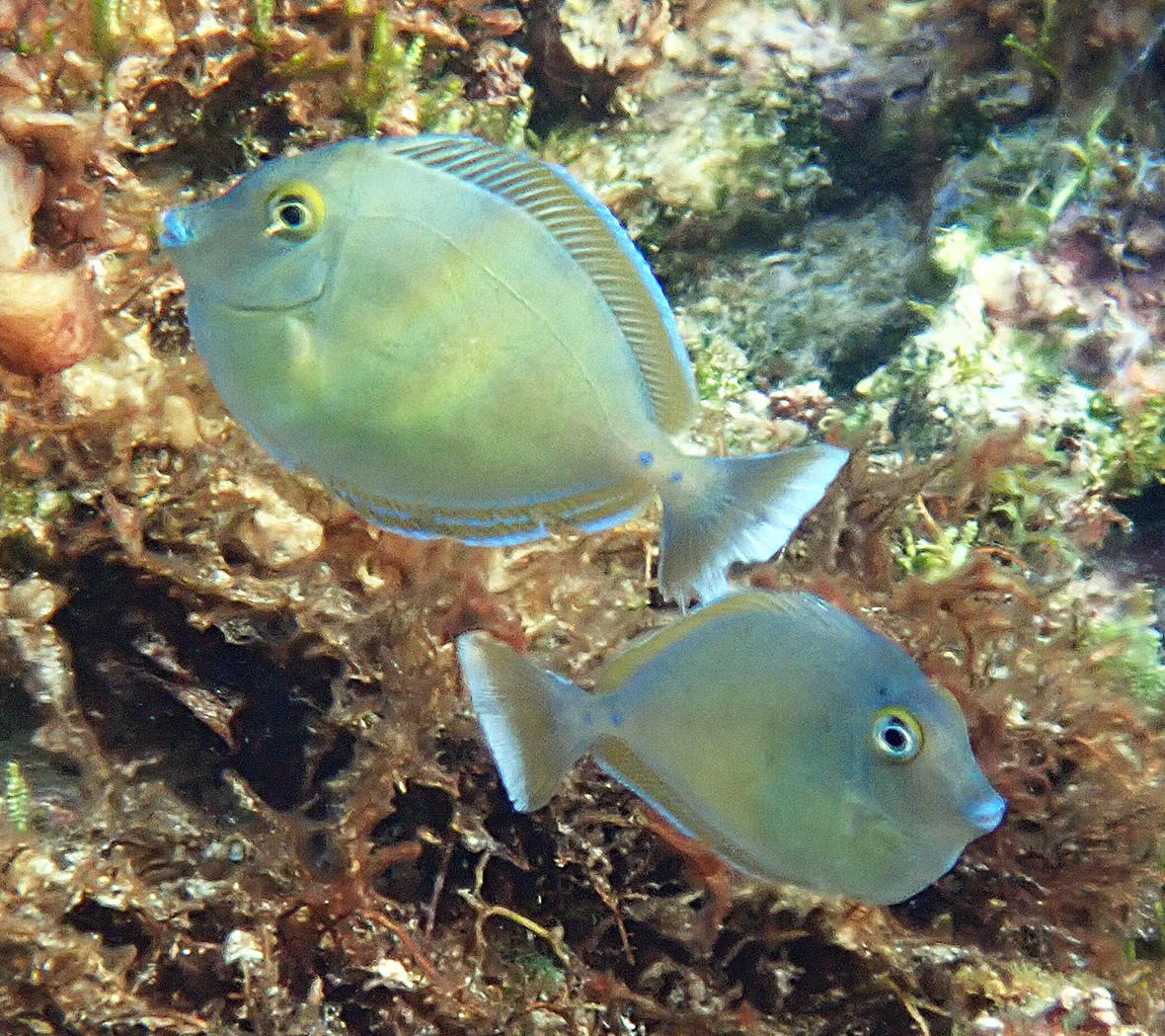
Juveniles

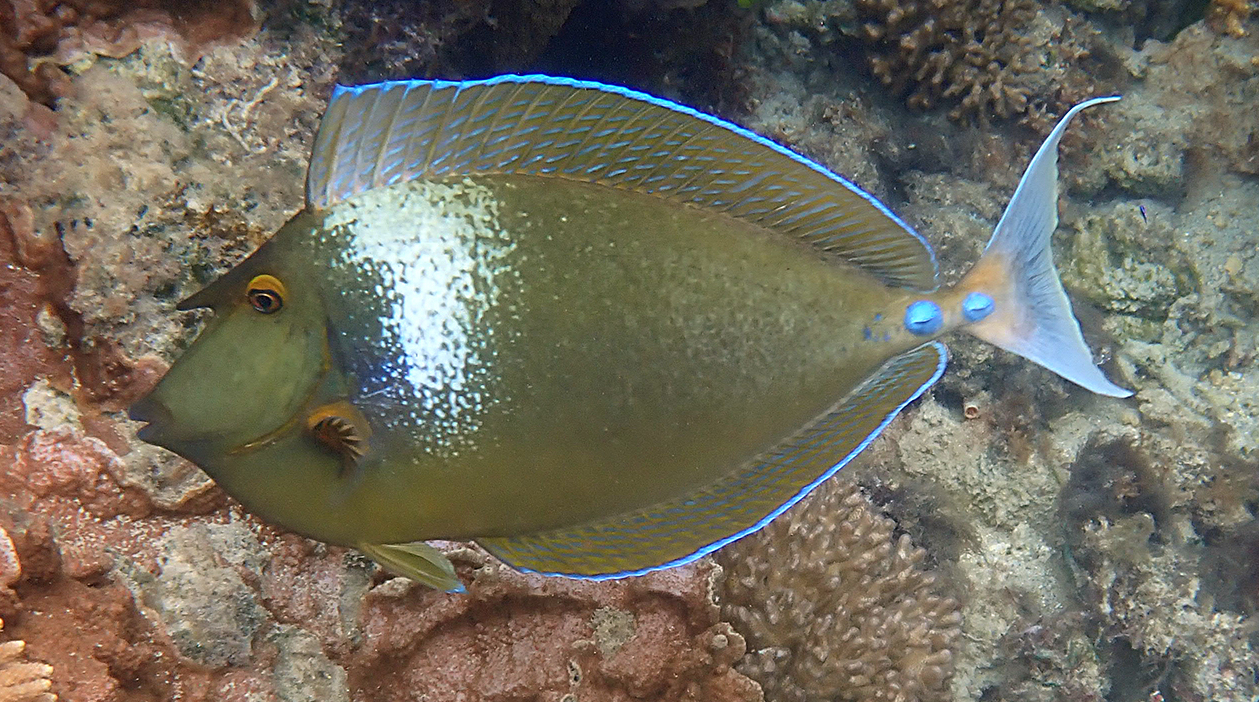
Adult

== Distribution ==
The bluespine unicornfish is very common in the tropical Indo-Pacific region, usually occurring at temperatures between 25 and 29 °C (77 and 84 °F).

== Habitat ==
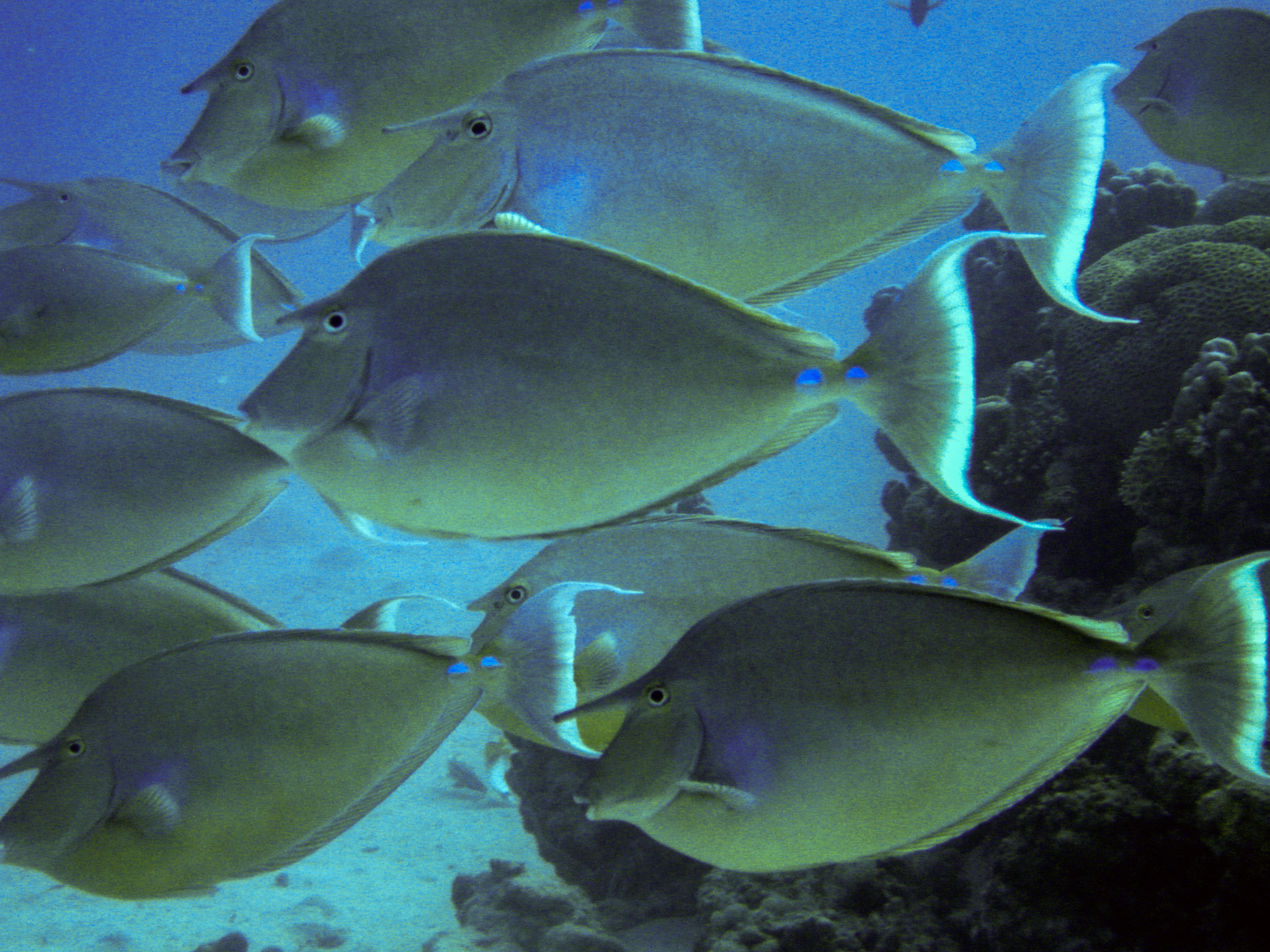
Schooling, in the Red Sea

The bluespine unicornfish are a near-shore fish. The juvenile tend to stay close to shore while the adults tend to live from shallow to the beginnings of the deep water staying within the upper 40 feet.

They tend to enjoy spots with waves or strong surges. The bluespine unicornfish live often solitary on coral reefs or can be found in small schools of unicorn fish or as a part of larger schools with many other fish species.

== Diet ==
Bluespine unicornfish are herbivores and feed on brown and red algae with coarse or leafy blades (such as Sargassum). Because it is one of a small number of species that consumes fleshy macroalgae (seaweed), it is of great importance to coral reef ecosystems.

=== Invasive algae ===
Bluespine unicornfish have been recorded eating invasive algae species, such as Gracilaria salicornia. This alga has become well established in reefs throughout the Hawaiian island of Oahu and is of concern because of its tendency to form dense, overgrown mats on and around corals that prevent nutrient acquisition. G. salicornia reproduces through fragmentation. The bluespine unicornfish feeds on G. salicornia which both helps reduce the size of the alga on reefs but also contributes to its spread as the fragments found in the fishes' feces are viable and can grow into new algal mats.

== Human use ==
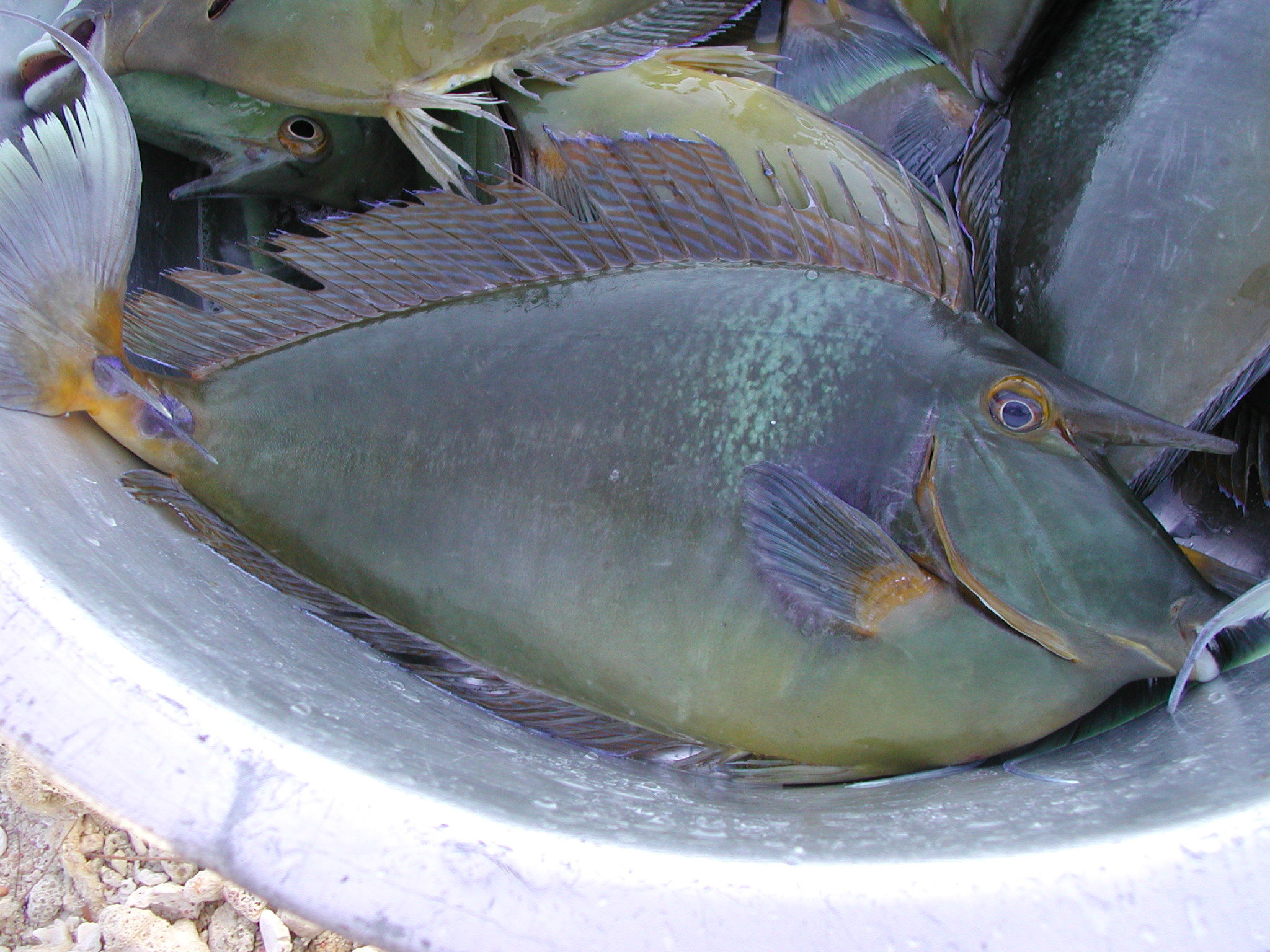
Caught off Rūrutu, French Polynesia

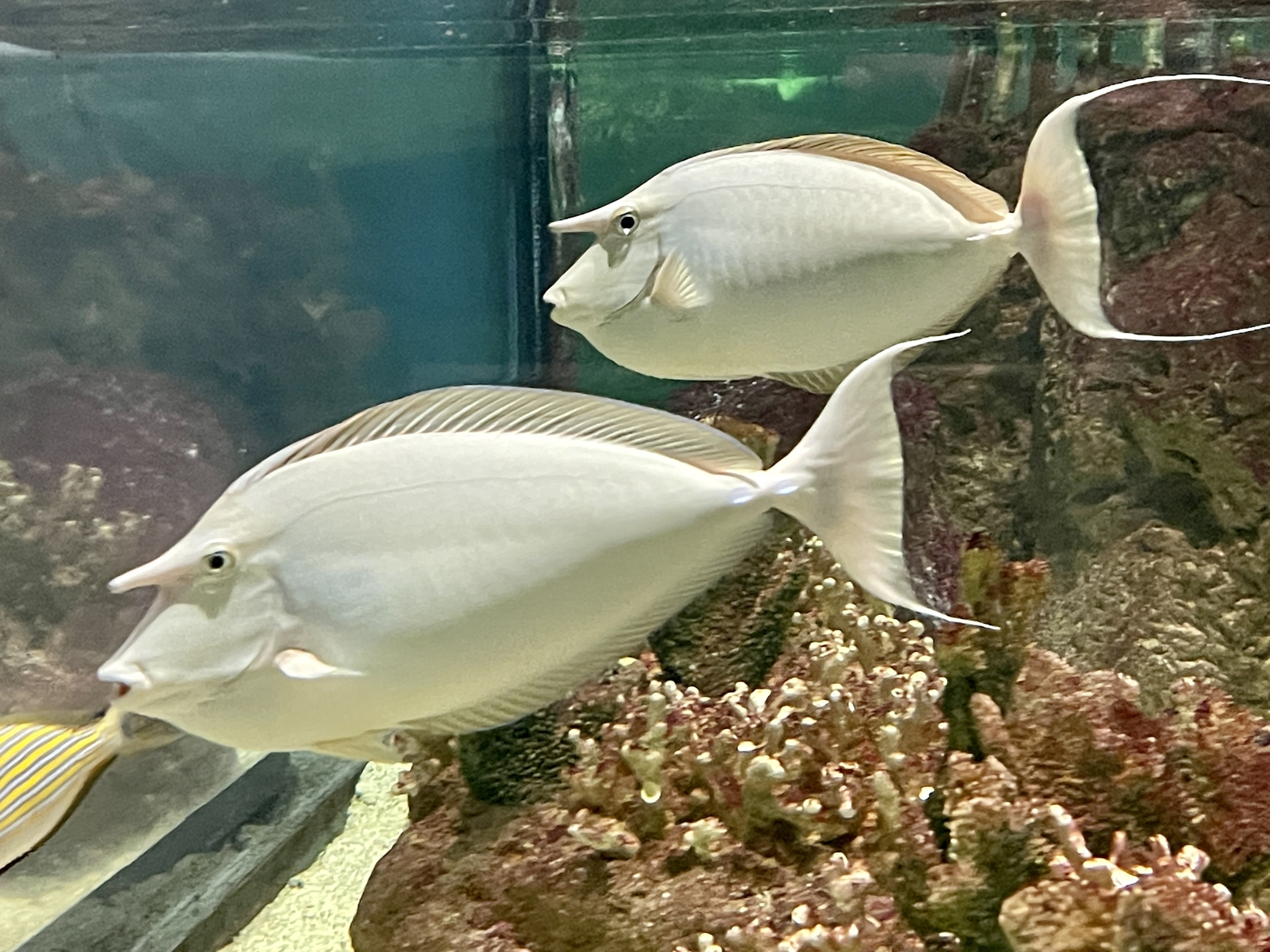
In Moody Gardens, Texas

Bluespine unicornfish are eaten in abundance due to how common they are. They are caught using nets, hook and line techniques, and by nighttime spearfishing. They have a strong flavor and odor due to their diet. When skinned, the meat is white with a slight pink-red taint and a firm or moist texture. Bluespine unicornfish are usually eaten raw, boiled, grilled, baked or sauteed.

The kala, the Hawaiian name for Naso unicornis and two other Naso species, was an important food source in pre-colonial Hawaii. The tough skin of kala was sometimes stretched over a half coconut shell to make a small knee drum. The Hawaiians also used kala in ceremonies between members of a tribe or between tribes. Today kala is still a common food source to the people of Hawaii and other Pacific Islands.

=== Conservation ===
A commercial kala fishing permit is required by the Hawaiian Department of Land and Natural Resources; the daily take of kala is limited to four fish per person per day. As of March 2024 annual catch limit for the commercial kala fishery is 15,000 pounds, with the count beginning on August 1 of each year.

=== Cultural significance ===
The bluespine unicornfish is frequently found on postage stamps, as company logos, school mascots, and as a motif in indigenous artwork.

== Gallery ==
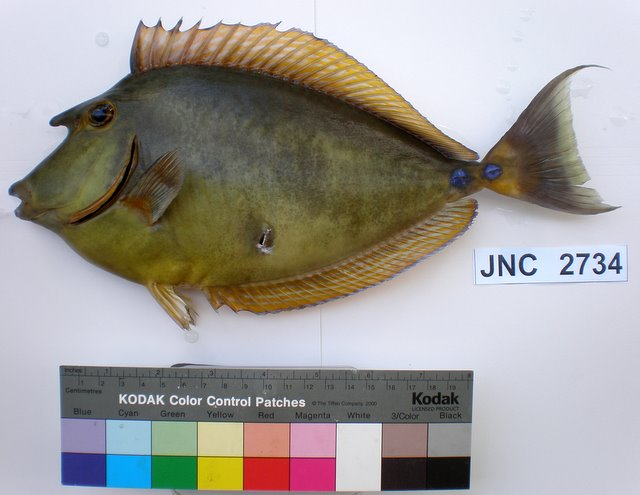
Naso unicornis from New Caledonia

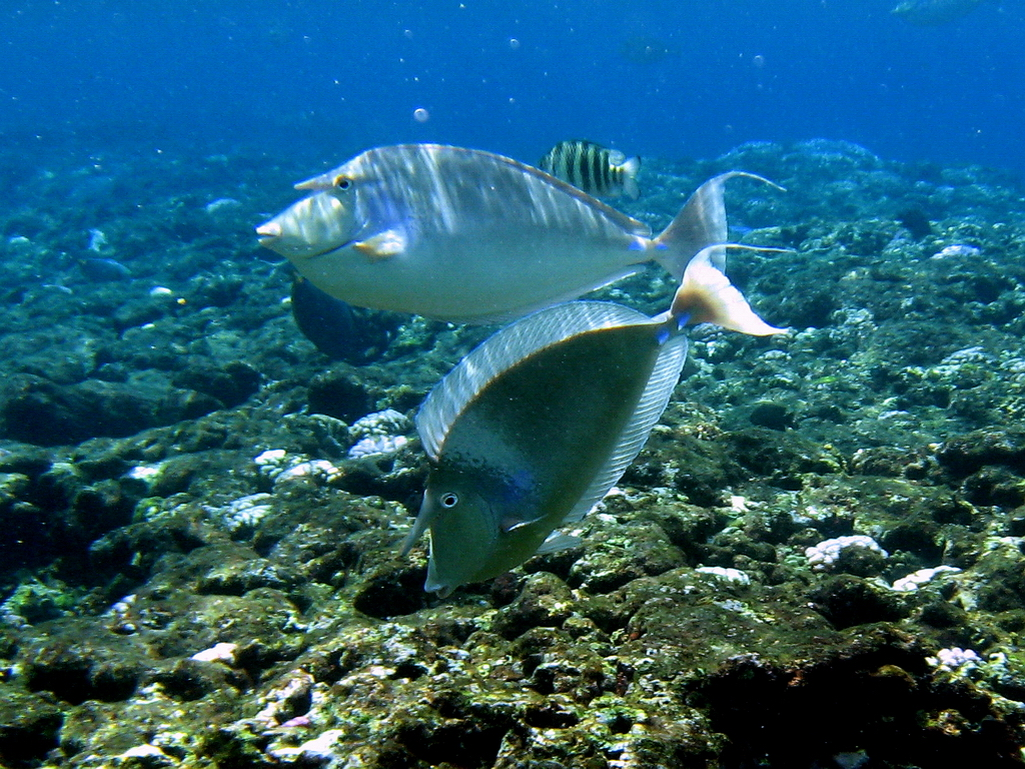
A pair of bluespine unicornfish in a shallow water coral reef area of Green Island, a coral reef ecosystem reserve in Taiwan

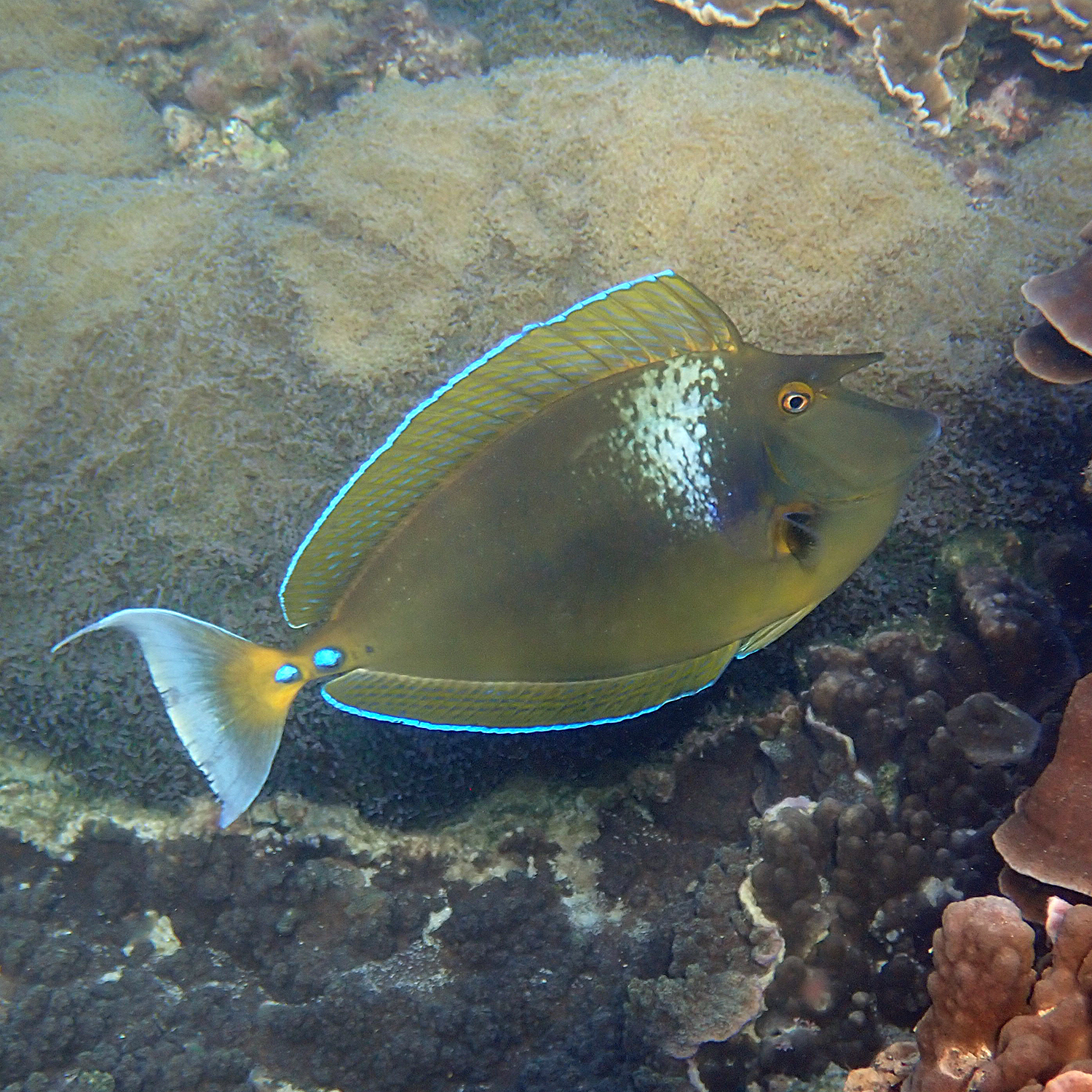
Norfolk Island

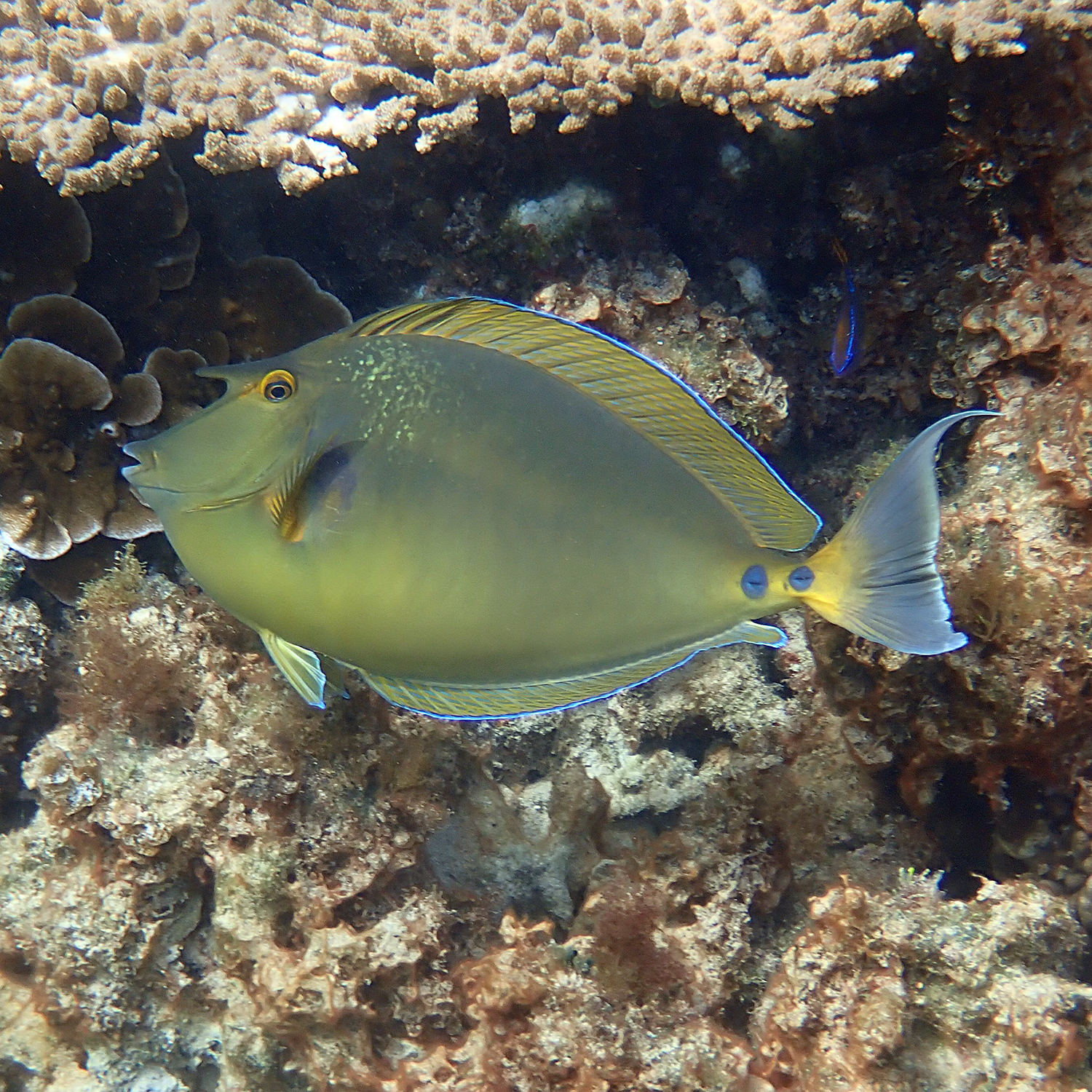
Norfolk Island

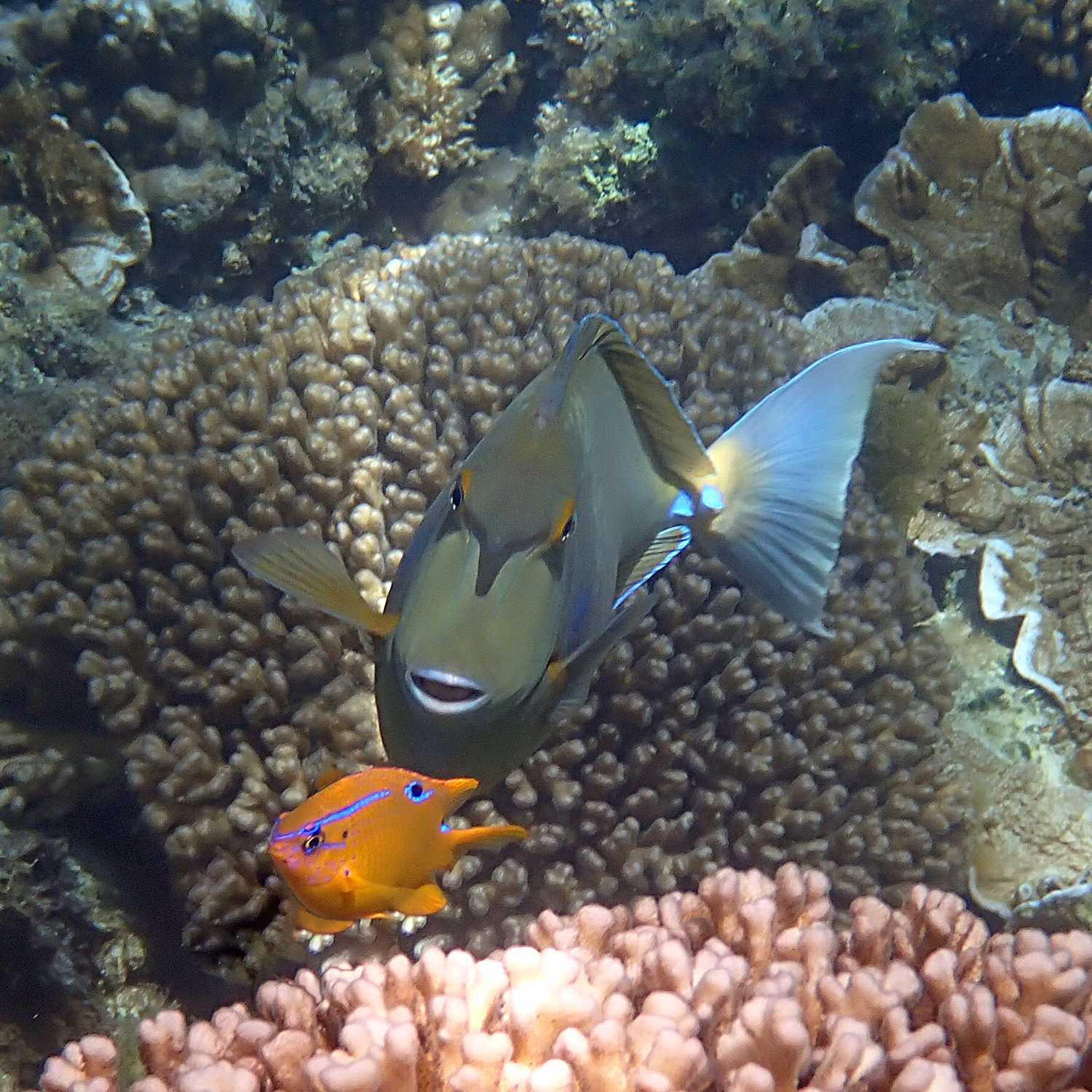
Front view with a multispine damselfish, Norfolk Island

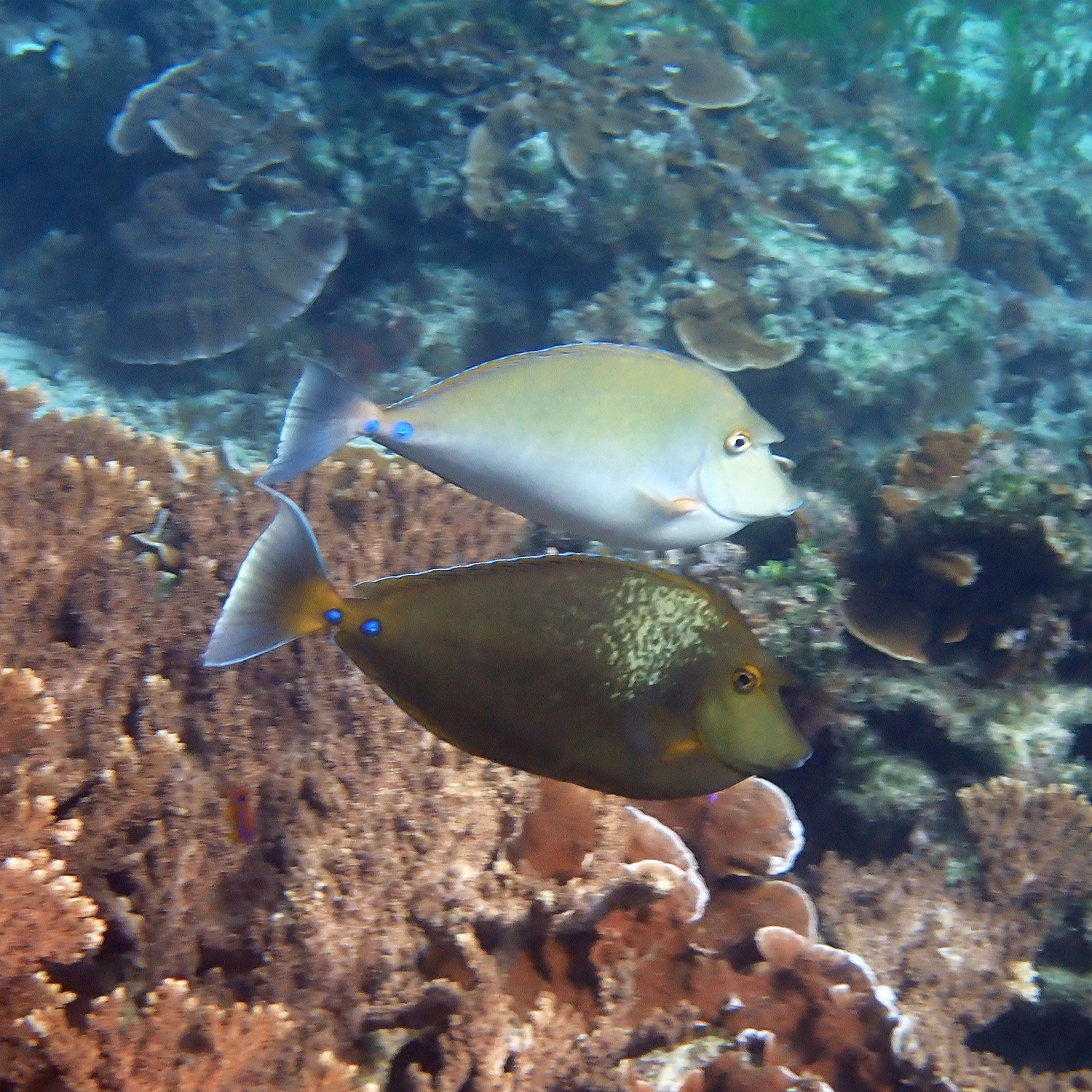
Two differently coloured individuals, Norfolk Island
