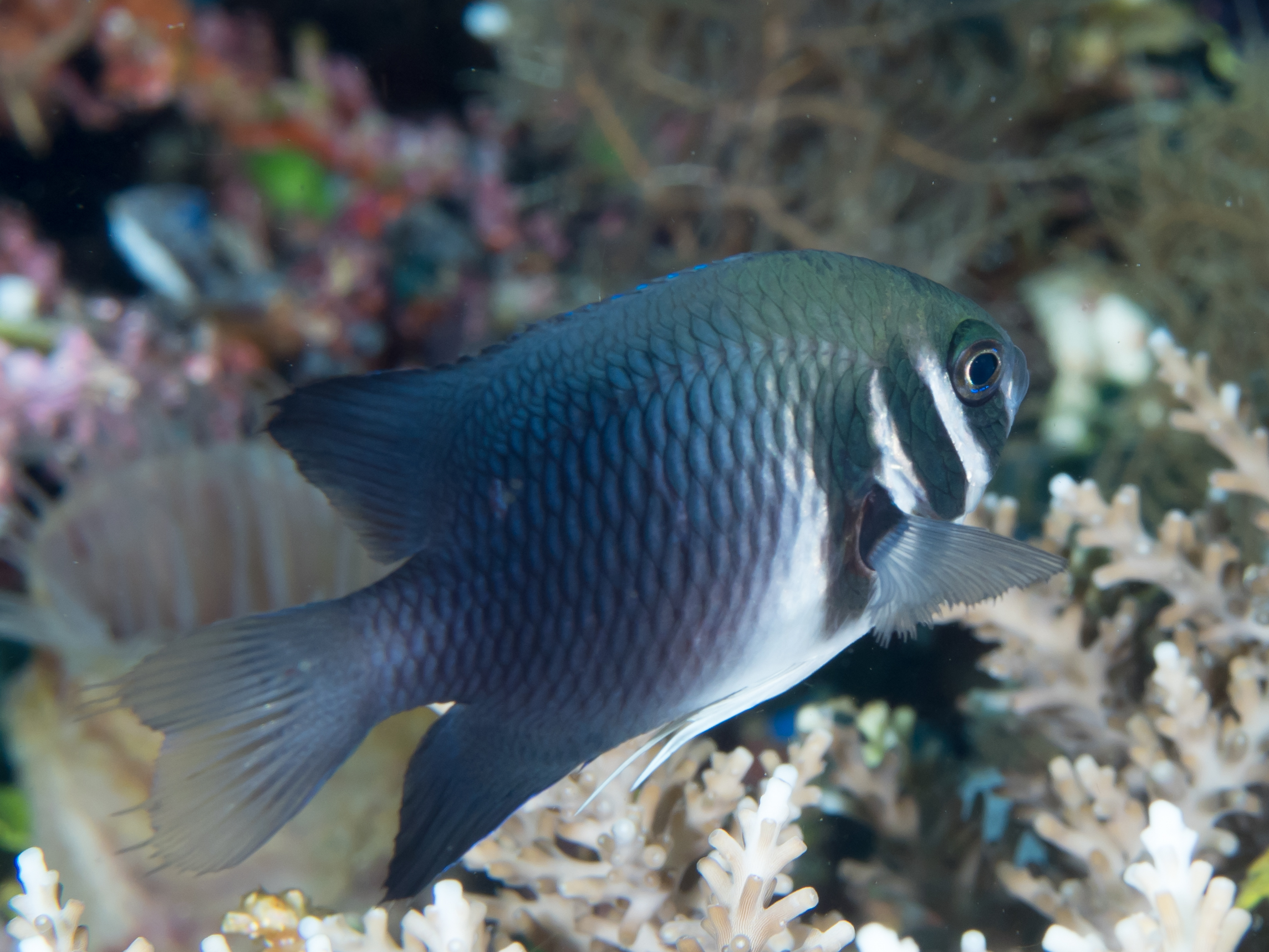

Conservation status
- Least Concern (IUCN 3.1)

Scientific classification
- Kingdom: Animalia
- Phylum: Chordata
- Class: Actinopterygii
- Order: Blenniiformes
- Family: Pomacentridae
- Genus: Neoglyphidodon
- Species: N. thoracotaeniatus

Binomial name
- Neoglyphidodon thoracotaeniatus (Fowler and Bean, 1928)

Synonyms
- Abudefduf thoracotaeniatus Fowler & Bean, 1928; Paraglyphidodon thoracotaeniatus (Fowler & Bean, 1928)

= Neoglyphidodon thoracotaeniatus =

Species of fish

Neoglyphidodon thoracotaeniatus is a species of damselfish in the family Pomacentridae. It is found in the Indo-Pacific mainly in the Pacific Ocean. Adults can grow up to 13.5 centimetres (5.3 in). It is found in the aquarium trade.

== Distribution and habitat ==
This fish is found in the Indo-Pacific mainly in the Pacific Ocean. Populations in the Indian Ocean only occur around Java in Indonesia. The rest of the populations occur in the Pacific Ocean around Indonesia, Australia, Vietnam, the Philippines, Papua New Guinea, and the Solomon Islands. Usually, they are found in coral reefs. It lives around a depth range of 10 to 45 metres (33 to 148 ft).

== Description ==
Adults can grow up to 13.5 centimetres (5.3 in). Its fins have 13 dorsal spines, 12 to 14 dorsal soft rays, 2 anal spines, and 13 to 14 anal soft rays. Like most species of damselfish in the genus Neoglyphidodon, adults and juveniles have different colouration. Adults are black. They have a white area extending from its eye to the pectoral fin in the bottom. They have 3 vertical dark bands in their front. Juveniles have the same pattern but they are yellow. Around their dorsal fin, juveniles have a dark spot. There are turquoise lines around their dark spot and extends to its eyes.

== Ecology ==
=== Diet ===
This fish feeds on plankton.

=== Behaviour ===
Juveniles stay near the substrate while adults stay more above to feed on drifting plankton.

== In the aquarium ==
This fish is found in the aquarium trade.

== Reproduction ==
Females lay their eggs then males protect them.
