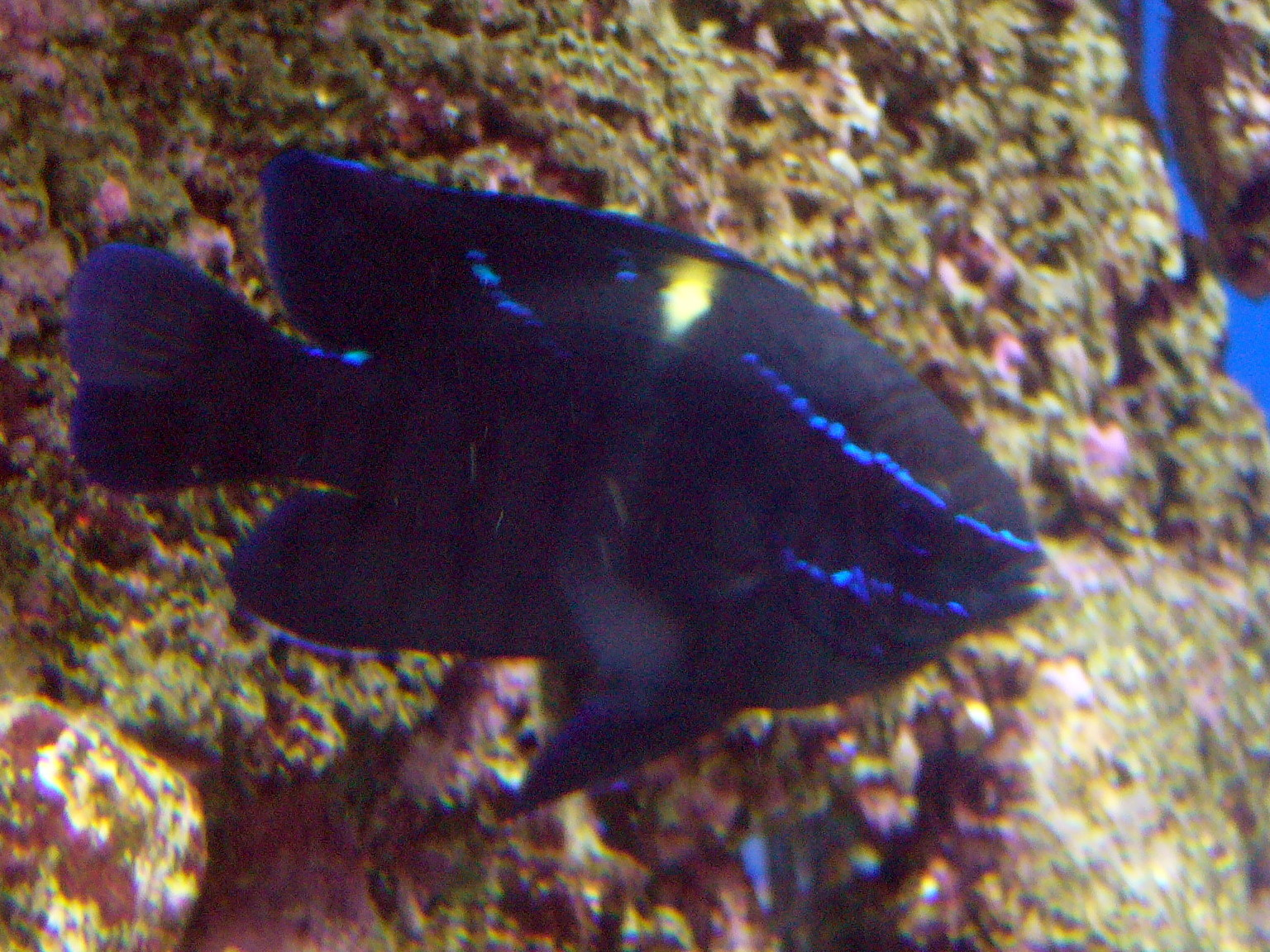

Conservation status
- Least Concern (IUCN 3.1)

Scientific classification
- Kingdom: Animalia
- Phylum: Chordata
- Class: Actinopterygii
- Order: Blenniiformes
- Family: Pomacentridae
- Genus: Neoglyphidodon
- Species: N. oxyodon

Binomial name
- Neoglyphidodon oxyodon (Bleeker, 1830)

Synonyms
- Glyphisodon oxyodon Bleeker, 1858; Paraglyphidodon oxyodon (Bleeker, 1858)

= Neoglyphidodon oxyodon =

Species of fish

Neoglyphidodon oxyodon, the neon velvet damselfish is a species of damselfish in the family Pomacentridae. It is found in the Pacific Ocean. They are found in the aquarium hobby.

== Distribution and habitat ==
This species of fish is found in coral reefs in the western Pacific Ocean. It ranges from Indonesia to the Philippines to the Ashmore Reef in the Timor Sea. The depth range for this species ranges from 0 to 4 metres (0 to 13 ft). They are normally found around Acropora heads for shelter. Lagoons and reef flats are the parts of the reef that this species of fish is found in.

== Description ==
The adults can grow up to a maximum size of 15 centimetres (5.9 in). Juveniles and adults have different coloration. Adults of this species are grayish black. Juveniles are dark blue with a light yellow stripe or spot and blue streaks that fade with age.

== Ecology ==
=== Diet ===
Neoglyphidodon oxyodon is an omnivorous species of damselfish. They feed on zooplankton and filamentous algae.

=== Behavior ===
Like most species of damselfish, this species is territorial. At daytime, they are active. When the diurnal hours are over, they take shelter in corals to avoid getting eaten by predators.

== In the aquarium ==
This species of damselfish is rarely seen in the aquarium hobby. It is due to the fact that it has not been yet bred in the aquarium hobby. Most people consider this the "most expensive species of damselfish". People keep them normally in the average conditions that tropical marine fish are kept in. It often chases other peaceful fishes. It loves to cruise by nature therefore need a vast living space and territory.

== Reproduction ==
Males establish a territory on a rock or coral surface and start clean it. Then, the male will court a female to the territory. Females then lay their eggs and the males fertilize them. After that, the male will constantly guard the eggs until they hatch. The eggs also get aerated and tended for by the male. Eggs that failed to hatch are removed out of the spawning site. The reproduction process usually lasts for about 20 minutes. Females can lay up to 20,000 eggs each. On average, eggs take about 3 days to a week to hatch. Males sometimes spawn with more than 1 female.

== Etymology ==
The common names that are mostly used for this species are bluestreak damselfish, blue-streak damselfish, bluevelvet damselfish, Javanese damselfish, Java damselfish, and bluebanded damselfish.
