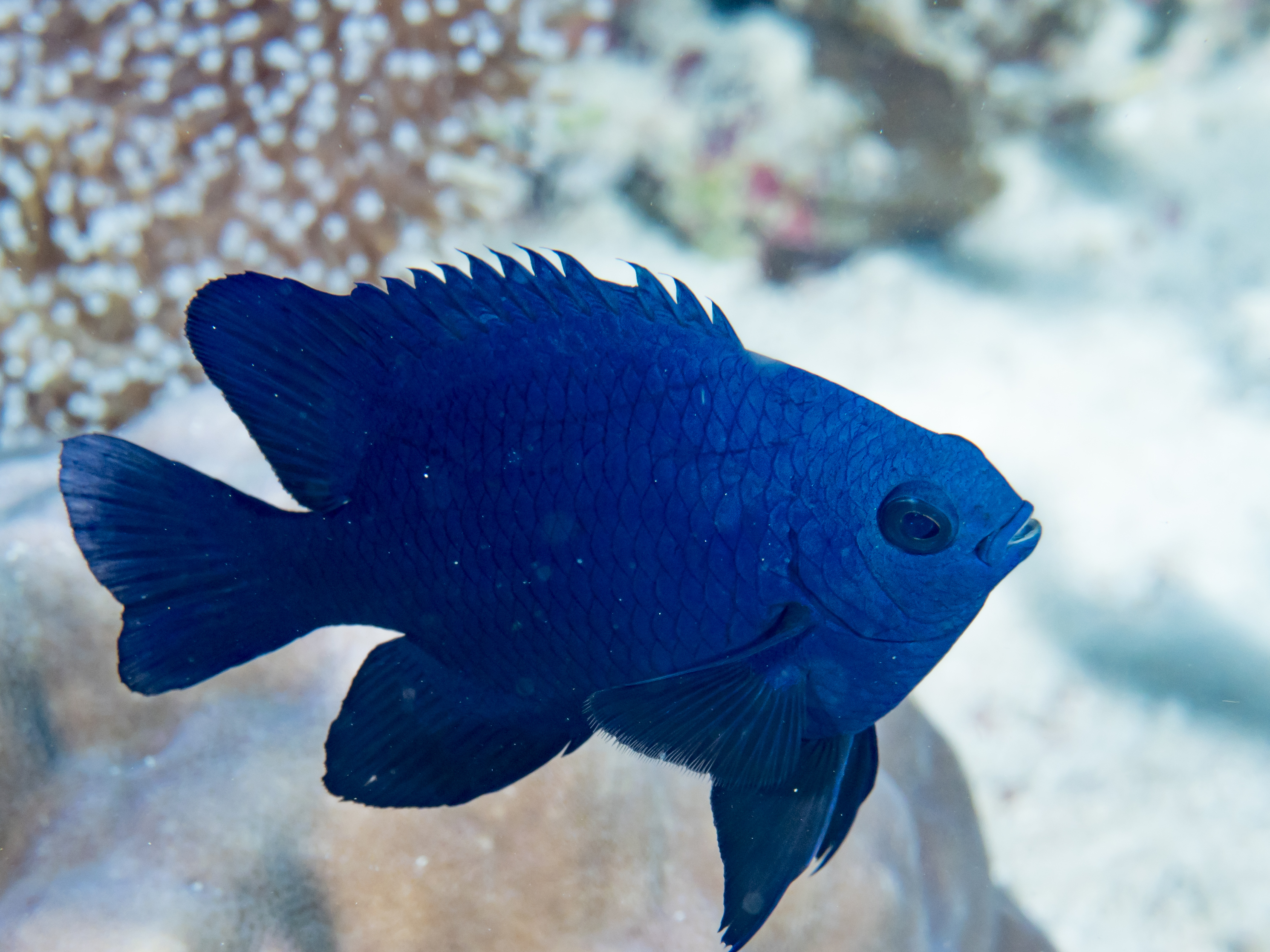

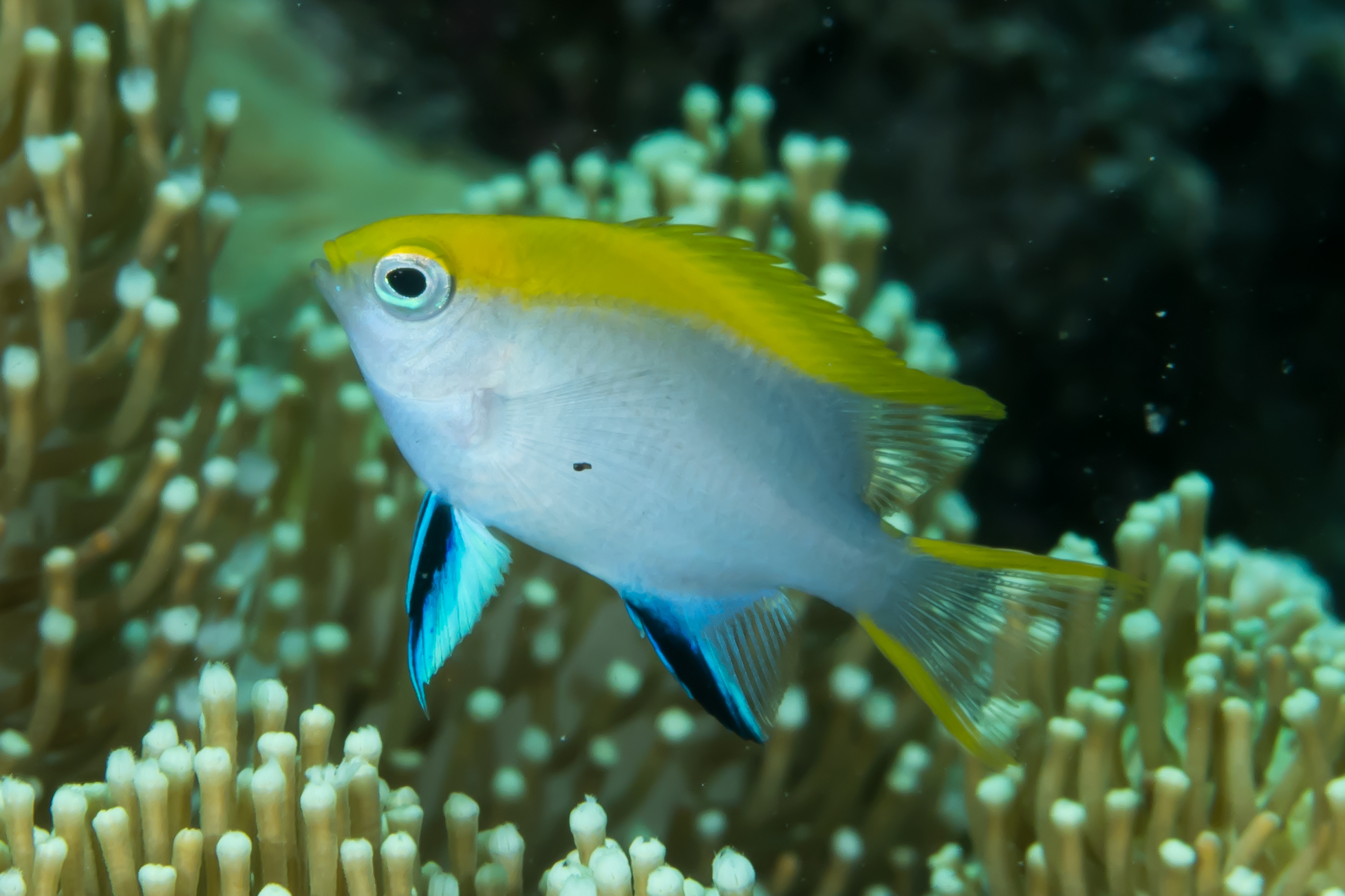
- Adult (top) and juvenile (bottom)

Conservation status
- Least Concern (IUCN 3.1)

Scientific classification
- Kingdom: Animalia
- Phylum: Chordata
- Class: Actinopterygii
- Division: Teleostei
- Order: Blenniiformes
- Family: Pomacentridae
- Genus: Neoglyphidodon
- Species: N. melas

Binomial name
- Neoglyphidodon melas (Cuvier & Valenciennes, 1830)

Synonyms
- List: Glyphisodon melas Cuvier, 1830; Abudefduf melas (Cuvier, 1830); Paraglyphidodon melas (Cuvier, 1830); Glyphisodon ater Cuvier, 1830; Glyphisodon melanopus Bleeker, 1856; Abudefduf melanopus (Bleeker, 1856); Paraglyphidodon melanopus (Bleeker, 1856); Glyphisodon xanthonotus Bleeker, 1859; Abudefduf xanthonotus (Bleeker, 1859); Abudefduf rhomaleus Snyder, 1911

= Neoglyphidodon melas =

Species of fish

Neoglyphidodon melas, known as the bowtie damselfish or black damselfish, is a species of tropical reef fish in the damselfish family Pomacentridae.

== Description ==
Neoglyphidodon melas may be identified by its dark blue-black coloration in adulthood. However, juveniles are pale blue with a yellow stripe across their dorsal surface, and sport yellow-lined caudal fin rays and bright blue anal and pelvic fins with dark outer rays. Neoglyphidodon melas possesses 13 dorsal spines, 13–15 soft dorsal rays, 2 anal spines, and 12–15 soft anal rays. The body is laterally compressed, allowing this species to navigate through tight crevices in coral reefs, while their long pectoral fins further aiding in maneuverability and agility. Neoglyphidodon melas may grow to 11.8–18 cm and reach 100 g at maturity.

== Similar species ==
Neoglyphidodon melas may be confused with fellow damselfish Chrysiptera brownriggii (commonly known as the surge damselfish), since both inhabit shallow lagoons and coral reefs, and have small, compressed body plans with blue and yellow stripes at some point in their lives. However, it is easy to distinguish the two species if we look closer: Chrysiptera brownriggii has a yellow body with a blue dorsal surface, while the juvenile Neoglyphidodon melas has a yellow dorsal surface and light blue body.

== Distribution and habitat ==
Neoglyphidodon melas may be found throughout the Indo-Pacific region, with sightings in the Red Sea, East Africa, the Indo-Malayan archipelago, the Ryukyu Islands, China, the Philippines, Palau, New Guinea, the Solomon Islands, Vanuatu and northern Australia.

Within these seas, this species is found in coralline, rocky lagoons, as well as marine reefs that contain soft corals, which constitute the majority of their diets. It is most commonly found between depths of 1–12 m.

== Life history ==
=== Mating ===
This species creates unique pairings during mating, although the timing of such events has not been observed. After forming a pair, the female bowtie damselfish lays her eggs, adhering them with a sticky substance to a flat reef surface such as a ledge, rock or a shell. After this, the female departs, and the male stays to defend the eggs from predation. During this time, the male frequently aerates the eggs with his fins until hatching occurs, typically 3–7 days after fertilization.

=== Larval stage ===
After hatching, the larval Neoglyphidodon melas spends time in a planktonic stage, during which it floats in the water column, consuming other plankton while they grow. The exact planktonic period of larval Neoglyphidodon melas is currently unknown.

=== Lifespan ===
The natural lifespan of wild Neoglyphidodon melas is currently unknown, although their captive lives range from 2–3 years.

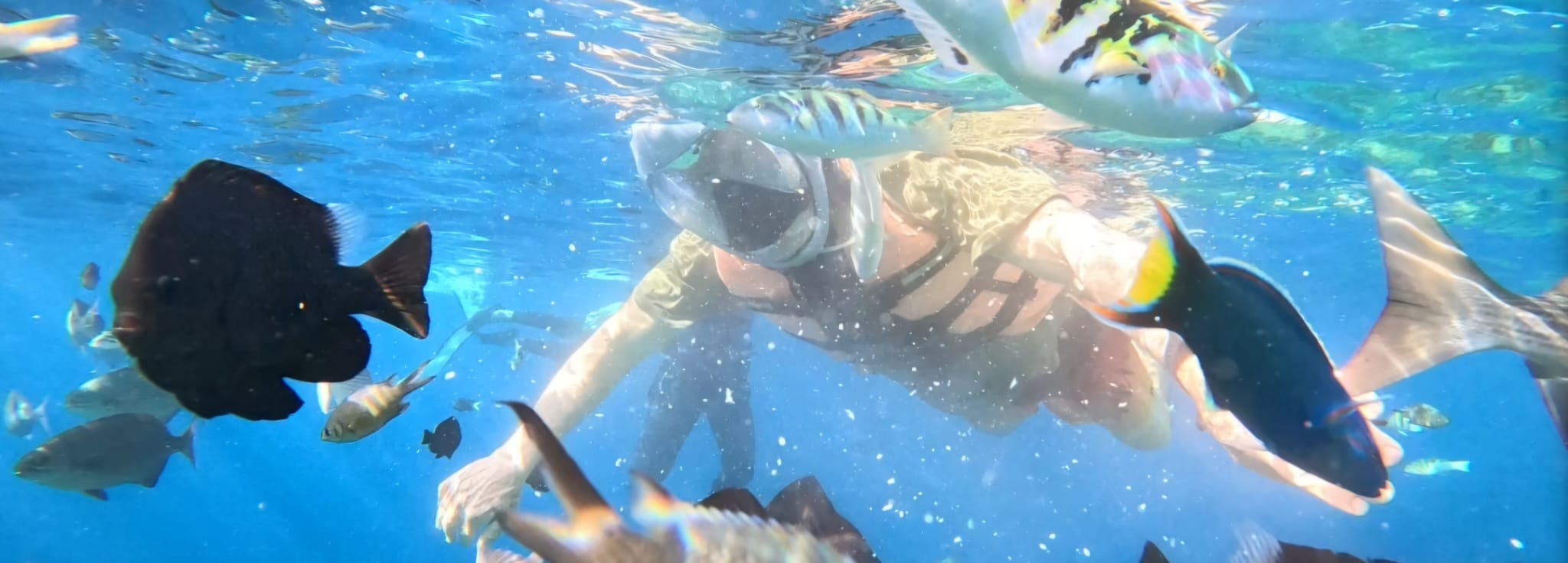
Black Damselfish with Thalassoma

== Ecology ==
=== Diet ===
Bowtie damselfish are coprophagous organisms, as the adults feed on the nutrient rich feces of the giant clams, Tridacna gigas. Larval bowtie damselfish feed solely on plankton, and are found living around the stalks of Acropora corals, potentially for protection and access to passing food. Juvenile bowtie damselfish feed mainly on soft corals, which constitutes 87% of their preferred diet. Once the fish reaches full maturation it will find a giant Tridacna clam of its own to live near, consuming its excrement in addition to its soft coral diet. As age and size of the adult bowtie damselfish increase, so does its consumption of Tridacna clam waste. The feces of the giant Tridacna clam provides essential proteins for the adult bowtie damselfish, and increases its chance of survival and reproduction. Adult bowtie damselfish lacking a residential giant clam display higher signs of aggression towards other fish than those with their own Tridacna clam, likely due to food instability. Competition between bowtie damselfish increases with resource scarcity, and fish near clams are more likely to grow larger and find mates.

=== Predators ===
Bowtie damselfish are an important prey organism of many higher trophic level fish, including the coral grouper (Plectropomus leopardus), which is important to the local fishing industries of the Indo West Pacific.

=== Disease ===
Bowtie damselfish in the Red Sea are susceptible to infection from the bacteria Tenacibaculum maritimus. Their vulnerability to such bacterial infection may be exacerbated by stress from high levels of catch due to overfishing in the area, or indoor rearing. Symptoms of infection by this bacteria in Neoglyphidodon melas may present as anorexia, erratic swimming, hemorrhagic skin, oral ulcers and fin rot, and mortality rates reach 60% as a result of infection. In the past, outbreaks of this bacteria have led to collapses in important fish cultures from Japan to North America.

== Conservation ==
=== Bycatch stress ===
Neoglyphidodon melas has become a key recreational species on the Seribu Islands, where they are commonly caught as bycatch in fishing pots. Locals prefer larger and more profitable species in the area such as groupers, but this species is often caught as well. Due to their small size, only the large adults are edible. Any Neoglyphidodon melas under this edible limit are either returned from docks post-catch, or discarded posthumously. Individuals released after bycatch have a high risk of mortality due to prolonged air-exposure, improper handling, and relocation to unsuitable habitats. As seen in locations like the Red Sea, stress from catch may leave the bowtie damselfish vulnerable for infections such as the case with T. maritimus. In areas with high bycatch due to overfishing and a lack of escape vents in fishing pots, there have been reduced egg yields and general population declines in local bowtie damselfish populations. N. melas does not have a designated fishery anywhere in the world, nor does it directly support any existing industry.

=== Anthropogenic sound ===
In areas of high human activity and marine industry, the reaction speeds and response distances of Neoglyphidodon melas have been observed to be impacted by the underwater noises caused by aquaculture and boats. This may imply a reduced survival rate and higher susceptibility to predation for the species as marine industry expands in densely populated areas. Despite these challenges the bowtie damselfish remains a species of least concern according to the IUCN. New infections in N. melas and the increased rate of catch and sound stress in some areas of the Indo West Pacific may indicate a troubled future for the fish.

=== Coral die-off ===
Acropora corals are known for their ability to build essential, intricate, three-dimensional coral reefs, and are one of the most diverse and important corals in global reef systems. Larval and juvenile bowtie damselfish rely on Acropora corals for survival, as the tall structures provide protection and access to food. Due to climate change, Acropora have begun to disappear across the globe, being one of the most vulnerable corals to climate stressors. The disappearance of their essential food and habitat access could pose detrimental threats to this species.
