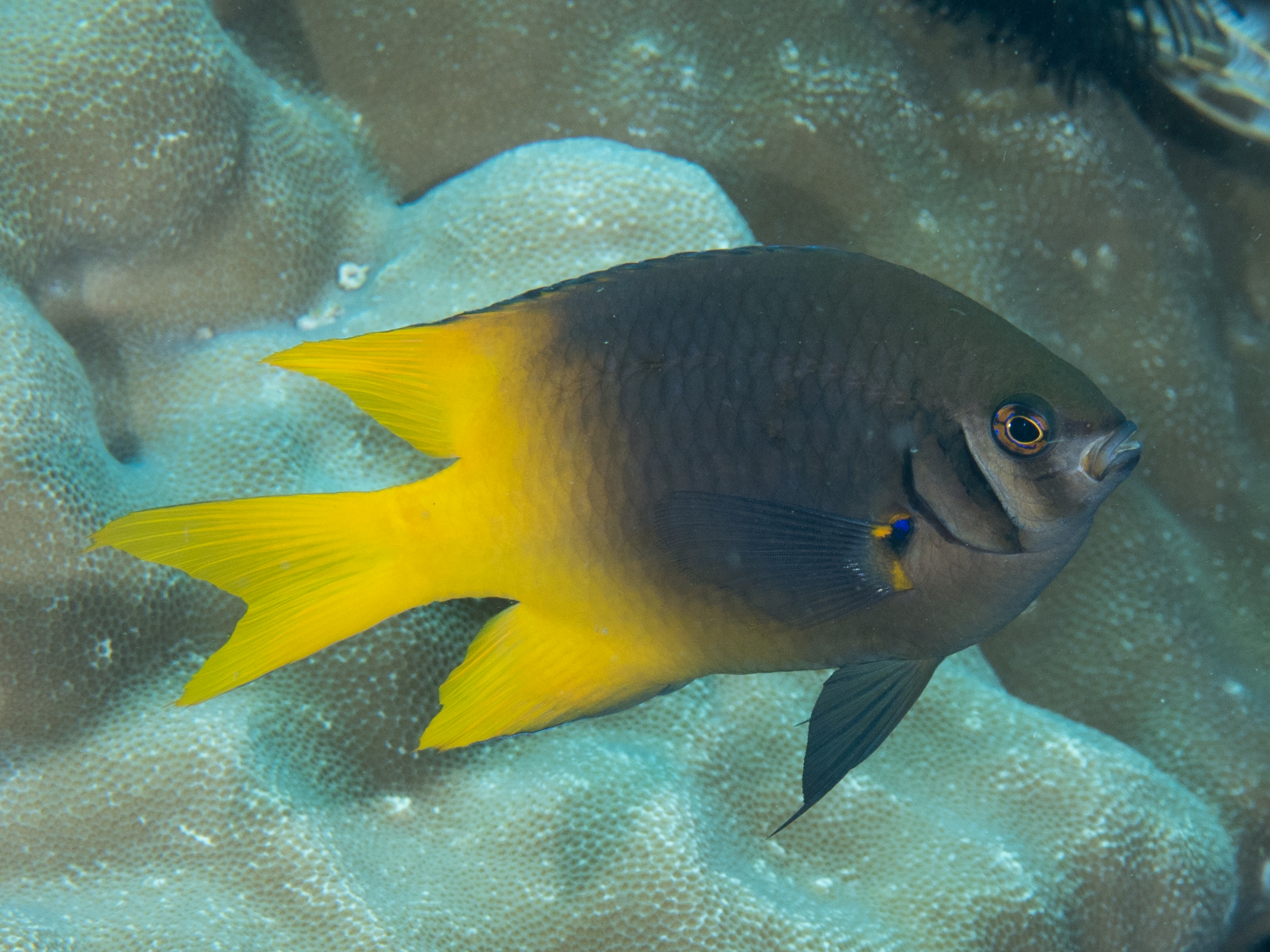

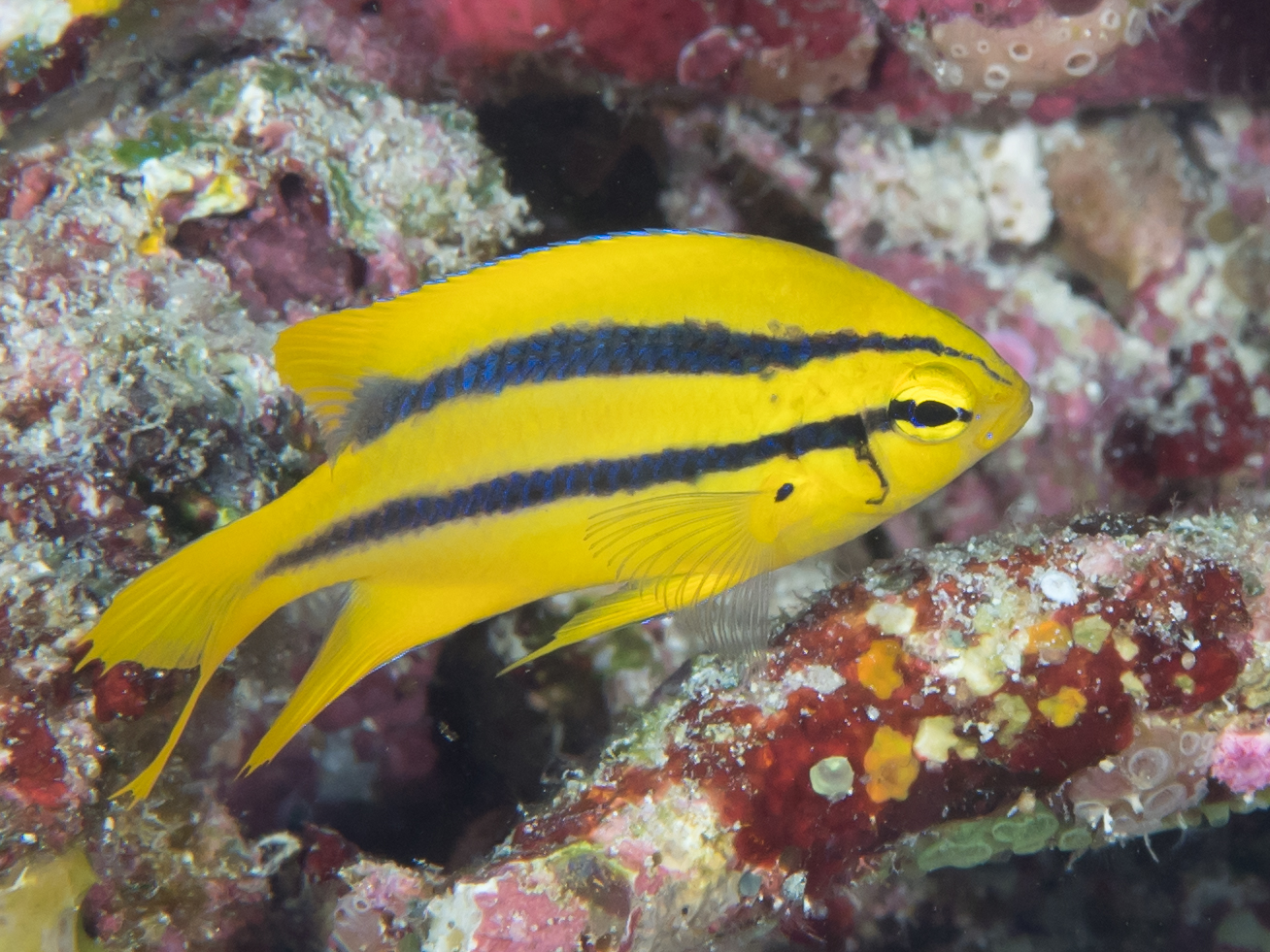
- Adult of the second variety (top) and juvenile (bottom)

Conservation status
- Least Concern (IUCN 3.1)

Scientific classification
- Kingdom: Animalia
- Phylum: Chordata
- Class: Actinopterygii
- Order: Blenniiformes
- Family: Pomacentridae
- Genus: Neoglyphidodon
- Species: N. nigroris

Binomial name
- Neoglyphidodon nigroris (Cuvier, 1830)

Synonyms
- Abudefduf coracinus Seale, 1910; Abudefduf filifer Weber, 1913; Chromis bitaeniatus Fowler & Bean, 1928; Chrysiptera xanthura xanthura Bleeker, 1853; Glyphisodon behnii Bleeker, 1847; Glyphisodon nigroris Cuvier, 1830; Glyphisodon xanthurus Bleeker, 1853; Paraglyphidodon behnii (Bleeker, 1847); Paraglyphidodon nigroris (Cuvier, 1830)

= Neoglyphidodon nigroris =

Species of fish

Neoglyphidodon nigroris, commonly known as the black-and-gold chromis or Behn's damsel, is a species of damselfish found in the Indo-West Pacific. It occasionally makes its way into the aquarium trade.

== Distribution and habitat ==
This species of damselfish is found throughout the Indo-Pacific region. In the Indian Ocean, it is found around Sri Lanka, the Andaman Sea, Indonesia, and Australia. In the Pacific Ocean, it is found around Indonesia, the Philippines, Australia, Vietnam, Japan, Malaysia, the Solomon Islands, Vanuatu, and Hawaii. It lives in coral reefs and lagoons rich in corals, and is found at depths of 2–21 m (6.6–68.9 ft).

== Description ==
Adults can grow up to 13 cm (5.1 in) in total length. There are two coloration varieties in adults: individuals ranging from the Andaman Sea to Japan are black, while individuals from the western Pacific Ocean have a tan front and a yellow rear. The latter variety may deserve species status under the name N. xanthurus, and the two varieties overlap around the island of Bali. Juveniles are yellow with 2 longitudinal black stripes and a black spot at the pectoral-fin base.

== Ecology ==
=== Diet ===
This species is omnivorous, feeding mainly on algae, crustaceans, tunicates, and salps.

=== Behavior ===
This species is diurnal and normally solitary. It is also territorial, a trait that becomes more and more apparent as the fish gets older.

== Reproduction ==
During breeding, the female lays her eggs (which are demersal) on substrate. The male then guards them and aerates them until they hatch.

== In the aquarium ==
Juveniles are occasionally available for the aquarium trade. Most people keep this fish in water conditions of 1.020 to 1.025 gravity, pH 8.1 to 8.4, and 22–25 °C (72–77 °F). It chases smaller fishes and hides in crevices in order to avoid bigger fishes.
