= Delegate River =

Delegate Delegete, Delegate River East Branch, Delegate River West Branch
- Mouth of the Delegate River in New South Wales

Location
- Country: Australia
- States: Victoria, New South Wales
- Region: Australian Alps (IBRA), Victorian Alps, Snowy Mountains
- LGAs: East Gippsland, Snowy Monaro

Physical characteristics
- Source: Gunmark Range, Errinundra Plateau
  - location: near Goongerah, East Gippsland, Victoria
  - coordinates: 37°07′56″S 148°46′37″E
  - elevation: 1,150 m (3,770 ft)
- Mouth: confluence with the Snowy River
  - location: Delegate, Snowy Mountains, New South Wales
  - coordinates: 35°46′S 148°21′E
- Length: 127 km (79 mi)

Basin features
- River system: Snowy River
- Tributaries
  - left: Bidwell Creek, Snake Gully, Sawpit Creek, Brownlies Creek, Gibraltar Creek (New South Wales), Basin Creek, Tombong Creek
  - right: Hutchinson Creek, Boundary Creek (New South Wales), Riverview Creek, Haydens Bog Creek, Little Plains River, Mother Moores Creek, Bombala River, Slaughter House Creek
- National parks: Errinundra NP, Kosciuszko NP

The Delegate River is a perennial river of the Snowy River catchment, in the Alpine regions of the states of Victoria and New South Wales, Australia.

== Course and features ==
The Delegate River rises below Cob Hill within Errinundra National Park on the northwestern slopes of Gunmark Range, part of the Errinundra Plateau, approximately 13 kilometres (8.1 mi) east-northeast of Goongerah, in East Gippsland, Victoria. The river flows generally north, east-southeast, northeast, north, and then northwest, flowing across part of the boundary between New South Wales and Victoria, joined by sixteen tributaries including the Little Plains River and the Bombala River, before reaching its confluence with the Snowy River, 9 kilometres (5.6 mi) north northeast of Tombong, north of the town of Delegate and west northwest of the town of Bombala. The river descends 643 metres (2,110 ft) over its 127-kilometre (79 mi) course.

== See also ==
- Delegate River Diversion Tunnel
- List of rivers of New South Wales (A–K)
- List of rivers of Australia
- Rivers of New South Wales
