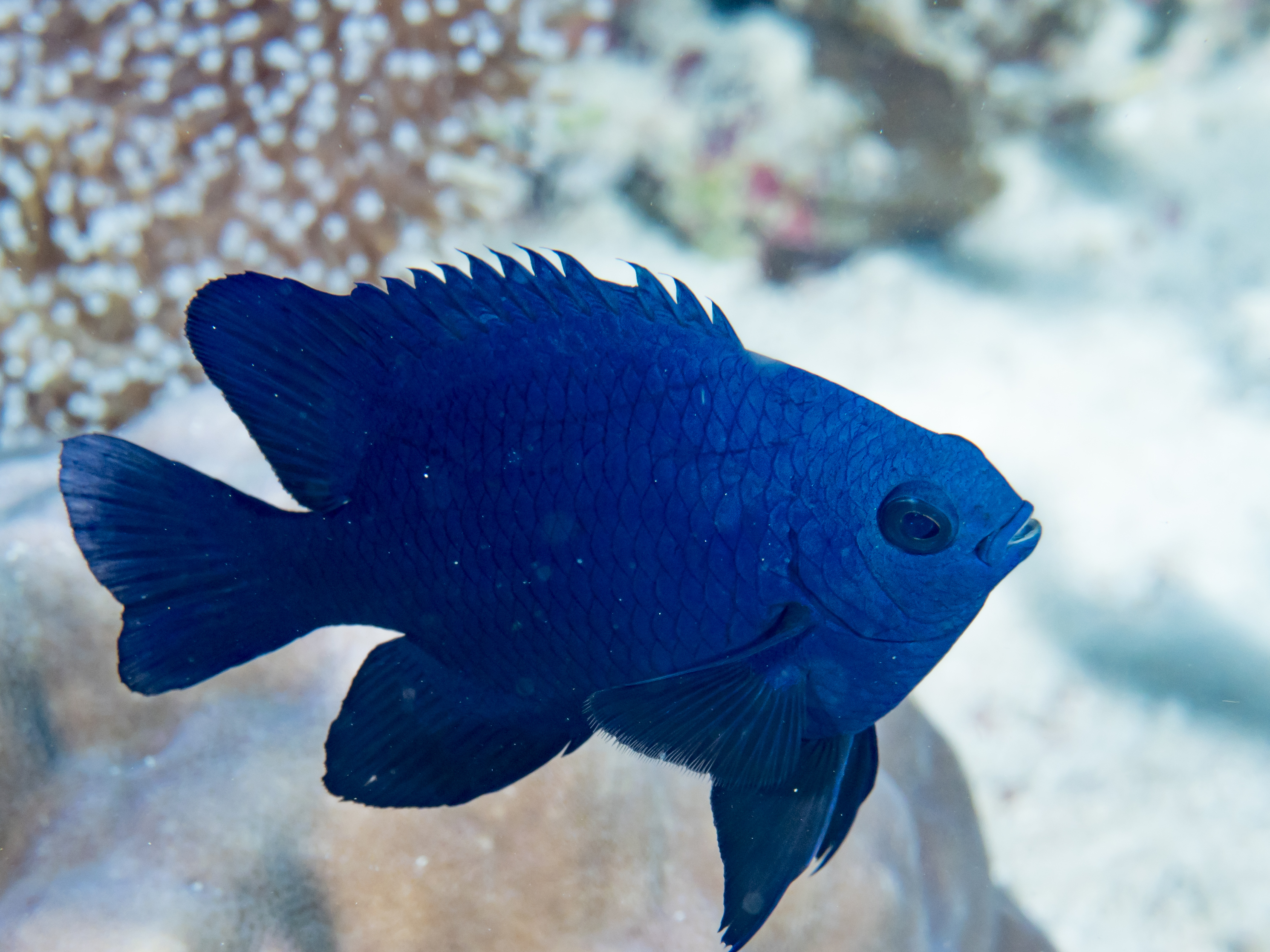
- Neoglyphidodon melas

Scientific classification
- Kingdom: Animalia
- Phylum: Chordata
- Class: Actinopterygii
- Order: Blenniiformes
- Family: Pomacentridae
- Subfamily: Pomacentrinae
- Genus: Neoglyphidodon; Allen, 1991

Type species
- Glyphisodon melas Valenciennes, 1830

= Neoglyphidodon =

Genus of fishes

Neoglyphidodon is a genus of fish in the family Pomacentridae.

== Species ==
Image	Species
	Neoglyphidodon bonang (Bleeker, 1852)
	Neoglyphidodon carlsoni (Allen, 1975)
	Neoglyphidodon crossi (Allen, 1991)
	Neoglyphidodon melas (Cuvier and Valenciennes, 1830)
	Neoglyphidodon nigroris (Cuvier and Valenciennes, 1830)
	Neoglyphidodon oxyodon (Bleeker, 1858)
	Neoglyphidodon polyacanthus (Ogilby, 1889)
	Neoglyphidodon thoracotaeniatus (Fowler and Bean, 1928)
