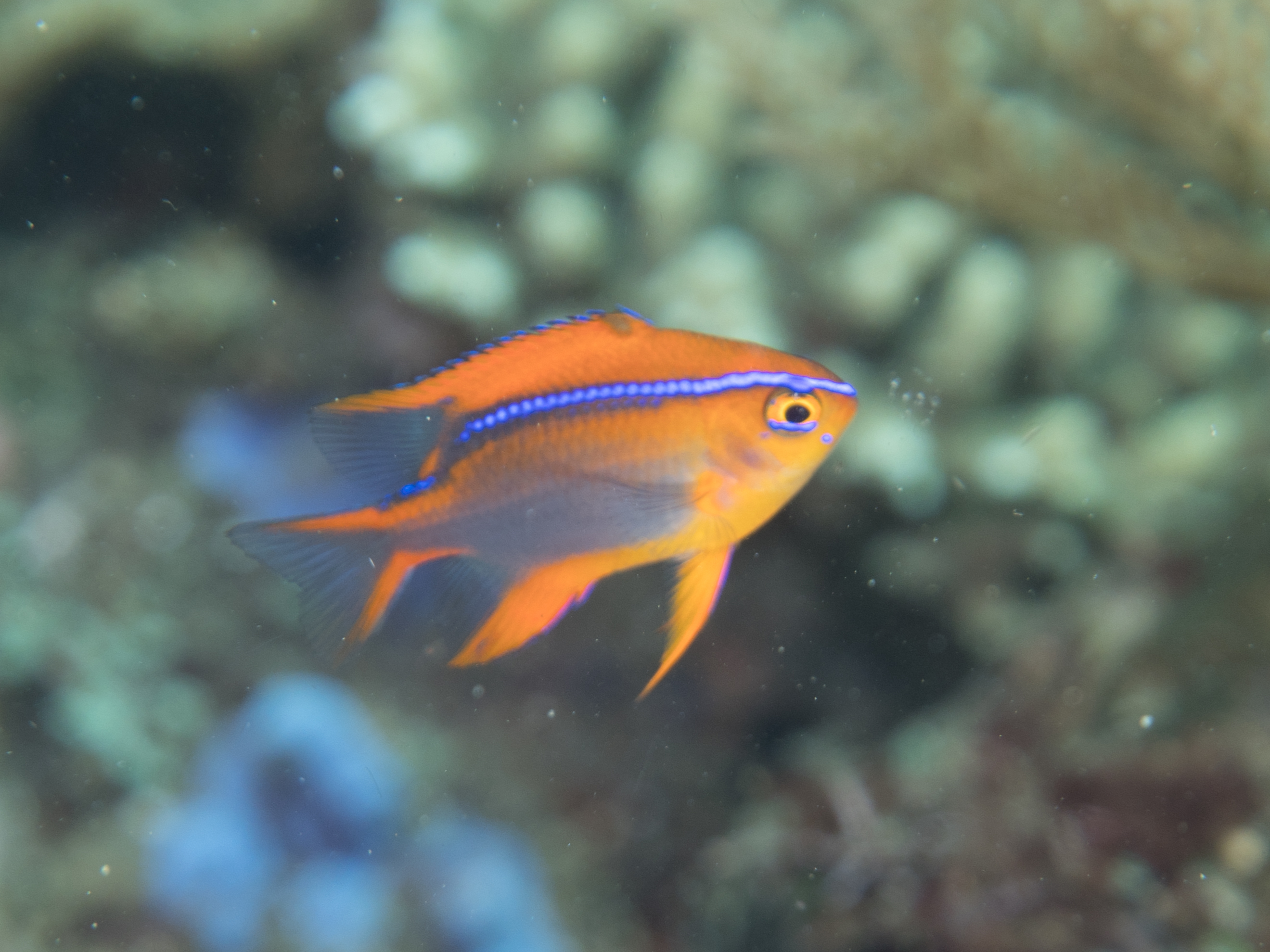

Conservation status
- Least Concern (IUCN 3.1)

Scientific classification
- Kingdom: Animalia
- Phylum: Chordata
- Class: Actinopterygii
- Order: Blenniiformes
- Family: Pomacentridae
- Genus: Neoglyphidodon
- Species: N. crossi

Binomial name
- Neoglyphidodon crossi Allen, 1991

= Neoglyphidodon crossi =

Species of fish

Neoglyphidodon crossi is a species of damselfish found in the western and central Pacific. It can grow to a maximum of 10 centimetres (3.9 in) in length. It occasionally makes its way into the aquarium trade.

== Distribution and habitat ==
Neoglyphidodon crossi is found in mostly in the Pacific Ocean. It is found around Indonesia, the Philippines, and Papua New Guinea. They are found at a depth range of 1 to 12 metres (3.3 to 39.4 ft). Usually, they are found in coral reefs.

== Description ==
Adults can grow up to a maximum size of 10 centimetres (3.9 in). They have 13 dorsal spines, 14 to 16 dorsal soft rays, 2 anal spines, and 13 to 14 anal soft rays. Juveniles are orange with a black bottom and a blue line that extends from its snout to its caudal pentacle. Adults are more grayish with less orange spots and their line is less blue.

== Ecology ==
=== Diet ===
This fish is omnivorous.

=== Behaviour ===
Adults of this species are solitary.

== In the aquarium ==
This fish is found in the aquarium trade.

== Breeding ==
Females lay into the substrate. The males then guard and aerate the eggs until they hatch.
