= Neoglyphidodon carlsoni =

Scientific classification
- Kingdom: Animalia
- Phylum: Chordata
- Class: Actinopterygii
- Division: Teleostei
- Order: Blenniiformes
- Family: Pomacentridae
- Genus: Neoglyphidodon
- Species: N. carlsoni

Binomial name
- Neoglyphidodon carlsoni (Allen, 1975)

Species of fish

Neoglyphidodon carlsoni is a species of damselfish in the family Pomacentridae. It is found in the western and central Pacific Ocean. Adults can grow up to a maximum length of 10 centimetres (3.9 in) This fish is omnivorous. Occasionally, they are found in the aquarium trade.

== Distribution and habitat ==
This fish is found in the western and central Pacific Ocean. It ranges from the Great Barrier Reef in Australia to Fiji and Tonga. Adults are found in fringing coral reefs. This species is present at depths of 1 to 5 metres (3.3 to 16.4 ft).

== Description ==
Adults of this species can grow up to a maximum length of 10 centimetres (3.9 in). They have 13 dorsal spines, 13 to 15 dorsal soft rays, 2 anal spines, and 12 to 14 anal soft rays. Unlike most species in the genus Neoglyphidodon, the coloouration of the adults and juveniles of this species is similar. This fish is black in color.

== Ecology ==
=== Diet ===
This fish is omnivorous.

=== Behaviour ===
This fish is associated with corals in a coral reef.

== In the aquarium ==
Neoglyphidodon carlsoni is occasionally found in the aquarium trade.

== Breeding ==
Females lay their eggs in the substrate or rubble then the male guards and aerates them.

== Etymology ==
The specific name honours the aquarist and ichthyologist Bruce Carlson, who collected the type and who made detailed notes on its habitat. He also contributed many records of new species of damselfish for Fiji.
