= Queensborough River =

Queensborough Dormittys, Queensboro, Queenborough
- Location of the Queensborough River mouth, north of the Black-Allan Line in New South Wales

Location
- Country: Australia
- States: Victoria, New South Wales
- Region: Australian Alps (IBRA), Victorian Alps, Snowy Mountains
- LGAs: East Gippsland, Snowy Monaro

Physical characteristics
- Source: Errinundra Plateau
  - location: near Combienbar, East Gippsland, Victoria
  - coordinates: 37°15′33″S 148°57′07″E
  - elevation: 885 m (2,904 ft)
- Mouth: confluence with the Bendoc River to form the Little Plains River
  - location: near Craigie, Snowy Mountains, New South Wales
  - coordinates: 37°07′54″S 149°02′04″E
  - elevation: 755 m (2,477 ft)
- Length: 19 km (12 mi)

Basin features
- River system: Snowy River catchment
- Tributaries
  - left: Back Creek (Victoria)
- National park: Errinundra NP

The Queensborough River is a perennial river of the Snowy River catchment, in the Alpine regions of the Australian states of Victoria and New South Wales.

== Course and features ==
The Queensborough River rises on the Errinundra Plateau, approximately 11 kilometres (6.8 mi) north northwest of Combienbar, in East Gippsland, Victoria. The river flows generally north northwest and north northeast, joined by one minor tributary, before joining with the Bendoc River to form the Little Plains River approximately 7 kilometres (4.3 mi) south southwest of Craigie, north of the Black-Allan Line that forms part of the border between Victoria and New South Wales. The river descends 130 metres (430 ft) over its 19-kilometre (12 mi) course.

== See also ==
- List of rivers of New South Wales (L–Z)
- List of rivers of Australia
- Rivers of New South Wales
