= Delegate River Diversion Tunnel =

River diversion tunnel in Victoria, Australia

Coordinates: 37°9′46″S 148°47′3″E

The Delegate River Diversion Tunnel is a Victorian gold rush diversion tunnel on the Delegate River in east Gippsland, Victoria, Australia - approximately 70 km north-east of Orbost . The river eventually runs through the township of Delegate, New South Wales. The tunnel is approximately 60 m long and diverts the river away from its original course.

The tunnel was dug in 1889 by the Delegate River Gold Sluicing Co, which was formed to sluice the terrace wash above the alluvial flats just below the point where the Bendoc to Bonang road crosses the Delegate River.

The site is listed in the Victorian Heritage Register.
