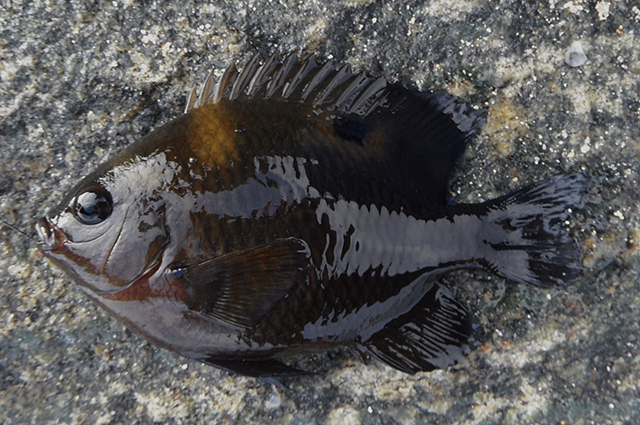

Conservation status
- Least Concern (IUCN 3.1)

Scientific classification
- Kingdom: Animalia
- Phylum: Chordata
- Class: Actinopterygii
- Order: Blenniiformes
- Family: Pomacentridae
- Genus: Neoglyphidodon
- Species: N. bonang

Binomial name
- Neoglyphidodon bonang (Bleeker, 1852)

= Neoglyphidodon bonang =

Species of fish

Neoglyphidodon bonang is a species of damselfish in the family Pomacentridae. It is native to the Indo-Pacific. Adults can grow up to a maximum length of 13.5 centimetres (5.3 in). This fish is omnivorous. It is found in the aquarium trade.

== Distribution and habitat ==
This species of damselfish is native to the Indo-Pacific. In the Indian Ocean, they are found from Sri Lanka, Indonesia around Sumatra and Java and, Australia. In the Pacific Ocean, its range extends from Sulawesi in Indonesia to the Solomon Islands. They inhabit coral reefs. This fish is present in a depth range from 1 to 20 metres (3.3 to 65.6 ft).

== Description ==
Adults of this species can grow up to a maximum length of up to 13.5 centimetres (5.3 in). They have 13 dorsal spines, 15 to 16 dorsal soft rays, 2 anal spines, and 13 to 15 dorsal soft rays. Like most species of the genus Neoglyphidodon, juveniles and adults of this species have different colouration. Adults are black. Juveniles are orange or yellow with a black spot around their dorsal fin. Around that black spot, it has a blue circle around it. There is usually a blue pattern of lines that extends from its eye towards the black spot.

== Ecology ==
=== Diet ===
This fish is omnivorous.

== In the aquarium ==
This fish is found in the aquarium trade.

== Reproduction ==
Females lay their eggs on the bottom of the seafloor. The males guard and aerate the eggs until they hatch.
