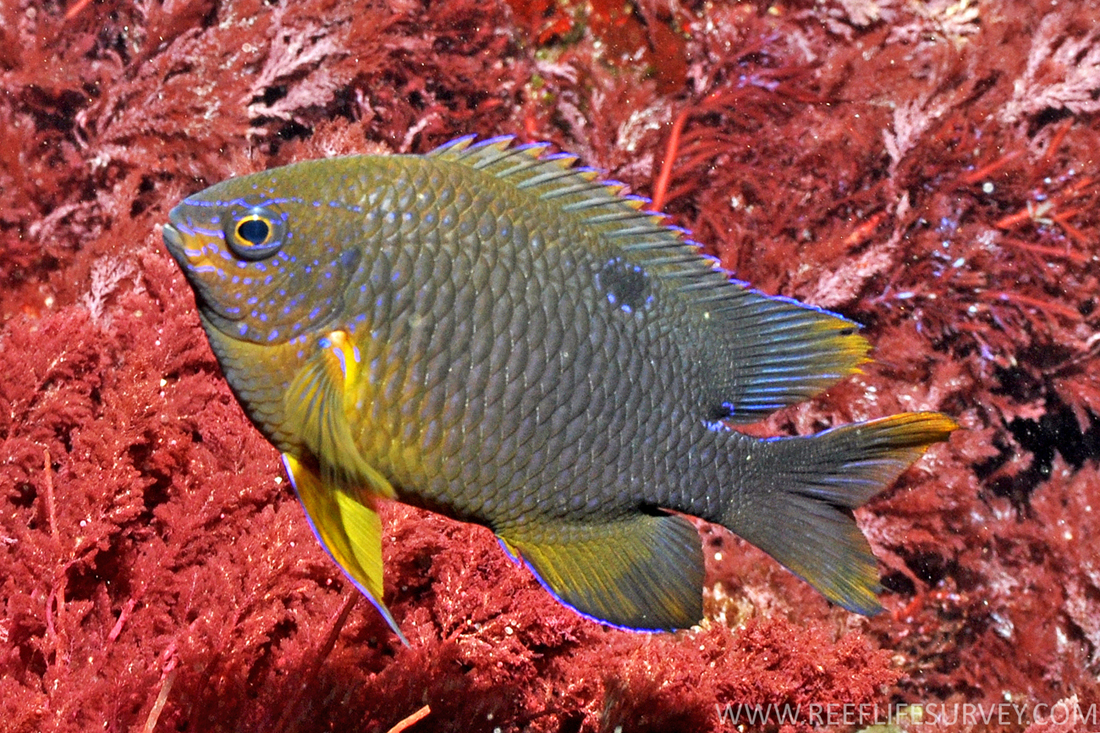

Conservation status
- Least Concern (IUCN 3.1)

Scientific classification
- Kingdom: Animalia
- Phylum: Chordata
- Class: Actinopterygii
- Order: Blenniiformes
- Family: Pomacentridae
- Genus: Neoglyphidodon
- Species: N. polyacanthus

Binomial name
- Neoglyphidodon polyacanthus (Ogilby, 1889)

Synonyms
- Glyphidodon polyacanthus Ogilby, 1889; Paraglyphidodon polyacanthus (Ogilby, 1889)

= Neoglyphidodon polyacanthus =

Species of fish

Neoglyphidodon polyacanthus is a species of damselfish of the family Pomacentridae. It is native to the western Pacific Ocean. This species of fish is found in the aquarium trade.

== Distribution and habitat ==
This species of fish is found in reefs in the western Pacific Ocean. Adults are found outside of lagoons while juvenile could be found in them. They are found in areas of the western Pacific Ocean from the southern Great Barrier Reef in Australia and New Caledonia. In Lord Howe Island, they are found everywhere. Neoglyphidodon polyacanthus is present at depths from 2 metres (6.6 ft) to 30 metres (98 ft).

== Description ==
Adults can grow up to 12 centimetres (4.7 in). The juvenile and adults of this species have different coloration. In adults, they have a grayish black coloration. Juveniles are yellow with blue lines extending from the eye to their eyespot. They lose their coloration as they mature.

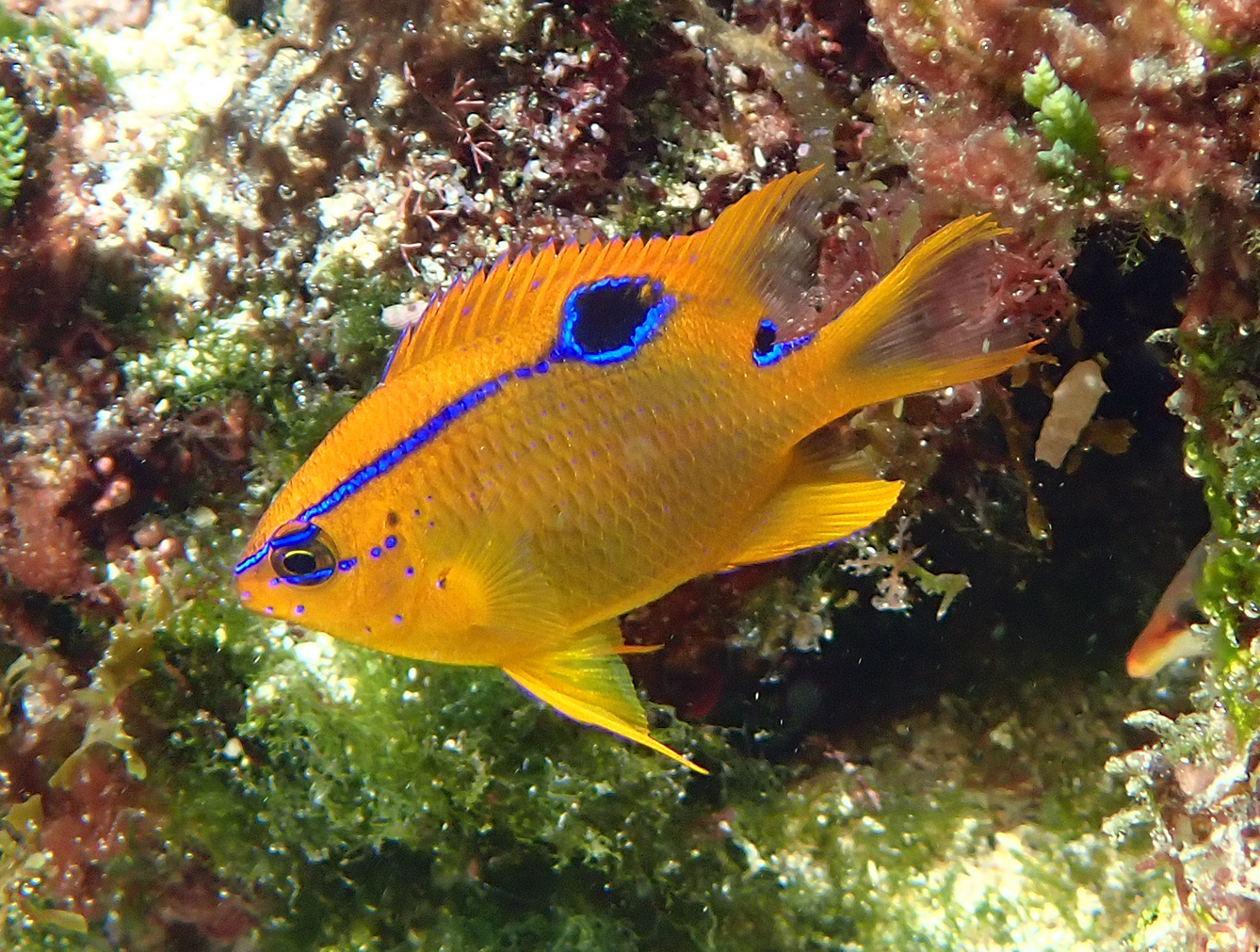
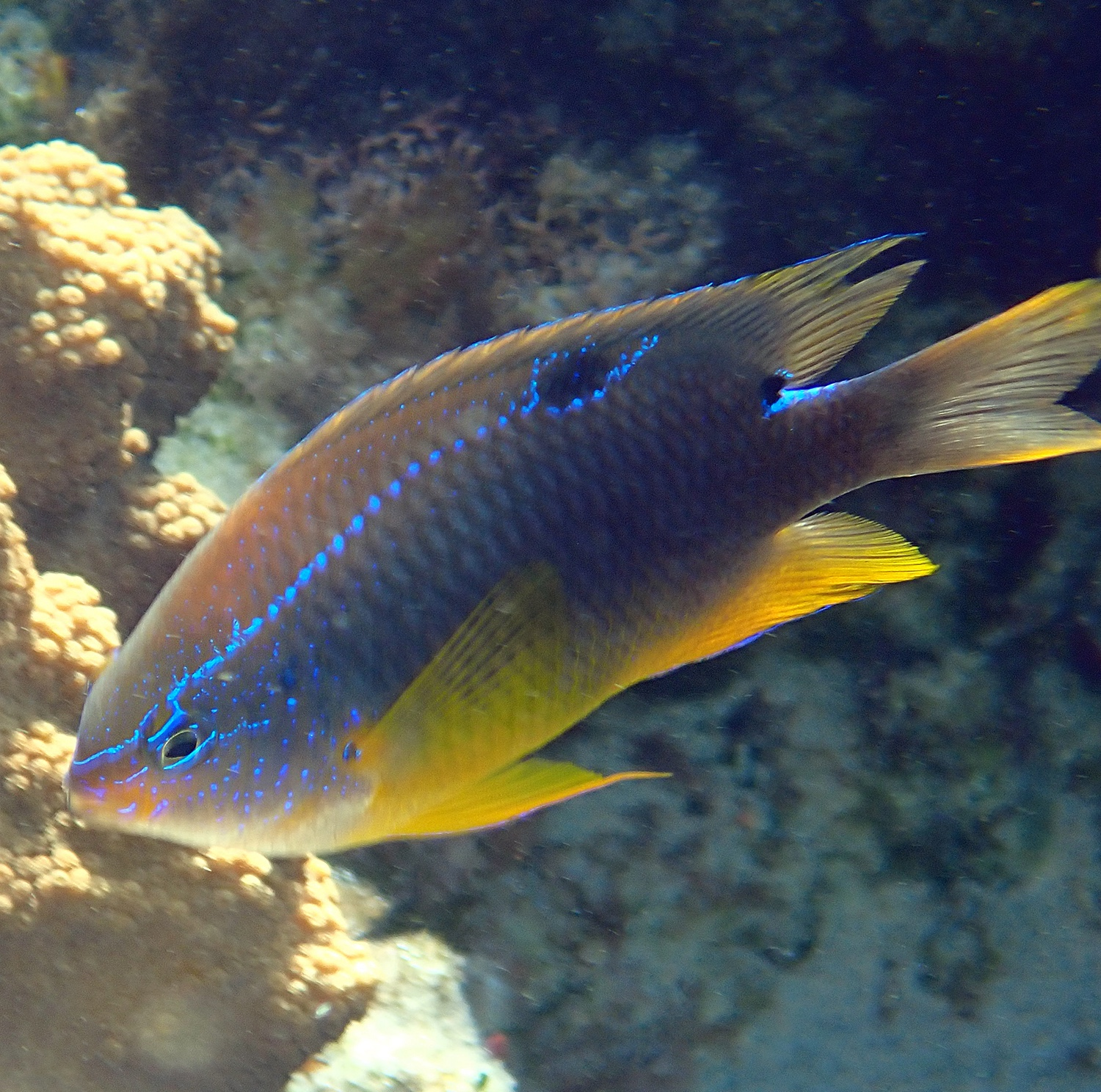
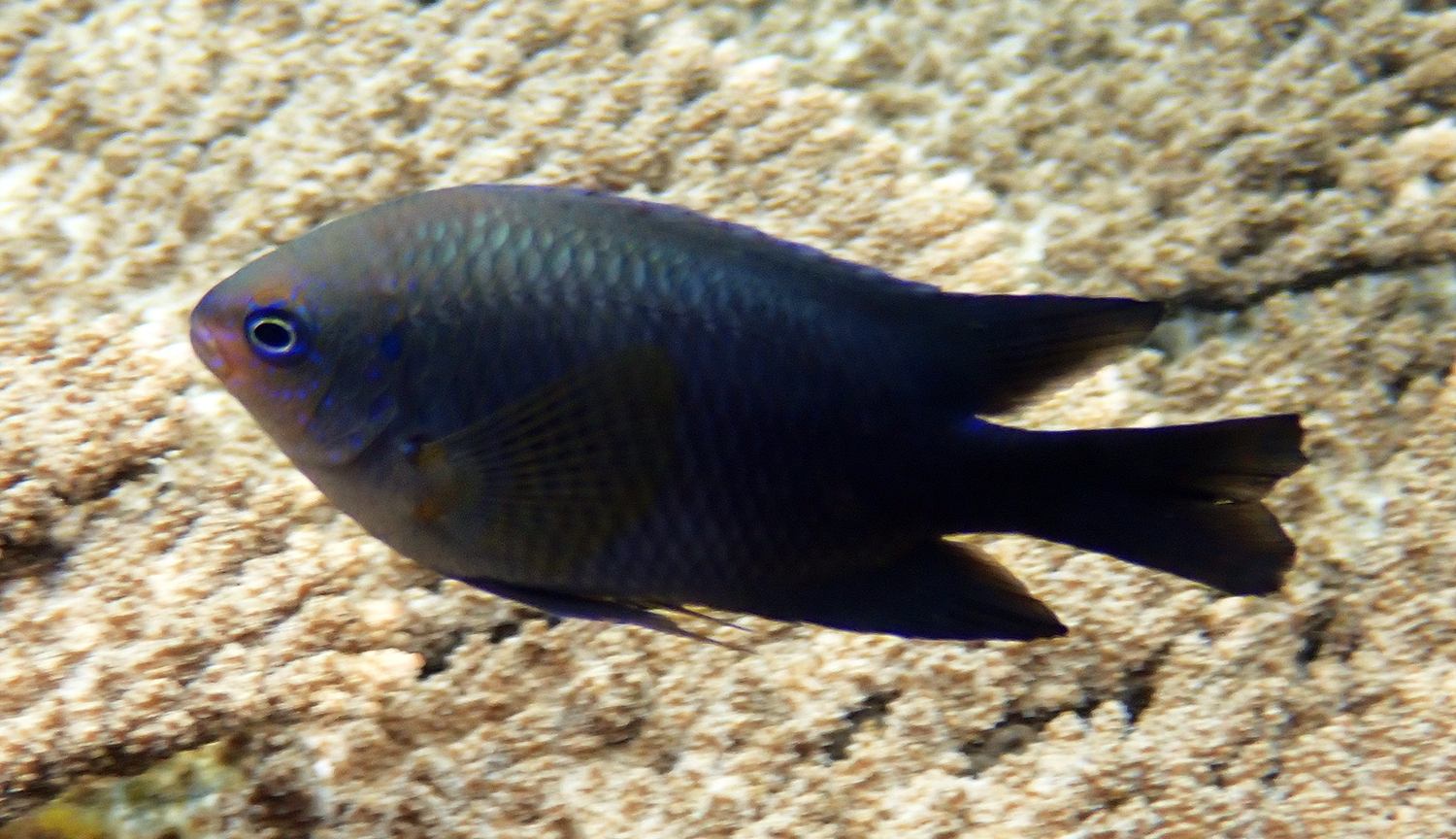
Growth (from juvenile to adult)

== In the aquarium ==
This species of damselfish is found in the aquarium trade. In the aquarium, people feed them flake food, frozen food, and live food.
