= Hutchinson Creek =

Stream in Washington, U.S.

Coordinates: 48°42′23″N 122°10′44″W

Hutchinson Creek is a stream in the U.S. state of Washington.

Hutchinson Creek was named after one Mrs. Hutchinson, a pioneer settler.

== See also ==
- List of rivers of Washington (state)
