= Delegate, New South Wales =

Delegate
- Town
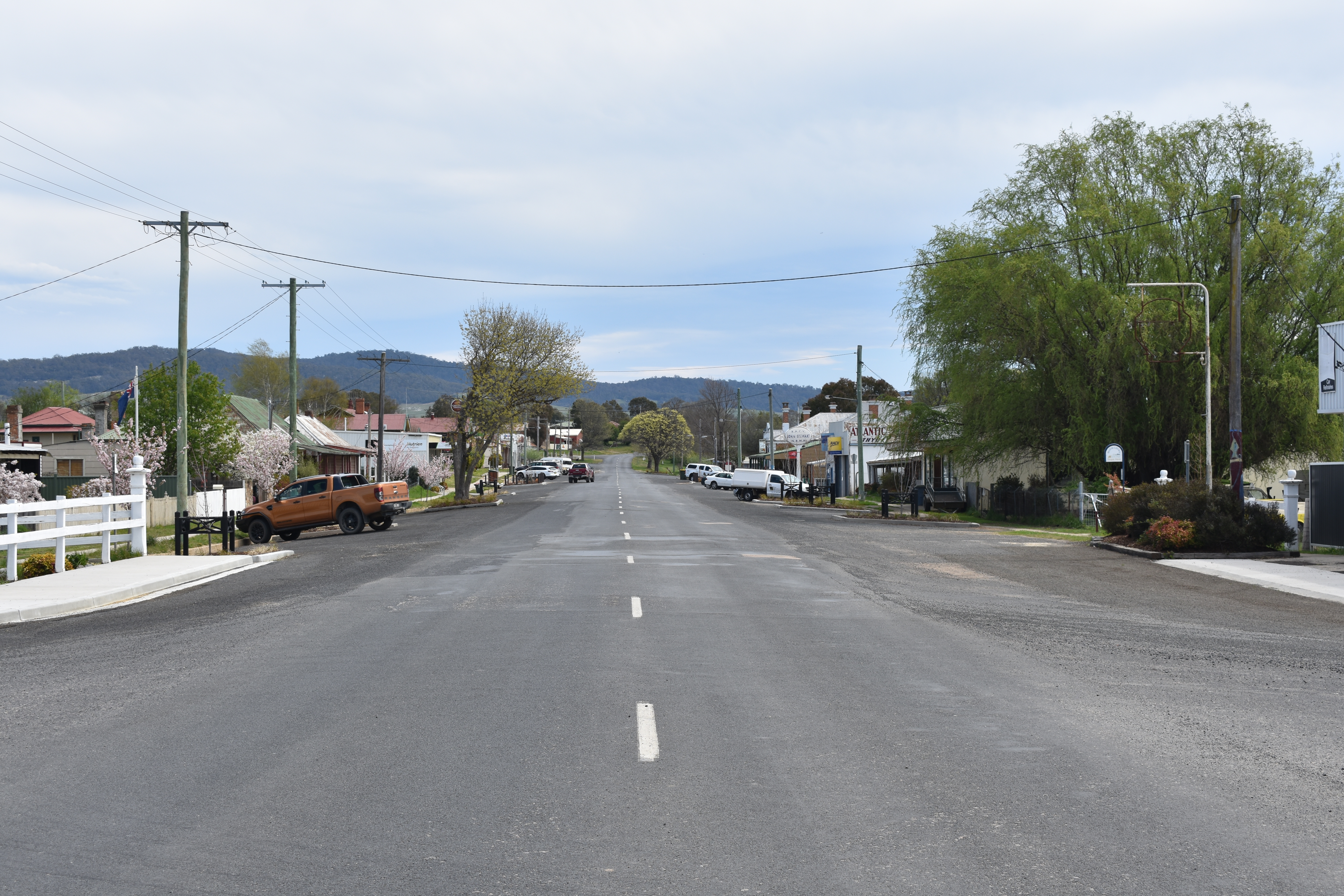
- Bombala St, the main street of Delegate - 2020

- Coordinates: 37°3′0″S 148°56′0″E
- Country: Australia
- State: New South Wales
- LGA: Snowy Monaro Regional Council
- Location: 523 km (325 mi) SSW of Sydney; 241 km (150 mi) S of Canberra; 118 km (73 mi) NNE of Orbost; 124 km (77 mi) S of Cooma; 38 km (24 mi) WSW of Bombala

Government
  - State electorate: Monaro
  - Federal division: Eden-Monaro
- Elevation: 761 m (2,497 ft)

Population
  - Total: 295 (2021 census)
- Postcode: 2633
- Mean max temp: 16.1 °C (61.0 °F)
- Mean min temp: 2.8 °C (37.0 °F)
- Annual rainfall: 988.5 mm (38.92 in)

Delegate is a small town in far southern New South Wales, Australia in Snowy Monaro Regional Council, 523 kilometres (325 mi) south-southwest of the state capital, Sydney.

The township is situated on the Delegate River, just a few kilometres north of the state border between New South Wales and Victoria. At the 2021 census, Delegate had a population of 295.

== Location and features ==
The place name, Delegate, may have derived from an Aboriginal word meaning "high mountains". The first village began in 1852 and was sited at Hayden's Bog, on the property now called "Bendolba". Mount Delegate, commonly known in the local area as "Delegate Hill", is situated across the border in Victoria, and stands at approximately 1,325 metres (4,347 ft) above sea level. It is the only single mountain in the Great Divide and of an unusual shape. Because of its height, Mount Delegate now has several telecommunication towers serving both NSW and Victoria.

== History ==
The original owners and inhabitants of the area were the Aboriginal peoples of the Ngarigo Nation.

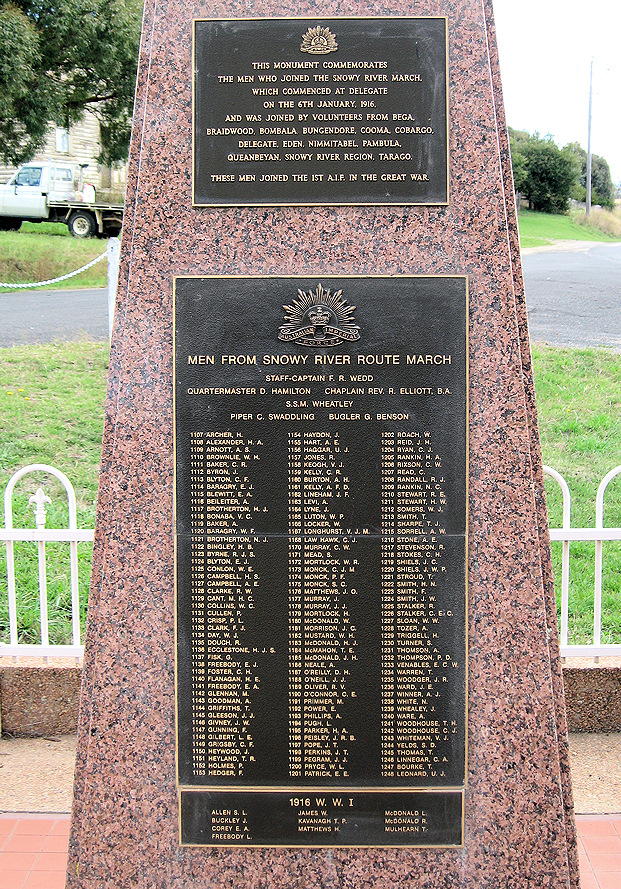
Men from Snowy River Memorial at Delegate.

The Delegate area was settled by Europeans in the 1820s, when Charles Campbell, youngest son of Robert Campbell of Duntroon, directed that "some of the shepherds move their animals towards the areas of the winter snows. They trekked, probably via Cooma, and settled a large number of stock in an area where they formed a new station. This the Campbells called Delegate. The stock spread over a large area and, as there was no other occupant of the district, 34,000 acres were annexed to the occupation of Robert Campbell, who later bought this property. Subsequently, while there were still no other serious competitors in the vicinity, Campbell's stock occupied a further 21,000 acres which came to be called Mt Cooper." Following Robert Campbell's death, the property at Delegate passed to his unmarried daughter, Sophia and from her to her nephews, John and Fredrick Jeffreys.

In 1870, a petition was forwarded to the Council of Education to request educational facilities at Craigie, Corrowong and Delegate and, in 1871, Delegate Public School was opened. Today the school serves a community of children whose parents are farmers, professional people, those employed by the timber industry, and others who work locally. The geographical location of Delegate Public School enables it to draw students from both New South Wales and Victoria.

The first place of worship on the Monaro (also known as Maneroo) district was the "Deligat" chapel. It was a slab building thatched with grass and stood on the bank of Church Creek and was of the Church of England denomination, now known as the Anglican Church of Australia. The site is identified in the Delegate Cemetery and marked by a shelter built during the 1988 Bicentennial Year. In October 1880 St Philip's Anglican Church in Heyden Street was licensed and consecrated in 1885. The Anglican Rectory was dedicated in 1938. In March 1978 the Anglican Parishes of Delegate and Bombala amalgamated to become the Parish of the Southern Monaro.

The original Catholic Church in Church Street, the street being appropriately named because of the church, was built in 1877 and in 1915 the present St Joseph's Catholic Church was built on the same site. The Catholic Parish of Delegate also includes St Peter's Corrowong west of Delegate. In 1921 the Sisters of St Joseph of the Sacred Heart (St Mary (MacKillop) of the Cross Order known as the "Brown Josephites") opened a school in Delegate which was first conducted in the church building. Sisters Alphonsus Kirton, Rodrigues Miller and Josephine Cahill, Cahill who in later years became Mother General of the Josephite Order, opened the school with 16 boys and 25 girls on the roll. The nuns first lived in Craigie Street on the site of the now Delegate Multi Purpose Service. A house was then purchased in Church Street for the nuns as a convent and an adjacent outbuilding served as the school. In 1943 a new school building was constructed in the church grounds. The Sisters raised their school to make secondary education available to the people of Delegate. With the introduction of the Wyndham Scheme and bus transport the Secondary section closed in 1963. A Presbytery was built for the priest in 1957 however it closed in 1973 and the Convent was then sold and the nuns moved into the Presbytery and hence it became the new St Joseph's Convent. With the low numbers of Sisters to teach and an enrolment of only 33 pupils, St Joseph's Convent School closed in 1981. In November 2015 the Catholic Parish celebrated the 100-year centenary of the present church with a special Mass and dedicated a permanent history display in the former school building to record the history of the parish. The school building was modified with new facilities in 2017 and renamed as St Joseph's School Centre.

St Andrew's Presbyterian Church was opened in 1878. The church was built by William Moore and originally had a shingle roof which was replaced by an iron roof in 1912. The original organ was installed in 1901 and the bell in the church grounds was erected in 1905. Families prominent in the church's history are the Campbells, Rankins, Olivers, Sivewrights, Martins and others of Scotch ancestry. As numbers of Presbyterians diminished over the years, the church was sold in 2009. The Delegate Progress Association have taken ownership of the church, and local religious of other denominations now conduct services there to keep it maintained as part of the Delegate Community.

Delegate was one of the sites proposed for Australia's national capital, prior to the selection of Canberra.

The local School of Arts building has a museum that displays the history of the area. Honour rolls in the main part of the building record the names of locals who served in both wars as well as a memorial stone at the front of the building commemorating the original Men from Snowy River March in 1916. Like many country halls, it also served as a picture theatre for many years. Delegate was the start for the Men from Snowy Marches during World War I and World War II.

In the early 1920s, artist Hilda Rix Nicholas stayed in the Delegate area, where she painted several major works, including In Australia and His Land. She returned and settled in the district with her husband Edgar Wright, and died there in 1961.

== Climate ==
Delegate has a cool oceanic climate (Cfb), with cool to mild summers that are frequently interrupted by cold fronts, and frequent snowfalls in winter and spring (and more rarely, late spring and early summer snowfalls). On average there are 14.7 snowy days per annum. Being on the southern face of the dividing range, the region is shielded from the westerly storm track (in which case it would experience foehn winds), however its position well-south of the Monaro rain shadow exposes it to southerly and south-westerly systems. The latter is apparent in its high winter–spring precipitation and low maximum temperatures compared to Cooma or Bombala further north in the rain shadow proper.

The annual mean minimum temperature of 2.8 °C (37.0 °F), is extraordinarily low for its elevation. This is almost equal to that of Thredbo Village nearly 600 metres (2,000 ft) higher, showing the steep latitudinal gradient between the 36th and 37th parallels south.

Climate data for Craigie (Bondi Forest Lodge, 1930–1969, rainfall to 2022); 790 m AMSL; 37.15° S, 149.15° E
| Month | Jan | Feb | Mar | Apr | May | Jun | Jul | Aug | Sep | Oct | Nov | Dec | Year |
|---|---|---|---|---|---|---|---|---|---|---|---|---|---|
| Mean daily maximum °C (°F) | 23.1 (73.6) | 22.7 (72.9) | 20.4 (68.7) | 15.9 (60.6) | 12.6 (54.7) | 9.4 (48.9) | 8.7 (47.7) | 10.2 (50.4) | 13.3 (55.9) | 16.4 (61.5) | 18.6 (65.5) | 21.5 (70.7) | 16.1 (60.9) |
| Mean daily minimum °C (°F) | 7.3 (45.1) | 7.7 (45.9) | 6.2 (43.2) | 3.0 (37.4) | 0.4 (32.7) | −1.2 (29.8) | −2.6 (27.3) | −1.7 (28.9) | 0.2 (32.4) | 3.0 (37.4) | 4.9 (40.8) | 6.5 (43.7) | 2.8 (37.1) |
| Average precipitation mm (inches) | 73.0 (2.87) | 77.4 (3.05) | 75.7 (2.98) | 77.1 (3.04) | 77.6 (3.06) | 113.1 (4.45) | 79.2 (3.12) | 75.5 (2.97) | 70.7 (2.78) | 83.9 (3.30) | 94.8 (3.73) | 85.1 (3.35) | 988.5 (38.92) |
| Average precipitation days (≥ 0.2 mm) | 8.7 | 8.4 | 9.4 | 9.4 | 10.4 | 11.6 | 10.8 | 11.5 | 11.6 | 12.2 | 11.7 | 10.3 | 126.0 |
Source: Australian Bureau of Meteorology; Craigie (Bondi Forest Lodge)

== Current facilities ==
The Delegate Progress Association (DPA) is a vital part of the community and was twice featured on the Channel 9 program "A Current Affair". The Association operates from part of the residence of the old bank building, constructed by the Commercial Banking Company of Sydney in 1925. The DPA and the Bundian Way, a project of Eden Local Aboriginal Land Council, have now established a gallery in the old banking chambers.

In 2006, after a wait of more than 130 years, the eastern straight-line portion of the NSW and Victorian border was formally recognised at a historical ceremony at Delegate River, just south of Delegate. A crowd of over 300 people gathered at a site known as Allan's Peg on the Bonang Highway for the occasion, with the Governor of Victoria, John Landy, and Governor of NSW, Professor Dame Marie Bashir, officiating.

In 2011, at their Annual Show, the Delegate Show Society launched a book outlining the local history, entitled From Dizligit to Delegate, written by Malcolm Martin.

== Sports ==
Delegate is a strong rugby league town, however, due to its relatively small population, it no longer has a rugby league club. The town's team, the Delegate Tigers, played in the old Group 19 competition and won the Clayton Cup as the team with the best record in regional NSW in 1970. They moved to Group 16 a year later, and merged with neighbours Bombala to form Bombala-Delegate (since reverted back to simply being known as Bombala) in the early 1980's. The club hosts one match in Delegate per season.

These days, the Bombala Blue Heelers rugby league club play one home game per year in Delegate, as many players for the club have come from Delegate since the Tigers' folding.
