= Grey gum =

Grey gum is a common name for several similar types of Eucalyptus trees.

The large-fruited grey gums are four related species found in eastern Australia:

- Eucalyptus punctata of the Sydney Basin is the best known
- E. longirostrata from eastern Queensland
- E. biturbinata from the New England region
- E. canaliculata from the vicinity of Gloucester and Dungog in central-northern New South Wales.

The small-fruited grey gums are:

- Eucalyptus propinqua of the New South Wales central coast
- Eucalyptus major of southeastern Queensland
