= Langley Vale Timber Tramway =

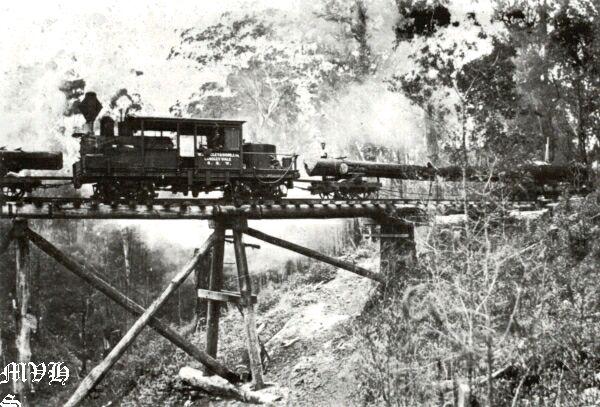
- 18 t Climax A-Class locomotive of William Langley, & Sons Ltd, Serial No x138 of 1912

Technical
- Line length: 20 kilometres (12 mi)
- Track gauge: 4 ft 2 in (1,270 mm)

The Langley Vale Timber Tramway was a 20-kilometre (12 mi) long narrow gauge railway network with mainly wooden rails with a gauge of 4 ft 2 in (1,270 mm). It was used from 1897 to 1933 for transporting logs to a sawmill at Lansdowne in the Manning River Valley, north of Taree, New South Wales.

== Route ==
The track started at the sawmill and ran upwards with grades of up to 12,5 % (1 : 8) over rough trestles with a length of up to 50 m (50 yards), over Cross's Mountain, across Razorback, down a declivity, and up another rise, which forms the western wall of Hannam Vale, being about 365 m (1200 ft) above the starting point. The uphill journey needed normally less than 3–4 hours.

In the Lansdowne State Forest, as well as in Langley's private holdings tall timbers were harvested, including blackbutt, tallowwood, grey gum, flooded gum, bloodwood, white mahogany, turpentine and brush box but no ironbark.

== Operation ==
The railway and the sawmill were owned and managed by William Edwin Langley (born 3 February 1860 in Shoalhaven; died 11 Nov 1946 in Taree). He joined his father's business (subsequently Langley Bros.) after serving his time as a joiner in 1879. His new sawmill was inaugurated on 3 July 1902. In April 1931 he became president of the Timber Merchants Association.

== Locomotive ==
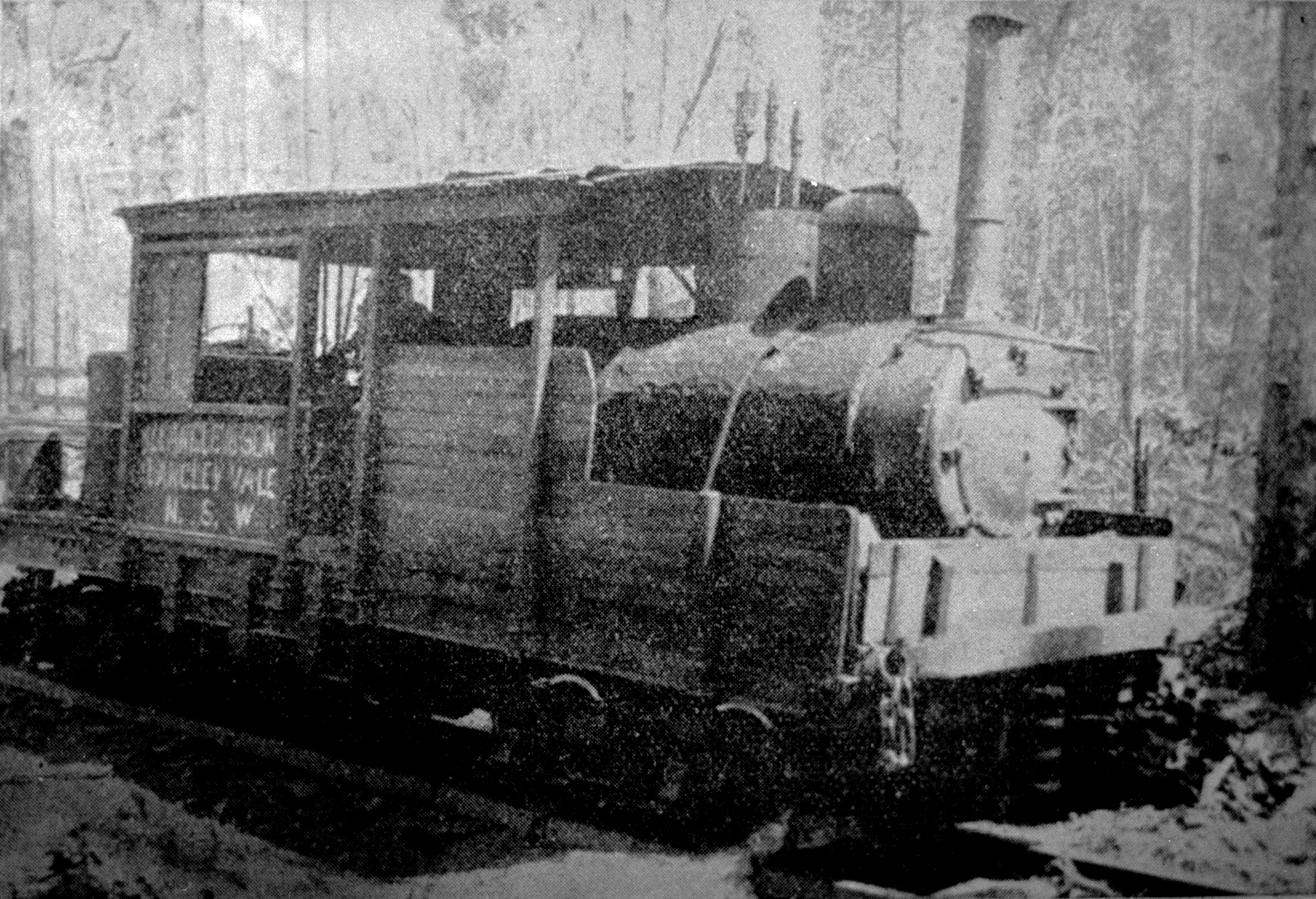
Climax locomotive with sign W. Langley & Son, Langley Vale, N.S.W.

From 1912 the 18-ton Climax Class A locomotive with serial number x38 of 1912 was used. It was sold in November 1933 to Smith & Ellis Ltd. in Langley Vale. In 1942 it was regauged to 3 ft 6 in (1,067 mm) and used at Circular Head Amalgamated Timber Co. in Smithton, Tasmania. There it was dismantled in 1971 and scrapped.

== Ships ==
The Langley brothers owned and operated also several ships. These moored at either the mill wharf or at sleeper yard 6 chains (120 m) from the mill wharf. The Gwendoline was a topsail schooner built in 1897 at Coopernook, NSW. She was 84 tons, 86 feet long, 23.1 feet wide and had a 7.2 foot draft. The Gwendoline was owned by the Langley Brothers Company and made frequent trips between Sydney and the Tweed from 1897 to 1903.

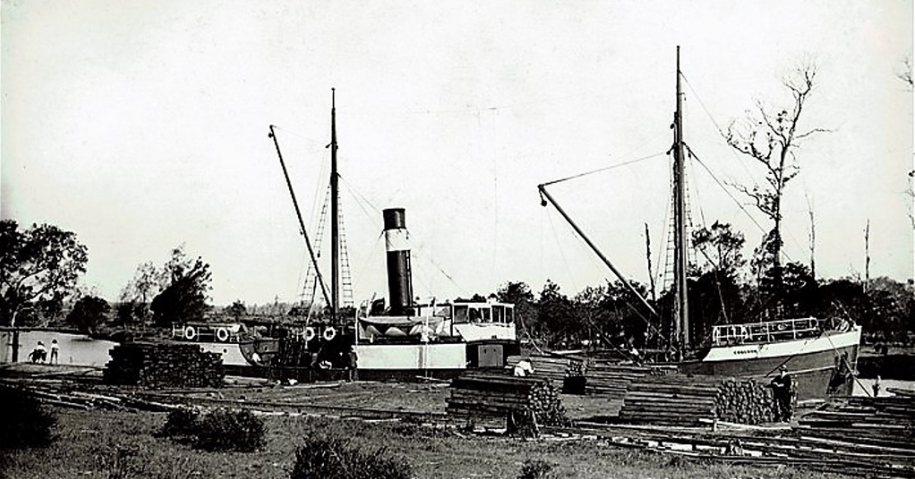
SS Cooloon loading sleepers at the sleeper wharf, 6 chains (120 m) from the mill wharf on the Lansdowne River

Gilbert Mowatt built in 1904 the steam ship Cooloon for Alfred Langley and Robert H Langley who were trading as Langley Brothers & Co. at the site of their mill at Rockville near Lansdowne. She was made from colonial hardwood and tastefully fitted throughout her saloon in mahogany and pine panelling painted with country scenes by the ladies of the Manning. It was named after the township of Cooloon on the Tweed River.

The steamer Duroby belonged also to the Langley Brothers.

== Cultural heritage protection ==
The track of the Langley Vale Tramway runs through forest compartments No 193, 194 and 195 mainly along Rock Creek. The route is shown on the Harvest Plan Operational Maps. The remains of the trestles, embankments and cuttings are protected as cultural heritage. The objective of the relevant prescriptions is to preserve all substantial remnants of earthworks and infrastructure, especially cuttings where encountered.

Historic structures in the tramway corridor may not be disturbed. Trees are not to be felled into the tramway corridor, where a cutting exists, however, if a tree is accidentally felled, it may be removed, if this can be carried out without causing damage to the cutting. Felling of trees out of the tramway corridor may only be approved if the activity will not cause damage to the cuttings. Machinery may not enter the tramway corridor except to cross, where the tramway is level with the ground surface, i.e. where no substantial earthworks are present. Snigging along the tramway is not permitted.

== Additional literature ==
- The Langley Vale tramway – Part 1, 1897–1912 (New South Wales). Light Railways No. 226, August 2012.
- The Langley Vale tramway – Part 2, 1912–1933 (New South Wales). Light Railways No. 227, October 2012.
- Ian McNeil: Langley Vale Tramway. Cundletown Museum.

== Videos ==
- Forest Wealth, 1925. Forestry Commission, 1991. Version of 2012 and identical version of 2013
- Forest Wealth, 1924. 20 min long version with voiceover of 1980
