= Barakee National Park =

National park in New South Wales, Australia

- IUCN category II (national park)
- Location within New South Wales
- Location: New South Wales
- Coordinates: 31°38′30″S 151°51′06″E
- Area: 50.11 km^{2} (19.35 sq mi)
- Established: 1999
- Governing body: National Parks and Wildlife Service (New South Wales)

Barakee is a national park in New South Wales, Australia, 257 km north of Sydney. It is connected to Barakee State Conservation Area.

== Description ==
The park and conservation area form an ecological corridor from the Manning River floodplain to the Great Dividing Range, linking diverse habitats. It also supports several threatened animal species.

There is a high diversity of forest ecosystems and other vegetation communities in the area. It includes significant stands of old-growth forest and rainforest habitats. The vegetation is dominated by Sydney blue gum (Eucalyptus saligna), forest red gum (Eucalyptus tereticornis), river oak (Casuarina cunninghamiana), thin-leaved stringybark (Eucalyptus eugenioides), tallowwood (Eucalyptus microcorys), grey gums (Eucalyptus punctata, Eucalyptus canaliculata and Eucalyptus biturbinata), white mahogany (Eucalyptus acmenoides), pink bloodwood (Corymbia intermedia), broad-leaved apple (Angophora subvelutina) and apple box (Eucalyptus bridgesiana).

Threatened animal species include glossy black-cockatoo (Calyptorhynchus lathami), scarlet robin (Petroica boodang), flame robin (Petroica phoenicea), eastern false pipistrelle (Falsistrellus tasmaniensis), koala (Phascolarctos cinereus) and eastern bentwing-bat (Miniopterus schreibersii oceanensis).

Barakee is remote, and therefore doesn't have large numbers of visitors, but it provides a natural experience. Camping, swimming and fishing are possible in the park. Visitors can hike or drive four-wheel vehicles.

== Fires of 2019-2020 ==
The fires that took place in 2019/2020 left scars on some parts of the park. So many parts are closed to visitors, to give the habitat time to recover and to renew the infrastructure.

== See also ==
- Protected areas of New South Wales
