= Cooplacurripa =

Cooplacurripa may refer to:

- Cooplacurripa, New South Wales
- Cooplacurripa River
- Cooplacurripa Station
