= Mummel River =

River in New South Wales, Australia

Coordinates: 31°38′S 151°59′E

Location
- Country: Australia
- State: New South Wales
- IBRA: New England Tablelands, NSW North Coast
- District: Northern Tablelands, Mid North Coast
- Local government area: Mid-Coast Council

Physical characteristics
- Source: below Mount Sugarloaf, Great Dividing Range
  - location: near Devils Delight, southeast of Walcha
  - elevation: 1,080 m (3,540 ft)
- Mouth: confluence with the Cooplacurripa River
  - location: north of Giro, northwest of Taree
  - elevation: 177 m (581 ft)
- Length: 65 km (40 mi)

Basin features
- River system: Manning River catchment
- Tributaries
  - right: Williams Creek (New South Wales)
- National parks: Mummel Gulf, Cottan-Bimbang

Mummel River, a watercourse of the Manning River catchment, is located in the Northern Tablelands and Mid North Coast districts of New South Wales, Australia.

== Course and features ==
Mummel River rises on the eastern slopes of the Great Dividing Range, below Mount Sugarloaf, southeast of Walcha and flows generally south by west, southeast, and then south southeast, joined by one minor tributary, before reaching its confluence with the Cooplacurripa River, north of Giro, northwest of Taree. The river descends 898 metres (2,946 ft) over its 65 kilometres (40 mi) course. There are two fault lines that are near the path of the river.

== See also ==
- Rivers of New South Wales
- List of rivers of New South Wales (L–Z)
- List of rivers of Australia
