= Lansdowne, New South Wales (Mid-Coast Council) =

Town in New South Wales, Australia

Lansdowne
- Town
- Coordinates: 31°46′59″S 152°32′4″E
- Country: Australia
- State: New South Wales
- Region: Mid North Coast
- LGA: Mid-Coast Council
- Location: 331 km (206 mi) NNE of Sydney; 190 km (120 mi) NNE of Newcastle; 21 km (13 mi) NE of Taree; 70 km (43 mi) SSW of Port Macquarie

Government
  - State electorate: Myall Lakes
  - Federal division: Lyne
- Elevation: 12 m (39 ft)

Population
  - Total: 607 (SAL 2021)
- Time zone: UTC+10 (AEST)
  - Summer (DST): UTC+11 (AEDT)
- Postcode: 2430
Localities around Lansdowne
Upper Lansdowne	Waitui	Hannam Vale
Yarratt Forest	Lansdowne	Langley Vale
Melinga	Melinga	Moto

Lansdowne is a rural village on the Mid North Coast near Taree in New South Wales, Australia.

The village lies on the Lansdowne River valley, adjacent to the Coorabakh National Park and the village of Langley Vale, which was served by the Langley Vale Timber Tramway from 1897 to 1933, as well as Coopernook and the Lansdowne State Forests. It is the gateway to the Manning River Valley's northern hinterland.

In March 2008, the 14 hectare (0.14 km^{2}) Lansdowne Nature Reserve was established along the Lansdowne River, southeast of the town.

The first settler of Lansdowne was Benjamin Saville (1814–1896). In 1848 Benjamin purchased 50 acres on the northern bank of the Lansdowne river. The Saville property became the main crossing point for travellers going to and from Port Macquarie for nearly 40 years.

The village and surrounding areas are serviced by the local post office and general store, a primary school for children in kindergarten - year 6 and a bowling and recreation club.

There is an abundance of natural wildlife and fishing is a popular activity for locals.

At the 2021 census, Lansdowne had a population of 352 people.

The Lansdowne rail station on the North Coast Line was closed in 1975.

Historical population
Year	Pop.	±%
1971	243	—
1976	280	+15.2%
1981	286	+2.1%
1986	347	+21.3%
1991	382	+10.1%
1996	432	+13.1%
2001	416	−3.7%
2006	433	+4.1%
2011	369	−14.8%
2016	362	−1.9%
2021	352	−2.8%
Source: Australian Bureau of Statistics data.
