= Walcrow River =

River in New South Wales, Australia

Coordinates: 31°28′00″S 151°50′00″E

Location
- Country: Australia
- State: New South Wales
- Region: New England Tablelands (IBRA), NSW North Coast, Northern Tablelands
- Local government area: Mid-Coast Council

Physical characteristics
- Source: below Mount Carrington, within the Tia Range of the Great Dividing Range
  - location: south southeast of Walcha
  - elevation: 1,290 m (4,230 ft)
- Mouth: confluence with the Cooplacurripa River
  - location: north of Giro, northwest of Taree
  - elevation: 351 m (1,152 ft)
- Length: 25 km (16 mi)

Basin features
- River system: Manning River catchment
- Tributaries
  - right: Williams Creek (Walcrow, New South Wales)

Walcrow River, a watercourse of the Manning River catchment, is located in the Northern Tablelands and Mid North Coast districts of New South Wales, Australia.

== Course and features ==
Walcrow River rises within the Tia Range on the eastern slopes of the Great Dividing Range, below Mount Carrington, south southeast of Walcha and flows generally southeast by south, before reaching its confluence with the Cooplacurripa River, north of Giro, northwest of Taree. The river descends 935 metres (3,068 ft) over its 25 kilometres (16 mi) course.

== See also ==
- Rivers of New South Wales
- List of rivers of New South Wales (L–Z)
- List of rivers of Australia
