= Cooplacurripa River =

River in New South Wales, Australia

Coordinates: 31°24′S 151°45′E

Cooplacurripa River Number Two River
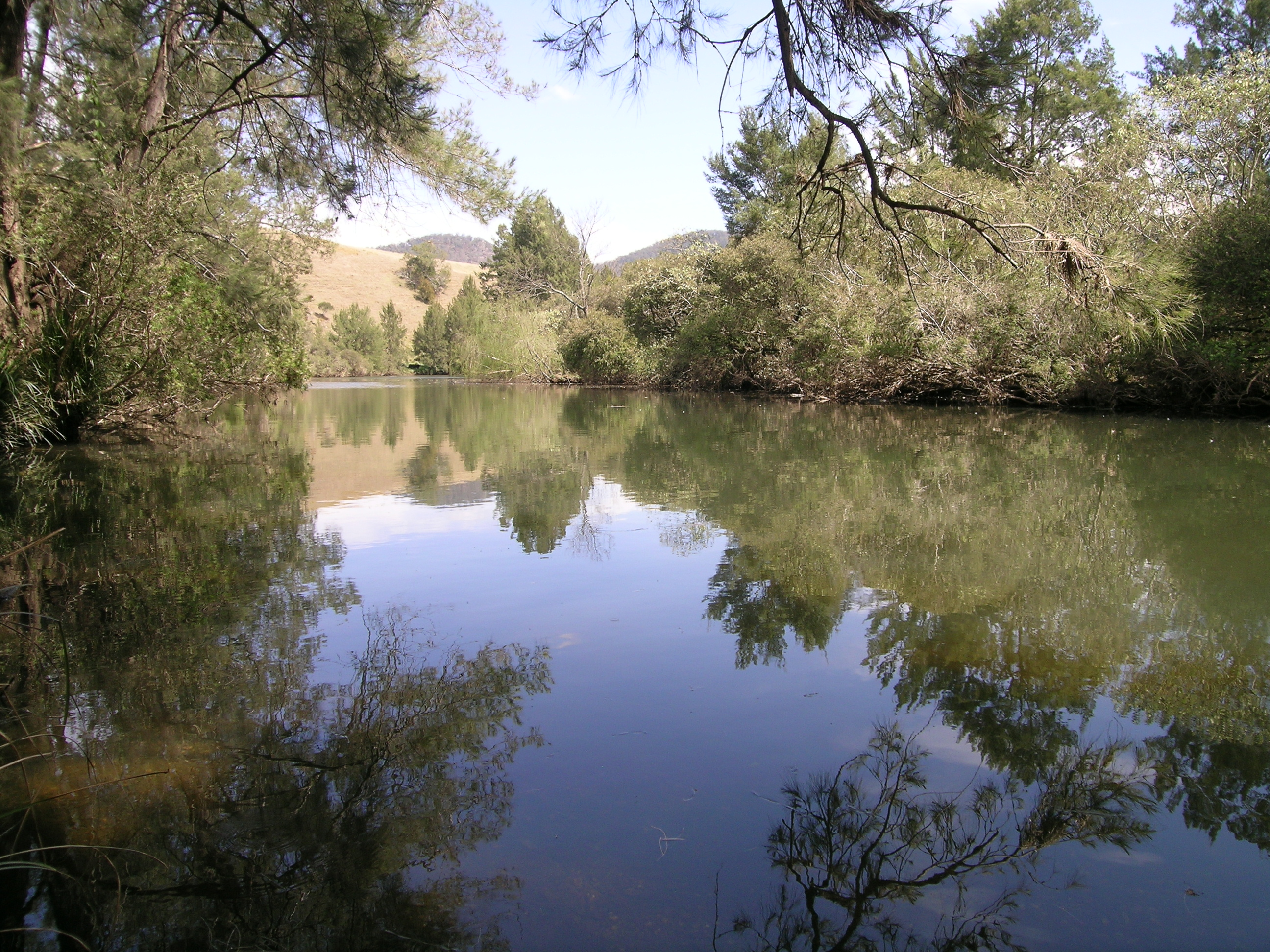

Location
- Country: Australia
- State: New South Wales
- IBRA: New England Tablelands, NSW North Coast
- District: Northern Tablelands, Mid North Coast
- Local government areas: Walcha, Mid-Coast Council

Physical characteristics
- Source: Great Dividing Range
  - location: southeast of Branga Plain, south of Walcha
  - elevation: 1,270 m (4,170 ft)
- Mouth: confluence with the Nowendoc River
  - location: north of Gloucester
  - elevation: 148 m (486 ft)
- Length: 79 km (49 mi)

Basin features
- River system: Manning River catchment
- Tributaries
  - left: Mummel River, Walcrow River
- National parks: Mummel Gulf, Cottan-Bimbang, Barakee

Cooplacurripa River, a perennial river of the Manning River catchment, is located in the Northern Tablelands and Mid North Coast districts of New South Wales, Australia.

The river flows through the small locality of Cooplacurripa, after which it is named.

== Course and features ==
Cooplacurripa River rises on the eastern slopes of the Great Dividing Range, southeast of Branga Plain, south of Walcha, and flows generally southeast by south, joined by two tributaries including the Mummel River and Walcrow River, before reaching its confluence with the Manning River, north of Gloucester. The river descends 1,120 metres (3,670 ft) over its 79 kilometres (49 mi) course.

Land adjacent to the Cooplacurripa River is principally used as grazing for beef cattle. The 22,560 hectares (55,700 acres) cattle station, Cooplacurripa, situated on the Cooplacurripa River, was formerly owned by the Australian Agricultural Company.

Cooplacurripa River falls within the Northern NSW Trout Waters and includes the whole of the waters of the river, its creeks and tributaries upstream from its junction with, and including, the Mummel River.

== See also ==
- Rivers of New South Wales
- List of rivers of New South Wales (A–K)
- List of rivers of Australia
