= White mahogany =

White mahogany is a common name for several trees and may refer to:

- Eucalyptus acmenoides, endemic to eastern Australia
- Eucalyptus umbra, native to Australia
- Khaya anthotheca, native to tropical Africa
