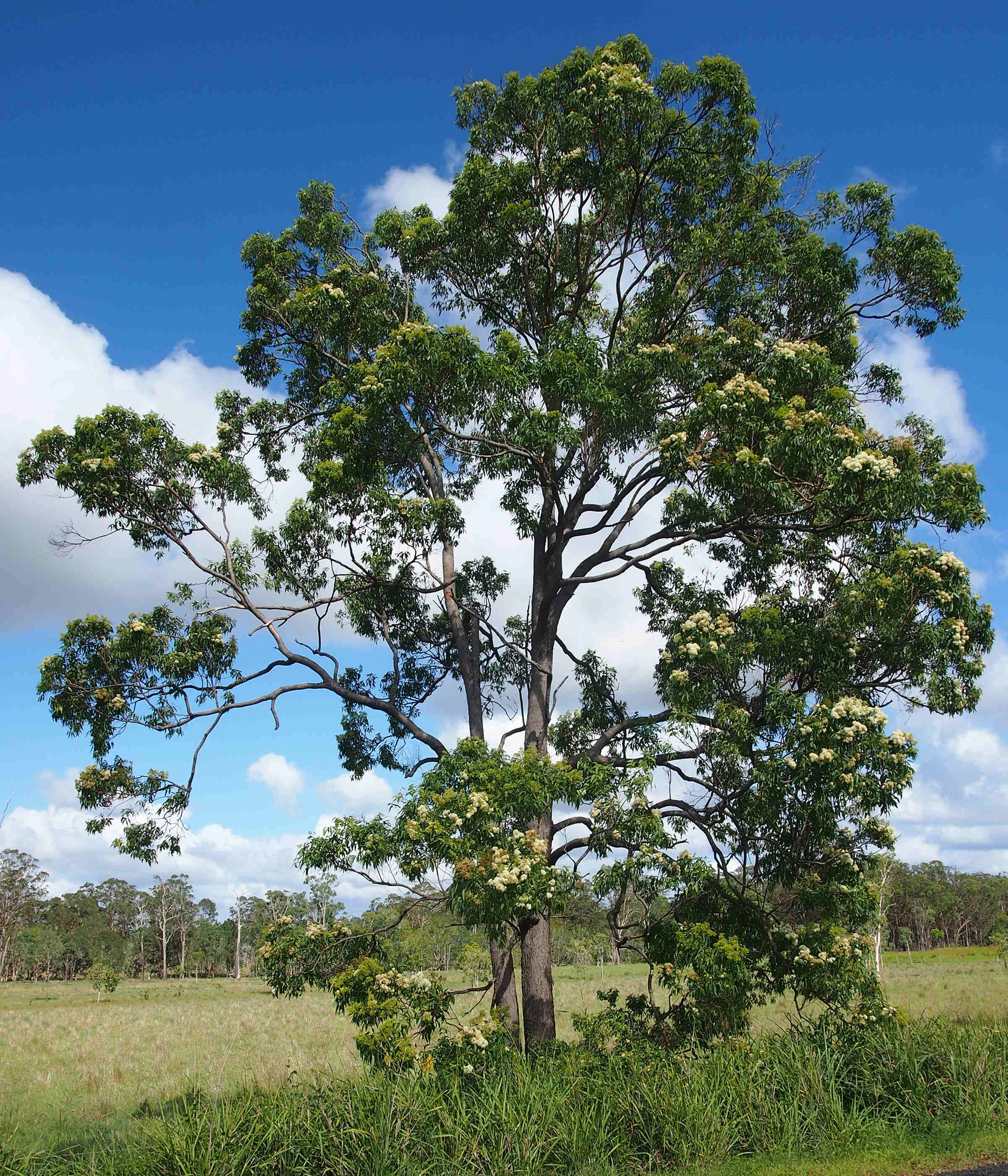

Scientific classification
- Kingdom: Plantae
- Clade: Tracheophytes
- Clade: Angiosperms
- Clade: Eudicots
- Clade: Rosids
- Order: Myrtales
- Family: Myrtaceae
- Genus: Corymbia
- Species: C. intermedia

Binomial name
- Corymbia intermedia (R.T.Baker) K.D.Hill & L.A.S.Johnson

Synonyms
- Eucalyptus gummifera var. intermedia (R.T.Baker) Domin; Eucalyptus intermedia R.T.Baker

= Corymbia intermedia =

Pink bloodwood

Species of plant

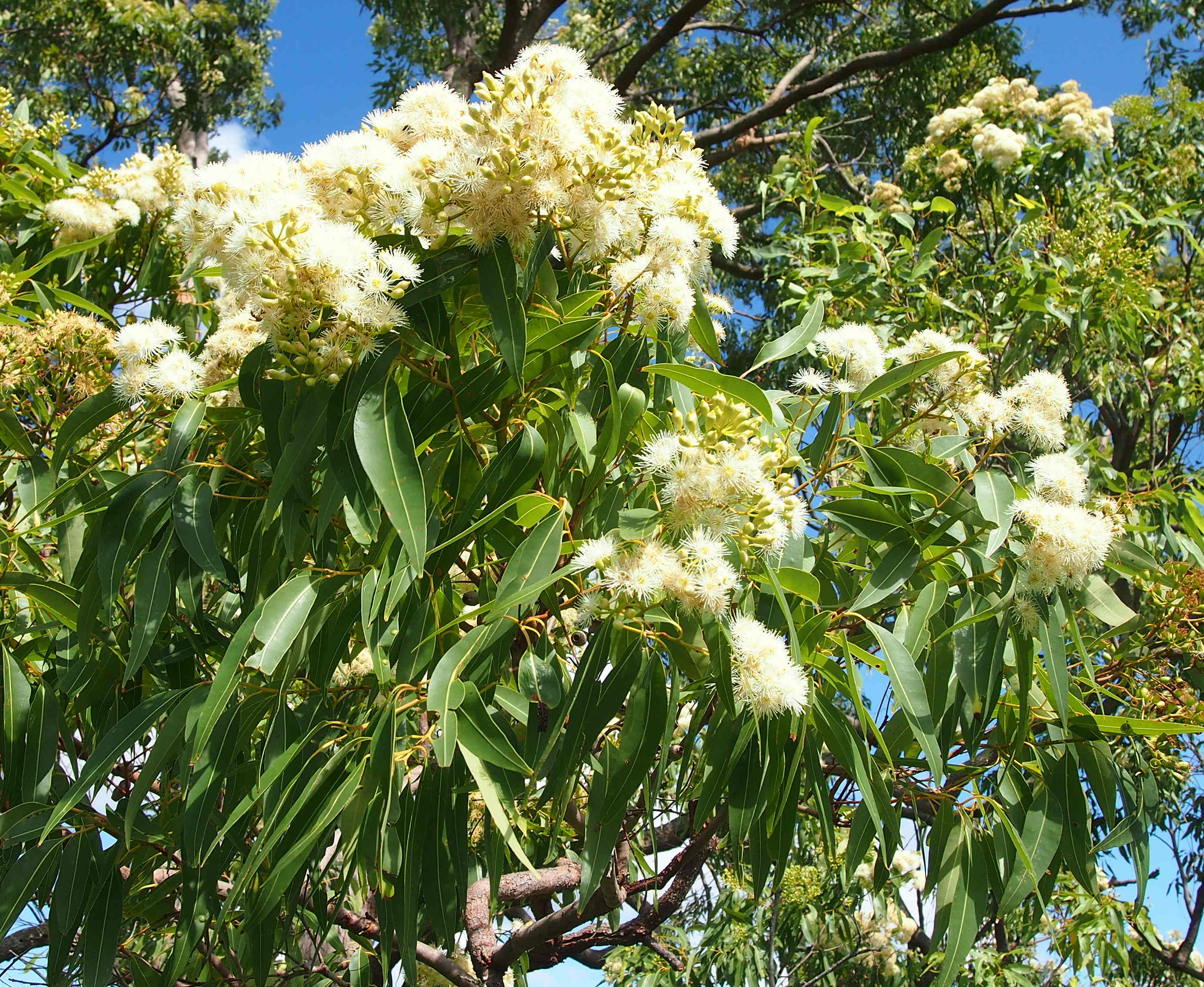
Flowers and foliage.

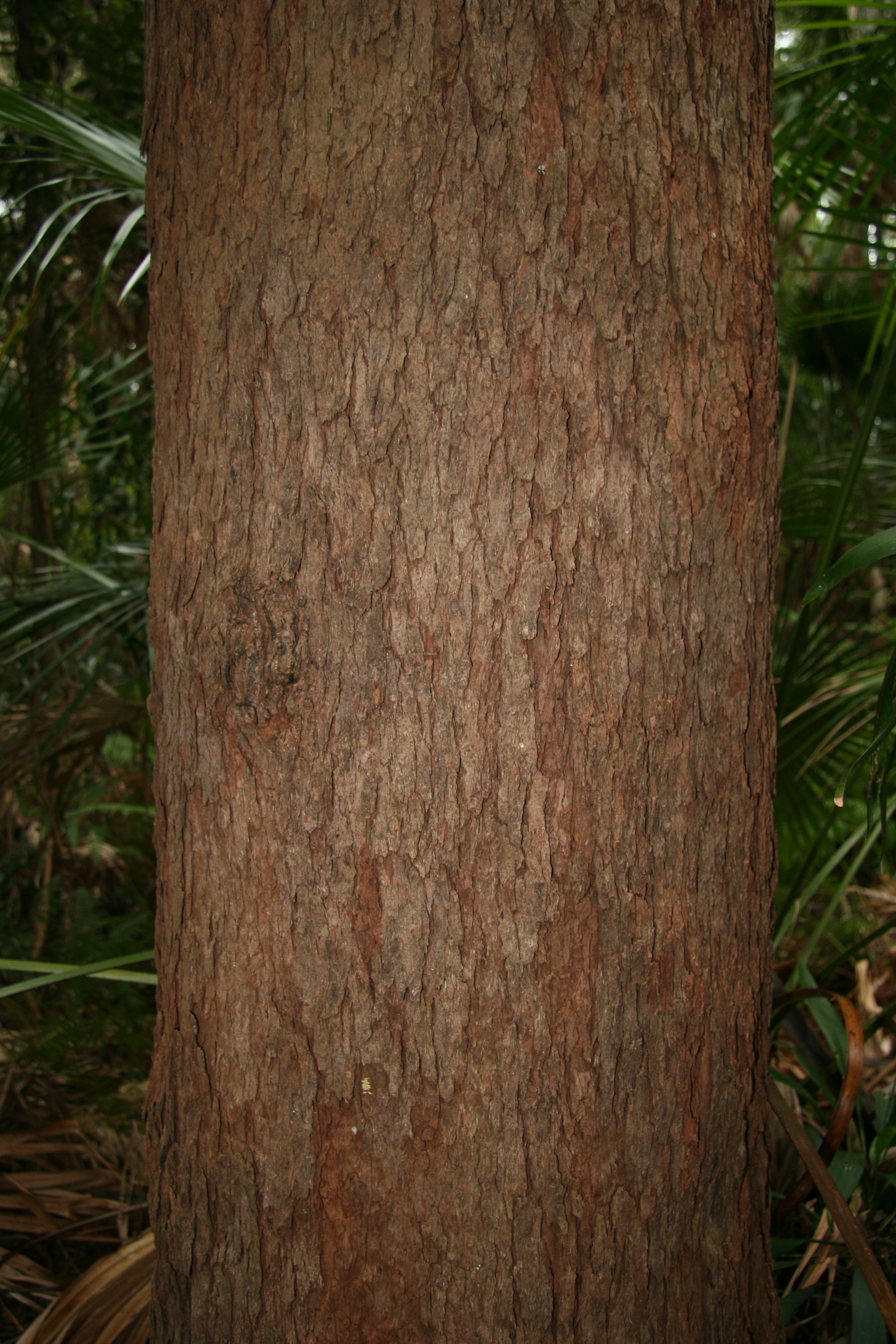
closeup of bark on trunk

Corymbia intermedia, commonly known as pink bloodwood, is a species of medium to tall tree that is endemic to north-eastern Australia. It has rough, tessellated bark on the trunk and branches, flower buds in groups of seven, white flowers and oval to barrel-shaped fruit.

== Description ==
The pink bloodwood is tree that can reach 20–30 m (65–100 ft) in height with a 10–20 m (35–65 ft) spread. The bark is rough, tessellated, light brown to grey in colour and extends from the trunk to the branches. Young plants and coppice regrowth have lance-shaped, dark green leaves that are paler on the lower surface, 80–160 mm (3.1–6.3 in) long and 20–42 mm (0.79–1.65 in) wide and petiolate. Adult leaves are arranged alternately, leathery, paler on the lower surface, lance-shaped, 80–150 mm (3.1–5.9 in) long and 13–40 mm (0.51–1.57 in) wide on a petiole 12–25 mm (0.47–0.98 in) long. The flower buds are arranged on the ends of branchlets on a branched peduncle 10–20 mm (0.39–0.79 in) long, each branch of the peduncle with seven buds on pedicels 2–15 mm (0.079–0.591 in) long. Mature buds are pear-shaped to oval, 7–10 mm (0.28–0.39 in) long and 4–6 mm (0.16–0.24 in) wide with a conical to rounded or beaked operculum. Flowering occurs from December to March and the profuse perfumed white or cream flowers are up to 20 mm (0.79 in) in diameter. The fruit is an urn-shaped, oval or barrel-shaped capsule 10–20 mm (0.39–0.79 in) long and 8–16 mm (0.31–0.63 in) wide with a short neck and the valves enclosed in the fruit.

The pink bloodwood resembles the red bloodwood, and the two species co-occur in central New South Wales. The latter species can be distinguished by its larger gumnuts and winged seeds.

== Taxonomy ==
Richard Thomas Baker was the first to formally describe the pink bloodwood in 1901, naming it Eucalyptus intermedia, and publishing the description in Proceedings of the Linnean Society of New South Wales. The species name is derived from the Latin adjective intermedius and is based on the intermediate nature of the oils between the red and yellow bloodwoods. In 1995, the genus Eucalyptus was split into three genera by Ken Hill and Lawrie Johnson, with E. intermedia transferred into Corymbia.

Hill and Johnson classified Corymbia intermedia in its own series Intermediae, A combined analysis of nuclear rDNA (ETS + ITS) and morphological characters published in 2009 found it to be closely related to C. trachyphloia and C. hendersonii. C. intermedia and other species were placed in the large section Septentrionales within the subgenus Corymbia. The common name comes from the gum veins in the wood.

== Distribution and habitat ==
The species is found in New South Wales from Gloucester northwards into Queensland, as far as to Cape York — a total range of 2,500 km (1,600 mi) — and within 100 km (62 mi) of the eastern coastline. It thrives on loamy and sandy soils, and has been found on altitudes of up to 1,200 metres (3,900 feet), with annual rainfall of 750–2200 mm and predominantly summer rain. It grows in open forest, or occasionally lone trees grow in closed forest or on the margins of rainforests. It is associated with such species as carbeen (Corymbia tesselaris), broad-leaved stringybark (Eucalyptus caliginosa), forest red gum (E. tereticornis), narrow-leaved ironbark (E. crebra), scribbly gum (E. racemosa), grey gum (E. propinqua), blackbutt (E. pilularis), flooded gum (E. grandis), red mahogany (E. resinifera), and black sheoak (Allocasuarina littoralis) and red wattle (Acacia flavescens) in coastal north Queensland.

== Ecology ==
In Bungawalbin National Park in northern New South Wales, the squirrel glider( Petaurus norfolcensis) has been observed biting and gouging into the bark to make a wound on the trunk of the pink bloodwood and then lick the sap out. The behaviour has also been recorded for the yellow-bellied glider (P. australis) for this species. Study of the forest habitat of the sugar glider (P. breviceps) and mahogany glider ( P. gracilis) found that the presence of pink bloodwood was correlated with the presence of the former and absence of the latter species.

Study of the impact of perioding burning in forest in southeastern Queensland found no significant difference in trunk diameter of pink bloodwoods in unburnt forest compared with forests burnt every two or four years.

== Uses ==
The dark pink to reddish-brown heartwood is hard and durable usable for building fences and bridges. The sawdust of pink bloodwood is an irritant to eyes and skin.
Corymbia intermedia may be used as a rootstock, onto which the ornamental Corymbia ficifolia is grafted.
