= Cooplacurripa Station =

Cattle station in New South Wales, Australia

Coordinates: 31.606°S 151.922°E

Location in New South Wales

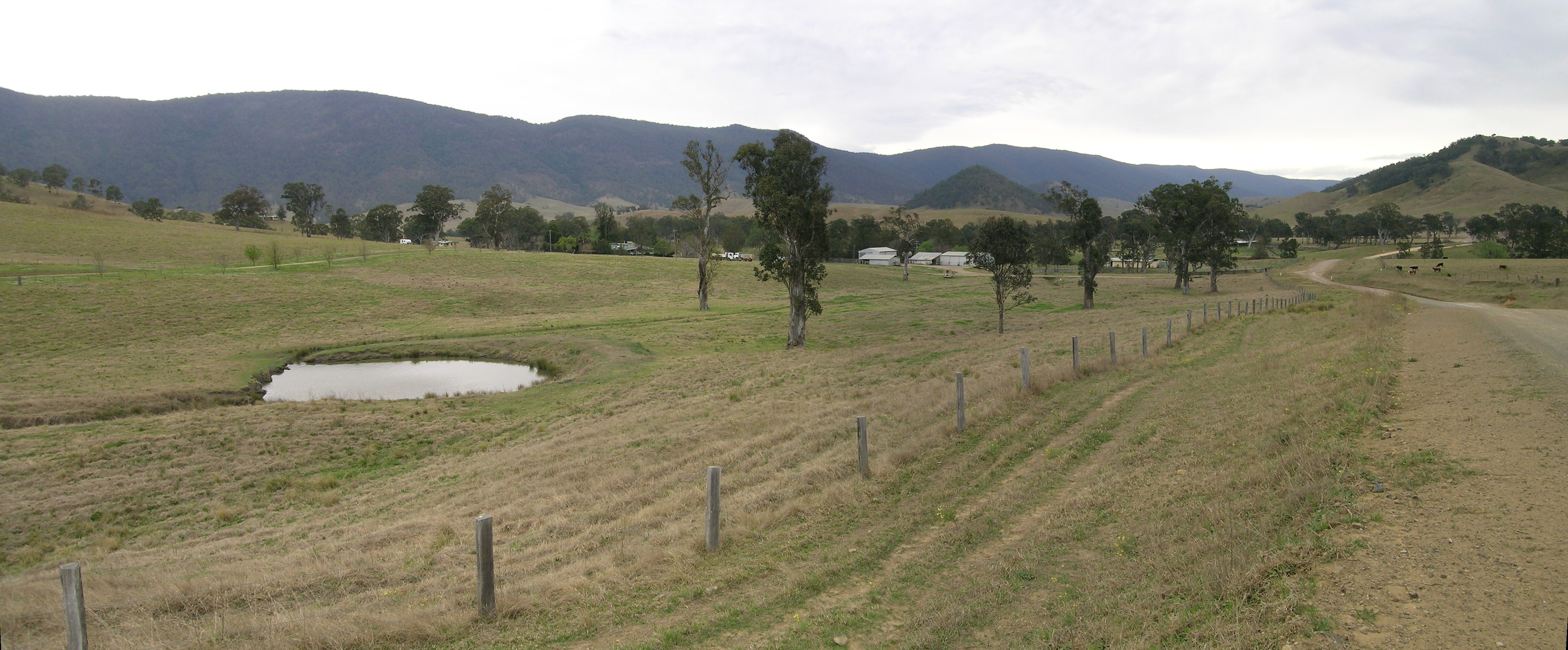
Cooplacurripa Station pastures

Cooplacurripa Station is a pastoral lease that operates as a cattle station in Cooplacurripa, New South Wales.

It is situated approximately 45 kilometres (28 mi) north of Gloucester and 74 kilometres (46 mi) west of Kendall. The Cooplacurripa River runs through the property, which is situated in a high rainfall valley area. It is one of the largest cattle stations on the eastern seaboard.

The Australian Agricultural Company has had links with the property dating back as far as 1846.

In 1950 the property was acquired by Ivan Norrie Livermore when it occupied an area of 32,000 hectares (79,074 acres). Over two years at a cost of 35,000 pounds he destroyed an estimated 500,000 rabbits; subsequently the property was soon able to support a herd of 10,000 cattle.

The 22,548-hectare (55,717-acre) property was acquired by the Bydand Pastoral Company in 2003. The deal also involved a lease from Bydand to Great Southern Group taking the stock and operating the land before being wound up and Bydand took back operations in 2008. The deal was worth A$18.5 million.

The Bydand Pastoral Company placed the property on the market in 2013 for leasing when the property had an estimated carrying capacity of 9,000 head of cattle. The herd is a mix of Angus and Hereford cattle. Some 70 investors applied to manage the property at a cost of an estimated A$1 million per year for a five-year lease. At the time the property had 11 cattle yards, extensive subdivision fencing, machinery and hay shed, cottages and the main homestead.

== See also ==
- List of ranches and stations
