= Cooplacurripa, New South Wales =

Cooplacurripa New South Wales
- Coordinates: 31°40′S 152°01′E
- Population: 12 (2016 census)
  - Density: 0.0293/km^{2} (0.076/sq mi)
- Established: 1857
- Postcode(s): 2424
- Area: 409.7 km^{2} (158.2 sq mi)
- Location: 42 km (26 mi) SE of Nowendoc; 88 km (55 mi) SE of Walcha; 141 km (88 mi) NNE of Newcastle; 256 km (159 mi) NE of Sydney
- LGA(s): Mid-Coast Council
- County: Hawes
Localities around Cooplacurripa:
Nowendoc	Bugan	Cells River
Baxter’s Ridge	Cooplacurripa	Dingo Forest
Bretti	Caffreys Flat	Wherrol Flat

Cooplacurripa is a small rural locality, located 40 kilometres from Nowendoc, New South Wales.

Cooplacurripa is home to the Cooplacurripa Station.

Cooplacurripa River, of the Manning River catchment, flows through the area.

In 2016, the population of Cooplacurripa was 12.

The area is accessible via Nowendoc Road, a 32 kilometre drive.
