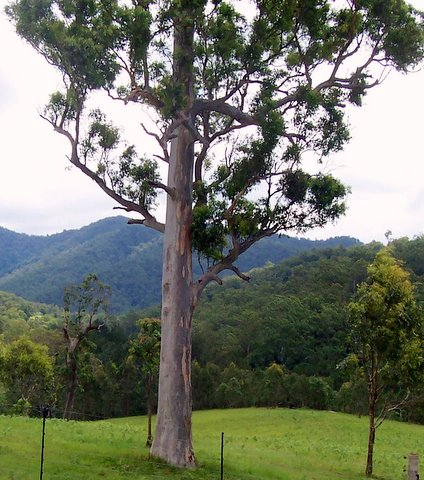
- Grey gum in the Ellenborough River valley

Scientific classification
- Kingdom: Plantae
- Clade: Tracheophytes
- Clade: Angiosperms
- Clade: Eudicots
- Clade: Rosids
- Order: Myrtales
- Family: Myrtaceae
- Genus: Eucalyptus
- Species: E. propinqua

Binomial name
- Eucalyptus propinqua Maiden & Deane

= Eucalyptus propinqua =

Grey gum

Species of eucalyptus

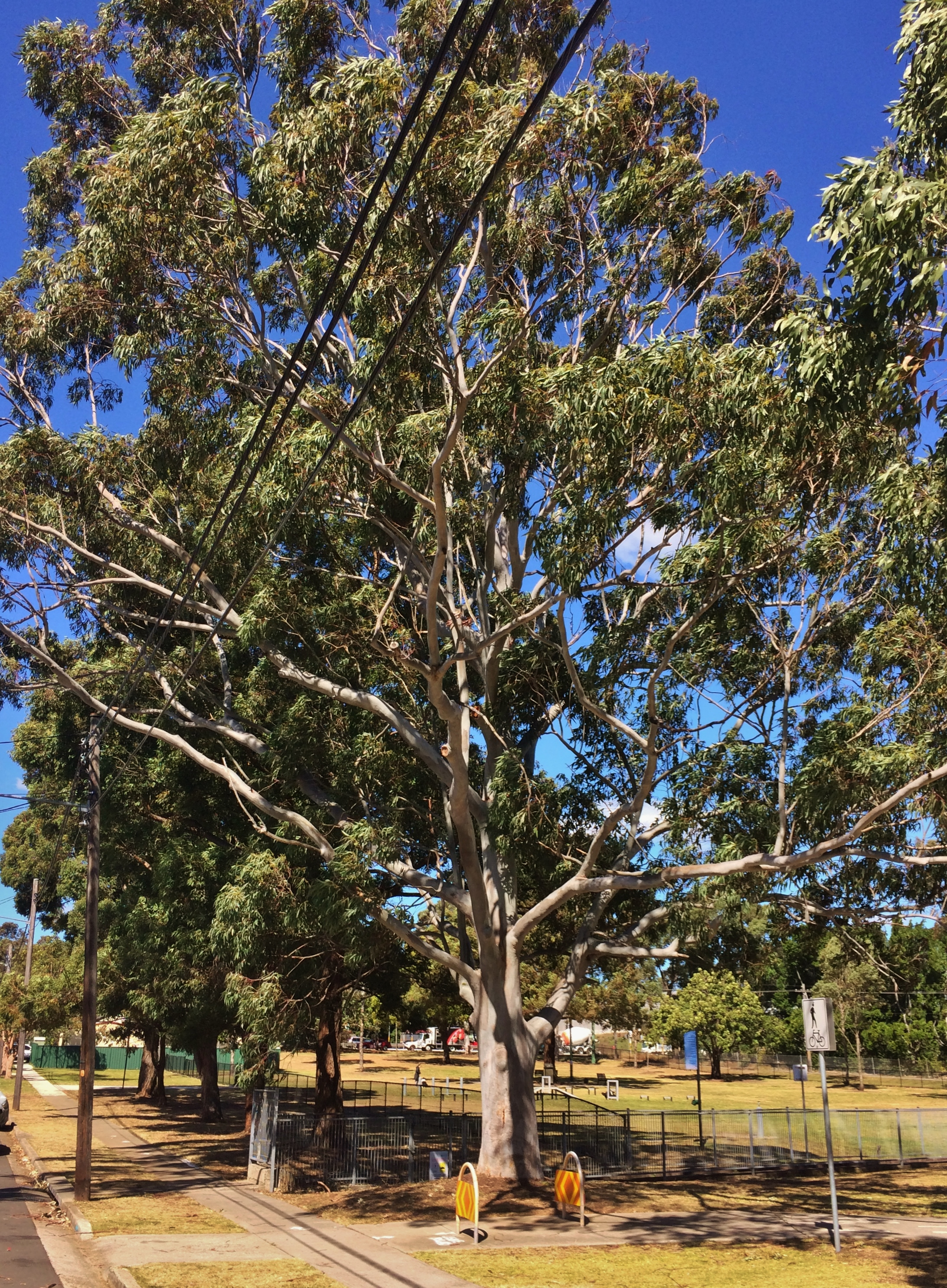
Mature specimen in Silverwater

Eucalyptus propinqua, commonly known as the grey gum or small-fruited grey gum, is a species of medium-sized to tall tree that is endemic to eastern Australia. It has smooth, mottled bark, lance-shaped to curved adult leaves that are paler on the lower surface, flower buds in groups of between seven and fifteen, white flowers and conical or hemispherical fruit.

== Description ==
Eucalyptus propinqua is a tree that typically grows to a height of 40 m (130 ft) and forms a lignotuber. It has smooth mottled grey, cream-coloured and yellowish bark that is shed in strips. Young plants and coppice regrowth have stems that are square in cross section and leaves that are a paler shade on the lower surface, 40–75 mm (1.6–3.0 in) long, 10–22 mm (0.39–0.87 in) wide and petiolate. Adult leaves are a paler shade of green on the lower side, lance-shaped to curved, 60–170 mm (2.4–6.7 in) long and 15–25 mm (0.59–0.98 in) wide, tapering to a petiole 10–22 mm (0.39–0.87 in) long. The flower buds are mostly arranged in leaf axils in groups of between seven and fifteen on an unbranched peduncle 5–15 mm (0.20–0.59 in) long, the individual buds on pedicels 1–5 mm (0.039–0.197 in) long. Mature buds are club-shaped to oval, 3–5 mm (0.12–0.20 in) long and about 3 mm (0.12 in) wide with a conical to rounded or beaked operculum. Flowering occurs from January to April and the flowers are white. The fruit is a woody, conical or hemispherical capsule 2–4 mm (0.079–0.157 in) long and 4–6 mm (0.16–0.24 in) wide with the valves strongly protruding.

== Taxonomy and naming ==
Eucalyptus propinqua was first formally described in 1896 by Joseph Maiden and Henry Deane in Proecceding of the Linnean Society of New South Wales. The specific epithet (propinqua) is from the Latin propinquus meaning "near", referring to the similarity of the bark to that of E. punctata.

== Distribution and habitat ==
Grey gum grows in open forest on low hills and ridges in coastal and near-coastal areas between Gympie in Queensland and the Hawkesbury River in New South Wales.

== Uses ==
=== Timber ===
The timber is very hard and heavy and is used for poles, piles, sleepers, heavy engineering construction, marine construction, flooring, and decking.

== Gallery ==
Features of the small-fruited grey gum (Eucalyptus propinqua)
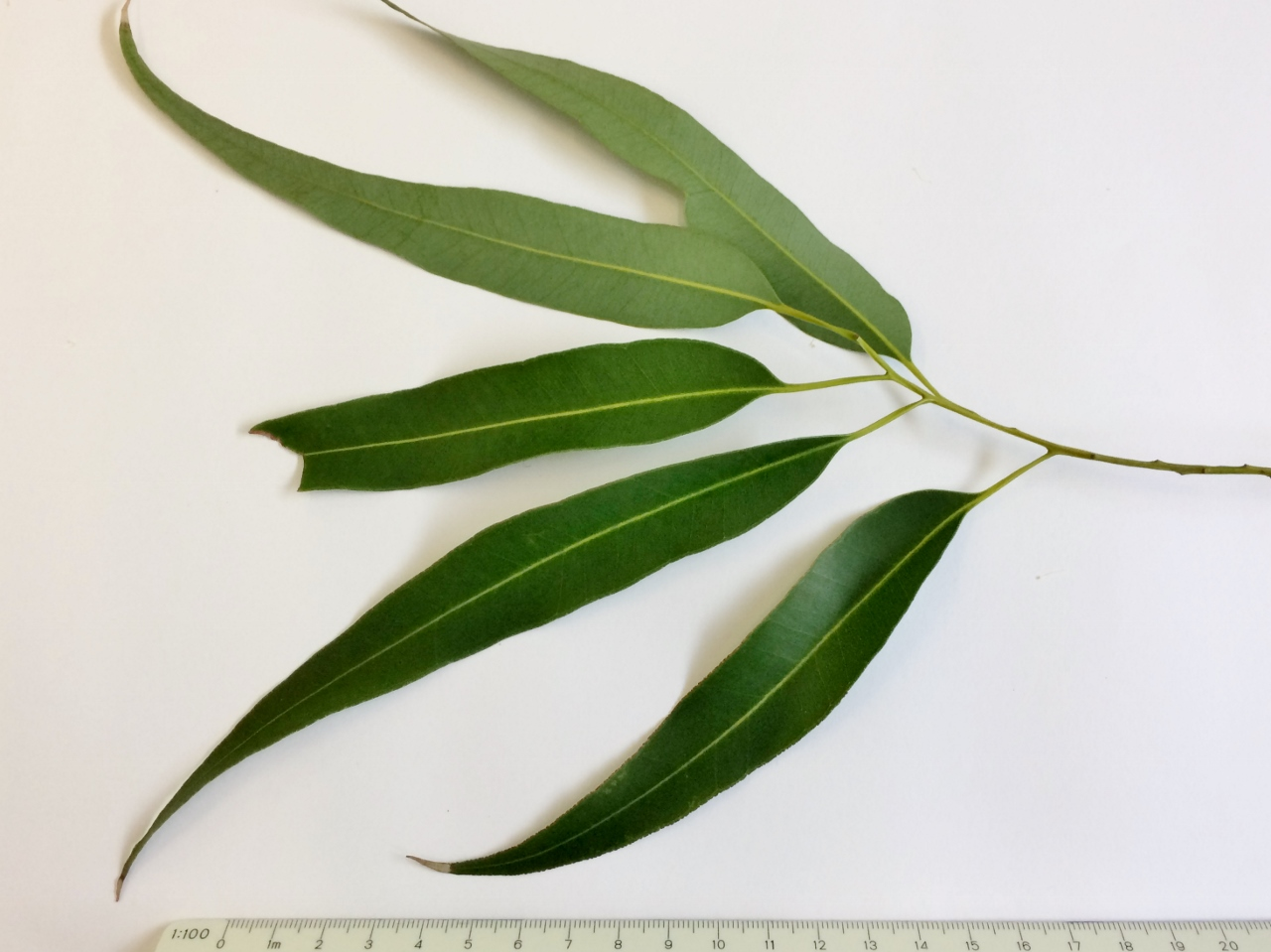
Adult leaves

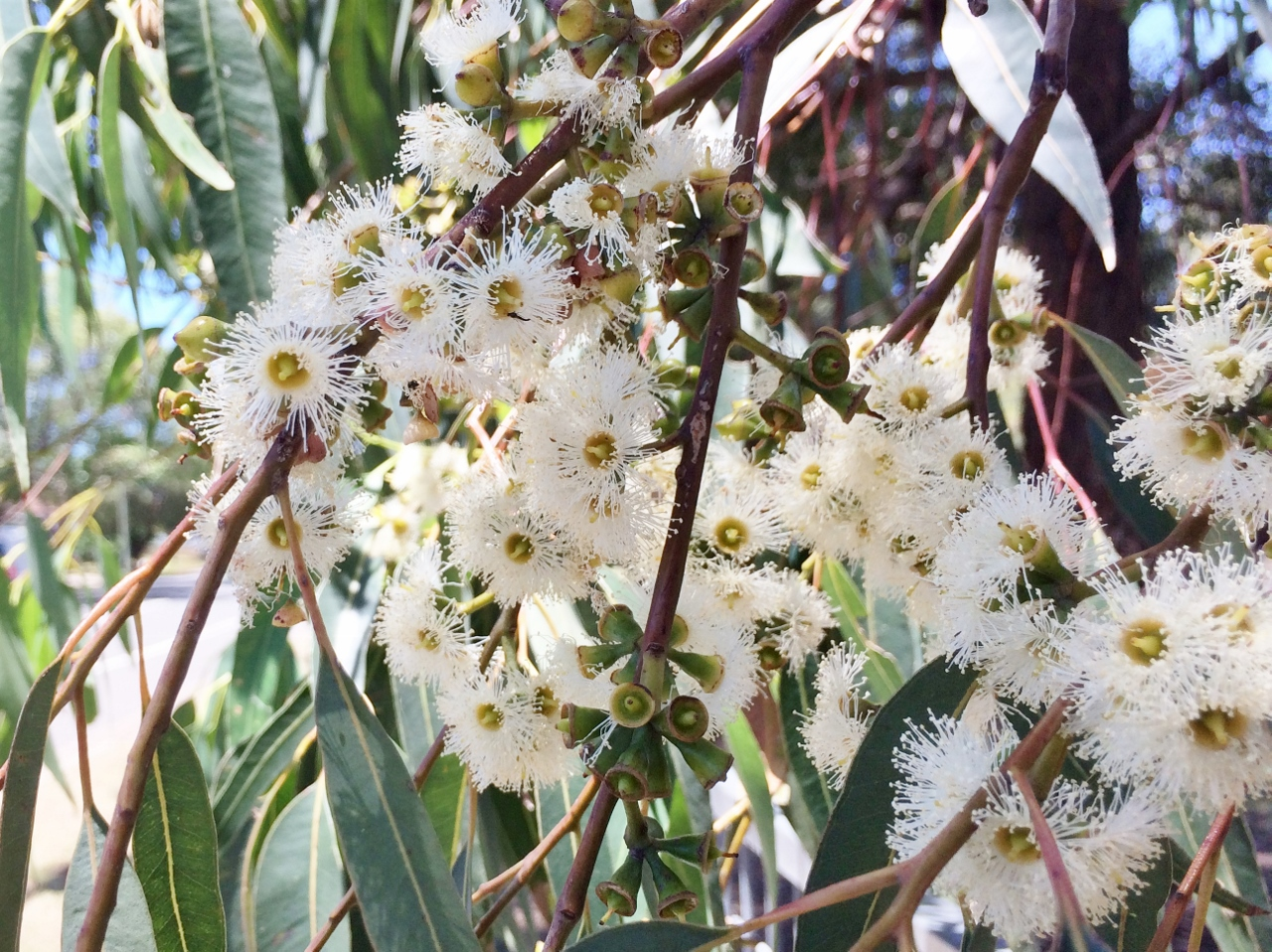
Flowers

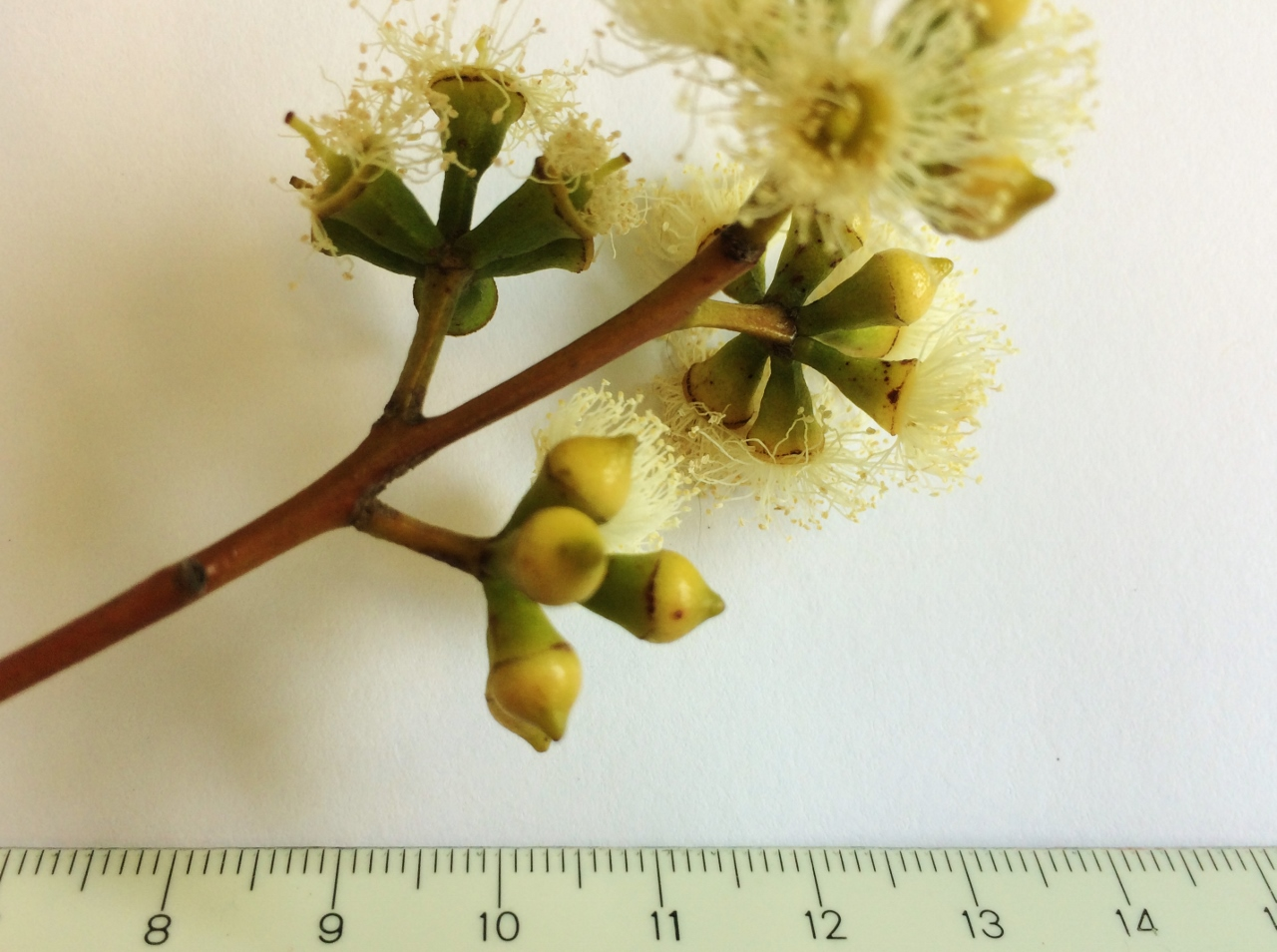
Inflorescence

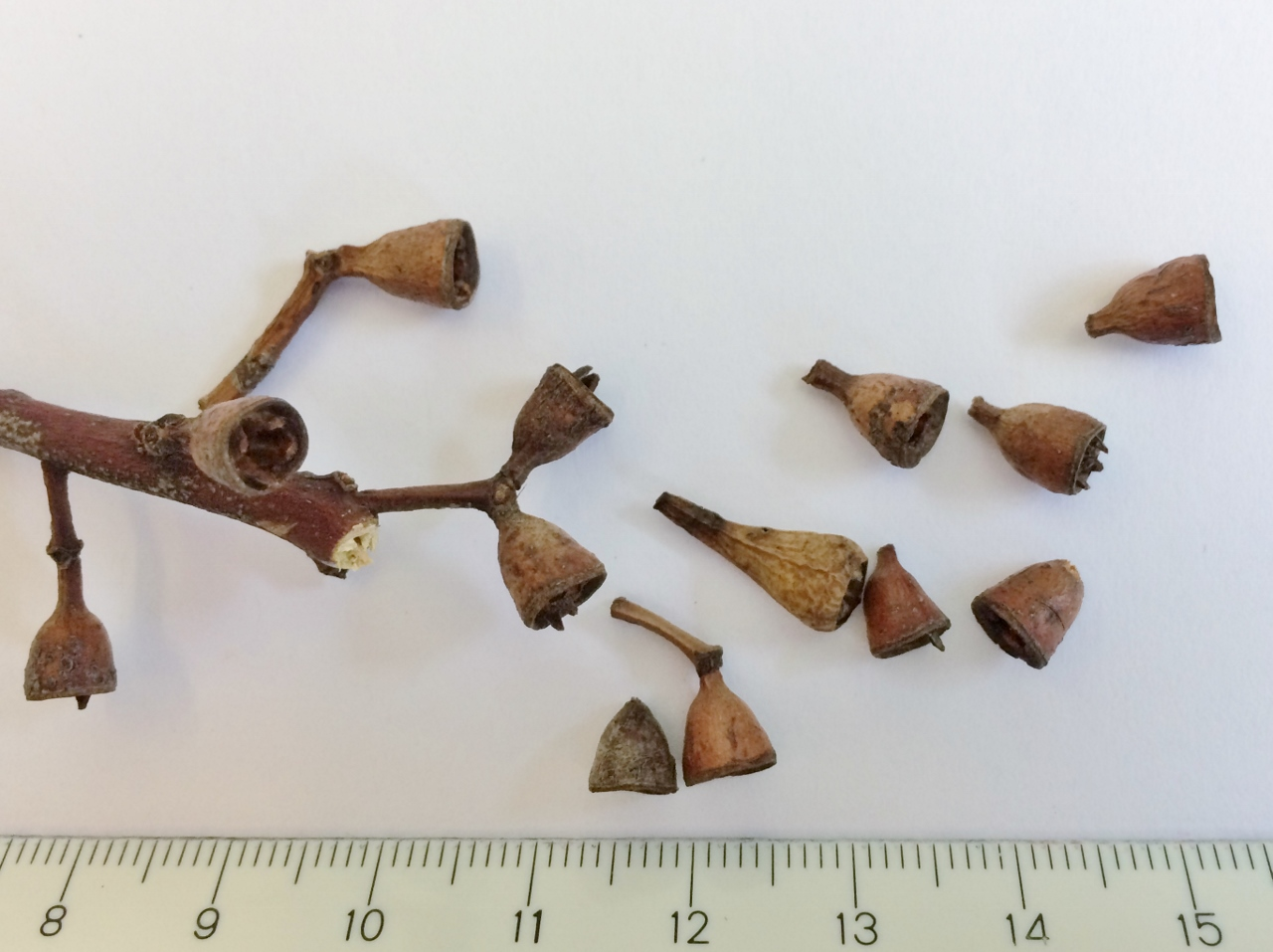
Fruit

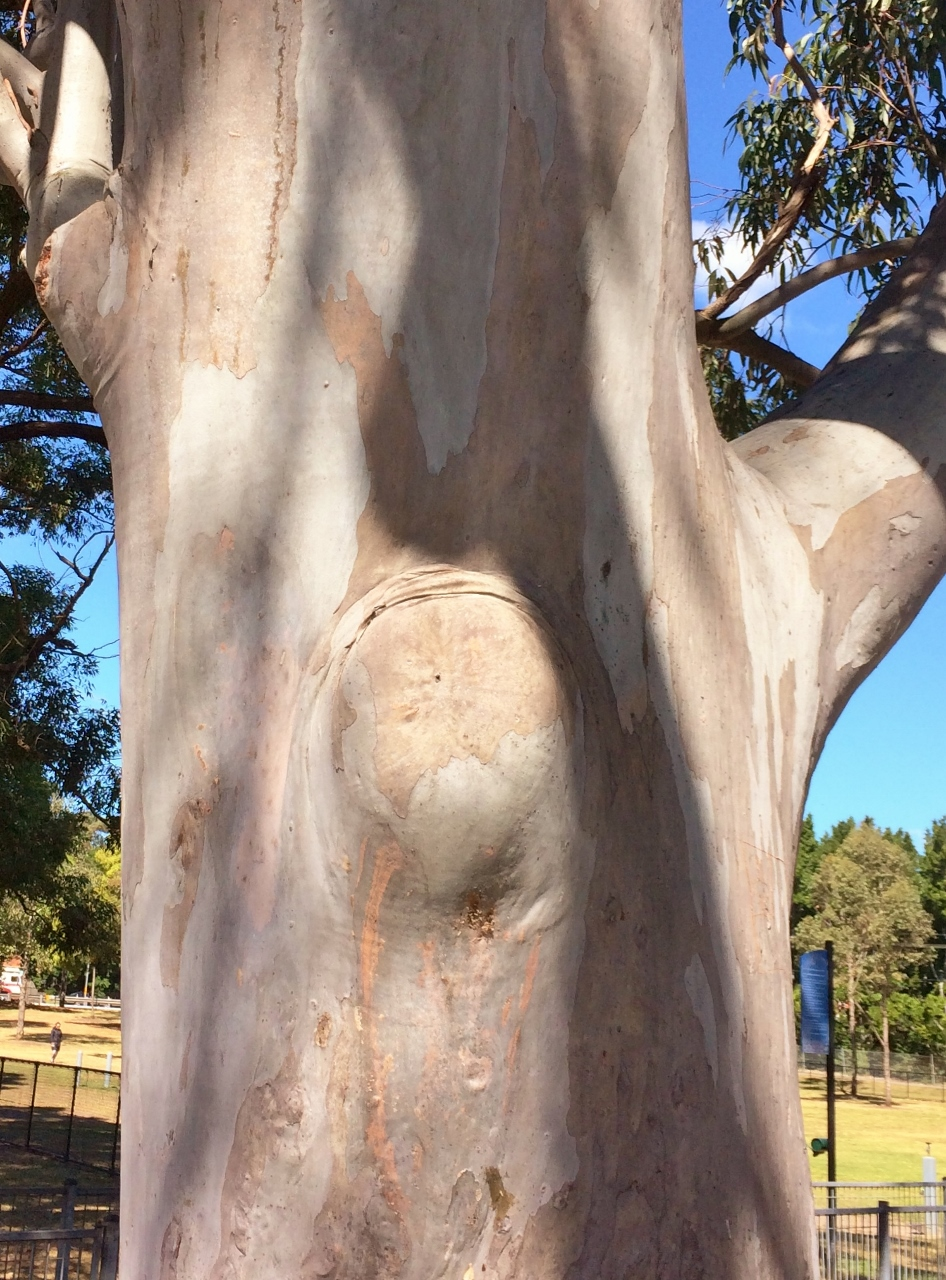
Trunk bark

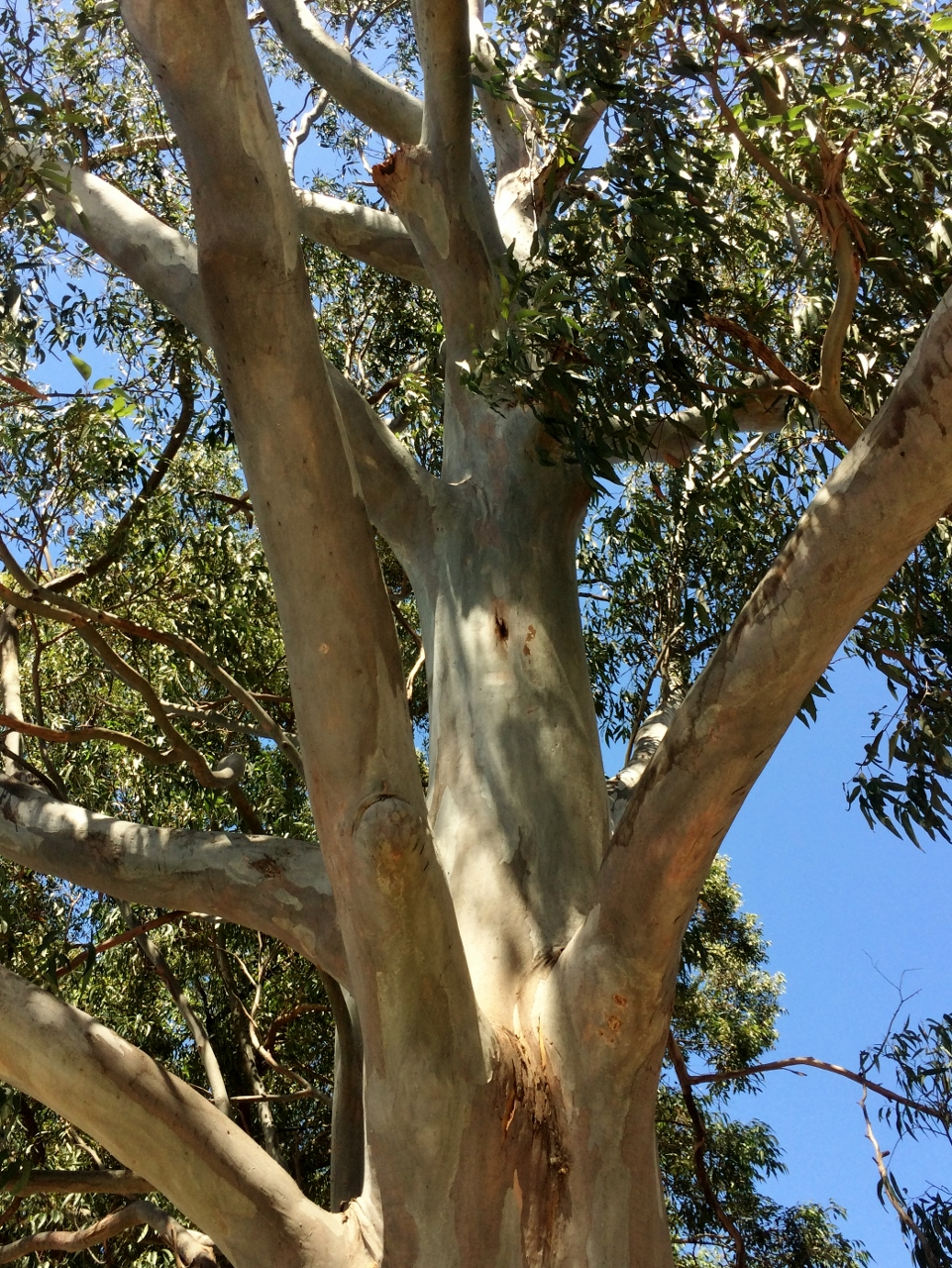
Upper branch bark
