= Flooded gum =

Flooded gum may refer to the following tree species:

- Eucalyptus grandis, from eastern Australia
- Eucalyptus rudis, from Western Australia
- Eucalyptus tereticornis, from eastern Australia and southern New Guinea
