= Eucalyptus biturbinata =

Grey gum

Scientific classification
- Kingdom: Plantae
- Clade: Tracheophytes
- Clade: Angiosperms
- Clade: Eudicots
- Clade: Rosids
- Order: Myrtales
- Family: Myrtaceae
- Genus: Eucalyptus
- Species: E. biturbinata

Binomial name
- Eucalyptus biturbinata L.A.S.Johnson & K.D.Hill

Species of eucalyptus

Eucalyptus biturbinata, commonly known as grey gum, is a tree native to New South Wales and Queensland in eastern Australia. It is regarded as a synonym of E. punctata by the Australian Plant Census.
