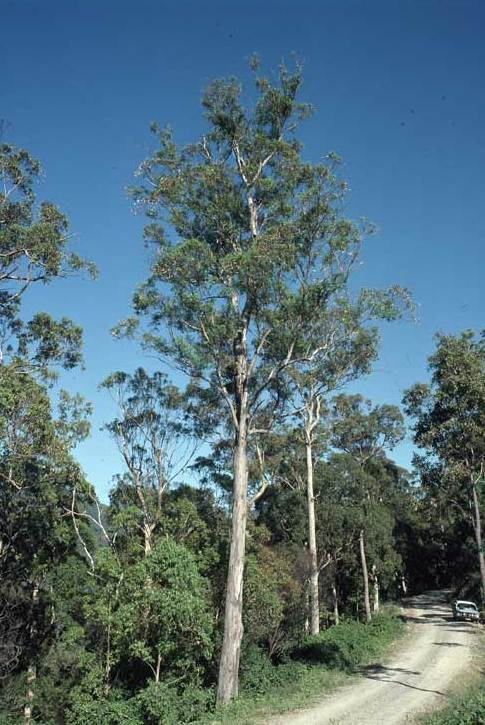

Conservation status
- Least Concern (IUCN 3.1)

Scientific classification
- Kingdom: Plantae
- Clade: Embryophytes
- Clade: Tracheophytes
- Clade: Spermatophytes
- Clade: Angiosperms
- Clade: Eudicots
- Clade: Rosids
- Order: Myrtales
- Family: Myrtaceae
- Genus: Eucalyptus
- Species: E. canaliculata

Binomial name
- Eucalyptus canaliculata Maiden

Synonyms
- Eucalyptus punctata var. grandiflora H.Deane & Maiden; Eucalyptus punctata var. major R.T.Baker & H.G.Sm.

= Eucalyptus canaliculata =

Grey gum

Species of eucalyptus

Eucalyptus canaliculata, commonly known as grey gum, is a tree endemic to a small area in New South Wales in eastern Australia. It has smooth, mostly grey bark, lance-shaped to curved adult leaves, flower buds in groups of seven, white flowers and conical or hemispherical fruit.

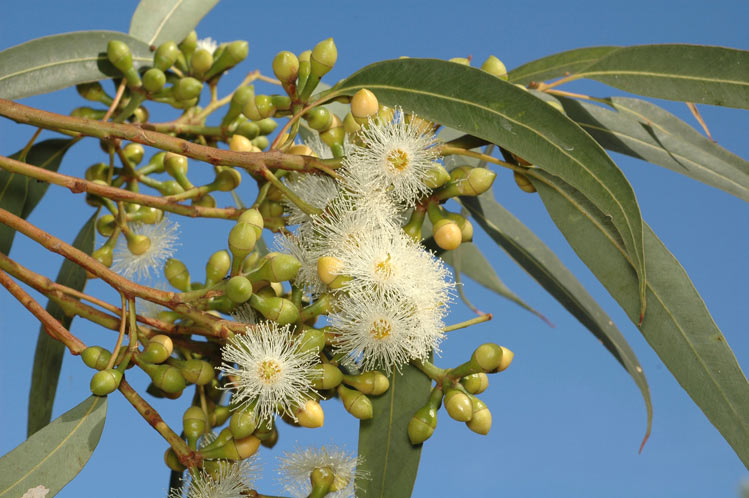
Flower buds and flowers

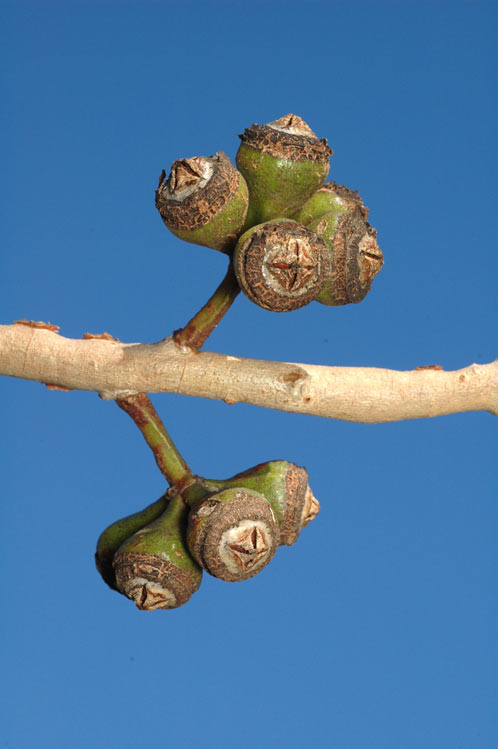
Fruit

== Description ==
Eucalyptus canaliculata is a tree that typically grows to a height of 30 metres (98 ft) and forms a lignotuber. It has smooth, mainly grey bark with patched of brown or pink and becomes granular with age. Young plants and coppice regrowth have lance-shaped to egg-shaped leaves 60–180 mm (2–7 in) long, 20–50 mm (0.8–2 in) wide, different shades of green on either side, and that always have a petiole. Adult leaves are a darker green on the upper surface, lance-shaped to curved, 80–170 mm (3–7 in) long, 15–50 mm (0.6–2 in) wide on a petiole 15–30 mm (0.6–1 in) long. The flower buds are arranged in groups of seven on a flattened peduncle 13–20 mm (0.5–0.8 in) long, the individual buds on a pedicel 5–8 mm (0.2–0.3 in) long. Mature buds are oval to diamond-shaped, 8–11 mm (0.31–0.43 in) long and 6–7 mm (0.24–0.28 in) wide with a conical to rounded operculum that is narrower than the floral cup. Flowering has been observed in February and the flowers are white. The fruit is a woody, conical or hemispherical capsule, 6–10 mm (0.24–0.39 in) long, 10–15 mm (0.39–0.59 in) wide and larger than other grey gums. The valves of the fruit extend well beyond the rim.

== Taxonomy and naming ==
Eucalyptus canaliculata was first formally described in 1921 by Joseph Maiden from a specimen near Dungog and the description was published in the Journal and Proceedings of the Royal Society of New South Wales. The specific epithet (canaliculatum) is a Latin word meaning "grooved", but the reason Maiden used this name is obscure.

== Distribution and habitat ==
Grey gum usually grows open forest in sites of medium to low fertility such as on dry ridge tops. It occurs in the foothills of coastal ranges near Dungog, Gloucester and Barrington Tops.
