= Acacia tabula =

Wombargo wattle

Scientific classification
- Kingdom: Plantae
- Clade: Tracheophytes
- Clade: Angiosperms
- Clade: Eudicots
- Clade: Rosids
- Order: Fabales
- Family: Fabaceae
- Subfamily: Caesalpinioideae
- Clade: Mimosoid clade
- Genus: Acacia
- Species: A. tabula

Binomial name
- Acacia tabula Molyneux & Forrester

Species of legume

Acacia tabula, commonly known as Wombargo wattle, is a species of Acacia of subgenus Phyllodineae that is endemic to north eastern Victoria, Australia.

== Description ==
The shrub typically grows to a height of 0.4 to 0.6 m (1 ft 4 in to 2 ft 0 in) and has glabrous branchlets not pruinose. Like most species of Acacia it has phyllodes rather than true leaves. The glabrous, thinly textured and evergreen phyllodes have an inequilaterally narrowly oblong to elliptic shape. The phyllodes are 6 to 14 mm (0.24 to 0.55 in) in length and 1 to 3.5 mm (0.039 to 0.138 in) in width with an obscure midrib and lateral nerves. It flowers between August and October, producing racemose inflorescences have small spherical flower-heads globular with a diameter of 2 to 2.5 mm (0.079 to 0.098 in) containing five to eight golden colored flowers. Acacia Tabula having these flowers make it a part of the magnoliophyta phylum.

== Distribution ==
It has a limited distribution from around Splitters Creek to the south of Wulgulmerang where it is usually a part of open dry forest communities growing in shallow soils that are derived from sediments. It is often associated from Acacia infecunda and Acacia nanopravissima. It is restricted to a small population in the upper catchment Little River which flows into the Snowy River on the Wombargo Range in as a group of small fragmented stands that are relatively close to each other.

== Where is Acacia tabula found? ==
Acacia tabula is a rare species of plant, it is only native to one part of Australia, which is Victoria, Australia. Because Acacia tabula isn't commonly found it is known as an endangered species. Acacia tabula can be found in dry and rocky areas.

== How does Acacia Tabula reproduce? ==
Tabula Acacia is under the genus Acacia, which is a part of the seed plant group, more specifically phylum magnoliophyta. Because Tabula Acacia is a part of the magnoliophyta phylum, like all plants it reproduces through alternation of generations. Because of being a part of magnoliophyta, it has seed dispersal at the zygote stage of its lifecycle. Being an angiosperm and given the types of flowers that grow on Acacia tabula, it is also a monoecious species.

== See also ==
- List of Acacia species
