= Bonang River =

Bonang Tellicura, Sliprail
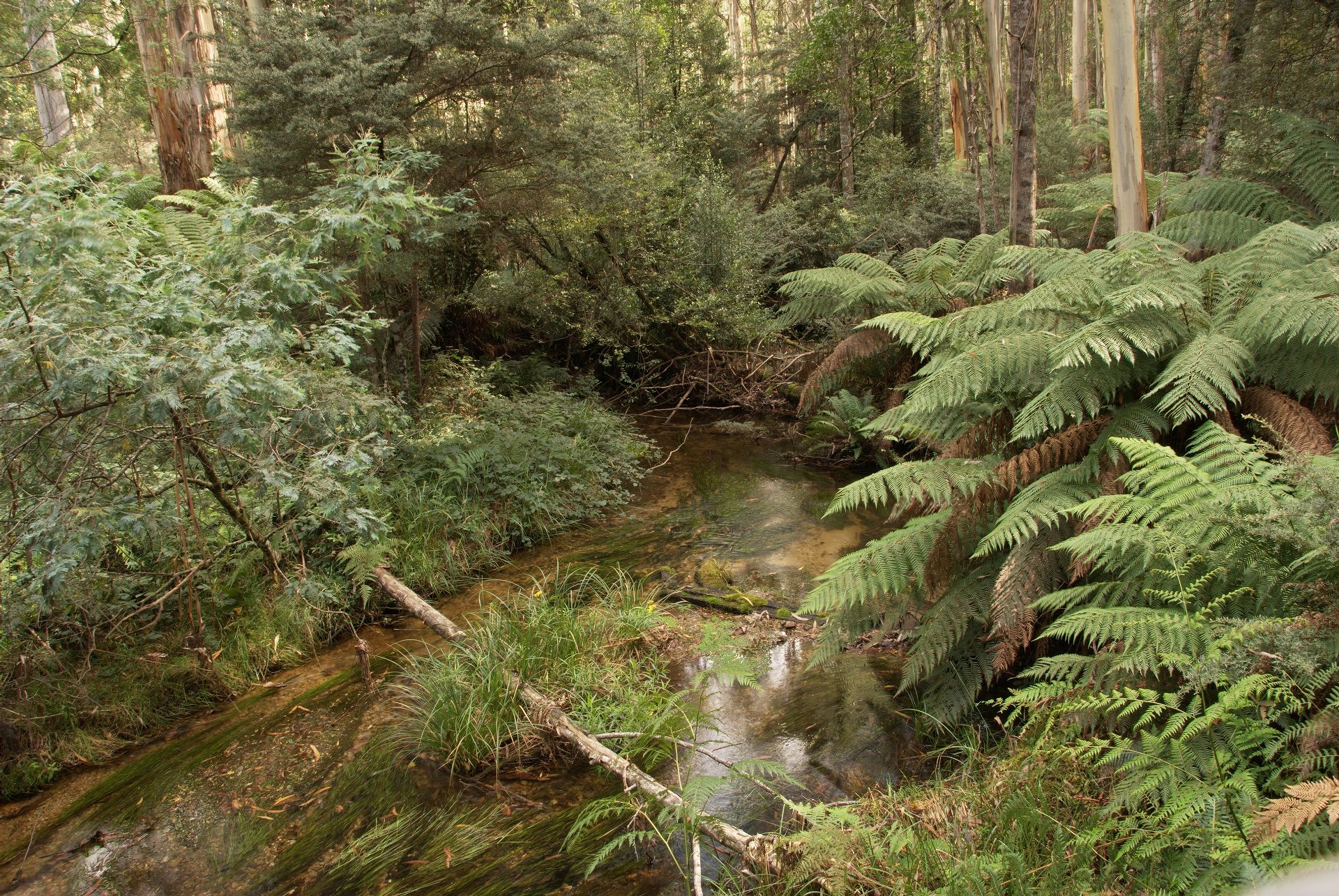
- River and forest near Bendoc Orbost Road

- Mouth of the Bonang River in Victoria

Location
- Country: Australia
- State: Victoria
- Region: Australian Alps (IBRA), Victorian Alps, East Gippsland
- Local government area: Shire of East Gippsland

Physical characteristics
- Source: Bonang River North Branch
  - location: Snowy River National Park
- Source confluence: Bonang River South Branch
  - location: below Mountain Little Bill
  - elevation: 767 m (2,516 ft)
- Mouth: confluence with the Deddick River
  - location: south of the Black-Allan Line
  - coordinates: 37°6′18″S 148°38′27″E
  - elevation: 503 m (1,650 ft)
- Length: 30 km (19 mi)

Basin features
- River system: Snowy River catchment
- National park: Snowy River NP

The Bonang River is a perennial river of the Snowy River catchment, in the Alpine region of the Australian state of Victoria.

== Course and features ==
Formed by the confluence of the northern and southern branches of the river, the Bonang River rises below Mountain Little Bill in a remote alpine wilderness area within the Snowy River National Park, near The Gap Scenic Reserve. The river flows generally north, leaving the national park, then northwest, and then west, joined by six minor tributaries, before reaching its confluence with the Deddick River in the Victorian State Forestry country, below Mount Rosendale in the Shire of East Gippsland, south of the Black-Allan Line that forms part of the border between Victoria and New South Wales. The river descends 264 metres (866 ft) over its 30-kilometre (19 mi) course.

In its upper reaches, the river is traversed by Bonang Road, north of the road's junction with McKillops Road.

== History ==
=== Aboriginal history ===
The traditional custodians of the land surrounding the Bonang River are the Australian Aboriginal Bidawal and Nindi-Ngudjam Ngarigu Monero peoples.

== See also ==
- List of rivers of Australia
