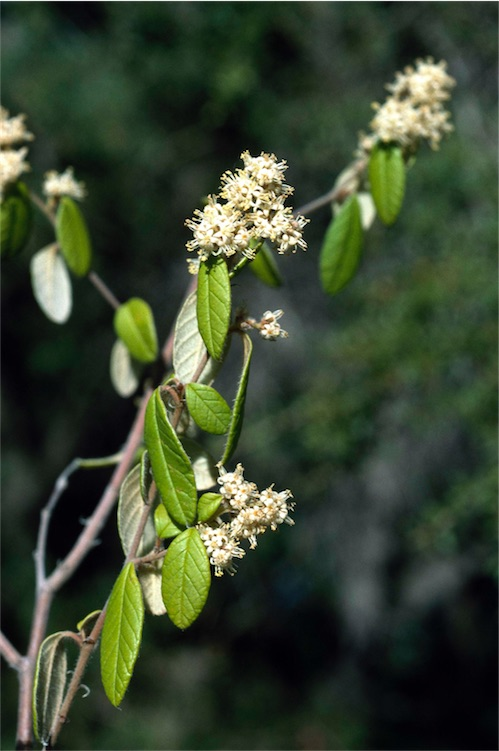
- Pomaderris brunnea in the ANBG

Conservation status
- Vulnerable (EPBC Act)

Scientific classification
- Kingdom: Plantae
- Clade: Tracheophytes
- Clade: Angiosperms
- Clade: Eudicots
- Clade: Rosids
- Order: Rosales
- Family: Rhamnaceae
- Genus: Pomaderris
- Species: P. brunnea

Binomial name
- Pomaderris brunnea N.A.Wakef.

= Pomaderris brunnea =

Species of shrub

Pomaderris brunnea, commonly known as rufous pomaderris, is a species of flowering plant in the family Rhamnaceae and is endemic to south-eastern Australia. It is a shrub with hairy stems, elliptic to lance-shaped leaves with the narrower end towards the base, and dense panicles of yellowish flowers.

== Description ==
Pomaderris brunnea is a shrub that typically grows to a height of 2–3 m (6 ft 7 in – 9 ft 10 in), its branchlets covered with brownish and woolly white hairs. The leaves are elliptic to lance-shaped with the narrower end towards the base, 20–40 mm (0.79–1.57 in) long and 8–15 mm (0.31–0.59 in) wide with stipules 4–5 mm (0.16–0.20 in) long at the base. The edges of the leaves are more or less toothed, the upper surface dark green with valleys above the veins, the lower surface densely covered with brownish and woolly white hairs. The flowers are borne in dense, pyramid-shaped panicles 30–50 mm (1.2–2.0 in) long, and are yellowish, each flower on a pedicel about 0.5–1 mm (0.020–0.039 in) long. The floral cup is 0.6–0.8 mm (0.024–0.031 in) long, the sepals 1.5–1.7 mm (0.059–0.067 in) long but fall off as the flower opens and there are no petals. Flowering occurs in October and the fruit is a capsule covered with long rusty hairs.

== Taxonomy ==
Pomaderris brunnea was first formally described in 1951 by Norman Arthur Wakefield in The Victorian Naturalist from specimens collected by William Blakely, near the Hawkesbury River, on the edge of the salt water, in 1918. The specific epithet (brunnea) means "brown".

== Distribution and habitat ==
Rufous pomaderris grows in moist woodland or forest and in sheltered river and creek banks. It is known from sixteen populations in the Sydney area, the North Coast and the New England Tableland, and from two populations near the junction of the Rodger and Snowy Rivers in eastern Victoria.

== Conservation status ==
Pomaderris brunnea is listed as "vulnerable" under the Australian Government Environment Protection and Biodiversity Conservation Act 1999, and as "endangered" under the New South Wales Government Biodiversity Conservation Act 2016.
