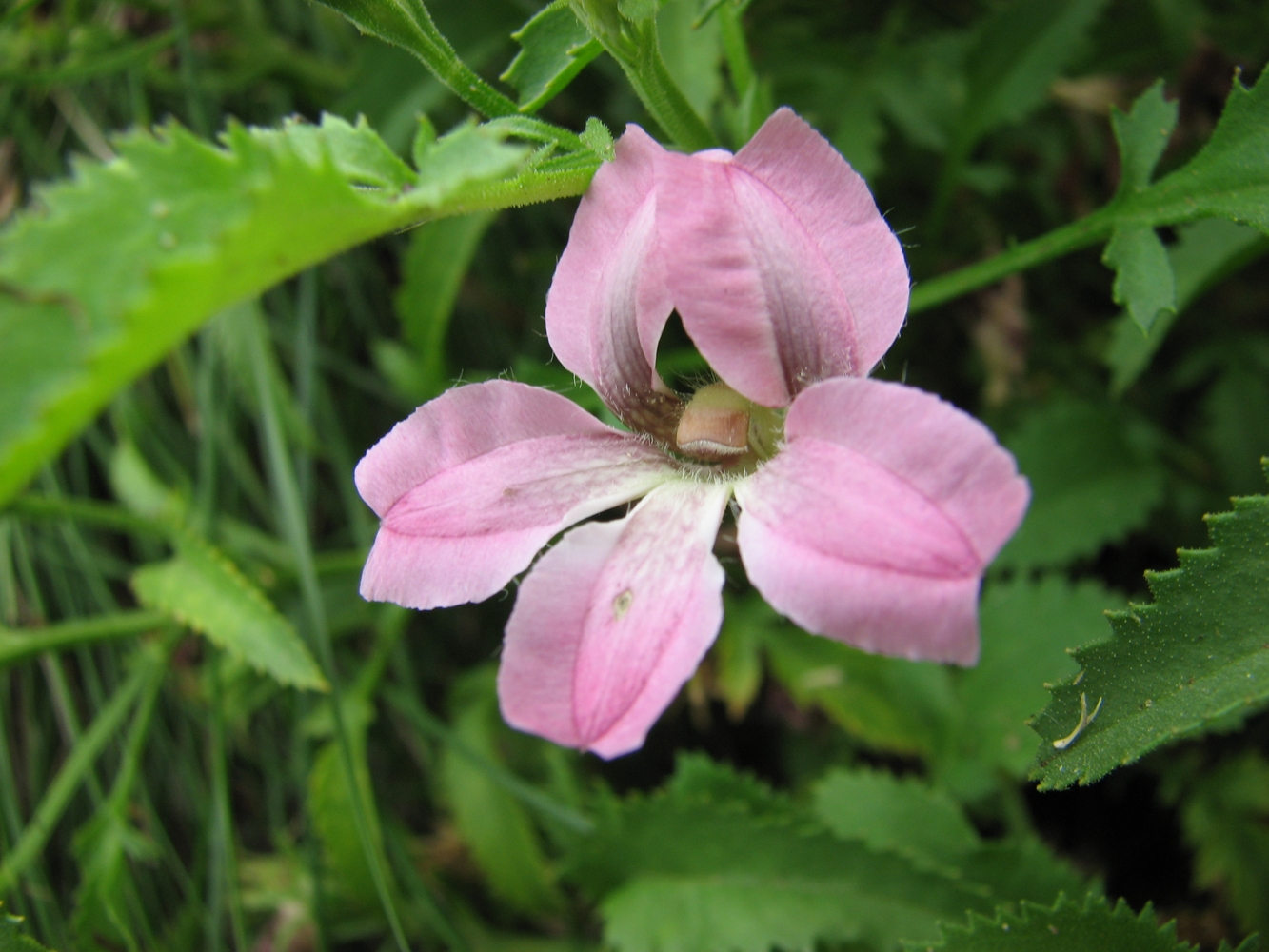

Scientific classification
- Kingdom: Plantae
- Clade: Tracheophytes
- Clade: Angiosperms
- Clade: Eudicots
- Clade: Asterids
- Order: Asterales
- Family: Goodeniaceae
- Genus: Goodenia
- Species: G. macmillanii

Binomial name
- Goodenia macmillanii F.Muell.

Synonyms
- Goodenia grandiflora var. macmillanii (F.Muell.) K.Krause

= Goodenia macmillanii =

Species of flowering plant

Goodenia macmillanii, commonly known as pinnate goodenia, is a species of flowering plant in the family Goodeniaceae and is endemic to Victoria, Australia. It is an erect, short-lived perennial shrub with lyrate or lobed leaves, egg-shaped to elliptic in outline with toothed edges, and leafy racemes of bluish-purple flowers.

== Description ==
Goodenia macmillanii is an erect, short-lived perennial shrub that typically grows to a height of 50 cm (20 in). The leaves are lyrate or lobed, egg-shaped to elliptic in outline with toothed edges, 40–80 mm (1.6–3.1 in) long and 20–50 mm (0.79–1.97 in) wide on a petiole 15–21 mm (0.59–0.83 in) long. The flowers are arranged in leafy racemes up to 200 mm (7.9 in) long on a peduncle up to 10 mm (0.39 in) long, with linear bracteoles about 2 mm (0.079 in) long, each flower on a pedicel 15–21 mm (0.59–0.83 in) long. The sepals are lance-shaped, 6–8 mm (0.24–0.31 in) long, the petals bluish-purple 18–22 mm (0.71–0.87 in) long. The lower lobes of the corolla are 9–10 mm (0.35–0.39 in) long with wings 2–2.5 mm (0.079–0.098 in) wide. Flowering mainly occurs from November to February and the fruit is a cylindrical to oval capsule 10–12 mm (0.39–0.47 in) long.

== Taxonomy ==
Goodenia macmillanii was first formally described by Victorian Government Botanist Ferdinand von Mueller in 1859 in Fragmenta Phytographiae Australiae, from specimens collected near the "McAllister River". The specific epithet (macmillanii) honours Gippsland pioneer and explorer Angus McMillan.

== Distribution and habitat ==
Pinnate goodenia grows on rocky slopes in the valleys of the Macalister, Snowy and Deddick Rivers.

== Conservation status ==
The species is listed as "vulnerable" on the Department of Sustainability and Environment's Advisory List of Rare Or Threatened Plants In Victoria.

== Use in horticulture ==
The species may be grown in shade or sun, and is somewhat drought tolerant though it performs best in moist situations. It can withstand light to moderate frosts and prefers a sandy loam although it may be grown in rocky or clay-based soils. It may also be grown as a container plant in standard potting mix. Plants may be propagated by division.
