= Yalmy River =

Yalmy Broadbent Creek
- Mouth of the Yalmy River in Victoria

Location
- Country: Australia
- State: Victoria
- Region: Australian Alps (IBRA), Victorian Alps, East Gippsland
- LGA: Shire of East Gippsland

Physical characteristics
- Source: Yalmy State Forest
  - location: Snowy River National Park
  - elevation: 476 m (1,562 ft)
- Mouth: confluence with the Rodger River
  - location: east of Hicks campsite
  - coordinates: 37°24′42″S 148°23′21″E
  - elevation: 161 m (528 ft)
- Length: 28 km (17 mi)

Basin features
- River system: Snowy River catchment
- Tributaries
  - left: Little Yalmy River, Serpentine Creek, Cavender Creek
- National park: Snowy River NP

The Yalmy River is a perennial river of the Snowy River catchment, in the Alpine region of the Australian state of Victoria.

== Course and features ==
The Yalmy River rises in a valley in a remote alpine wilderness area that forms the boundary between the Snowy River National Park and the Yalmy State Forest, and flows generally south, then west, then south, then south by west, joined by three minor tributaries, before reaching its confluence with the Rodger River east of Hicks camp site within the national park in the Shire of East Gippsland. The river descends 315 metres (1,033 ft) over its 28-kilometre (17 mi) course.

The entire course of the river is contained within, or forms the eastern boundary of the Snowy River National Park.

The traditional custodians of the land surrounding the Yalmy River are the Aboriginal Bidawal and Nindi-Ngudjam Ngarigu Monero peoples.

== See also ==
- List of rivers of Australia
