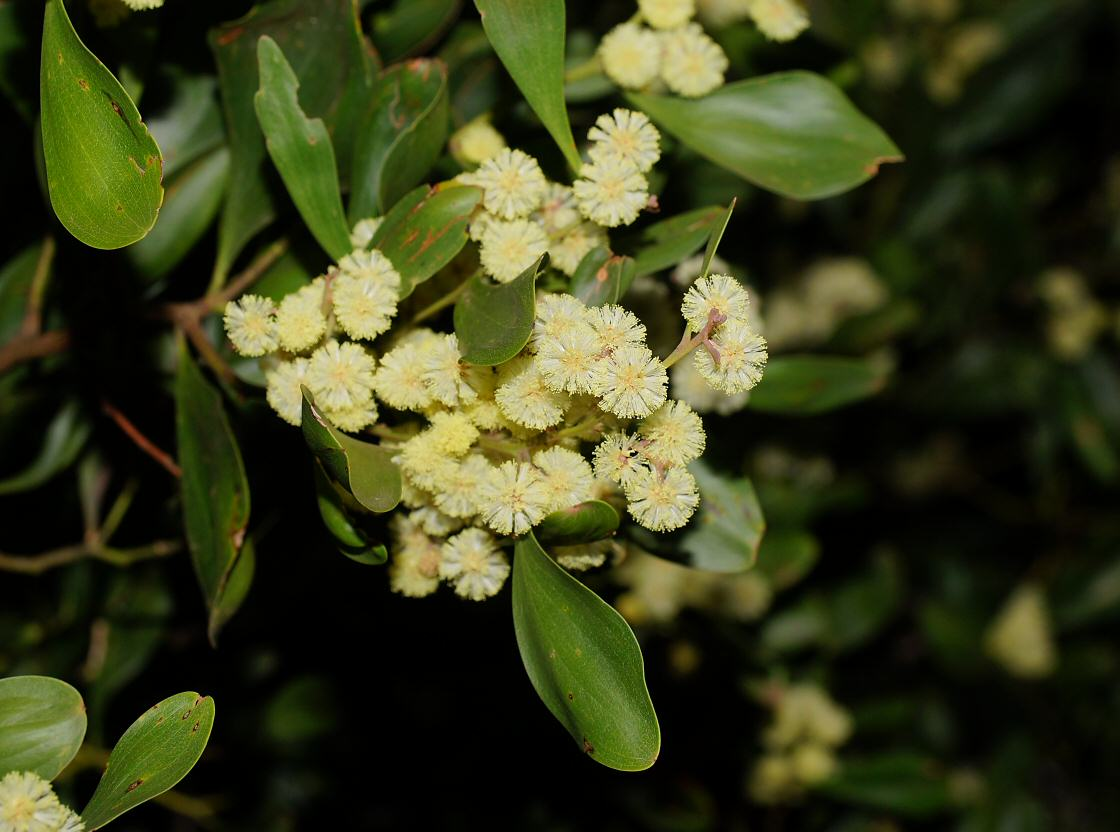

Scientific classification
- Kingdom: Plantae
- Clade: Tracheophytes
- Clade: Angiosperms
- Clade: Eudicots
- Clade: Rosids
- Order: Fabales
- Family: Fabaceae
- Subfamily: Caesalpinioideae
- Clade: Mimosoid clade
- Genus: Acacia
- Species: A. frigescens

Binomial name
- Acacia frigescens J.H.Willis
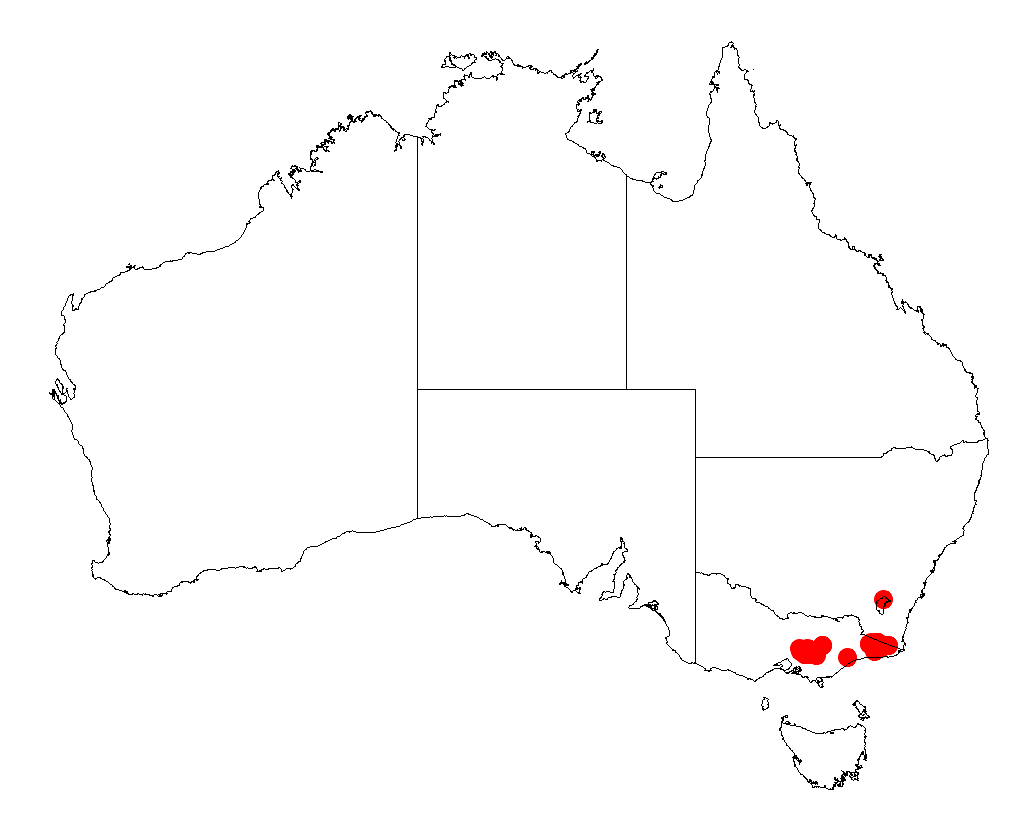
- Occurrence data from AVH

Synonyms
- Racosperma frigescens (J.H.Willis) Pedley

= Acacia frigescens =

Montane wattle

Species of legume

Acacia frigescens, commonly known as montane wattle, frosted wattle or forest wattle is a species of flowering plant in the family Fabaceae and is endemic to Victoria, Australia. It is a shrub or tree with glabrous branchlets, narrowly elliptic to lance-shaped phyllodes with the narrower end towards the base, spherical heads of pale yellow to bright yellow flowers and linear pods raised over the seeds.

== Description ==
Acacia frigescens is a shrub or tree that typically grows to a height of 3–15 m (9.8–49.2 ft), sometimes to 25 m (82 ft) and has rather smooth bark and glabrous branchlets. Its phyllodes are narrowly elliptic to lance-shaped with the narrower end towards the base, straight, 70–160 mm (2.8–6.3 in) long and 15–50 mm (0.59–1.97 in) wide with three to five main veins. The flowers are borne in two to five spherical heads in glabrous, resinous racemes 6–17 mm (0.24–0.67 in) on peduncles 5–10 mm (0.20–0.39 in) long. Each head is 6–7 mm (0.24–0.28 in) in diameter with about 30 pale yellow to bright yellow flowers. Flowering mostly occurs from September to November, and the pods are linear, more or less straight, up to 100 mm (3.9 in) long, 5–8 mm (0.20–0.31 in) wide, glabrous, crusty to leathery and raised over the seeds. The seeds are oblong, 4–5 mm (0.16–0.20 in) long and shiny black with a white aril folded beneath the seed.

== Taxonomy ==
Acacia frigescens was first formally described in 1957 by the botanist James Hamlyn Willis in The Victorian Naturalist from specimens collected near Result Creek, near Bonang in 1940.

== Distribution and habitat ==
Montane wattle grows in the understorey of tall, open Eucalyptus forest in subalpine and montane areas from the north east of Melbourne to around Mount Coopracambra in the east Gippsland region of Victoria.

== See also ==
- List of Acacia species
