= Little Yalmy River =

Little Yalmy
- Mouth of the Little Yalmy River in Victoria

Location
- Country: Australia
- State: Victoria
- Region: Australian Alps (IBRA), Victorian Alps, East Gippsland
- LGA: Shire of East Gippsland

Physical characteristics
- Source: Mount Jersey
  - location: Yalmy State Forest
  - elevation: 823 m (2,700 ft)
- Mouth: confluence with the Yalmy River
  - location: Snowy River National Park
  - coordinates: 37°22′57″S 148°28′25″E
  - elevation: 243 m (797 ft)
- Length: 22 km (14 mi)

Basin features
- River system: Snowy River catchment
- National park: Snowy River NP

The Little Yalmy River is a perennial river of the Snowy River catchment, in the Alpine region of the Australian state of Victoria.

== Course and features ==
The Little Yalmy River rises below Mount Jersey in the Yalmy State Forest in a remote alpine wilderness area and flows generally south, then southwest, then south by west, before reaching its confluence with the Yalmy River within the Snowy River National Park in the Shire of East Gippsland. The river descends 581 metres (1,906 ft) over its 22-kilometre (14 mi) course.

The traditional custodians of the land surrounding the Little Yalmy River are the Australian Aboriginal Bidawal and Nindi-Ngudjam Ngarigu Monero peoples.

== See also ==
- List of rivers of Australia
