= Deddick River =

River in Victoria, Australia

Deddick
- Mouth of the Deddick River in Victoria

Location
- Country: Australia
- State: Victoria
- Region: Australian Alps (IBRA), Victorian Alps, East Gippsland
- Local government area: Shire of East Gippsland
- Locality: Tubbut

Physical characteristics
- Source: Mount Little Bill
  - location: Snowy River National Park
  - elevation: 868 m (2,848 ft)
- Mouth: confluence with the Snowy River
  - location: below Mount Bulla Bulla
  - coordinates: 37°5′S 148°25′E
  - elevation: 175 m (574 ft)
- Length: 60 km (37 mi)

Basin features
- River system: Snowy River catchment
- National park: Snowy River NP

The Deddick River is a perennial river of the Snowy River catchment, in the Alpine region of the Australian state of Victoria.

== Course and features ==
The Deddick River rises below Mount Little Bill in a remote alpine wilderness area within the Snowy River National Park, and flows generally north, leaving the national park, then northwest through the locality of Tubbut, and then west-southwest. The river is joined by the Bonang River and sixteen minor tributaries, before reaching its confluence with the Snowy River in the Snowy River National Park below Mount Bulla Bulla, a few hundred metres north of the McKillops Bridge in the Shire of East Gippsland. The river descends 693 metres (2,274 ft) over its 60-kilometre (37 mi) course.

McKillops Road is located adjacent to much of the course of the river, and traverses the river on several occasions.

The traditional custodians of the land surrounding the Deddick River are the Australian Aboriginal Bidawal and Nindi-Ngudjam Ngarigu Monero peoples.

== See also ==
- List of rivers of Australia
