= Carl Walter =

Australian botanist and photographer

Carl Walter (c. 1831 – 7 October 1907), also known as Charles Walter, was an Australian botanist and photographer. He was born in Mecklenburg, Germany in about 1831 and arrived in Victoria in the 1850s.

== Botanical work ==
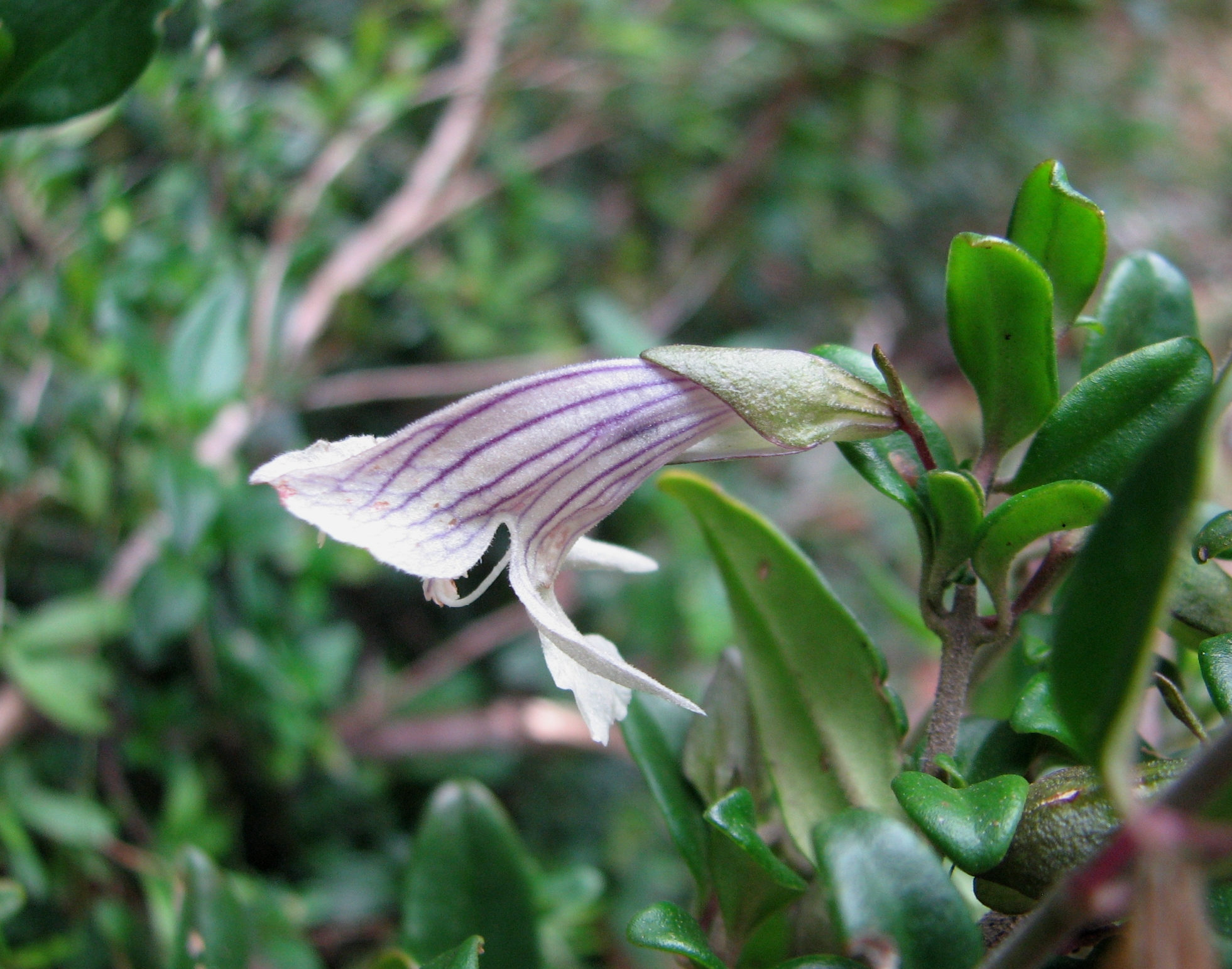
Prostanthera walteri

Walter discovered and collected a new species of mint bush on Mount Ellery which was named in his honour as Prostanthera walteri by Victorian Government Botanist Ferdinand von Mueller in 1870 . It is thought that Walter accompanied the geodetic survey team headed by Government Astronomer Robert L. J. Ellery which surveyed East Gippsland and the border with New South Wales from 1869 to 1871.

He collected plants on behalf of Anatole von Hügel and was accompanied by missionary George Brown in exploring the Bismarck Archipelago in 1875.

In 1889, Walter collected the type specimen of Eucalyptus x brevirostris in the Upper Yarra region in 1889.

During the 1890s, Walter collected plant specimens in the Australian Alps, accompanied by Charles French junior.

From the 1890s until his death in 1907, Walter was head of economic botany at the Technological Museum in Melbourne.

In 1906, Walter described a new subspecies of the orchid Diuris punctata in The Victorian Naturalist, based on plant material collected at Mount Arapiles by St. Eloy D'Alton. He named it Diuris puncata var. d'Altoni, subsequently revised to daltoni.

== Photography ==
Walter set up a photographic studio at 45 Bell Street, Fitzroy, Melbourne, promoting himself as a "Country Photographic Artist" or "Landscape Photographic Artist" and many of his images were reproduced as woodcuts in contemporary journals. As early as 1865 he submitted a report on the "Salmon Tanks in Badger Creek" to the Illustrated Australian News. For a twenty-year period starting from about 1862, he would periodically travel to eastern and alpine regions of Victoria with camera equipment and camping gear in a backpack; "the whole weighing about fifty pounds.”

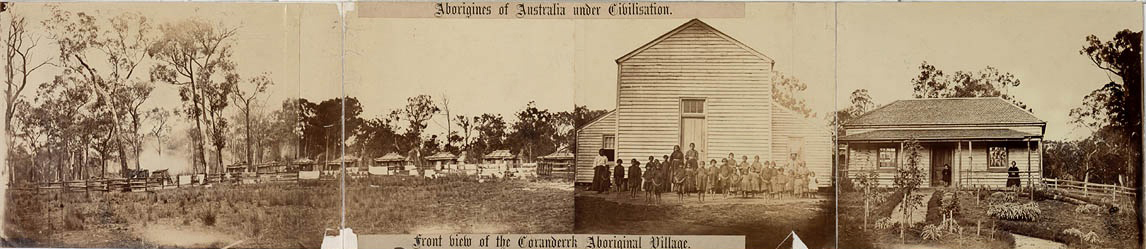
Corranderrk Aboriginal Reserve, Victoria, 1865

Much of his early endeavors revolved around documenting portraits of indigenous people and capturing the mission stations of Ramahyuck (Lake Wellington), Coranderrk (Yarra Flats) where he made 106 photographs, and Lake Tyers. In 1867, he dispatched portraits of Victoria's aboriginals to the Anthropological Society of London, where they were exhibited at the Intercolonial Exhibition of Australasia in Melbourne in 1866-67.

Walter advertised in 1871 "an extensive collection of Stereoscopic Views depicting Aboriginal Life, Mining, Scenery, and other Australian Subjects." He predominantly employed a stereoscopic camera but also produced some half-plate and whole-plate negatives, most officially registered his photographs with the Victorian Copyright Office in 1870. The earliest surviving photograph by Walter bears the date 1862, and his work continued to be published until the early 1870s.

== Pictorial works ==
- Corranderrk Aboriginal Village, 1865 / photographed by Charles Walter State Library of NSW
- The Lighthouse, Twofold Bay, N.S.W., between 1872-1975 / photographer C. Walter State Library of NSW
