= Acacia infecunda =

Famine wattle

Scientific classification
- Kingdom: Plantae
- Clade: Embryophytes
- Clade: Tracheophytes
- Clade: Spermatophytes
- Clade: Angiosperms
- Clade: Eudicots
- Clade: Rosids
- Order: Fabales
- Family: Fabaceae
- Subfamily: Caesalpinioideae
- Clade: Mimosoid clade
- Genus: Acacia
- Species: A. infecunda

Binomial name
- Acacia infecunda Molyneux & Forrester

Synonyms
- Acacia infecunda Maslin nom. inval.; Acacia sp. Splitters Creek 1 (W.Molyneux 30 Apr. 1986) Vic. Herbarium; Acacia sp. aff. boormanii (Wulgulmerang)

Species of legume

Acacia infecunda, also known as famine wattle, is a species of flowering plant in the family Fabaceae and is endemic to a restricted part of East Gippsland in Victoria, Australia. It is an erect shrub that readily forms suckers, and has linear, straight phyllodes and spherical heads of golden yellow flowers.

== Description ==
Acacia infecunda is an erect shrub that typically grows to a height of 30–60 cm (12–24 in) and readily forms suckers. Its branchlets are glabrous and the phyllodes are linear, straight and flat, 12–41 mm (0.47–1.61 in) long, 0.8–2.2 mm (0.031–0.087 in) wide, glabrous and greyish green. The midrib is not prominent and the lateral veins are absent. The flowers are brone in eight to ten spherical heads on peduncles 1.5–4 mm (0.059–0.157 in) long, each head 3–5 mm (0.12–0.20 in) in diameter with five to nine golden yellow flowers. pods and seeds have not been seen.

== Taxonomy ==
The species was first formally described in 2008 by Bill Molyneux and Susan G. Forrester in the journal Muelleria from specimens collected by the authors in the Benambra - Limestone Road in 1995. It is closely related to Acacia boormanii which is much taller. The specific epithet (infecunda) refers to the apparent infecund nature of the species, compared to the closely related A. boormanii.

== Distribution ==
Famine wattle has a limited distribution in north-western Victoria to the south of Wulgulmerang around Splitters Creek on high rocky ground in dry open forest where it grows in rocky soils. Only a single small population of fragmented stands growing in a limited area on the Wombargo Range in the headwaters of the Little River.

== See also ==
- List of Acacia species
