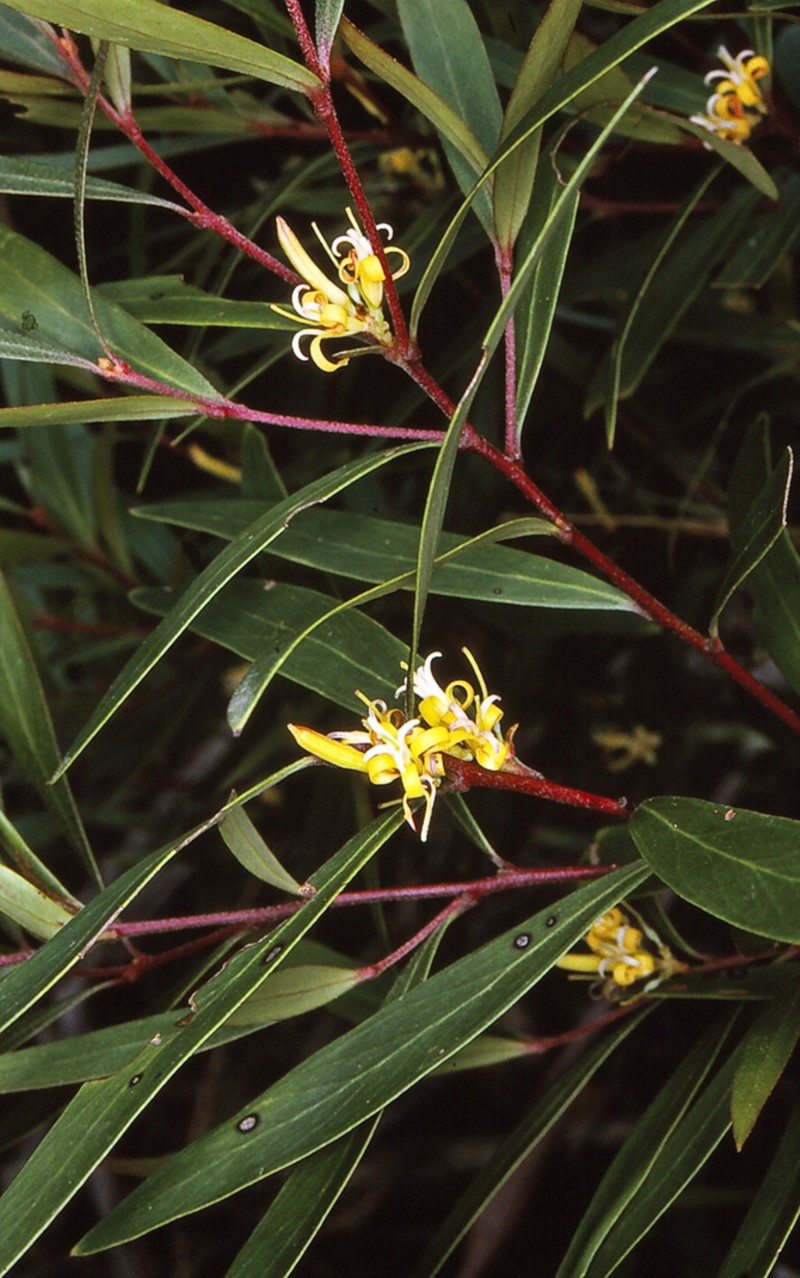
- Persoonia silvatica growing near Tantawangalo

Scientific classification
- Kingdom: Plantae
- Clade: Tracheophytes
- Clade: Angiosperms
- Clade: Eudicots
- Order: Proteales
- Family: Proteaceae
- Genus: Persoonia
- Species: P. silvatica

Binomial name
- Persoonia silvatica L.A.S.Johnson

= Persoonia silvatica =

Forest geebung

Species of flowering plant

Persoonia silvatica, commonly known as the forest geebung, is a plant in the family Proteaceae and is endemic to south-eastern Australia. It is a shrub or tree with more or less lance-shaped leaves and small groups of yellow flowers with white centres. It grows mainly in forest near the border between New South Wales and Victoria.

== Description ==
Persoonia silvatica is a shrub or small tree which grows to a height of 1.5–9 m (5–30 ft) with its young branches having a sparse covering of hair. The leaves are arranged alternately and are 30–120 mm (1–5 in) long and 6–25 mm (0.2–1 in) wide. They are narrow elliptic to lance-shaped, or narrow spatula-shaped to lance-shaped with the narrower end towards the base. They are flat and smooth, the upper surface a darker colour than the lower one, and the leaves are hairy when young but become glabrous as they age. The flowers are arranged in groups called racemes in leaf axils, or on the ends of branches, and some of the groups continue to grow into leafy shoots. Each flower is on a pedicel 1–4 mm (0.04–0.2 in) long which is sometimes hairy. The flower is composed of four yellow tepals 12–14 mm (0.5–0.6 in) long, which are fused at the base but with the tips rolled back. There is a spine up to 1.5 mm (0.06 in) long on the end of each tepal. The central style is surrounded by four white anthers which are also joined at the base with the tips rolled back, so that they resemble a cross when viewed end-on. The ovary at the base of the style is glabrous. Flowering occurs in summer and is followed by fruit which are green, oval-shaped drupes about 15 mm (0.6 in) long and 12 mm (0.5 in) wide.

== Taxonomy and naming ==
Persoonia silvatica was first formally described in 1957 by botanist Lawrie Johnson based on plant material collected at Brown Mountain in New South Wales by Ernst Betche in 1893. The specific epithet (silvatica) is a Latin word meaning "of woods".

== Distribution and habitat ==
Persoonia silvatica occurs in montane forest along the Great Dividing Range in East Gippsland and south-eastern New South Wales including localities Bendoc, the Errinundra Plateau, Mount Kaye and Howe Hill in Victoria and Monga, Tinderry Peak and Mount Currockbilly in New South Wales. Plants that are believed to be hybrids of this species with Persoonia confertiflora have been noted at Genoa in Victoria.

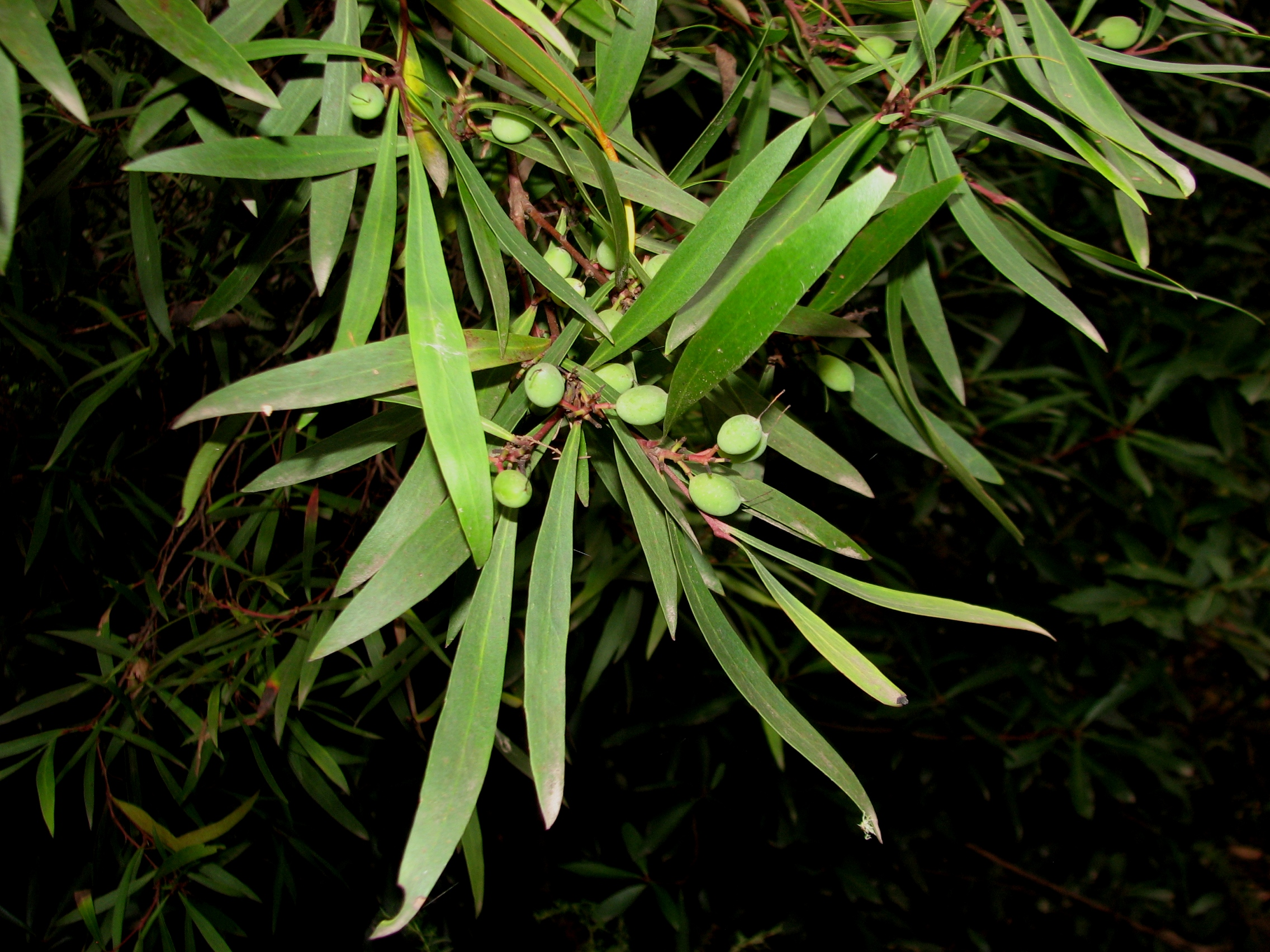
Leaves and fruit
Errinundra National Park

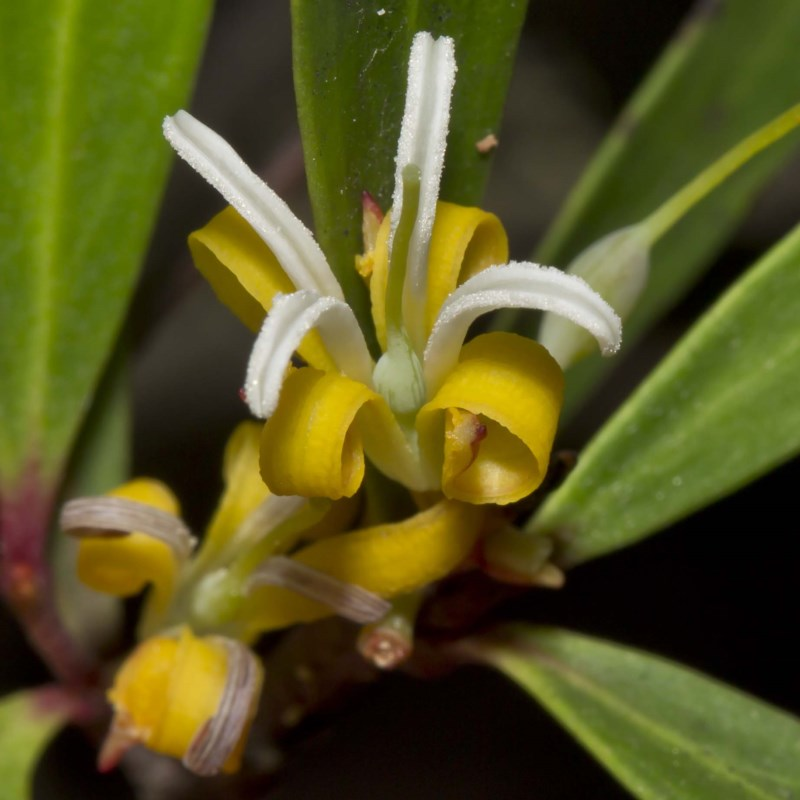
Flower detail
