= Rodger River =

Rodger Bodger, Roger Creek, Roger
- Mouth of the Rodger River in Victoria

Location
- Country: Australia
- State: Victoria
- Region: Australian Alps (IBRA), Victorian Alps, East Gippsland
- Local government area: Shire of East Gippsland

Physical characteristics
- Source: Monkeytop
  - location: Snowy River National Park
  - elevation: 806 m (2,644 ft)
- Mouth: confluence with the Snowy River
  - location: south of Jackson Crossing
  - coordinates: 37°25′17″S 148°19′11″E
  - elevation: 61 m (200 ft)
- Length: 60 km (37 mi)

Basin features
- River system: Snowy River catchment
- Tributaries
  - left: Yalmy River, Wrong Creek, Cattle Creek (Victoria), Black Snake Creek
- National park: Snowy River NP

The Rodger River is a perennial river of the Snowy River catchment, in the Alpine region of the Australian state of Victoria.

== Course and features ==
The Rodger River rises below Monkeytop in a remote alpine wilderness area within the Snowy River National Park, and flows generally south, then west, then south, then south by west, joined by the Yalmy River and three minor tributaries, before reaching its confluence with the Snowy River downstream of Jackson Crossing in the Shire of East Gippsland. The river descends 744 metres (2,441 ft) over its 60-kilometre (37 mi) course.

The entire course of the river is contained within Snowy River National Park.

The traditional custodians of the land surrounding the Rodger River are the Australian Aboriginal Bidawal and Nindi-Ngudjam Ngarigu Monero peoples.

== See also ==
- List of rivers of Australia
