= Acacia nanopravissima =

Little kooka wattle

Scientific classification
- Kingdom: Plantae
- Clade: Tracheophytes
- Clade: Angiosperms
- Clade: Eudicots
- Clade: Rosids
- Order: Fabales
- Family: Fabaceae
- Subfamily: Caesalpinioideae
- Clade: Mimosoid clade
- Genus: Acacia
- Species: A. nanopravissima

Binomial name
- Acacia nanopravissima Molyneux & Forrester

Species of legume

Acacia nanopravissima, also known as little kooka wattle, is a species of flowering plant in the family Fabaceae, and is only known from the type location in Victoria. It is an erect shrub that readily forms suckers, and has glabrous branchlets, crowded phyllodes and spherical heads of golden yellow flowers. Its pods and seeds have not been seen.

== Description ==
Acacia nanopravissima is a small, erect shrub that typically grows to a height of about 40–60 cm (16–24 in), 25–40 cm (9.8–15.7 in) wide with glabrous branchlets, and readily forms suckers. Its phyllodes have very unequal sides, 3–8 mm (0.12–0.31 in) long, 4–8 mm (0.16–0.31 in) wide and generally Δ-shaped, the lower edge conspicuously rounded and greyish green. There is a prominent gland mostly 2.3–3.7 mm (0.091–0.146 in) above the pulvinus. The flowers are borne in six to ten spherical heads in racemes 12–27 mm (0.47–1.06 in) long on peduncles 2–4 mm (0.079–0.157 in) long, each head with seven to nine golden yellow flowers. Flowering occurs from late August to early October, but the pods and seeds have not been seen.

== Taxonomy ==
Acacia nanopravissima was first formally described in 2008 by Bill Molyneux and Susan G. Forrester in the journal Muelleria from specimens they collected near the Benambra-Limestone Road in 1993. The specific epithet (nanopravissima) refers to the species being smaller in all its parts to the closely related A. pravissima.

== Distribution and habitat ==
Little kooka wattle grows in dry woodland and heathland on rocky soils derived from rhyolite and is apparently endemic to the Wulgulmerang district in East Gippsland, where it is currently known from a single small population on the Wombargo Range near Splitters Creek, in the upper catchment of the Little River in north-eastern Victoria.

== See also ==
- List of Acacia species
