= Mount Bulla Bulla =

Mountain in Victoria, Australia

- Location within Shire of Mansfield

Highest point
- Elevation: 906 m (2,972 ft)
- Coordinates: 37°3′38″S 146°25′6″E

Geography
- Location: Mount Bulla Bulla in Victoria, Australia
- Parent range: Victorian Alps, Great Dividing Range

Climbing
- First ascent: Unknown

Mount Bulla Bulla is a mountain in the Victorian Alps of the Great Dividing Range. It is located within the Alpine National Park, in the Australian state of Victoria. The name Bulla Bulla was the original indigenous name for Mt Buller.

The mountain has an elevation of 906 metres (2,972 ft) AMSL.

== See also ==
- Alpine National Park
- List of mountains in Australia § Victoria
- Snowy River National Park
