= Mount Kaye =

Mountain in Victoria, Australia

- Location within Victoria

Highest point
- Elevation: 998 metres (3,274 ft) (approx) AHD
- Coordinates: 37°23′40″S 149°14′50″E

Geography
- Location: Victoria, Australia

Mount Kaye is a mountain in the Coopracambra National Park, north of the township of Cann River in East Gippsland in Victoria, Australia.

== Geology ==
The Mount Kaye Range is an outcrop of black and white Noorinbee Granodiorite, exposed on slopes and peaks. Small streams draining the range descend 300 metres (980 ft) in a series of falls and cascades to the Cann River at the base.

== Flora ==
The area between Mount Kaye and Mount Denmarsh, together with the nearby Back Creek catchment, has high biological significance, containing a large number of rare plants including Long-leaf Bitter pea (Daviesia wyattiana), Tasmanian Waxflower (Philotheca virgata), Genoa Grevillea (Grevillea parvula), Finger Hakea (Hakea dactyloides), Rusty Velvet-bush (Lasiopetalum ferrugineum), New South Wales Pomaderris (Pomaderris ledifolia) and Monkey Mint-bush (Prostanthera walteri). The furthest extent of distribution for many sub-alpine species from Tasmania as well as eastern New South Wales species is reached at the Mount Kaye area. An area of 8,100 hectares (20,000 acres) around Mount Kaye is designated as a Remote and Natural Area under the National Parks Act (VIC).

== Access ==
The nearest sealed road to the mountain is the Monaro Highway which runs along the Cann River valley 4 kilometres (2.5 mi) to the west. There are four-wheel drive tracks near Mount Kaye, however these are overgrown with difficult stream crossings and are suitable for emergency access only. Walking to the peak requires navigational skills and is physically demanding.

== See also ==
- List of mountains in Australia § Victoria
