= The Gap Scenic Reserve =

Protected area in Victoria, Australia

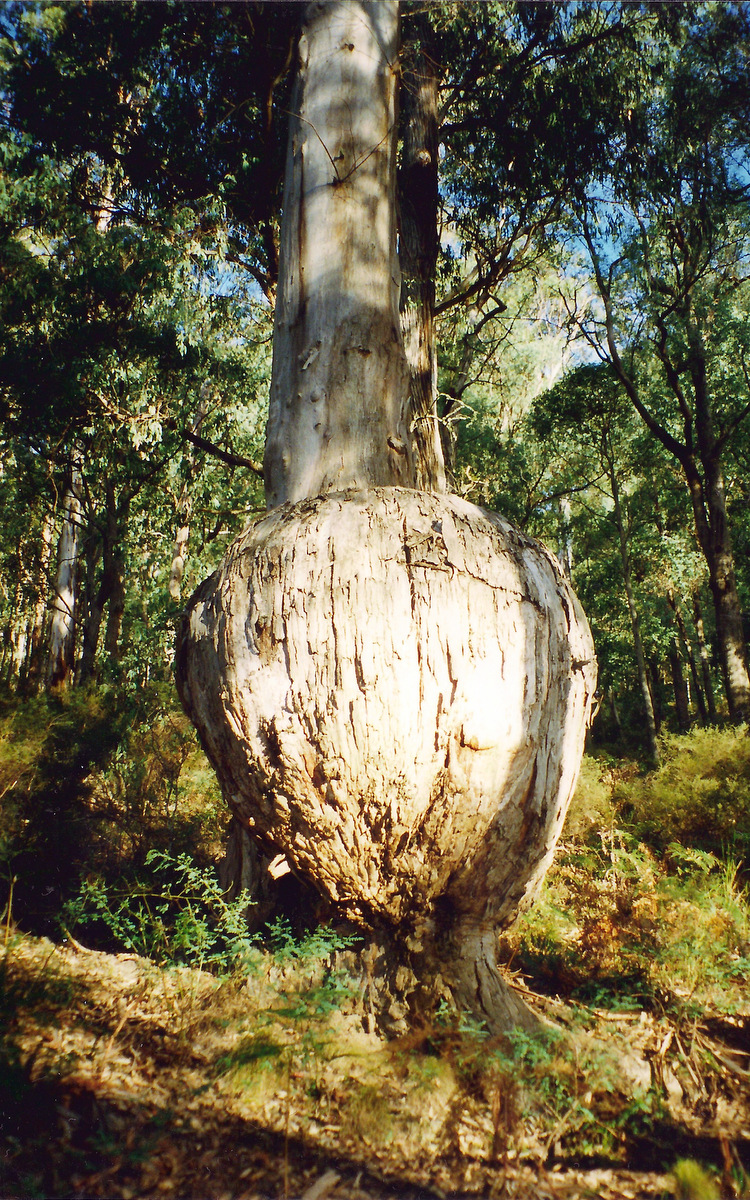
- the "Bottle Tree" with a gall, beside the Bonang Highway

- Location within Victoria
- Location: Victoria
- Nearest city: Cann River, Victoria
- Coordinates: 37°14.628′S 148°45.443′E

The Gap Scenic Reserve is situated in the state of Victoria in south eastern Australia. It is a small reserve in isolated forest country beside the Bonang Highway. The reserve features tall eucalyptus trees and ferny gullies. Significant tree species include mountain grey gum, messmate and the shining gum. Threatened fauna includes powerful owls, tiger quolls and long-footed potoroos.
