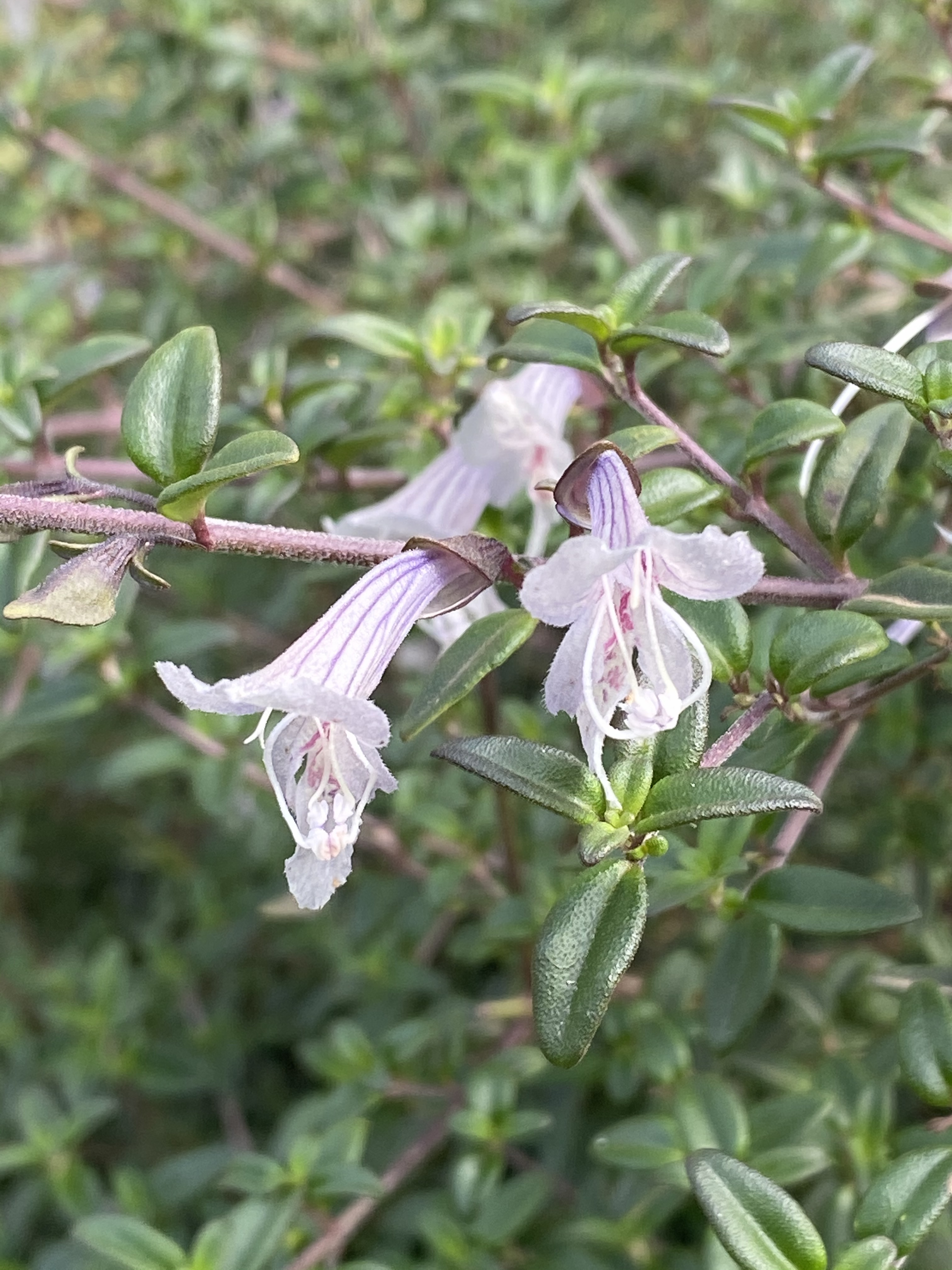

Scientific classification
- Kingdom: Plantae
- Clade: Tracheophytes
- Clade: Angiosperms
- Clade: Eudicots
- Clade: Asterids
- Order: Lamiales
- Family: Lamiaceae
- Genus: Prostanthera
- Species: P. walteri

Binomial name
- Prostanthera walteri F.Muell.
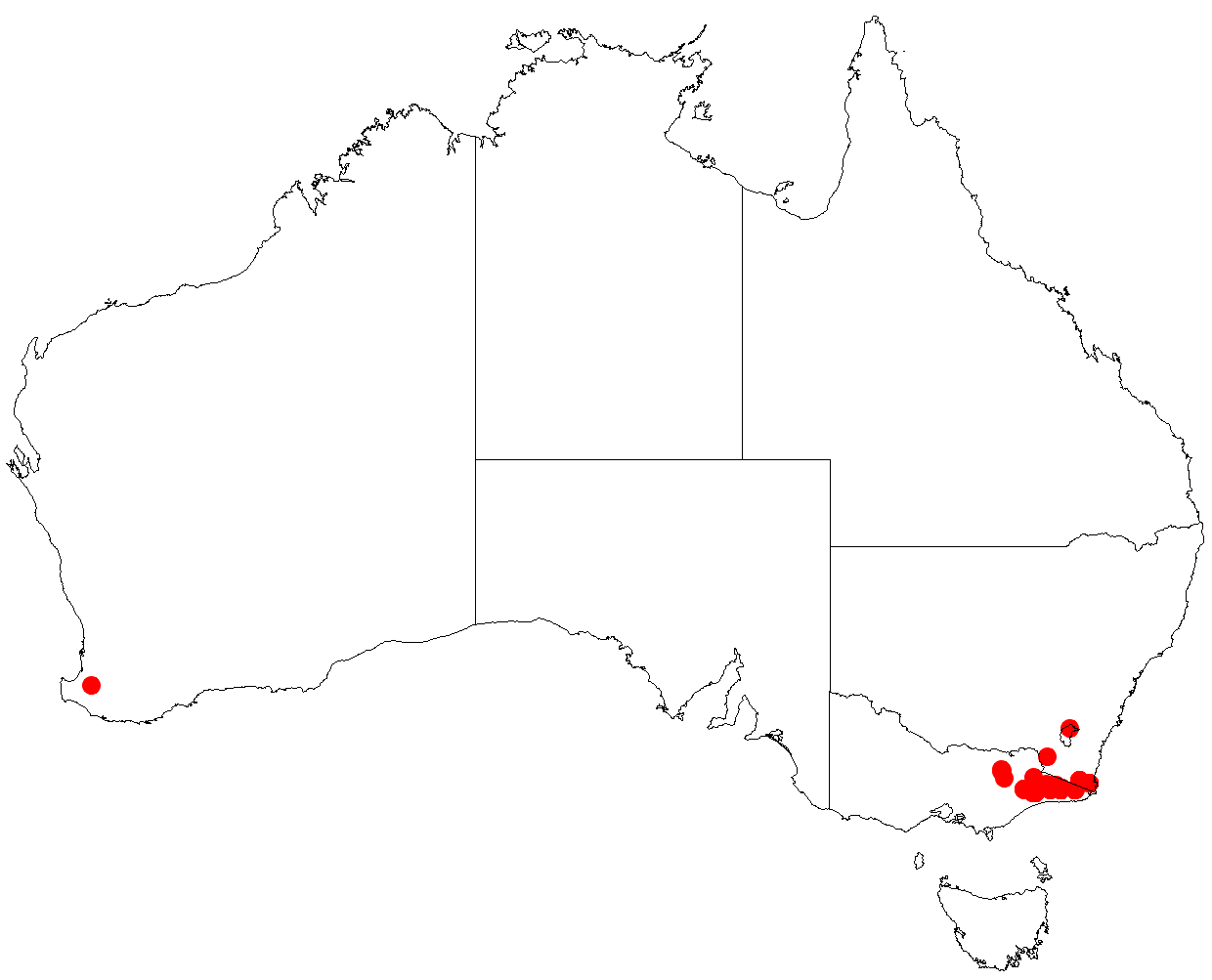
- Occurrence data from AVH

= Prostanthera walteri =

Blotchy mint-bush

Species of flowering plant

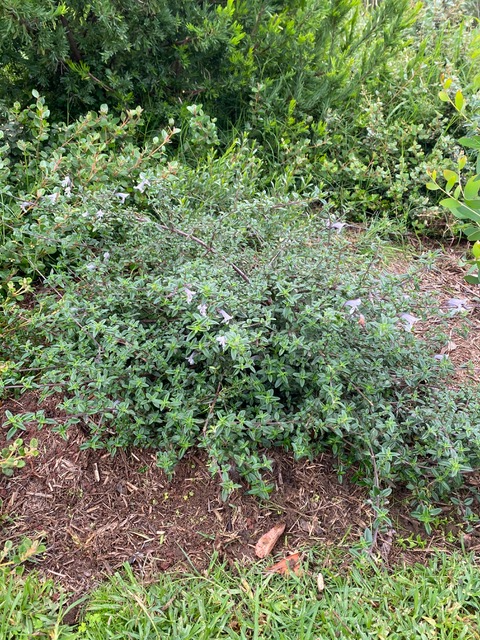
Habit

Prostanthera walteri, commonly known as blotchy mint-bush, is a species of flowering plant that is endemic to south-eastern Australia. It is a sprawling shrub with tangled, hairy branches, egg-shaped leaves and usually bluish green flowers with prominent purple veins arranged singly in leaf axils.

== Description ==
Prostanthera walteri is a sprawling shrub that typically grows to a height of 1–2 m (3 ft 3 in – 6 ft 7 in) and has hairy, glandular, often tangled, wiry branches. The leaves are egg-shaped, mostly 18–26 mm (0.71–1.02 in) long and 5–15 mm (0.20–0.59 in) wide on a petiole 2–5 mm (0.079–0.197 in) long. The lower surface of the leaves is hairy and the upper is grooved and more or less glabrous. The flowers are arranged singly in leaf axils on a hairy pedicel 3–6 mm (0.12–0.24 in) long with bracteoles 4–6.5 mm (0.16–0.26 in) long at the base of the sepals. The sepals are 10–12 mm (0.39–0.47 in) long, forming a tube 4–5 mm (0.16–0.20 in) long with two lobes 3–6 mm (0.12–0.24 in) long. The petals are 18–26 mm (0.71–1.02 in) long, forming a tube 12–16 mm (0.47–0.63 in) long and usually bluish green with prominent purple veins. The lower middle lobe of the tube is 5–10 mm (0.20–0.39 in) long and 3–9.5 mm (0.12–0.37 in) wide, the side lobes 5–7 mm (0.20–0.28 in) long and 1–1.5 mm (0.039–0.059 in) wide, the upper lobe is broadly egg-shaped, 5–10 mm (0.20–0.39 in) long and 6–10 mm (0.24–0.39 in) wide with a central notch about 0.5 mm (0.020 in) deep. Flowering occurs in summer.

== Taxonomy and naming ==
Prostanthera walteri was first formally described in 1870 by Victorian Government Botanist Ferdinand von Mueller in the seventh volume of Fragmenta Phytographiae Australiae, based on plant material collected by Carl Walter at Mount Ellery in East Gippsland. The specific epithet (walteri) honours the collector of the type specimens.

== Distribution and habitat ==
Blotchy mint-bush occurs on granitic soils in forests in New South Wales south from Mount Imlay to East Gippsland in north-eastern Victoria.
