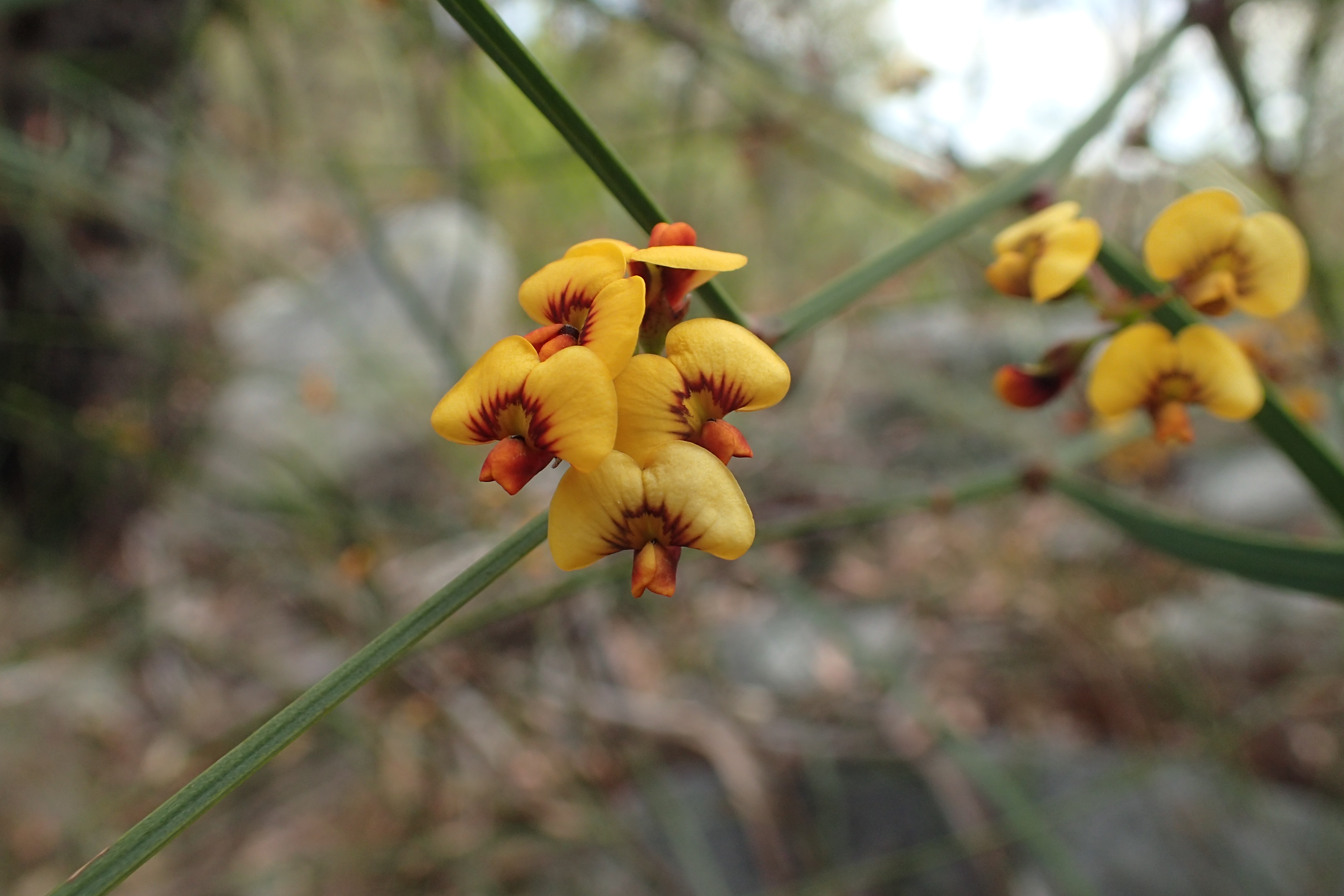

Scientific classification
- Kingdom: Plantae
- Clade: Tracheophytes
- Clade: Angiosperms
- Clade: Eudicots
- Clade: Rosids
- Order: Fabales
- Family: Fabaceae
- Subfamily: Faboideae
- Genus: Daviesia
- Species: D. wyattiana

Binomial name
- Daviesia wyattiana F.M.Bailey

= Daviesia wyattiana =

Long-leaf bitter-pea

Species of flowering plant

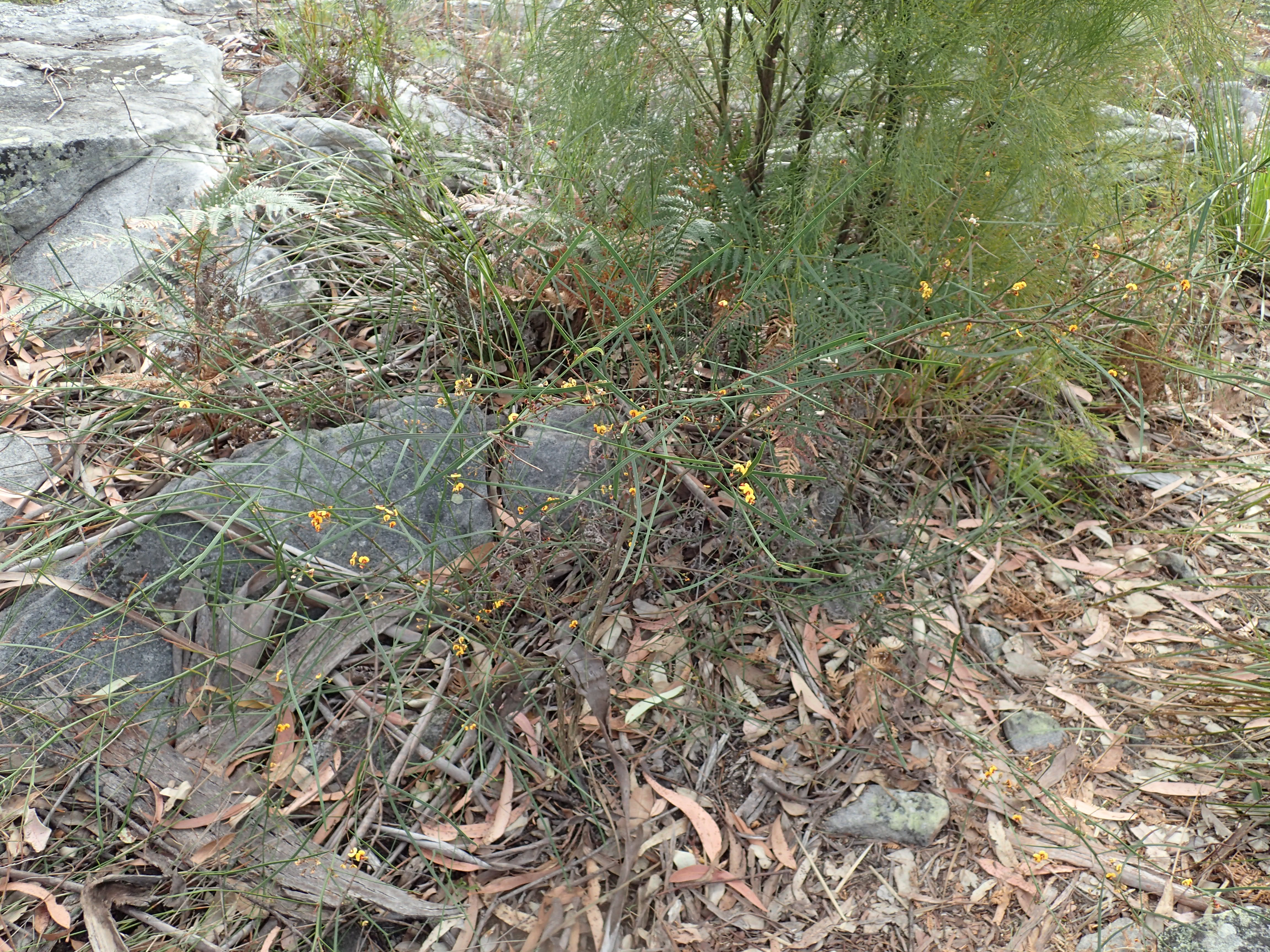
Habit in the Sherwood Nature Reserve near Glenreagh

Daviesia wyattiana, commonly known as long-leaf bitter-pea, is a species of flowering plant in the family Fabaceae and is endemic to eastern Australia. It is a sparse, erect shrub with long, linear phyllodes, and groups of four to seven yellow flowers with red or purplish markings.

== Description ==
Daviesia wyattiana is a sparse, erect shrub that typically grows to a height of 1–2.5 m (3 ft 3 in – 8 ft 2 in) and has glabrous foliage. The branchlets are triangular in cross-section and 1.5–3 mm (0.059–0.118 in) wide and the phyllodes are linear, 40–220 mm (1.6–8.7 in) long and 2–8 mm (0.079–0.315 in) wide with a prominent mid-vein. The flowers are arranged in groups of four to seven, the groups on a peduncle 7–28 mm (0.28–1.10 in) long, the individual flowers on pedicels 5–15 mm (0.20–0.59 in) long. The sepals are 3.5–4.5 mm (0.14–0.18 in) long and joined at the base with more or less equal lobes. The standard petal is broadly egg-shaped, about 7 mm (0.28 in) long and 8 mm (0.31 in) wide and yellow to orange with red or purplish markings, the wings yellow with a red base and 5–6.5 mm (0.20–0.26 in) long, and the keel is light red and 4.5–5.0 mm (0.18–0.20 in) long. Flowering occurs from August to November and the fruit is a triangular pod 7–10 mm (0.28–0.39 in) long.

== Taxonomy and naming ==
Daviesia wyattiana was first formally described in 1880 by Frederick Manson Bailey in the journal, The Garden and The Field: A Journal of General Industries, from a specimen he found "growing among rocks at the Eight-mile Plain, a locality to the south of Brisbane". The specific epithet (wyattiana) honours "Dr. Wm. Wyatt, a great promoter of Botany and Horticulture in South Australia".

== Distribution ==
Long-leaf bitter-pea usually grows in forest on rocky ridges and occurs from the central ranges of Queensland to near Coffs Harbour, then disjunctly from the Budawangs in southern New South Wales to the far east of Victoria.
