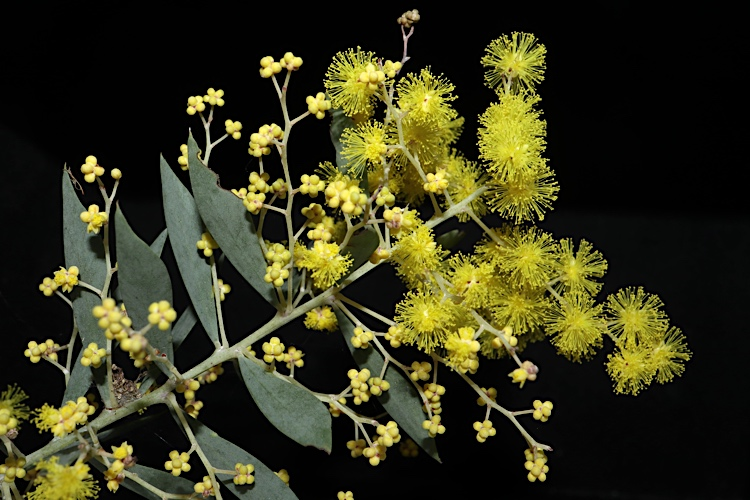

Scientific classification
- Kingdom: Plantae
- Clade: Embryophytes
- Clade: Tracheophytes
- Clade: Spermatophytes
- Clade: Angiosperms
- Clade: Eudicots
- Clade: Rosids
- Order: Fabales
- Family: Fabaceae
- Subfamily: Caesalpinioideae
- Clade: Mimosoid clade
- Genus: Acacia
- Species: A. boormanii

Binomial name
- Acacia boormanii Maiden

Synonyms
- List: Acacia boormani Maiden orth. var.; Acacia hunteriana N.A.Wakef.; Racosperma boormanii (Maiden) Pedley; Acacia linearis auct. non (J.C.Wendl.) Sims: Williamson, H.B. in Ewart, A.J. (1931)

= Acacia boormanii =

Snowy River wattle

Species of legume

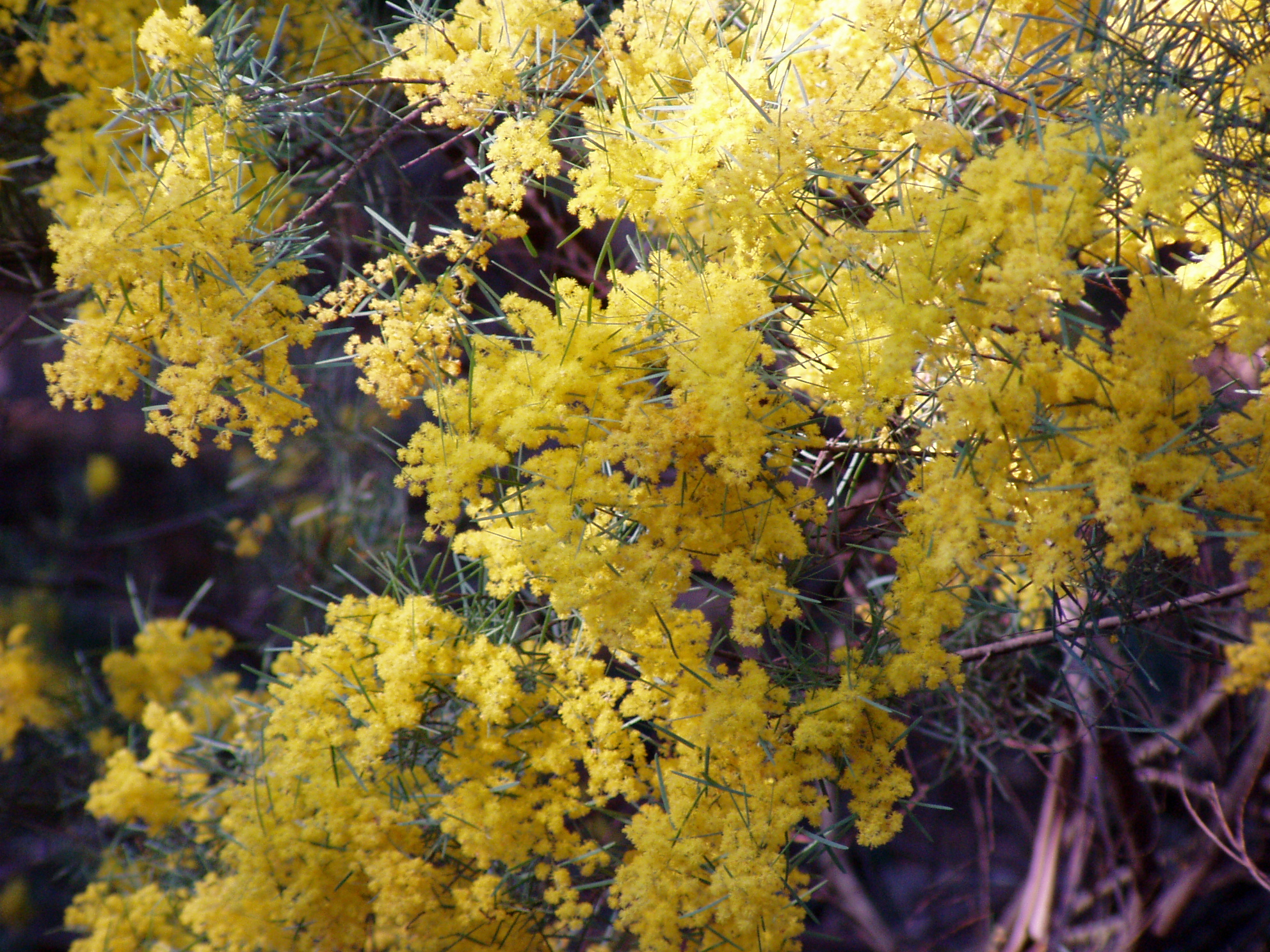
In the Australian National Botanic Gardens

Acacia boormanii, commonly called Snowy River wattle, is a species of flowering plant in the family Fabaceae and is endemic to south-east continental Australia. It is a bushy shrub with narrowly linear to narrowly lance-shaped, or oblong to narrowly elliptic phyllodes, golden-yellow flowers arranged in spherical heads on a raceme, and firmly papery, linear pods.

== Description ==
Acacia boormanii is a bushy shrub that typically grows to a height of 4 m (13 ft) and has glabrous branchlets, often with a white, powdery bloom on the ends. The phyllodes are flat, narrowly linear, narrowly lance-shaped with the narrower end towards the base, or oblong to narrowly elliptic, mostly 30–65 mm (1.2–2.6 in) long and 1–5 mm (0.039–0.197 in) wide with indistinct veins and a gland 2–16 mm (0.079–0.630 in) above the base. The flowers are borne in five to ten spherical heads on a raceme 10–40 mm (0.39–1.57 in) long on peduncles 2–4 mm (0.079–0.157 in) long. The heads are 5–8 mm (0.20–0.31 in) in diameter with five to ten golden-yellow, sweetly-scented flowers. Flowering time depends on subspecies, and the pods are firmly papery, glabrous, up to 90 mm (3.5 in) long and 4–6.5 mm (0.16–0.26 in) wide with oblong to elliptic, shiny black seeds 4.5–5 mm (0.18–0.20 in) long with a relatively large aril.

== Taxonomy ==
Acacia boormanii was first formally described in 1916 by Joseph Maiden in the Journal and Proceedings of the Royal Society of New South Wales from specimens collected by John Luke Boorman in 1913. The specific epithet (boormanii) honours the collector of the type specimens.

In 2018, Kelsey Tucker, Daniel Murphy and Neville Walsh described two subspecies of A. boormanii in the journal Muelleria and the names are accepted by the Australian Plant Census:

- Acacia boormanii Maiden subsp. boormanii commonly forms root suckers has narrowly linear phyllodes mostly 30–65 mm (1.2–2.6 in) long 1–2 mm (0.039–0.079 in) wide, not distinctly covered with a white bloom, and flowers from August to October.
- Acacia boormanii subsp. gibba K.J.Tucker is not root-suckering, has oblong to narrowly elliptic or narrowly lance-shaped phyllodes with the narrower end towards the base, mostly 2.5–5 mm (0.098–0.197 in) wide, distinctly covered with a white powdery bloom, and flowers in August and September.

== Distribution and habitat ==
Snowy River wattle grows in woodland and forest and occurs from the Cooma district in New South Wales to rocky slopes and banks of the Snowy River in Victoria. Subspecies gibba is restricted to Mount Typo and near the Rose River in Victoria, where it grows in montane to subalpine forest, mostly on shallow soils. It is also recorded as naturalised in the Australian Capital Territory and in some parts of Victoria.

== Use in horticulture ==
This wattle is very popular in cultivation.
