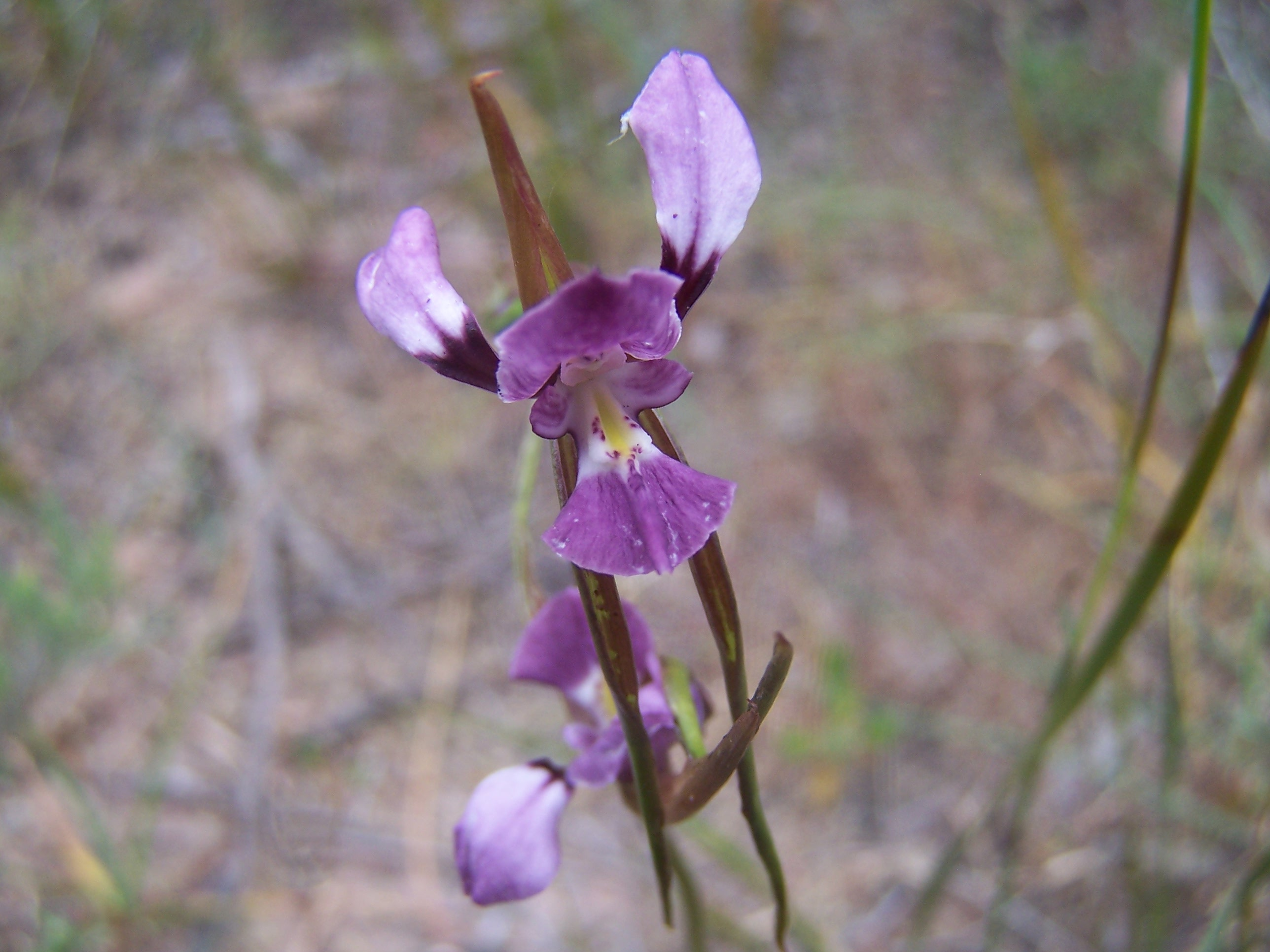

Scientific classification
- Kingdom: Plantae
- Clade: Embryophytes
- Clade: Tracheophytes
- Clade: Angiosperms
- Clade: Monocots
- Order: Asparagales
- Family: Orchidaceae
- Subfamily: Orchidoideae
- Tribe: Diurideae
- Genus: Diuris
- Species: D. punctata

Binomial name
- Diuris punctata Sm.

Synonyms
- Diuris blakneyae (F.M.Bailey) D.L.Jones; Diuris elongata Sw.; Diuris lilacina Lindl.; Diuris punctata f. blakneyae F.M.Bailey

= Diuris punctata =

Purple donkey orchid

Species of orchid

Diuris punctata, commonly known as purple donkey orchid is a species of orchid which is endemic to south-eastern continental Australia. It has two grass-like leaves and up to ten purple or mauve flowers, often with darker, sometimes yellow marks. A yellow form from near Guyra is probably now extinct.

== Description ==
Diuris punctata is a tuberous, perennial herb with two linear leaves 150–300 mm (6–10 in) long, 3–4 mm (0.1–0.2 in) wide and folded lengthwise. Up to ten flowers 50–60 mm (2.0–2.4 in) wide are borne on a flowering stem 300–600 mm (10–20 in) tall. The flowers are purple or mauve, often with darker, sometimes yellow marks. The dorsal sepal is more or less erect, elliptic to egg-shaped, 10–18 mm (0.4–0.7 in) long and 8–14 mm (0.3–0.6 in) wide. The lateral sepals are greenish-brown, linear to lance-shaped, 30–50 mm (1–2 in) long, 2–4 mm (0.08–0.2 in) wide and turned downwards. The petals are erect with an egg-shaped blade 7–17 mm (0.3–0.7 in) long and 7–15 mm (0.3–0.6 in) wide on a dark coloured stalk 2–6 mm (0.08–0.2 in) long. The labellum is 9–15 mm (0.4–0.6 in) long and has three lobes. The centre lobe is broadly egg-shaped to fan-shaped, 7–12 mm (0.3–0.5 in) long and 12–20 mm (0.5–0.8 in) wide and the side lobes are linear to wedge-shaped, 3–5 mm (0.1–0.2 in) long and 1.5–4 mm (0.06–0.2 in) wide. There are two ridge-like calli about 5 mm (0.2 in) long, surrounded by yellow in the mid-line of the labellum. Flowering occurs from September to December.

== Taxonomy and naming ==
Diuris punctata was first formally described in 1804 by James Edward Smith and the description was published in Exotic Botany. The specific epithet (punctata) is a Latin word meaning "spotted".

== Distribution and habitat ==
Purple donkey orchid is found in New South Wales, the Australian Capital Territory and Victoria growing in forest and grassland. In New South Wales it occurs south from the Moonbi Range and in Victoria north from the Mornington Peninsula. A form known as Diuris punctata var. sulfurea was known from a property near Guyra but is now thought to be extinct. It had smaller, yellow flowers.

== Conservation ==
Diuris punctata is classed as "threatened" in Victoria under the Flora and Fauna Guarantee Act 1988. The main threats to the species are competition from weeds and grasses, grazing and soil disturbance.
