= Little River (Snowy River National Park) =

River in Victoria, Australia

Little
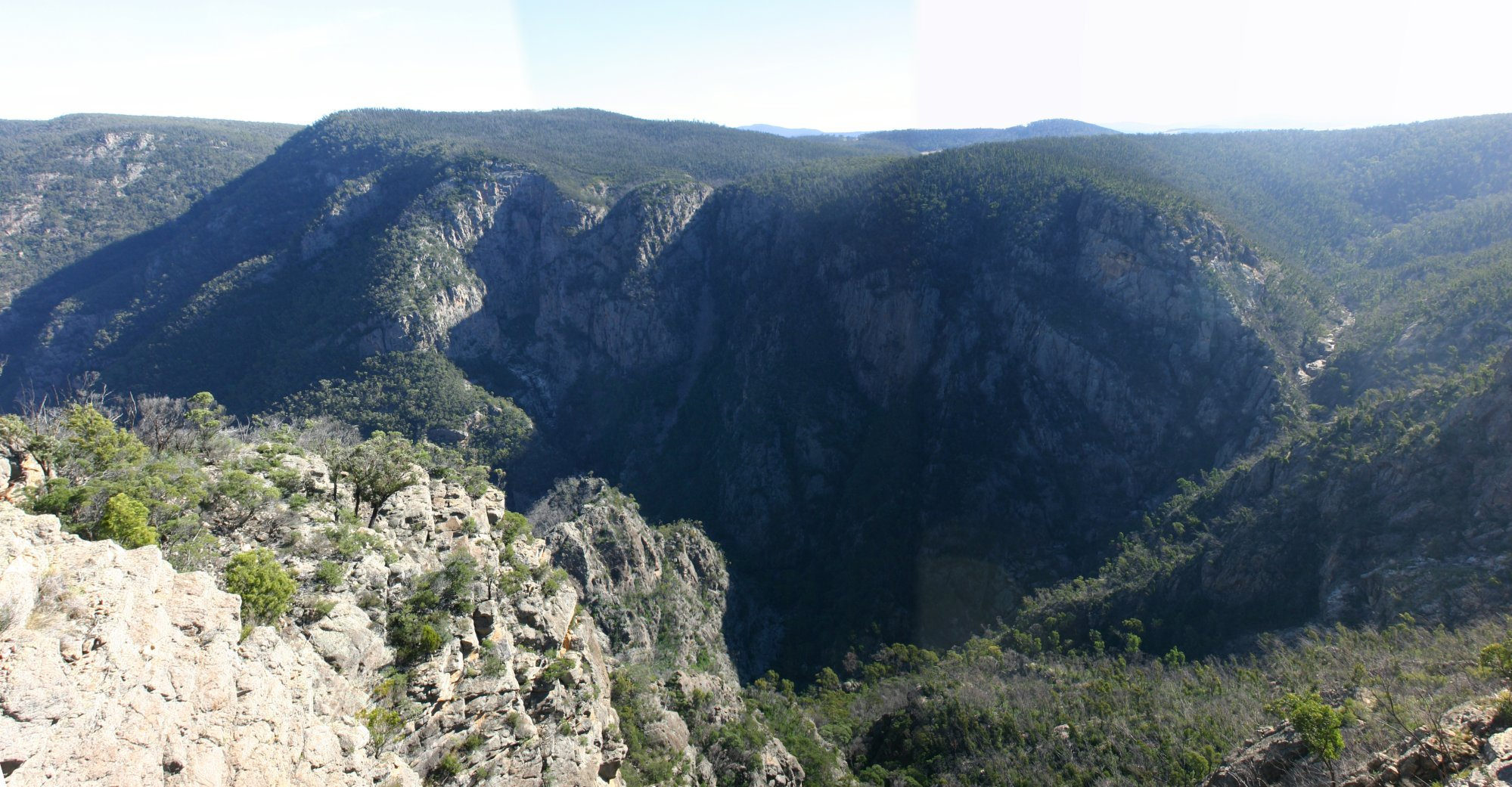
- Little River Gorge

- Mouth of the Little River in Victoria

Location
- Country: Australia
- State: Victoria
- Region: Australian Alps (IBRA), Victorian Alps, East Gippsland
- LGA: Shire of East Gippsland

Physical characteristics
- Source: Mount Strabroke
  - location: Snowy River National Park
  - elevation: 998 m (3,274 ft)
- Mouth: confluence with the Snowy River
  - location: west of Sugarloaf
  - coordinates: 37°7′21″S 148°22′20″E
  - elevation: 156 m (512 ft)
- Length: 27 km (17 mi)

Basin features
- River system: Snowy River catchment
- Tributaries
  - right: Wombargo Creek
- National park: Alpine NP, Snowy River

The Little River is a perennial river of the Snowy River catchment, in the Alpine region of the Australian state of Victoria. It is one of two rivers of the same name that are tributaries of the Snowy River, the other being the Little River (Kosciuszko National Park).

== Course and features ==
The Little River rises below Mount Stradbroke in a remote alpine wilderness area within the Alpine National Park, and flows generally southeast, the south and leaves the national park, before heading southeast, then south by southeast, re-entering the Alpine National Park and flowing through the Snowy River National Park; joined by one minor tributary, before reaching its confluence with the Snowy River west of the Sugarloaf in the Shire of East Gippsland. The river descends 842 metres (2,762 ft) over its 27-kilometre (17 mi) course.

At the locality of Wulgulmerang, the river is traversed by the Snowy River Road (C608) and McKillips Road (C611).

=== Little River Gorge ===
The Little River Gorge, located at 37°5′3″S 148°18′43″E, is the deepest gorge in the state of Victoria; and is located in the Snowy River National Park in East Gippsland.

A cliff-top lookout with views over the gorge is accessed by a walking track that is 400 metres (1,300 ft) long. A second lookout has views toward the gorge and Little River Falls.

== History ==
The traditional custodians of the land surrounding the Little River are the Australian Aboriginal Bidawal and Nindi-Ngudjam Ngarigu Monero peoples.

== See also ==
- List of rivers of Australia
- Mount Kosciuszko
