= Snowy River National Park =

National park in Victoria, Australia

- IUCN category II (national park)
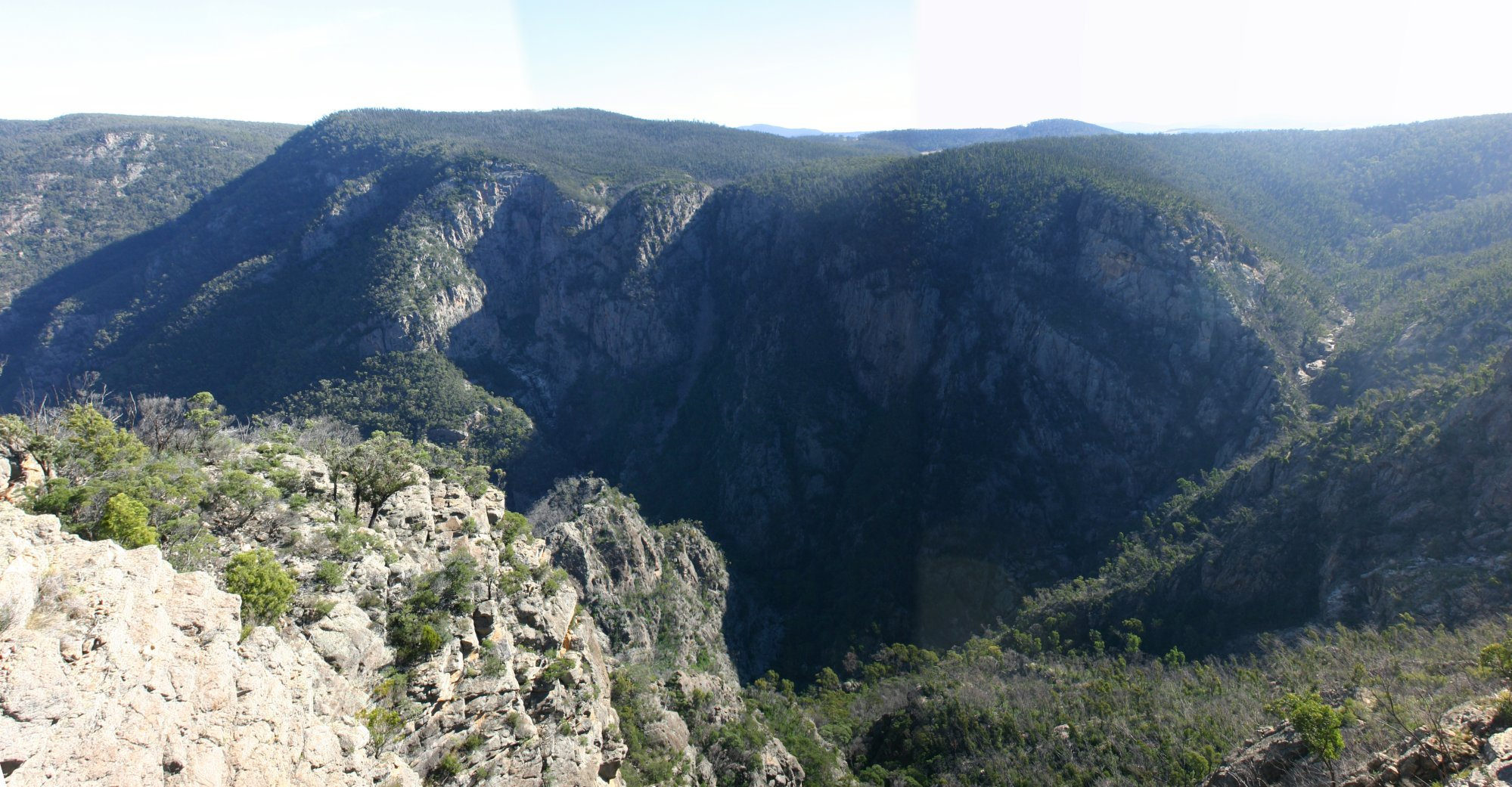
- The Little River Gorge, located within the national park

- Location within Victoria
- Location: Victoria
- Nearest city: Buchan
- Coordinates: 37°16′30″S 148°33′12″E
- Area: 987 km^{2} (381 sq mi)
- Established: 26 April 1979
- Governing body: Parks Victoria
- Website: Official website

The Snowy River National Park is a national park located in the Alpine and East Gippsland regions of Victoria, Australia. The 98,700-hectare (244,000-acre) national park is situated approximately 390 kilometres (240 mi) northeast of Melbourne and 350 kilometres (220 mi) southwest of Canberra, south of the Black-Allan Line that marks part of the border between Victoria and New South Wales.

On 7 November 2008, the park was added to the Australian National Heritage List as one of eleven areas constituting the Australian Alps National Parks and Reserves.

== History ==
Some Aboriginal relics were discovered on the Snowy River which indicated that the Kruatungulung group of the Kurnai people used to hunt here. It was in the 1840s that cattlemen and miners visited the region and started using the higher land for summer grazing and introduced silver mining. The proposal for the national park was submitted in 1935, but the establishment took place in 1979.

== Location and features ==
Declared on 26 April 1979, much of the park is classified as wilderness area, where vehicles are unable to visit. Within the national park is the Little River Gorge, Victoria's deepest gorge, with the Little River descending 610 metres (2,000 ft) off the Wulgulmerang plateau over 14 kilometres (8.7 mi) to the Snowy River at an elevation of 122 metres (400 ft) above sea level.

The park provides one of the last natural habitats at the Little River Gorge for the endangered brush-tailed rock wallaby. Numbers for this species are estimated as extremely small, with the rugged terrain making it difficult to accurately monitor the species population. Over 250 native species have been recorded in the park, 29 of which are considered rare or threatened in Victoria, including the long-footed potoroo, spotted quoll (tiger quoll), giant burrowing frog and Cyclodomorphus michaeli.

McKillops Road is the northern park boundary, with the Alpine National Park to the north of the road. The road is designated unsuitable for caravans, trailers and semi-trailers due to its long, narrow, and steep descent down to McKillops Bridge which crosses the Snowy River near its juncture with the Deddick River. The park is also located adjacent to the Errinundra National Park, the Coopracambra National Park, and the nearby Croajingolong National Park and Cape Conran Coastal Park.

== See also ==
- Protected areas of Victoria
- Snowy Mountains Scheme
- List of national parks of Australia
